= Tornadoes of 2025 =

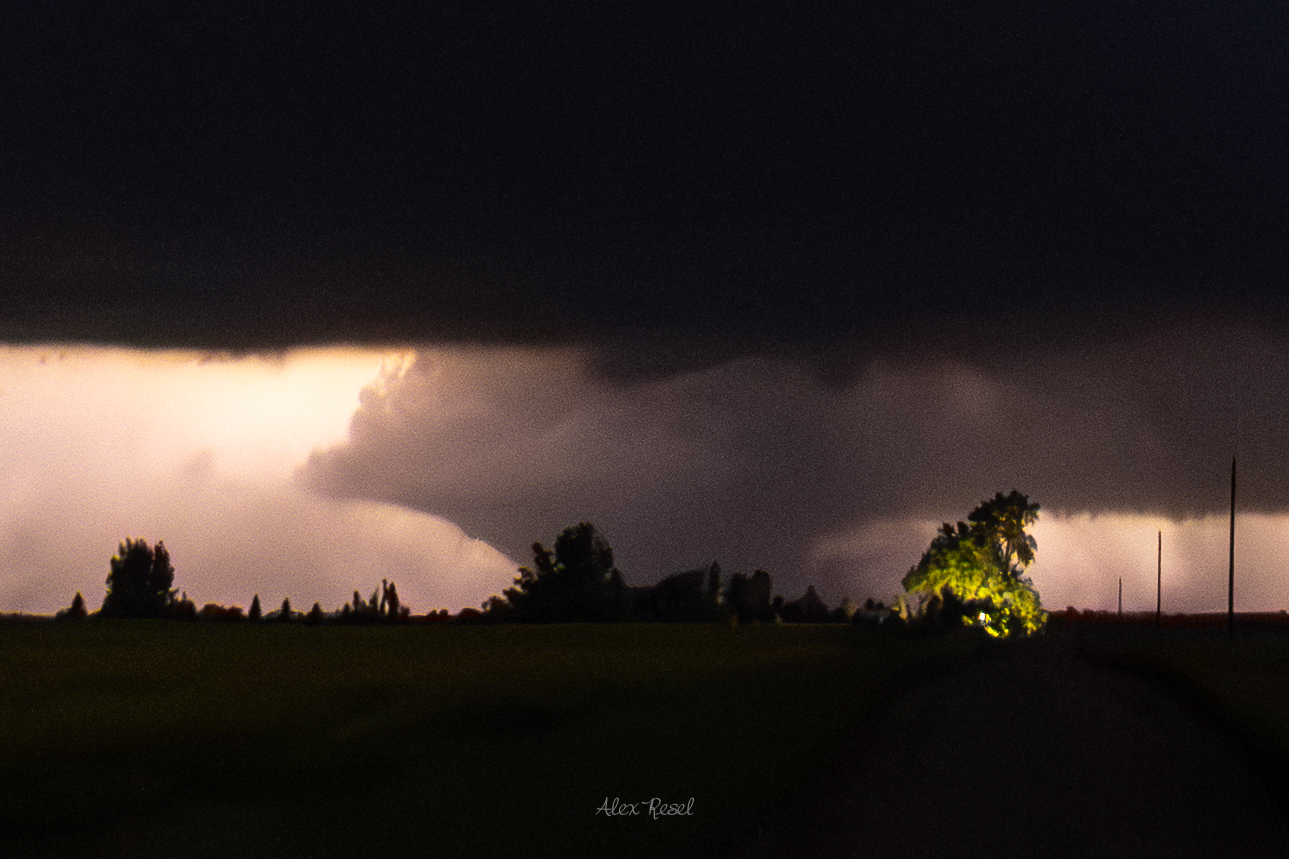
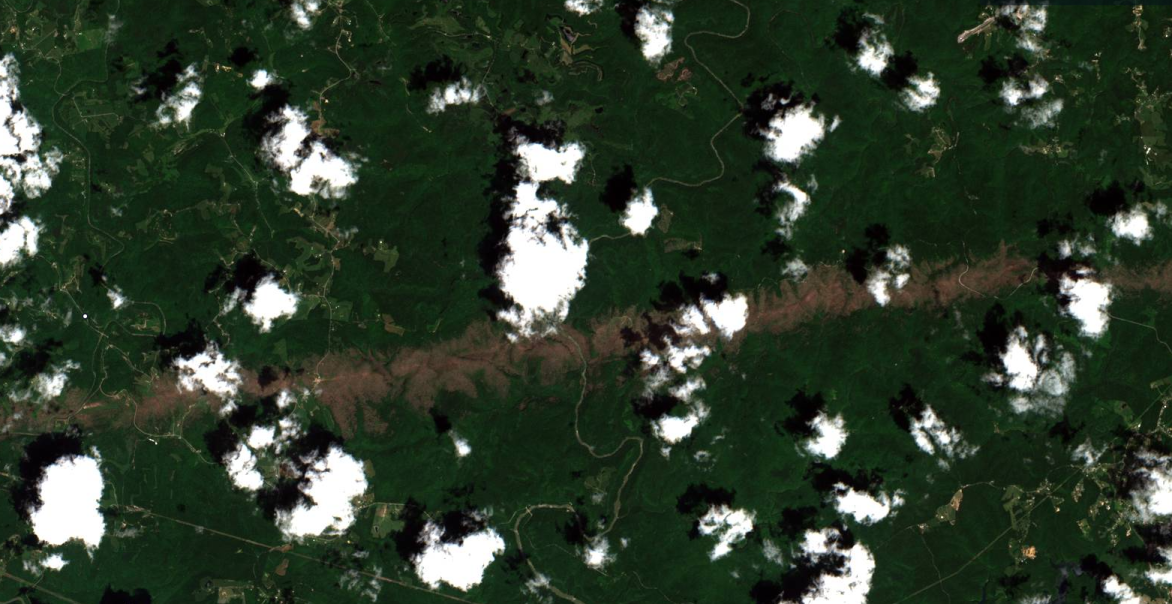
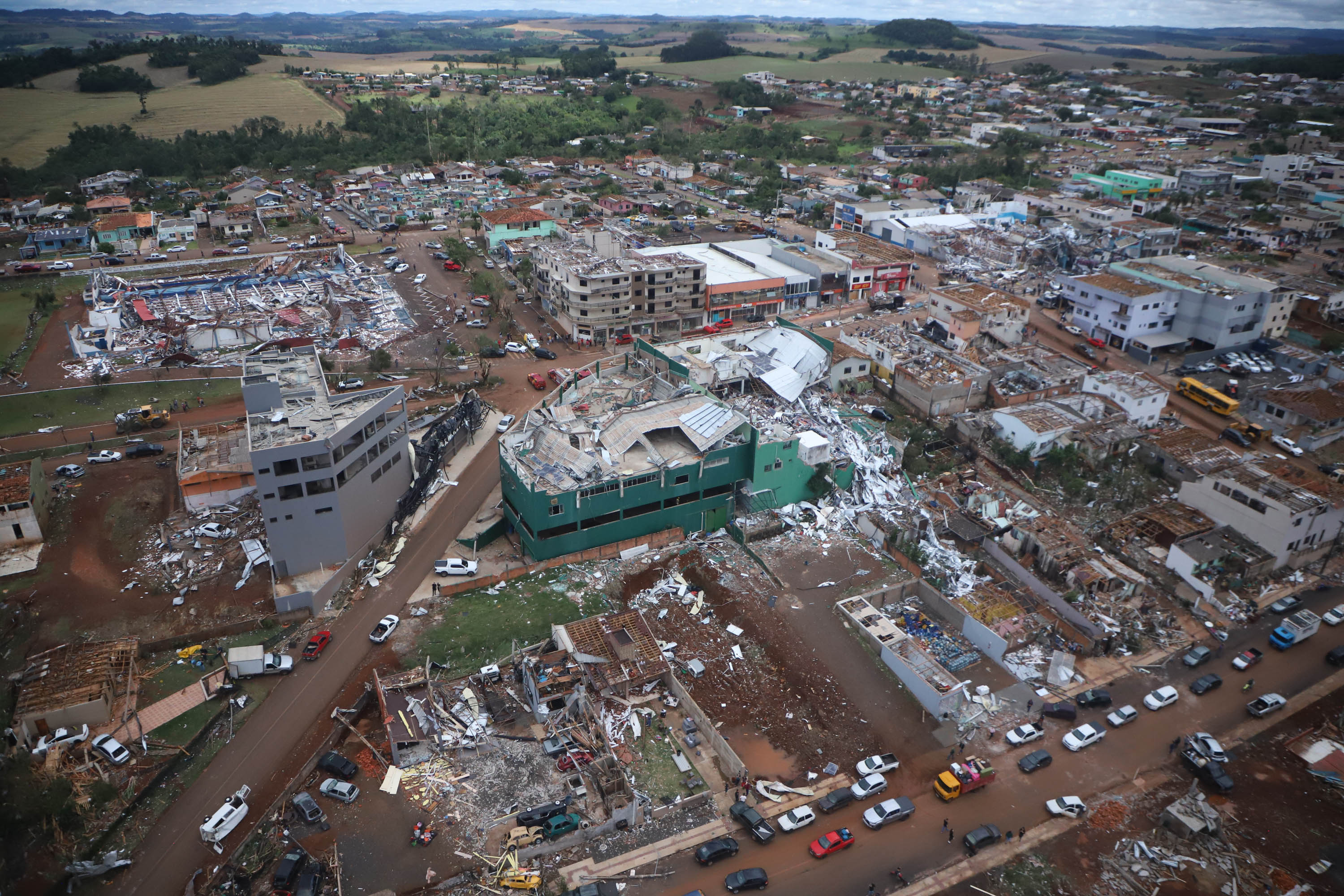
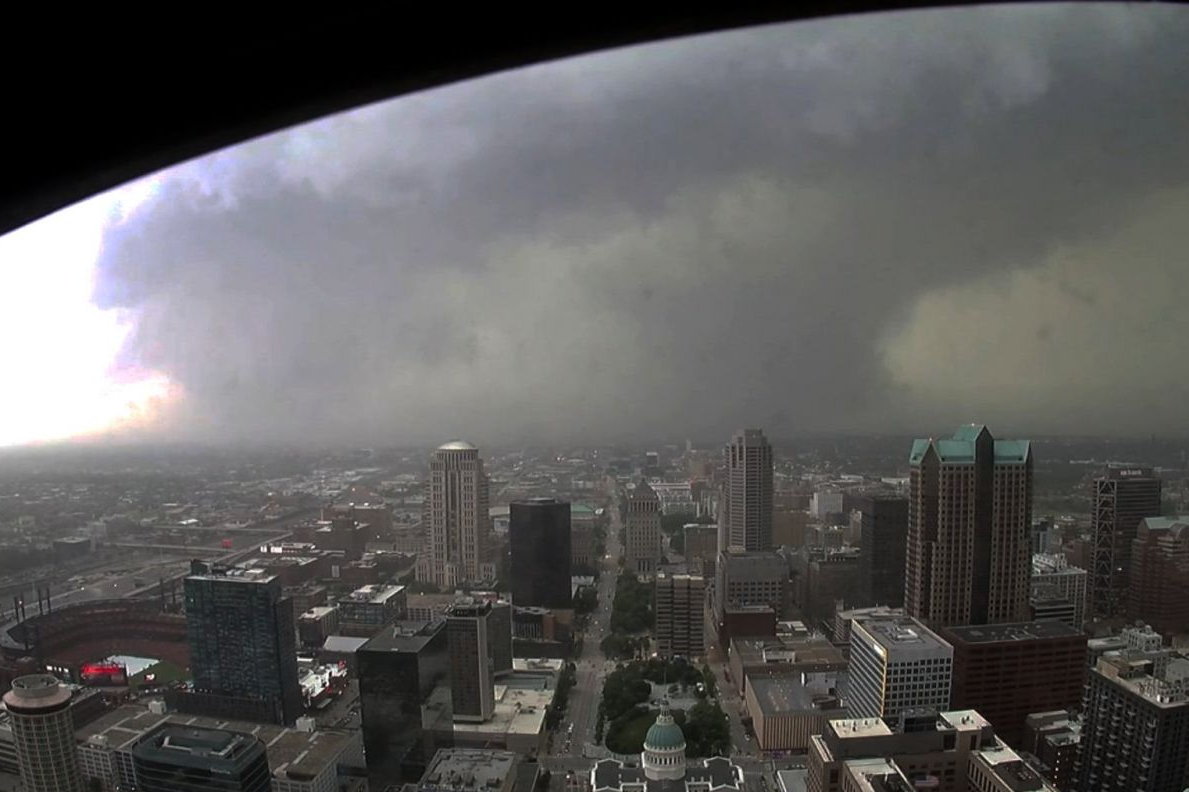
- Clockwise from top: An EF5 tornado near Enderlin, North Dakota on June 20, the first to be rated as such since 2013; A deeply pronounced damage scar in the Daniel Boone National Forest after a deadly EF4 tornado in southeastern Kentucky on May 16; A Storm Prediction Center mesoscale discussion regarding an EF4 tornado in southern Mississippi on March 15; a very large EF3 tornado as seen from the Gateway Arch in St. Louis, Missouri on May 16; Aerial view of damage in Rio Bonito do Iguaçu,Brazil after a direct impact from a large F4 tornado (Note: The F4 rating uses the original Fujita scale, which is distinct from the Enhanced Fujita scale used in the United States.) on November 7; Radar loop of a cyclic supercell near Greensburg, Kansas that produced a family of large tornadoes on May 18.
- Timespan: January 2 – December 31
- Maximum rated tornado: EF5 tornado: Enderlin, North Dakota on June 20
- Tornadoes in U.S.: 1,430
- Damage (U.S.): >$1.908 billion (Note: The official tornadic damage estimate from the National Oceanic and Atmospheric Administration. Several tornadoes are not included in this estimate.)
- Fatalities (U.S.): 67
- Fatalities (worldwide): 104

- Map of damage survey tracks of United States tornadoes in 2025. (Note: Damage Assessment Toolkit data is considered preliminary and may exclude or inaccurately reflect certain events.) (Interactive map, click or tap to view in detail) Key EF0 65–85 mph (105–137 km/h); EF1 86–110 mph (138–177 km/h); EF2 111–135 mph (179–217 km/h); EF3 136–165 mph (219–266 km/h); EF4 166–200 mph (267–322 km/h); EF5 ≥201 mph (323 km/h); EFU Unknown wind speed

This page documents notable tornadoes and tornado outbreaks worldwide in 2025. Strong and destructive tornadoes form most frequently in the United States, China, the Pampas, the European Plain, South Africa, and Bengal, but they can occur almost anywhere under the right conditions. Tornadoes also develop occasionally in southern Canada during the Northern Hemisphere's summer and somewhat regularly at other times of the year across Europe, Asia, and Australia. Tornadic events are often accompanied by other forms of severe weather, including strong thunderstorms, winds, and hail. Worldwide, at least 104 tornado-related deaths have been confirmed: 67 in the United States, 12 in Vietnam, seven in Brazil, four each in China, Spain, and Uganda, two in the Philippines, and one each in France, Japan, Portugal, and Turkey.

In the United States, the first two months of the year started off slightly below average, with generally scattered tornado activity.

However, a major increase in activity began in March as the synoptic pattern became much more favorable for tornado outbreaks, including the largest tornado outbreak on record for the month, which occurred mid-month. Significant and damaging outbreaks continued in the months of April and May, while June featured the first EF5 tornado in the United States since the 2013 Moore tornado, which occurred near Enderlin, North Dakota on June 20.

In contrast to 2024, however, 2025 had a significantly inactive late season, with 172 tornadoes occurring from August through December, compared to 1,106 from March to June. This was due to multiple Arctic blasts bringing very cold, unsuitable air, and the fact that no hurricanes made landfall in the United States during the hurricane season. 2025 also had the highest number of violent tornadoes in a year since 2013, with eight tornadoes worldwide receiving a rating of (E)F4 or higher. Six of these tornadoes occurred in the United States, and two in Brazil.

== Events ==
=== United States ===
Confirmed tornadoes by Enhanced Fujita rating
EFU	EF0	EF1	EF2	EF3	EF4	EF5	Total
271	414	563	141	35	5	1	1,430

Fatal United States tornadoes in 2025
- Approximate touchdown location of deadly tornadoes in 2025 Summary of tornadoes: February 6 – Tennessee (2 deaths); March 14 – Arkansas, Missouri (3 deaths); March 14 – Arkansas (3 deaths); March 14 – Missouri (3 deaths); March 14 – Missouri (2 deaths); March 14 – Missouri (1 death); March 14 – Missouri (1 death); March 15 – Louisiana, Mississippi (6 deaths); March 15 – Mississippi (1 death); March 15 – Mississippi (1 death); March 15 – Alabama (1 death); March 15 – Alabama (2 deaths); April 3 – Tennessee (5 deaths); April 3 – Mississippi, Tennessee (2 deaths); April 6 – Mississippi (1 death); April 19 – Oklahoma (1 death); May 16 – Missouri, Illinois (4 deaths); May 16 – Missouri (2 deaths); May 16 – Indiana (1 death); May 16 – Kentucky (19 deaths); May 30 – Kentucky (1 death); June 20 – North Dakota (3 deaths); June 22 – New York (3 deaths); Total fatalities: 67

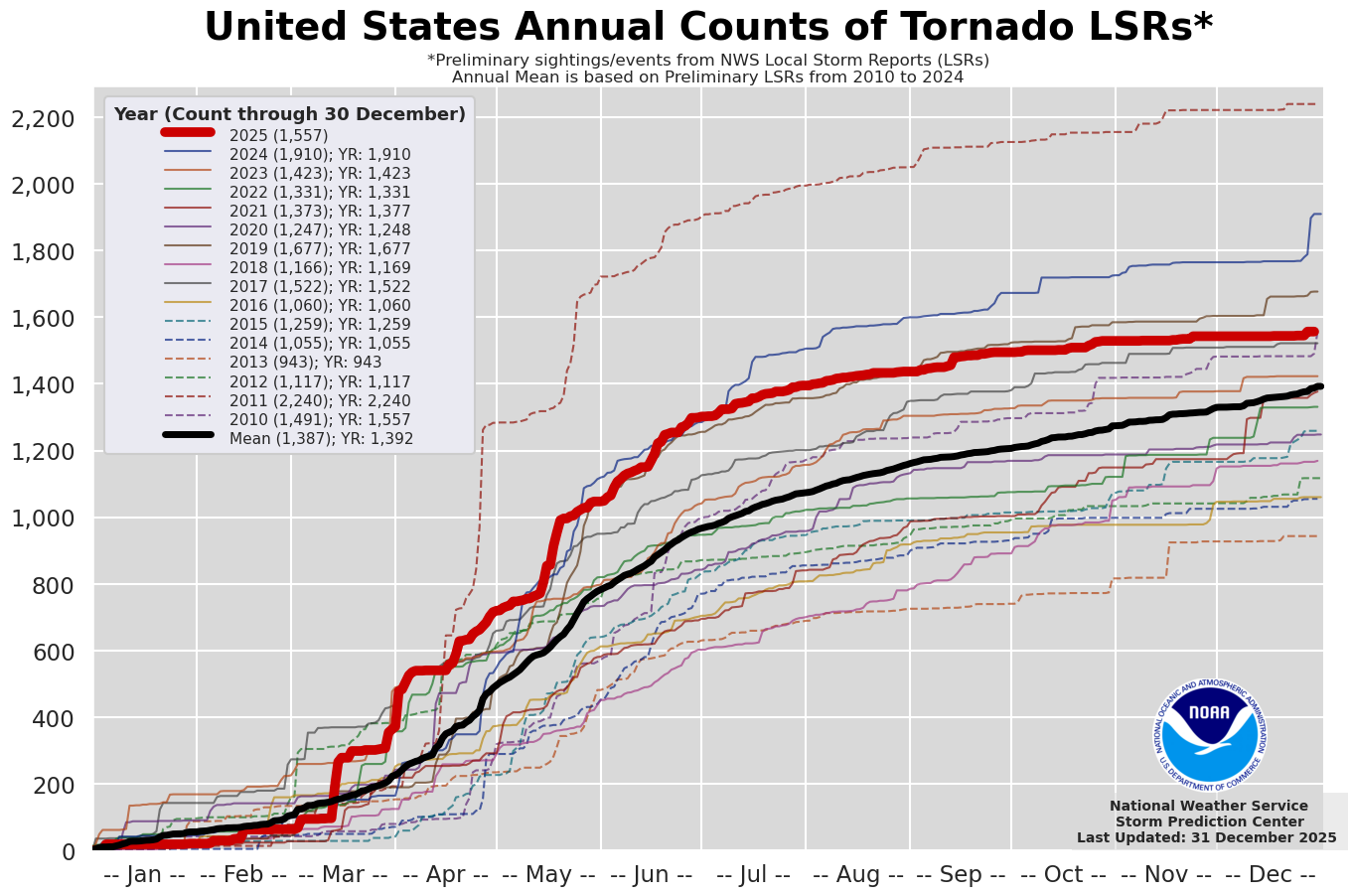
A chart of the 2025 United States tornado local storm reports through December 30, compared to years 2010–2024 and the mean of those years

=== Canada ===
Confirmed tornadoes by Enhanced Fujita rating
EFU	EF0	EF1	EF2	EF3	EF4	EF5	Total
22 (Note: The NTP rating for a tornado that does no known damage is EF0-default, which is equivalent to EFU on the American EF Scale.)	15	36	19	0	0	0	92

=== Europe ===
IFU	IF0	IF0.5	IF1	IF1.5	IF2	IF2.5	IF3	IF4	IF5	Total
117	22	61	84	64	31	0	0	0	0	387

- Note: Some tornadoes have been rated using different scales. They are counted as their closest IF-Scale equivalent on this table.
- Note: 8 tornadoes have been confirmed but have not been rated yet

=== South America ===
Confirmed tornadoes by Fujita rating
FU	F0	F1	F2	F3	F4	F5	Total
6	4	14	5	0	2	0	92

- Note: 17 tornadoes have been confirmed but not yet rated.
- Note: Some tornadoes have been rated using different scales. They are counted as their closest F-Scale equivalent on this table.

== January ==
=== January 3–7 (United States) ===
EFU	EF0	EF1	EF2	EF3	EF4	EF5
1	2	9	2	0	0	0

The Tehama County, California EFU tornado on January 3, 2025

From January 3 to January 7, a major winter storm passed over the contiguous United States. The storm system reached the West Coast of the United States, where it produced the first tornado of the year, a brief EFU tornado in rural Tehama County, California, which caused no damage. On January 4, a low pressure system organized over the Texas Panhandle and Oklahoma. Interacting with the existing cold air, the system’s warm front was predicted to generate severe thunderstorms across Southern United States on January 5, prompting the Storm Prediction Center to issue an enhanced risk for the region. The outlook included a 10% risk area for tornadoes, along with the potential for large hail and damaging winds.

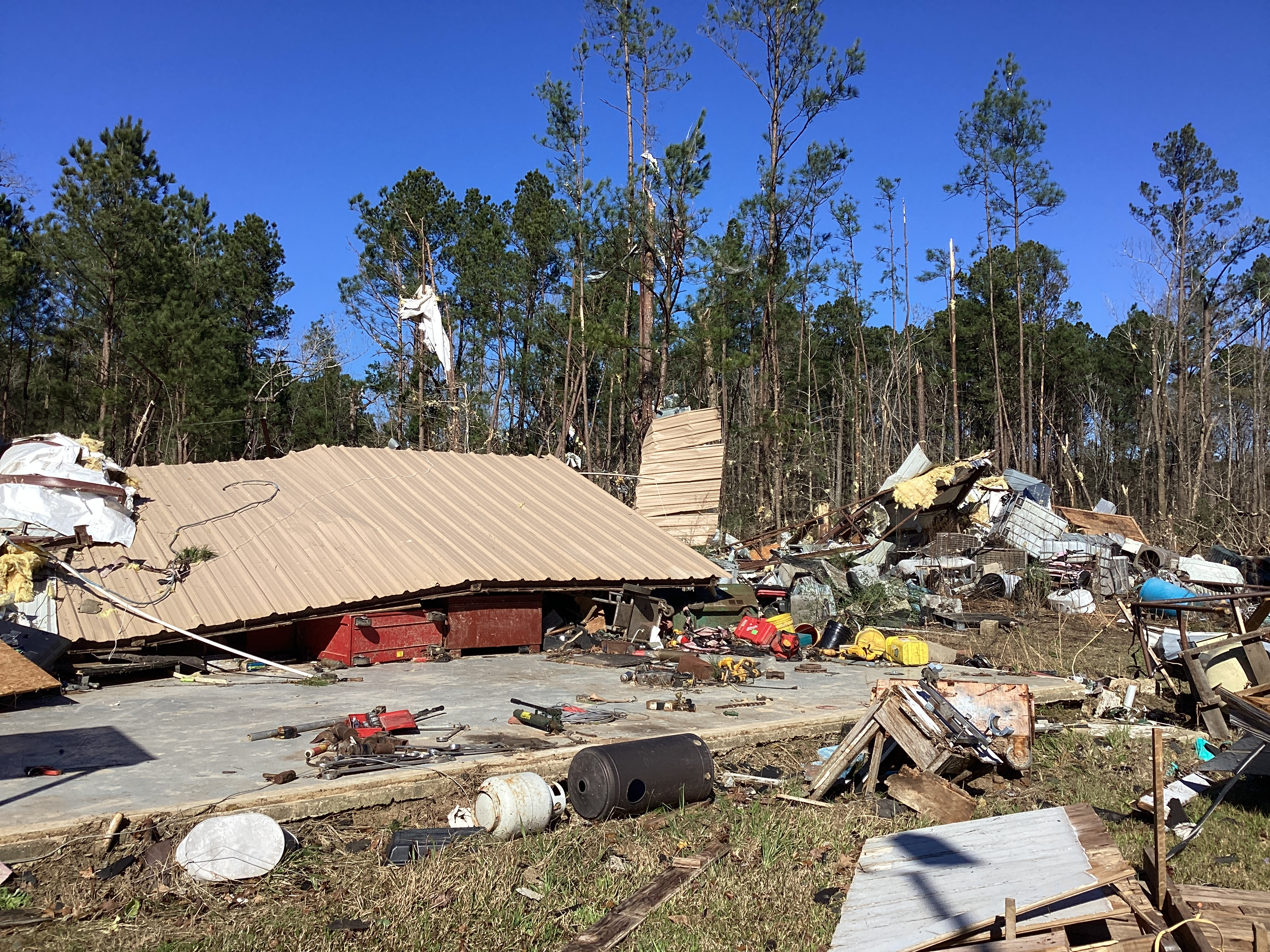
High-end EF2 damage to a well-constructed shop building east of Marion, Louisiana

On January 5, a small tornado outbreak occurred as a squall line of severe thunderstorms passed through the region, producing multiple tornadoes in Louisiana, Arkansas, Mississippi, and Alabama, including two strong tornadoes. A high-end EF2 tornado touched down near Marion, Louisiana. It completely destroyed a mobile home and a well-built shop building, damaged the roofs of multiple houses, and snapped numerous large trees. In Mississippi, a low-end EF2 tornado snapped or uprooted numerous trees and downed power poles as it passed to the north of Brooksville. High-end EF1 tornadoes caused moderate tree and structure damage in the rural Mississippi communities of Boon and Gwinville. A PDS tornado warning was issued for an EF1 tornado near Pelahatchie, damaged chicken houses, downed trees and power lines, and caused an indirect injury when a train ran into a downed tree that had fallen onto railroad tracks. A total of 14 tornadoes were confirmed, resulting in one indirect injury and no fatalities.

=== January 6 (Saudi Arabia) ===
As a red alert for severe weather was issued by the National Centre of Meteorology over the region around Mecca on January 6, a tornado was reported to have struck Rabigh, which was reported by Gulf News to be the strongest ever recorded in the coastal region of Saudi Arabia. The National Centre of Meteorology also discussed plans to further research the tornado.

=== January 17 (Italy) ===
IFU	IF0	IF0.5	IF1	IF1.5	IF2	IF2.5	IF3	IF4	IF5
0	0	1	1	1	2	0	0	0	0

Storm Gabri struck Italy on January 17, causing torrential rainfall, thunderstorms, strong winds, and multiple tornadoes, all of which occurred on the island of Sicily. An IF2 tornado impacted areas near Catania, causing significant roof and tree damage, bending a metal truss electrical transmission tower in half, and rolling a roulotte trailer 30 m (33 yd). Metal light poles were also bent, a semi-trailer was overturned, and sheet metal from buildings was scattered 500 m (550 yd) up a hillside. An IF1.5 tornado struck the northern suburbs of Catania and blew a camper over, downed several trees and damaged the roofs of multiple buildings. A strong, long-tracked multiple-vortex IF2 tornado that struck areas outside of Avola downed numerous trees and power lines, toppled another electrical transmission tower, destroyed a masonry outbuilding, unroofed a house, and damaged the roofs of other homes. In Augusta, an IF0.5 tornado overturned a small ape car, damaged concrete monuments and decorations at a cemetery, downed trees and power lines, and tore sheet metal roofing from buildings. An IF1 tornado struck the outskirts of Licata as well, damaging crops and destroying greenhouses. A total of five tornadoes were confirmed.

=== January 21 (Portugal) ===
Storm Garoé made landfall in Spain and Portugal on January 21, bringing strong winds, torrential rain, and severe weather in coastal areas. During the late evening, an IF2 tornado tracked through rural areas near the community of Montevil in Setúbal District, Portugal. Many large trees were snapped or uprooted along the path, and some were defoliated and stripped of their branches. Some crop damage also occurred, and power lines were downed.

=== January 23 (United Kingdom) ===
On January 23, Storm Éowyn made landfall in United Kingdom, resulting in strong winds and heavy rain. An IF2 tornado moved through Holywell and Quintrell Downs, causing severe damage at the Trevornick Caravan Park, snapping many trees, and causing roof damage to homes. Multiple mobile homes and RVs were tossed and destroyed at the caravan park, resulting in one injury.

=== January 26 (New Zealand) ===
A low-pressure system organized to the west of New Zealand, causing heavy rain and severe thunderstorms on the North Island. In the early morning of January 26, a damaging tornado hit Mangawhai and surrounding areas in the Northland Region, downing many trees, snapping concrete power poles, and ripping roofs off of homes. A media business sustained extensive structural damage, cars were damaged, debris was left deposited in trees, and two people were seriously injured. There was damage to about 50 properties, and about 4,700 homes lost power. The tornado was not officially rated, but was estimated to have reached high-end EF1 or low-end EF2 intensity.

=== January 27 (Europe) ===
IFU	IF0	IF0.5	IF1	IF1.5	IF2	IF2.5	IF3	IF4	IF5
0	0	0	2	1	1	0	0	0	0

On January 27, a damaging IF2 tornado struck Torre de Juan Abad, Spain. The strong tornado tracked through the northern part of town, causing significant damage to cars, homes, restaurants, auto repair shops, and warehouses. Several brick and masonry buildings suffered major structural damage, including total roof loss and collapse of multiple exterior walls. The tornado also severely damaged farms in agricultural areas, and snapped or uprooted more than 1,000 olive trees. In England, an IF1 tornado downed trees and destroyed some sheds near Whitchurch Hill and an IF1.5 tornado damaged multiple homes and trees in and around Henley-on-Thames. An IF1 tornado also occurred in the outskirts of Rennes in France.

== February ==
=== February 5–6 (United States) ===
EFU	EF0	EF1	EF2	EF3	EF4	EF5
0	0	6	2	0	0	0

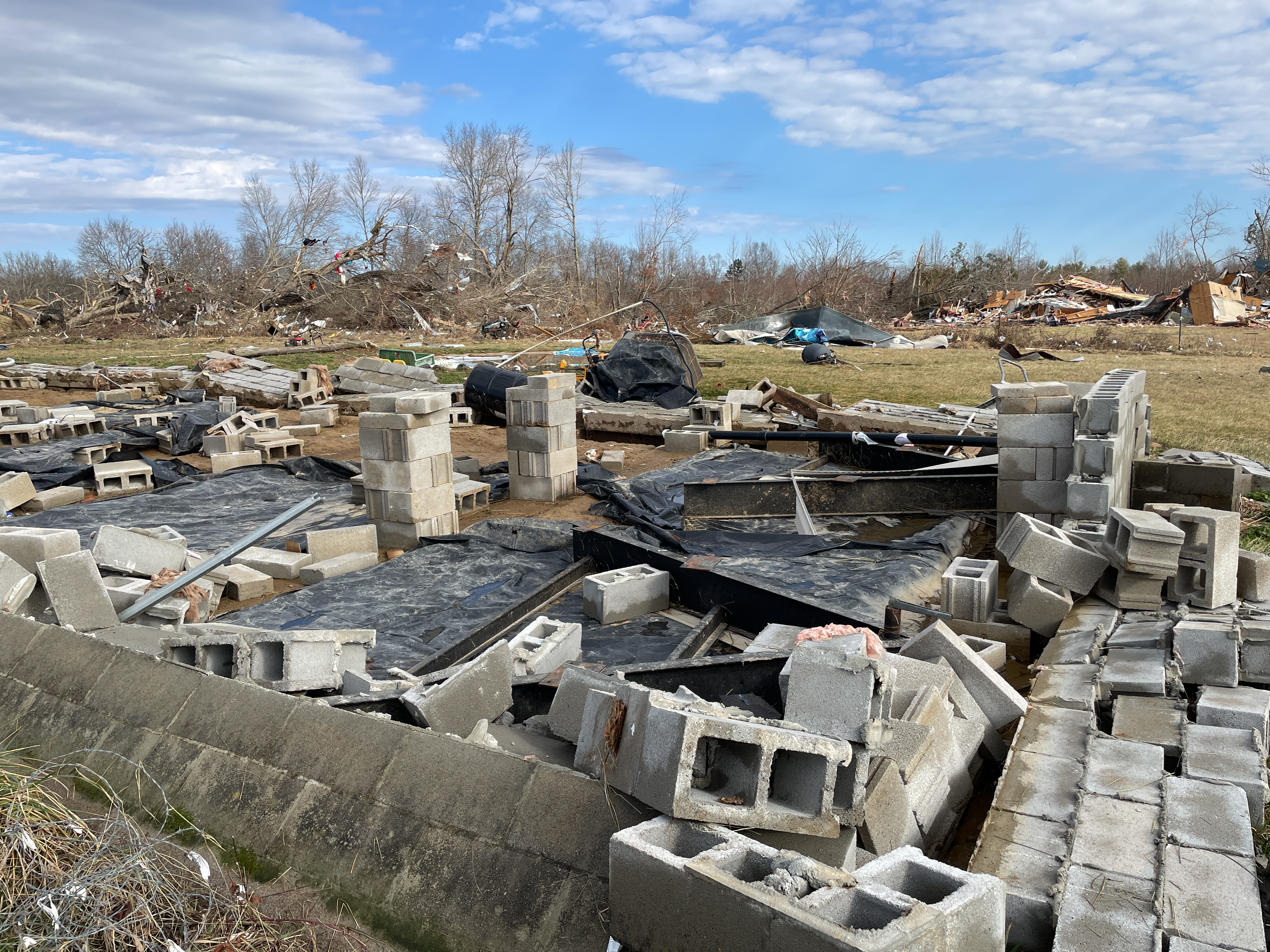
A mobile home that was destroyed at high-end EF2 intensity near Deer Lodge, Tennessee, resulting in two fatalities

On February 5, a winter storm hit the Ohio Valley, creating the potential for severe weather and a few tornadoes on the warm side of the system in Kentucky and Tennessee. A line of severe thunderstorms impacted the region later that night and continued into the early morning hours of February 6. The storms produced several tornadoes, including two strong tornadoes. Three tornadoes occurred in Kentucky, including an EF1 tornado near Island City in Owsley County. The tornado snapped or uprooted trees, destroyed a small shed-like residence, damaged two mobile homes, and was only the third tornado to be confirmed in the county since reliable records began in 1950. Two other EF1 tornadoes passed near Magnolia and Dango, downing trees, inflicting minor to moderate damage to homes, and damaging or destroying multiple barns and outbuildings. In Tennessee, a high-end EF2 tornado snapped or uprooted countless trees in wooded areas and completely destroyed two mobile homes near the community of Deer Lodge, killing two people inside one of the mobile homes and injuring two others. Another EF2 tornado touched down near Center Grove, causing major tree damage and destroying multiple barns. Two EF1 tornadoes touched down near Algood and Crawford, downed many trees, inflicted minor to moderate damage to various structures, and each injured one person. The final tornado of the event caused high-end EF1 damage near Thorn Hill, destroying a barn, overturning a tanker trailer, and inflicting window and siding damage to a church. A total of eight tornadoes were confirmed, resulting in two fatalities and four injuries.

=== February 12 (United States) ===
EFU	EF0	EF1	EF2	EF3	EF4	EF5
0	2	0	1	1	0	0

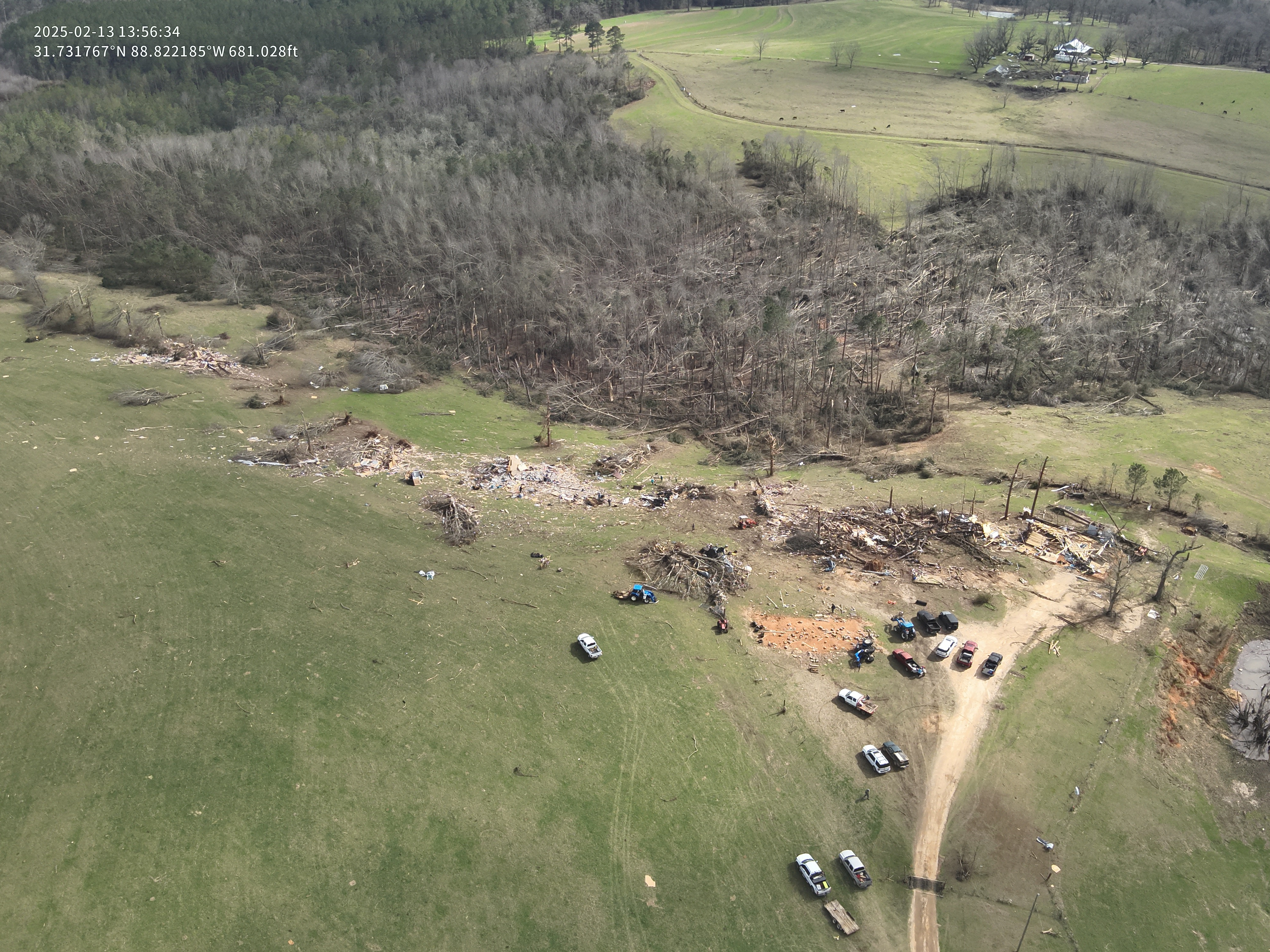
Major tree damage and an obliterated mobile home following an EF3 tornado near Whistler, Mississippi.

A second, more potent storm system impacted the southeast on February 12, bringing severe thunderstorms and a risk of tornadoes. That evening, a few tornadoes touched down in Mississippi and Alabama, including two strong tornadoes. In Mississippi, a high-end EF0 tornado moved through the east side of Columbia, heavily damaging a hardware store, destroying a few sheds, and damaging the roofs of homes in town. A supercell in Wayne County produced a powerful multiple-vortex EF3 tornado that touched down in a rural area to the east of Laurel before it tracked to the northeast near Whistler and dissipated near Matherville, prompting a PDS tornado warning. The tornado inflicted major structural damage to a few frame homes, and several mobile homes were completely swept away and obliterated, with their metal frames and debris strewn hundreds of yards across fields. Wooded areas suffered total deforestation, including large trees that were snapped, stripped of their branches, and sustained partial debarking. Some ground scouring also occurred, while a pickup truck, pieces of farming equipment, and RVs were thrown and destroyed as well. In Alabama, A low-end EF2 tornado passed near Tattlersville, prompting another PDS tornado warning to be issued. The tornado snapped or uprooted many trees in remote wooded areas and destroyed a poorly constructed house. A total of five tornadoes were confirmed, resulting in no fatalities and three injuries. The severe weather was also associated with a winter storm, which resulted in a fatality in Missouri.

=== February 13–16 (United States) ===
EFU	EF0	EF1	EF2	EF3	EF4	EF5
0	7	16	2	0	0	0

A winter storm brought heavy rain and strong winds to Southern California on February 13, producing a high-end EF0 tornado that damaged mobile homes in Oxnard. Moving across the United States, the storm system produced severe thunderstorms and tornadoes throughout the Deep South from February 15–16. Tornadoes were confirmed in Kentucky, Tennessee, Mississippi, Alabama, Louisiana, and Georgia, including a couple of strong tornadoes. The tornadoes were embedded in a fast-moving squall line, including an EF2 tornado that heavily damaged homes, destroyed a barn, and downed large trees near Bradford, Tennessee. In Alabama, another EF2 tornado touched down outside of Russellville and impacted areas in and around the small community of Waco, tearing the roof off of a house, destroying a silo and several outbuildings, tossing an ATV, and downing many trees and power lines. An EF1 tornado moved through Tuscumbia and Muscle Shoals, unroofing a school and another building. The towns of Collinsville, Mississippi and Rogersville, Alabama were also hit by EF1 tornadoes, resulting in minor to moderate damage. A total of 25 tornadoes were confirmed, resulting in no fatalities and two injuries. The storm system also spawned heavy winds in the Northeastern United States, with hurricane-force winds recorded at Camp David. One woman died due to the high winds in Philadelphia when a tree fell on her vehicle.

== March ==
=== March 4–5 (United States) ===
EFU	EF0	EF1	EF2	EF3	EF4	EF5
1	7	30	1	0	0	0

In early March, a storm system with intense wind shear brought strong winds and warm, moist air from the Gulf of Mexico to the southern Great Plains and the Deep South, creating conditions favorable for severe thunderstorms and a few strong tornadoes. On March 4, the Storm Prediction Center issued an Enhanced Risk, which included a 10% significant tornado risk area. Numerous weak tornadoes touched down later that afternoon and evening across Oklahoma, Texas, and Louisiana, including an EF1 tornado that struck Ada, Oklahoma, destroying an old brick building, causing considerable damage to several apartment buildings, businesses, and a school, and injuring one person. In Texas, a high-end EF1 tornado impacted Irving, where apartment buildings and the Irving Police Academy Family Advocacy building had partial roof loss. Another high-end EF1 tornado snapped many trees, destroyed a large metal outbuilding, and overturned campers on the property of the Barry Telford Unit prison and caused minor tree damage in the southern part of New Boston before dissipating. In Louisiana, an EF1 tornado caused minor damage on the north side of Shreveport, and another EF1 tornado damaged homes and downed trees in Boyce. Later that night, the storms moved into Mississippi and produced a strong EF2 tornado that touched down near Whistler in Wayne County, near an area that had been struck by an EF3 tornado the previous month on February 12. The tornado completely destroyed a few mobile homes and chicken houses, heavily damaged a couple of frame homes, tossed vehicles, and injured four people. Two additional weak tornadoes occurred in North Carolina and Virginia on March 5 before the outbreak came to an end. A total of 39 tornadoes were confirmed, resulting in no fatalities and 11 injuries.

=== March 14–16 (United States) ===
EFU	EF0	EF1	EF2	EF3	EF4	EF5
0	20	53	31	11	3	0

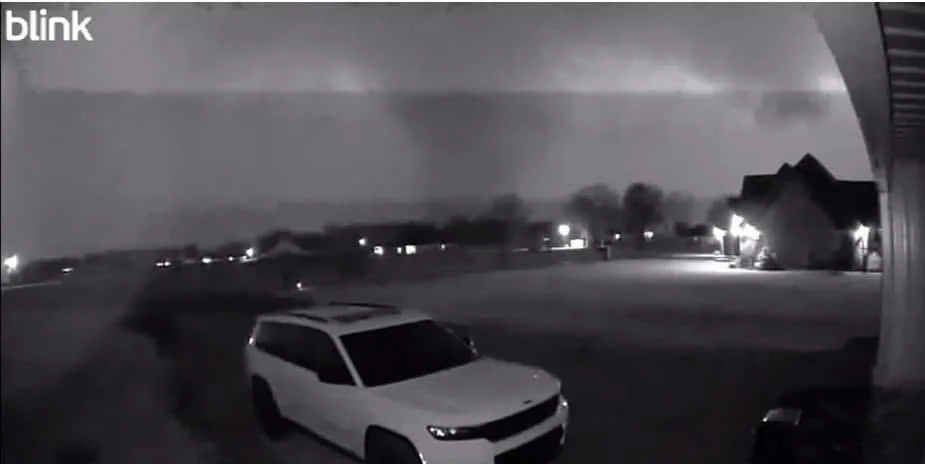
Doorbell camera still of a violent EF4 tornado that struck Diaz, Arkansas in the nighttime hours of March 14

A destructive and deadly tornado outbreak occurred across mainly portions of the Midwestern and Southeastern United States between March 14–16. On March 13, a trough moved through the West Coast, and the Storm Prediction Center issued a moderate risk for severe weather for parts of the Midwest and Southeast on March 14 as the trough moved west over the Rockies. The Day 2 outlook was upgraded to a tornado-driven high risk area for portions of Mississippi and Alabama, making it the third ever issuance of a Day 2 high risk, with the previous two being for April 7, 2006 and April 14, 2012.

On March 14, a moderate risk for severe weather was issued for the much of Iowa, Illinois, and Missouri, with a 15% risk for significant tornadoes centered around Southern Illinois and Southeastern Missouri. In the early evening, a PDS tornado watch was issued for portions of Southeast Missouri, Northeast Arkansas, Northern Mississippi, and more. Among the tornadoes that touched down that day were a long-track, high-end EF3 tornado that tracked through southern Missouri and prompted the issuance of a tornado emergency for Fremont and Van Buren, an EF2 tornado that moved into the Greater St. Louis area, notably crossing a St. Louis Lambert International Airport runway while a plane was taking off, a high-end EF4 tornado that caused catastrophic damage to a large farmstead near Jacksonport, before impacting a neighborhood in Diaz, Arkansas, a very long-track EF4 tornado that struck near Fifty-Six and rural areas within Izard County, Arkansas, an EF3 tornado that killed three people in Bakersfield, Missouri, a long-track, high-end EF3 tornado that went through Cushman and Cave City, Arkansas, killing three, and a low-end EF3 tornado that killed one person after ripping through a trailer park near Poplar Bluff, Missouri, Overall, 10 people in Missouri and three more in Arkansas were killed by tornadoes on the 14th.

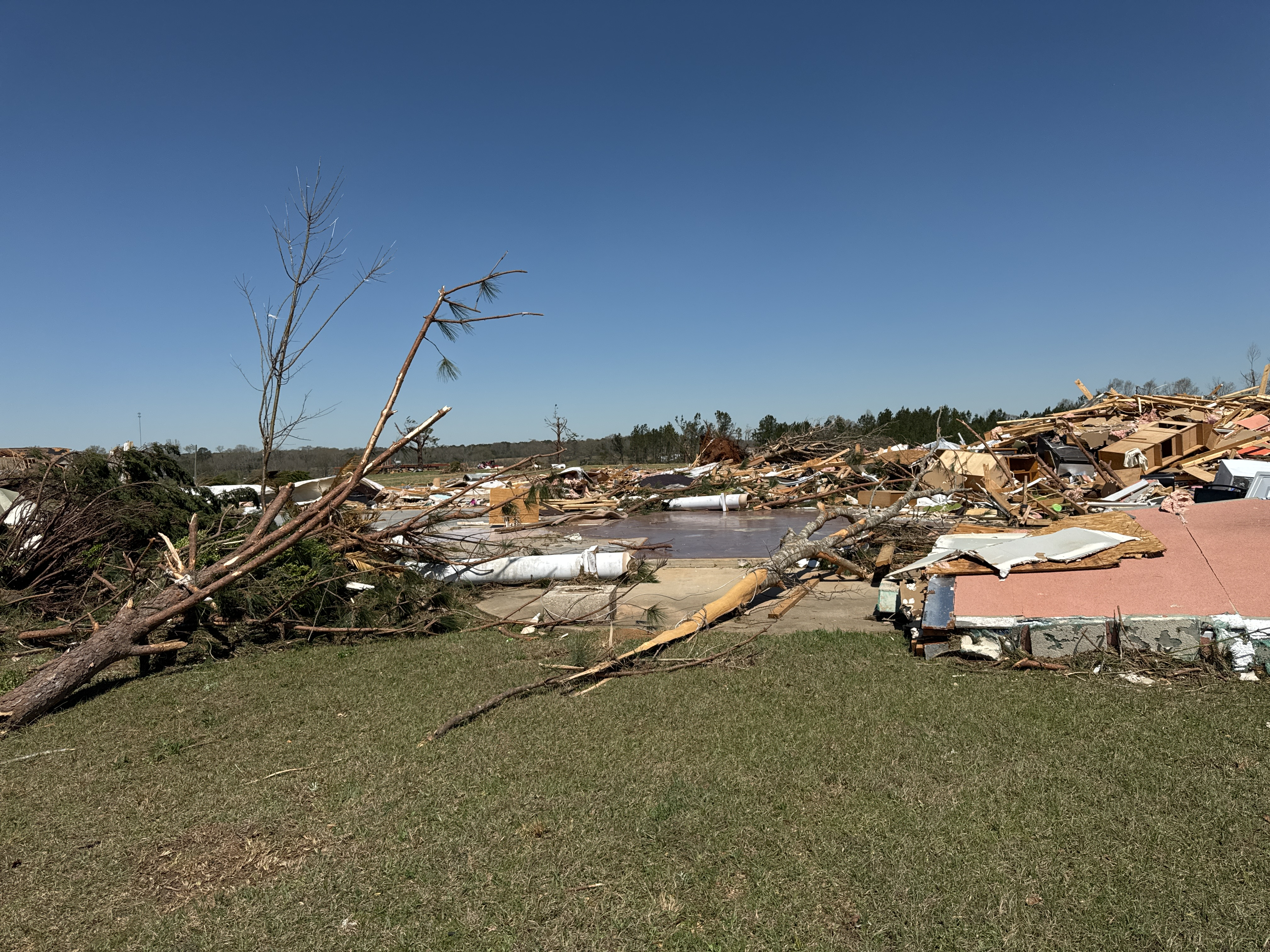
A well-anchored two-story home swept away at low-end EF4 intensity near Tylertown, Mississippi

On March 15, the high risk area continued into the Day 1 Outlook, including a 30 percent risk for significant tornadoes in central Mississippi and Alabama. In the late morning, a PDS tornado watch was issued for parts of Louisiana and nearly all of Mississippi and later much of Alabama as a tornado outbreak featuring "significant tornadoes, some of which should be long-track and potentially violent," was expected throughout the afternoon and evening. In the early afternoon, a tornado emergency was issued for parts of Walthall, Lawrence, Marion, and Jefferson Davis counties in Mississippi as a large, violent, long-track EF4 tornado was moving through the area; at least five people were killed and at least ten others were injured by this tornado. An EF2 tornado intersected its path just 41 minutes later. Another deadly EF3 tornado also tracked just east of the path of the long-track EF4 tornado, touching down while the latter was still on the ground. Tornadoes continued in Mississippi and Alabama throughout the afternoon and evening, including an EF2 tornado that struck Winterboro, Alabama, damaging a high school and killing one person, and an EF3 that killed two people near Plantersville, Alabama. Overall, seven people were killed in Mississippi and three more were killed in Alabama from tornadoes on the 15th.

On March 16, a slight risk for tornadoes was issued for the South Atlantic States as several weak tornadoes touched down across the East Coast. In all, 118 tornadoes were confirmed in the outbreak, making this the largest tornado outbreak ever recorded in March. In addition, 42 people were killed from this outbreak, including 23 tornadic deaths: Ten in Missouri, seven in Mississippi, and three each in Arkansas and Alabama.

=== March 15 (Uganda) ===
A powerful waterspout made landfall in Kalangala, damaging or destroying hundreds of structures across at least five villages, including a police station, homes, and businesses. Four people were killed and over 30 were injured.

=== March 19 (United States) ===
EFU	EF0	EF1	EF2	EF3	EF4	EF5
1	9	4	1	0	0	0

A strong low-pressure system brought high winds and thunderstorms to northern Illinois and Indiana on March 19. 15 tornadoes were confirmed, including three that impacted Gary, Indiana. The strongest to impact the city, an EF1 tornado, injured one person after a roof collapsed on him.

=== March 30–31 (United States) ===
EFU	EF0	EF1	EF2	EF3	EF4	EF5
0	21	20	3	0	0	0

A widespread severe weather outbreak impacted the Midwestern and Southern United States. 44 tornadoes touched down, including three EF2 tornadoes that occurred in the early morning hours of March 31, along with widespread damaging winds and large hail. An EF1 tornado struck the downtown area of Dothan, Alabama on March 30, injuring five students when it hit Dothan Preparatory Academy. The severe storms also resulted in two deaths and over 100,000 power outages. The severe weather outbreak caused $2 billion in damage.

== April ==
=== April 1–2 (Greece and Turkey) ===
IFU	IF0	IF0.5	IF1	IF1.5	IF2	IF2.5	IF3	IF4	IF5
0	0	0	3	3	1	0	0	0	0

Strong storms hit Southern Europe, bringing severe weather particularly to Turkey and Greece, spawning a small tornado outbreak. On April 1, an IF1 tornado went through downtown Rhodes. The next day, several tornadoes touched down in Turkey, including an IF2 tornado that tore through Bostanlı, doing damage to a cinder-block building, ripping sheet metal off of other buildings, and deroofing one building.

=== April 2–7 (United States) ===
EFU	EF0	EF1	EF2	EF3	EF4	EF5
1	35	82	33	6	0	0

Radar animation of the tornado outbreak and floods.

A slow-moving weather system resulted in both a devastating tornado outbreak as well as historic life-threatening flash floods throughout the Southern and Midwestern United States from April 2–7, spawning 157 tornadoes in total. The Storm Prediction Center (SPC) issued a high risk for the first day of the outbreak, April 2, which would be the busiest day as 74 tornadoes touched down across nine states. That evening, a high-end EF3 tornado destroyed multiple homes near Latty, Missouri. Later, a large, multiple-vortex high-end EF3 tornado impacted Bay, Lake City, and Monette, Arkansas, derailing two freight trains, and destroying high-tension power line trusses and several homes. A tornado emergency was declared for Lake City as the tornado struck, and injured eight people. Additionally, one indirect fatality occurred in association with an EF2 tornado that passed through Delta, Missouri as it moved along Route 25; this tornado damaged approximately 200 structures along its path. Tornado continued throughout the overnight hours into April 3. Another EF3 tornado damaged or destroyed buildings on the east side of Jeffersontown, Kentucky while an EF2 tornado injured three people along the Mississippi-Tennessee state line northwest of Walnut, Mississippi. A destructive high-end EF3 tornado devastated Selmer, Tennessee, heavily damaging or destroying homes and businesses, obliterating manufactured homes, and killing five people. Soon after, a second tornado emergency was issued as another large, long-track high-end EF3 tornado passed near Slayden, Mississippi before crossing the state line and striking Grand Junction, Tennessee at EF2 strength, heavily damaging or destroying several homes, businesses, and manufactured homes, and collapsing a metal truss tower along its path. Two people were killed and three others were injured in a mobile home that was obliterated as the tornado crossed the state line.

Relatively lower, but still significant, tornadic activity continued over the next several days. On April 4, an EF2 tornado impacted the Lone Star, Texas area, heavily damaging homes, snapping trees, and tossing six vehicles. The next morning on April 5, another EF2 tornado damaged or destroyed outbuilding and manufactured homes and injured one person near Wynne, Arkansas. Later, a long-tracked EF2 tornado caused widespread damage to homes, outbuildings, power poles, and trees as it passed near Thaxton, Hurricane, and New Albany, Mississippi. On April 6, an EF2 tornado struck Stringer, Mississippi killing a person in a mobile home that was obliterated. Weak tornadoes were observed on April 7 as the outbreak came to an end. Overall, nine tornadic fatalities occurred as a result of this outbreak, with many more being killed by the devastating flooding that accompanied it.

=== April 4 (Spain) ===
IFU	IF0	IF0.5	IF1	IF1.5	IF2	IF2.5	IF3	IF4	IF5
0	0	0	2	0	1	0	0	0	0

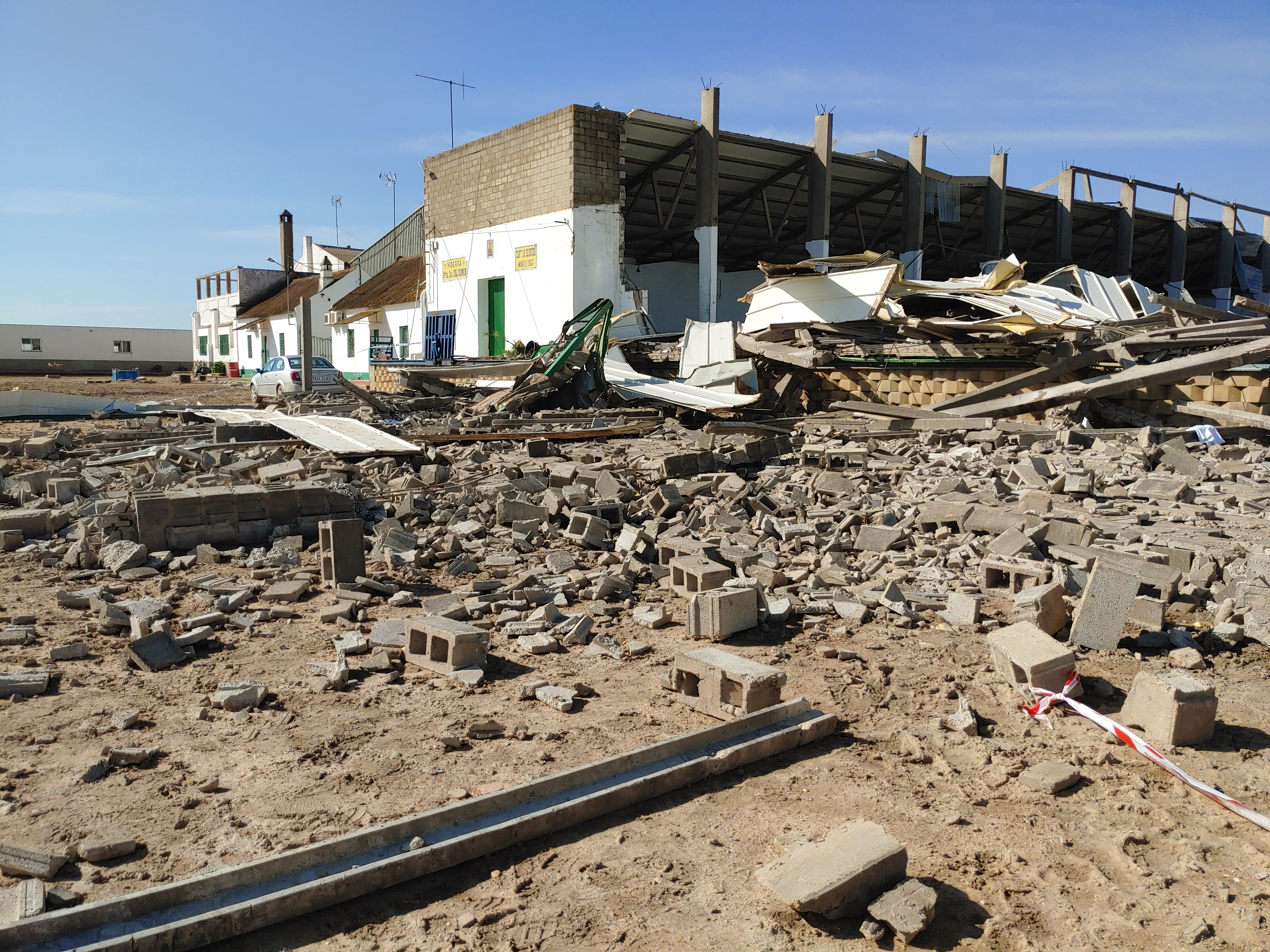
The Cortijo El Sequero warehouse that collapsed, killing three workers inside.

As Storm Nuria made landfall in Iberia, at least three tornadoes touched down in the province of Huelva. An IF1 tornado was confirmed in San Bartolomé de la Torre, collapsing a greenhouse and injuring four workers. Another IF1 tornado struck Moguer, damaging crops and trees. A strong IF2 tornado struck the town of Coria del Río, collapsing an agricultural warehouse and killing three workers.

=== April 17–20 (United States) ===
EFU	EF0	EF1	EF2	EF3	EF4	EF5
4	22	26	4	1	0	0

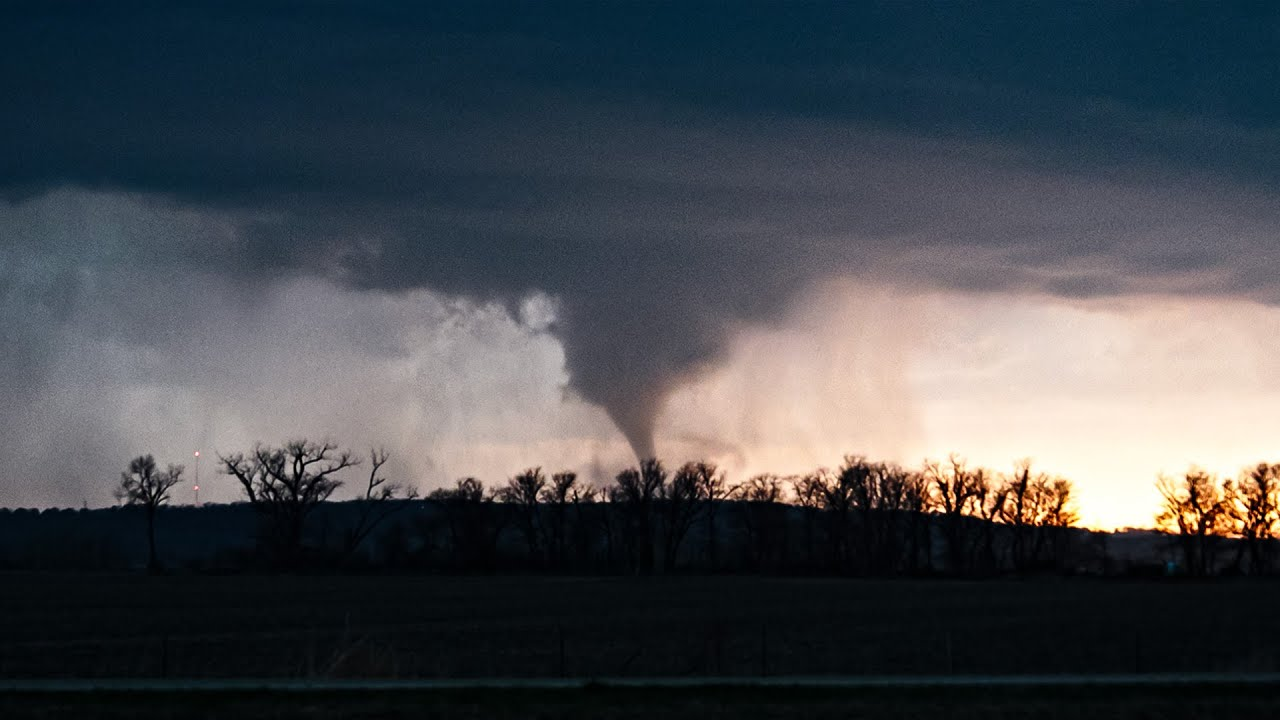
EF3 tornado in Bennington, Nebraska.

A four-day outbreak of tornadoes took place from April 17–20 across the Midwest and parts of the South as a slow-moving upper-level trough moved through the region. On April 17, an intense tornado touched down northeast of Bennington, Nebraska, producing low-end EF3 damage before later causing additional damage in Nashville. Additionally, a very large high-end EF1 tornado prompted the issuance of a tornado emergency for the city of Essex, Iowa. Tornado activity remained relatively low for the remainder of the outbreak, though a high-end EF1 tornado killed one and injured two as it destroyed homes in the town of Spaulding, Oklahoma on April 20. This was the only tornadic fatality of the outbreak. However, two people were killed due to flooding related to the storm system in Oklahoma.

=== April 27–30 (United States) ===
EFU	EF0	EF1	EF2	EF3	EF4	EF5
12	14	16	5	1	0	0

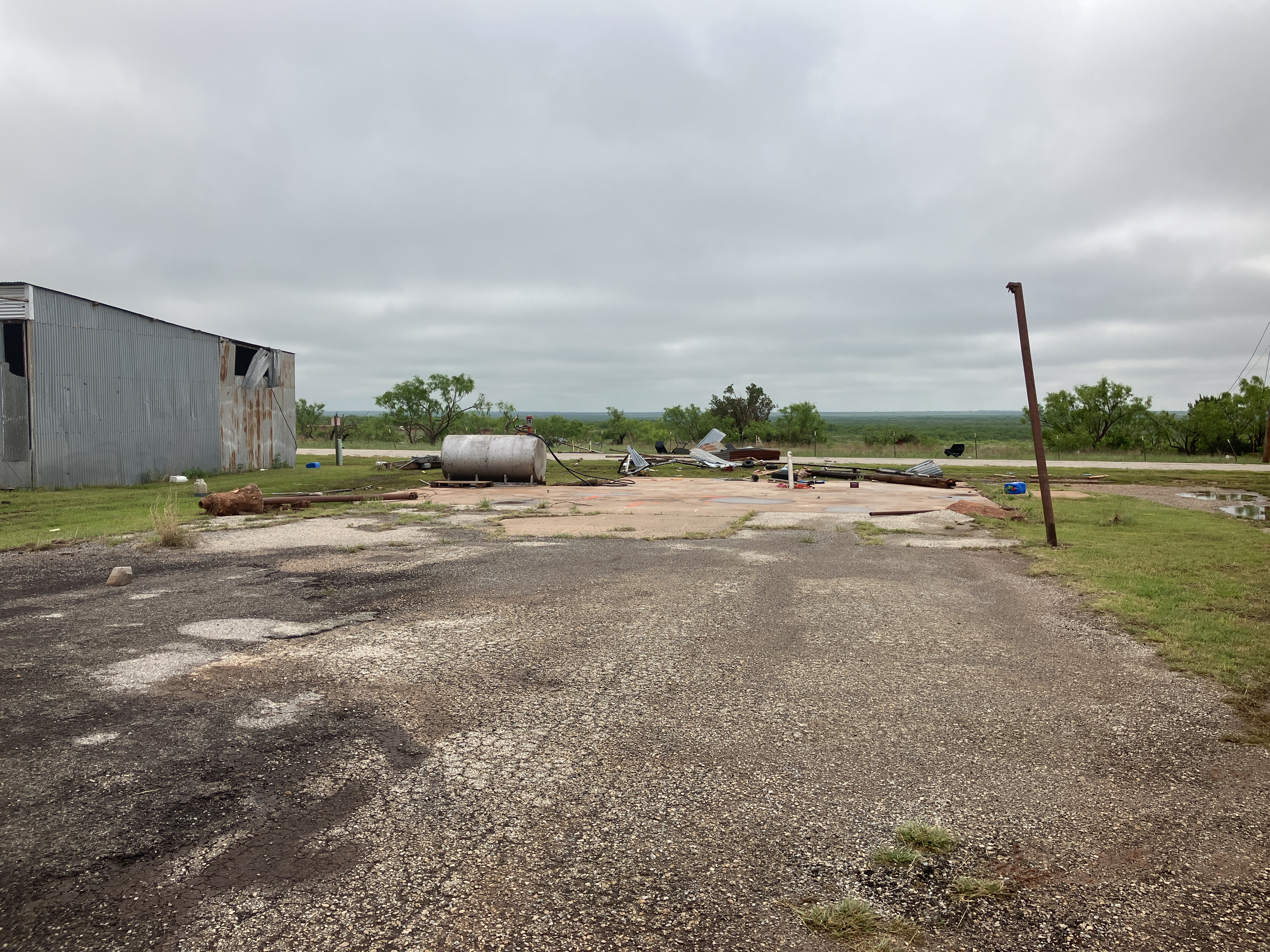
An aircraft hangar completely swept away at low-end EF2 intensity in Seymour Airport.

A tornado outbreak lasting four days took place across parts of the Midwest, Southern United States, and Great Plains regions of the US from April 27–30. On April 27, activity was focused on Nebraska, with several tornadoes, including three rated EF2, being confirmed. The Bingham-Ashby tornado in particular was the widest ever confirmed by the National Weather Service in North Platte, at 2,200 yards (2,000 m). The following day, a moderate risk for severe weather was forecasted, driven by a 15% chance for significant tornadoes; this moderate risk was centered on the Upper Midwest region of the United States. Activity largely failed to materialize, with just 12 tornadoes being confirmed, seven of which occurred in Wisconsin. More severe weather occurred the following day, with tornadoes occurring in Oklahoma, Arkansas, Missouri and Texas. The strongest of these tornadoes was rated EF3 after tearing through parts of Seymour, Texas, including the Seymour Airport. The outbreak concluded the next day, with several more tornadoes being confirmed, including one rated EF2 after damaging multiple farms in Fayette County, Illinois. In all, 48 tornadoes were confirmed in this outbreak.

== May ==
=== May 2–4 (Europe) ===
IFU	IF0	IF0.5	IF1	IF1.5	IF2	IF2.5	IF3	IF4	IF5
3	1	0	6	4	0	0	0	0	0

A severe weather outbreak produced scattered tornadoes across Europe from May 2–4, producing a total of 14 tornadoes across several countries. On May 2, conditions in Iberia, namely a cold front pulling warm, moist air from the Mediterranean into an unstable environment with high wind shear, allowed for the development of long-lasting supercells. Two tornadoes touched down in eastern Portugal: one IF1.5 tornado near Beja caused significant roof damage while another IF1 tornado near Campo Maior caused widespread damage to the neighborhood of Degolados and injured one person. Remnants of this system continued to create a risk of severe weather in Portugal the next day, as a waterspout moved ashore off the coast of Sesimbra and a large IF1 tornado tracked through Sardoal in central Portugal. Similar conditions in parts of Southern Europe spawned an IF1.5 tornado in Turkey on May 3 and a landspout tornado in Cyprus the next day. Throughout Central Europe, conditions were similar to Iberia, supporting supercell development. Three tornadoes ravaged forests and damaged buildings throughout Germany on May 3, and the weakening system produced two tornadoes in Belarus the next day, concluding the outbreak.

=== May 4 (Guadeloupe) ===
On the afternoon of May 4, a rare tornado struck parts of Baie-Mahault on the French Caribbean island of Guadeloupe, producing localized structural damage in the residential neighbourhood of Belcourt. Strong, concentrated winds uprooted trees, blew debris across streets, and damaged roofs and light structures in several homes. Fire and rescue services were deployed to the area to assist residents and begin damage assessments as the storm passed through. No fatalities were reported, and French authorities placed the island under an orange weather alert for heavy rain and thunderstorms as conditions remained unstable following the event.

=== May 8 (China) ===
An EF1 tornado struck Qidong County in Hengyang, Hunan Province. Two people were killed when their house collapsed, and several more were injured. Six houses collapsed and more than 100 were damaged.

=== May 8–9 (Brazil) ===
EFU	EF0	EF1	EF2	EF3	EF4	EF5
4	0	0	1	0	0	0

On May 8, two tornadoes touched down in Rio Grande do Sul. The next day, a wide tornado struck Erval Grande, being officially rated an EF2 by the PREVOTS group. The event lasted about 15 minutes, damaging around 285 homes, displacing 55 families, and overall affecting over 1,000 people. The storm also wrecked power lines and blocked roads with fallen trees. The mayor declared a state of emergency, and relief efforts provided shelter and supplies. Additionally, a tornado struck Palmitos in Santa Catarina, killing one man when a tree hit him. Another damaging tornado was confirmed in Santo Amaro da Imperatriz.

=== May 15–16 (United States) ===
EFU	EF0	EF1	EF2	EF3	EF4	EF5
4	15	26	11	3	2	0

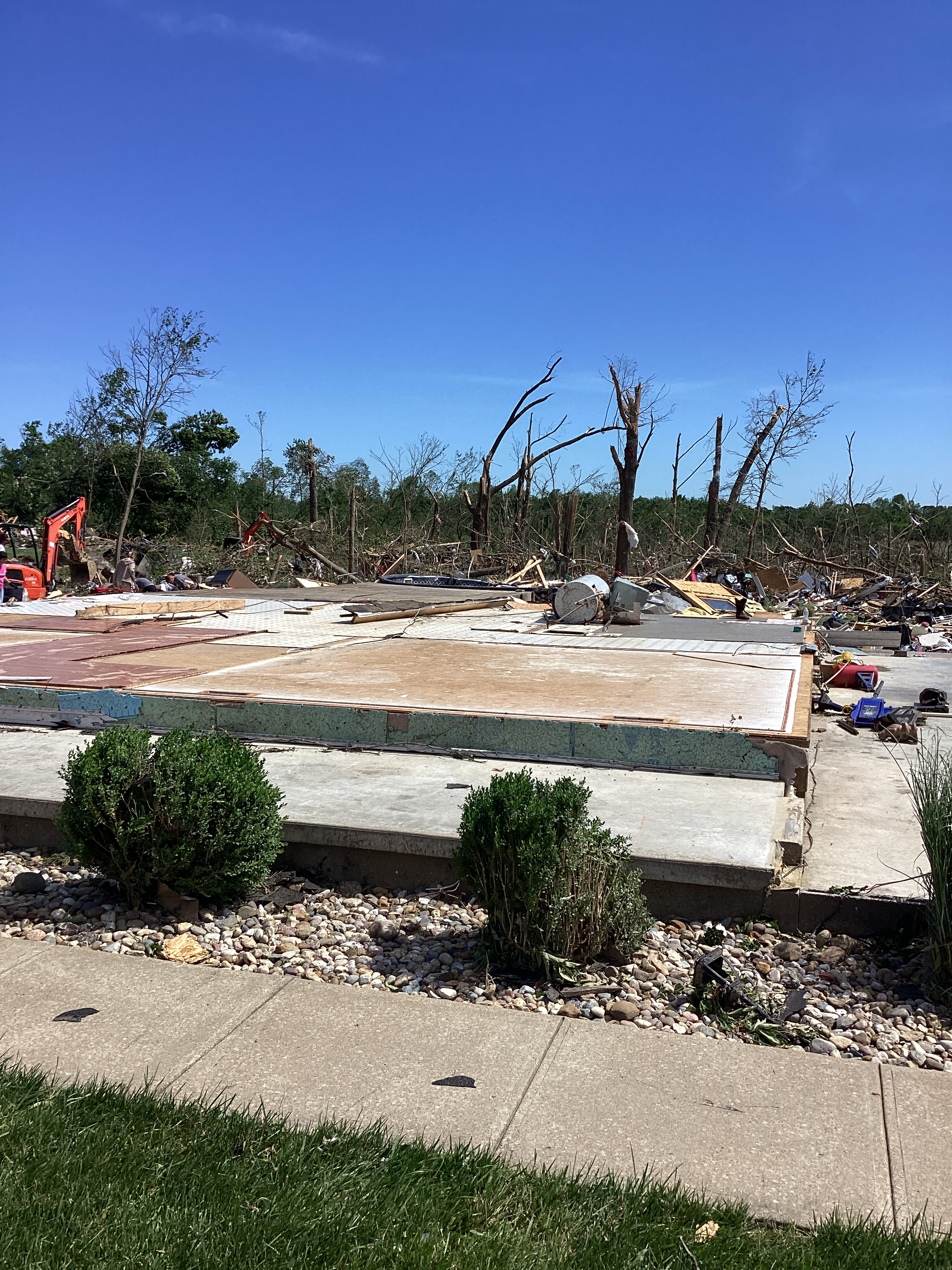
A two-story home south of Marion, Illinois swept away at high-end EF4 intensity.

A significant tornado outbreak produced 61 tornadoes in portions of the Midwestern and Southeastern United States on May 15–16 due to a negatively tilted mid-level atmospheric trough that moved through the Upper Midwest. On May 15, tornadic activity was centered on the Great Lakes Region with 31 tornadoes touching down throughout the day. An EF2 tornado damaged several structures near Colby, Wisconsin. One supercell thunderstorm produced six tornadoes, including an EF2 tornado that injured one person as it passed through Juneau, and another EF2 tornado that struck Mayville. Four more tornadoes touched down from this initial round of storms after midnight as well.

A moderate risk for severe weather was issued for parts of the Mid-South and Midwest on May 16 due to the possibility of several long-tracked, intense tornadoes that afternoon and evening. An extremely large early afternoon EF3 tornado struck the Greater St. Louis area, causing widespread destruction to trees, power lines, homes, traffic lights, and other structures, killing four people, and injuring 38 others. The tornado was one of the costliest tornadoes in US history, with monetary damage estimated at $1.6 billion USD. Another deadly EF3 tornado destroyed homes and mobile homes and killed two more people near Blodgett, Missouri. A stray high-end EF1 tornado also caused considerable damage in Baltimore, Maryland. A violent high-end EF4 tornado injured seven people and prompted the issuance of a tornado emergency for the Marion, Illinois area. A strong EF2 tornado in Linton killed one person. In Kentucky, an EF3 tornado caused intense damage in the Morganfield area, and a destructive EF4 tornado struck the cities of Somerset and London, killing 19 people. Overall, 26 tornadic fatalities occurred as a result of this tornado outbreak.

=== May 18–21 (United States) ===
EFU	EF0	EF1	EF2	EF3	EF4	EF5
15	35	60	13	10	0	0

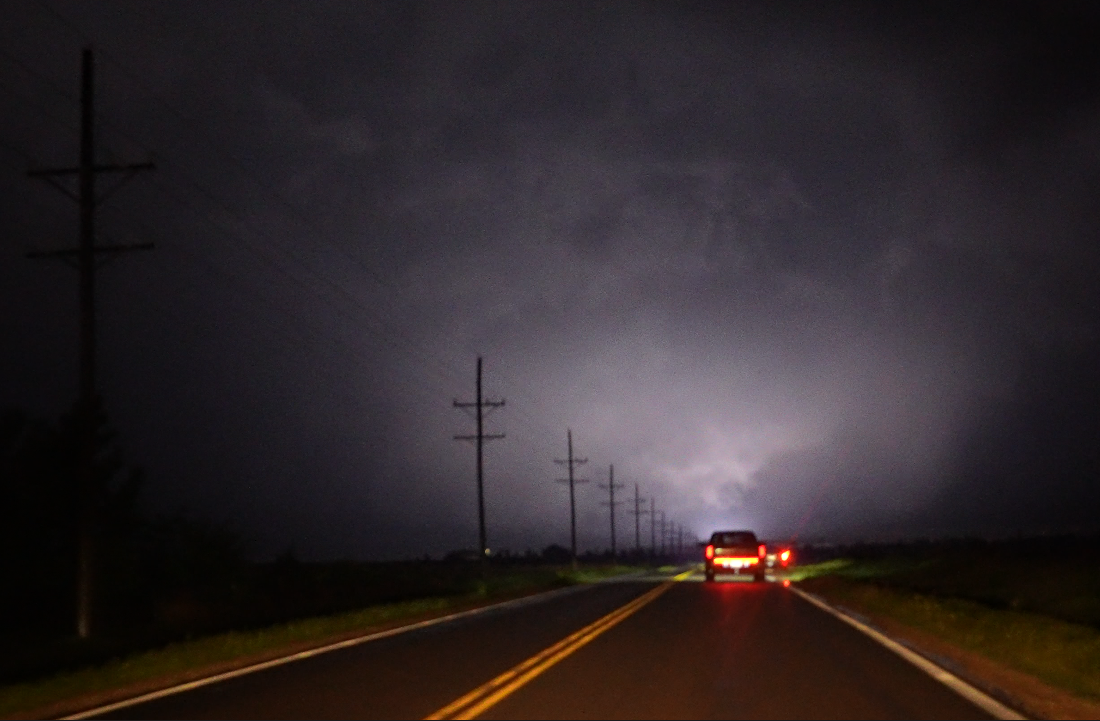
Large EF3 tornado crossing US 183 south of Greensburg, Kansas.

Another powerful trough ejection, coupled with deep moisture return from the Gulf of Mexico, prompted another damaging tornado outbreak, moving from the Southern Great Plains towards the Southeast. Numerous tornadoes touched down, several of which were strong to intense. On the May 18, an EF3 tornado caused severe damage in the town of Grinnell, Kansas across its long path, while an EF1 tornado caused four injuries when it struck Gordon, Texas. After dark, a powerful, cyclic supercell developed in south-central Kansas, eventually producing a long family of eight tornadoes, five of which were rated EF3. Two of these prompted tornado emergencies: one as it approached the towns of Greensburg and Brenham, and another that directly hit the small town of Plevna. Tornado activity shifted towards the Southeast by May 20, and in the evening, another tornado emergency was issued for an EF2 tornado that went through Madison, Alabama, dissipating just before reaching Huntsville. In all, 133 tornadoes were confirmed from the outbreak.

=== May 25 (Chile) ===
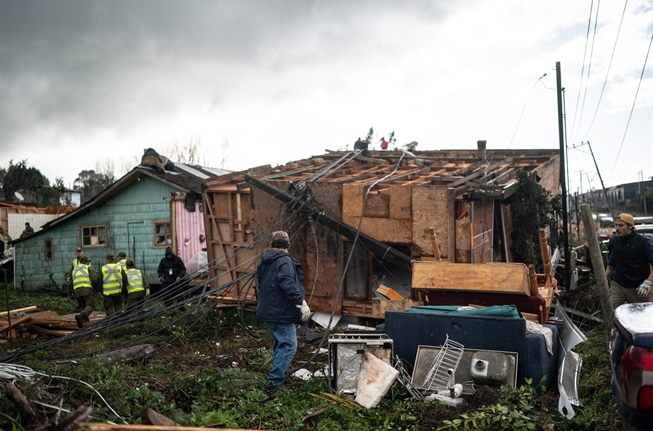
President of Chile Gabriel Boric surveys EF1 tornado damage in Puerto Varas.

A tornado struck the city of Puerto Varas, Chile, in the Los Lagos Region, injuring 13 people and damaging 250 homes. It was preliminarily rated EF1 by the Chilean Meteorological Directorate. The storm impacted 150–250 homes, a supermarket, and infrastructure, including power lines, resulting in over 10,000 households losing electricity.

=== May 25 (New Mexico) ===
A tornado struck near the town of Floyd, New Mexico, where it damaged trees, snapped 30-35 power poles near their bases, and mangled a farm sprinkler system and caused minor fence and roof damage. The tornado was rated low-end EF1 by the National Weather Service Albuquerque, New Mexico with winds of 90 miles per hour (140 km/h). At the 2026 American Meteorological Society (AMS) Madison Summit, a photogrammetric analysis by Anton Seimon was presented which showed the tornado had winds of 90 metres per second (200 mph; 320 km/h), reaching the EF5 wind speed threshold.

=== May 29–30 (United States) ===
EFU	EF0	EF1	EF2	EF3	EF4	EF5
7	5	4	2	0	0	0

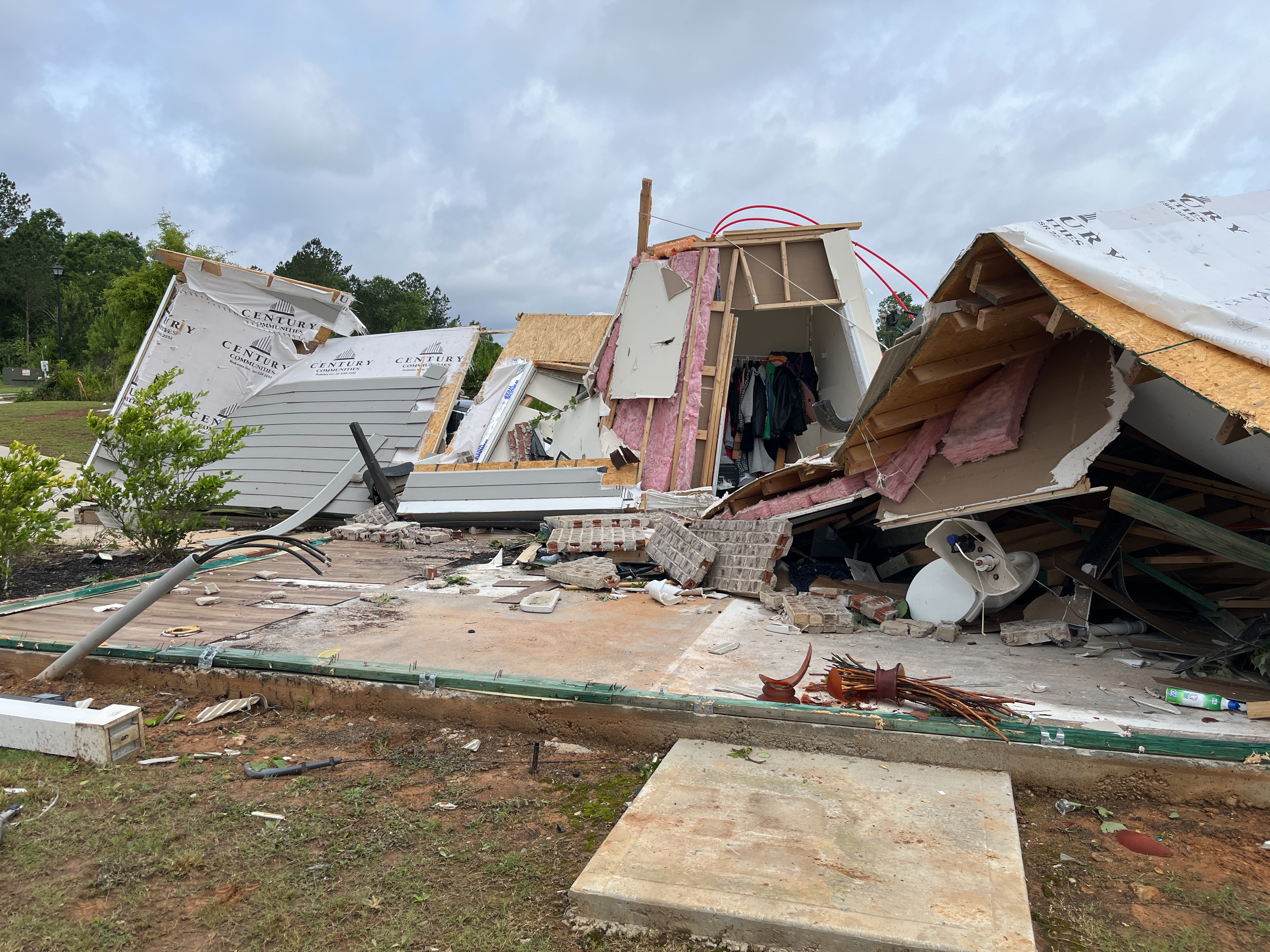
High-end EF2 damage to a home near McDonough, Georgia.

A small tornado event, which produced 18 tornadoes over two days, took place mainly across the Southeastern United States on May 29–30. On May 29, a strong EF2 tornado struck Locust Grove, Georgia. Two people were thrown from their house as the tornado demolished their home, injuring both, one critically. The tornado was then caught on video crossing I-75. In addition, three rare tornadoes touched down in the Western United States, two of these in Utah, specifically in Herriman and Logan. The third tornado affected Loving, New Mexico, all three of these tornadoes were rated EFU. Early the following morning, a strong EF2 tornado struck in rural Washington County, Kentucky. Several homes, mobile homes, and outbuildings were heavily damaged or destroyed by the tornado, which killed one person and injured 14 others. In addition, an unwarned EF0 tornado rolled campers, damaged homes and barns, and injured five people southwest of Loudon, Tennessee. This event caused $915 million in losses.

=== May 29 (Philippines) ===
A EF2 tornado struck 5 villages in Tupi, South Cotabato where it damaged 7 homes, toppled electrical posts, and uprooted trees. two people were rushed to a nearby hospital while twelve others were treated for first-aid injuries. Almost ₱19 million worth of agricultural crops were also damaged.

== June ==
=== June 1 (France) ===
A strong tornado affected the Loire area, particularly the communes of Lérigneux and Roche-en-Forez. Several houses had their roofs partially or completely ripped off, and significant tree damage was also observed. Additionally, one person was injured. The tornado was officially rated an IF2.

=== June 3 (Australia) ===
A tornado struck near the town of Frankland River in the state of Western Australia, producing localized but notable damage amid a line of severe thunderstorms. The tornado developed as a low-pressure system brought intense convective storms to the region, and winds associated with the circulation overturned a utility vehicle and damaged farm equipment, including a tractor, on rural properties. A farmhand working on fencing was knocked to the ground and sustained minor injuries before being treated at a local hospital. Trees were snapped or uprooted in the vicinity, and local emergency services responded to calls for assistance in the aftermath of the event.

=== June 4 (Germany) ===
A strong IF2 tornado occurred in Baden-Württemberg and Bavaria and struck the community of Donaustetten. Birch trees were snapped, multiple houses were damaged, and several vehicles, lampposts and other objects were damaged severely.

=== June 5 (United States) ===
EFU	EF0	EF1	EF2	EF3	EF4	EF5
11	2	2	3	0	0	0

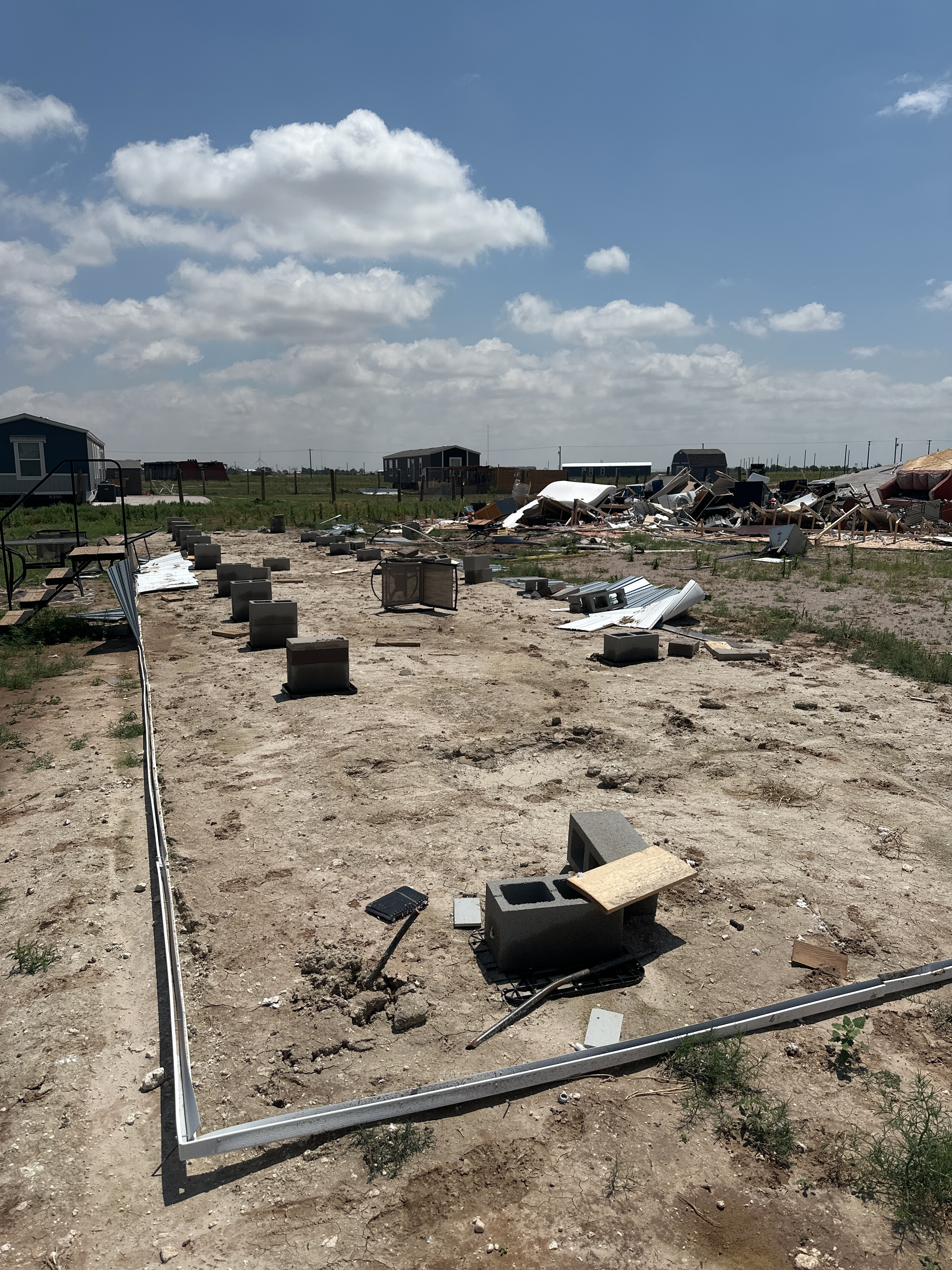
A mobile home swept away near Lubbock, Texas.

A single supercell produced a family of eight tornadoes as it moved eastward towards the Lubbock, Texas metropolitan area. The second tornado was a large, strong EF2 tornado that moved through open desert near the town of Morton, flipping center pivots and snapping wooden power poles. The tornado was highly photographed and videoed by nearby storm chasers, and it was researched by nearby research teams during the LIFT Project. Dr. Sean Waugh, with the National Severe Storms Laboratory (NSSL), researched the tornado. Using the NSSL Hail Camera Truck, positioned 200 metres (220 yd) away from the tornado, he captured a 1.6-inch-diameter (4.1 cm) hailstone that was "being ejected from the tornado" at speeds up to 202 mph (325 km/h). The hailstone was only visible to the camera for six frames; a total of 0.0182 seconds. The supercell also produced two other EF2 tornadoes along with two EF1 tornadoes and three EFU tornadoes. One of the EF1 tornadoes injured two people in a trailer park northeast of Smyer. A swath of very strong outflow winds up to 115 mph (185 km/h) and very large hail up to 2.5 in (6.4 cm) in diameter impacted western and southwestern Lubbock following the dissipation of the final tornado. Windows and skylights were shattered, and trees and roofs were damaged throughout this area. Two other weak tornadoes also touched down earlier that day.

=== June 15 (Armenia) ===
On the afternoon of June 15, a damaging IF1.5 tornado struck the town of Aparan and the nearby village of Lusagyugh, causing widespread structural and infrastructure damage. The tornado tore roofs from residential and public buildings and damaged large sections of the local power and transportation network. Damage assessments by regional authorities reported that the roofs of approximately 20 apartment buildings and 86 homes were damaged, along with three schools, a cultural center, several administrative and law enforcement buildings, and numerous government facilities. Around 70 power lines were downed, 30 vehicles were damaged, and more than 100 trees were snapped or uprooted. A total of five people were injured, primarily by flying debris and collapsing roofing materials. Emergency services and municipal crews were deployed to clear debris and restore utilities in the aftermath.

=== June 17 (Norway) ===
A strong IF2 tornado struck a campsite near Støren in Trøndelag, Norway. Several caravans were tossed and flipped, some of which landed in the Gaula. Numerous trees were snapped or uprooted, a barn was damaged, light poles were downed and outdoor furniture was tossed around. No injuries or fatalities occurred.

=== June 17–18 (Russia) ===
IFU	IF0	IF0.5	IF1	IF1.5	IF2	IF2.5	IF3	IF4	IF5
1	0	0	4	1	3	0	0	0	0

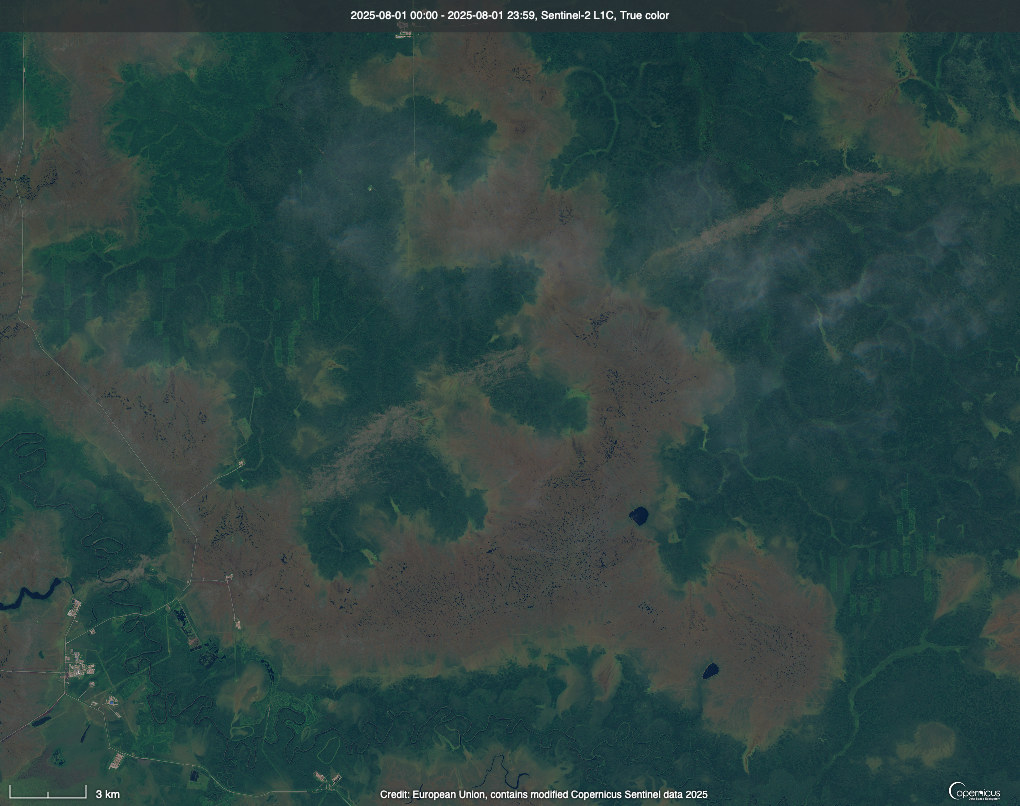
An F3/IF1.5 tornado left a large scar through the Siberian forest.

At least 9 tornadoes touched down in unpopulated areas of Russia. On June 17, a long track F3/IF2 tornado tracked through Khanty-Mansia. It was found to be over 2.5 km (1.6 mi) wide, tying it for the widest tornado ever recorded in Russia. The tornado was likely stronger than its rating, but the only damage it inflicted was to trees. The next day, an IF2 tornado snapped reinforced concrete power poles near Kirovskaya in Rostov Oblast.

=== June 19–22 (United States and Canada) ===
EFU	EF0	EF1	EF2	EF3	EF4	EF5
2	10	16	5	1	0	1

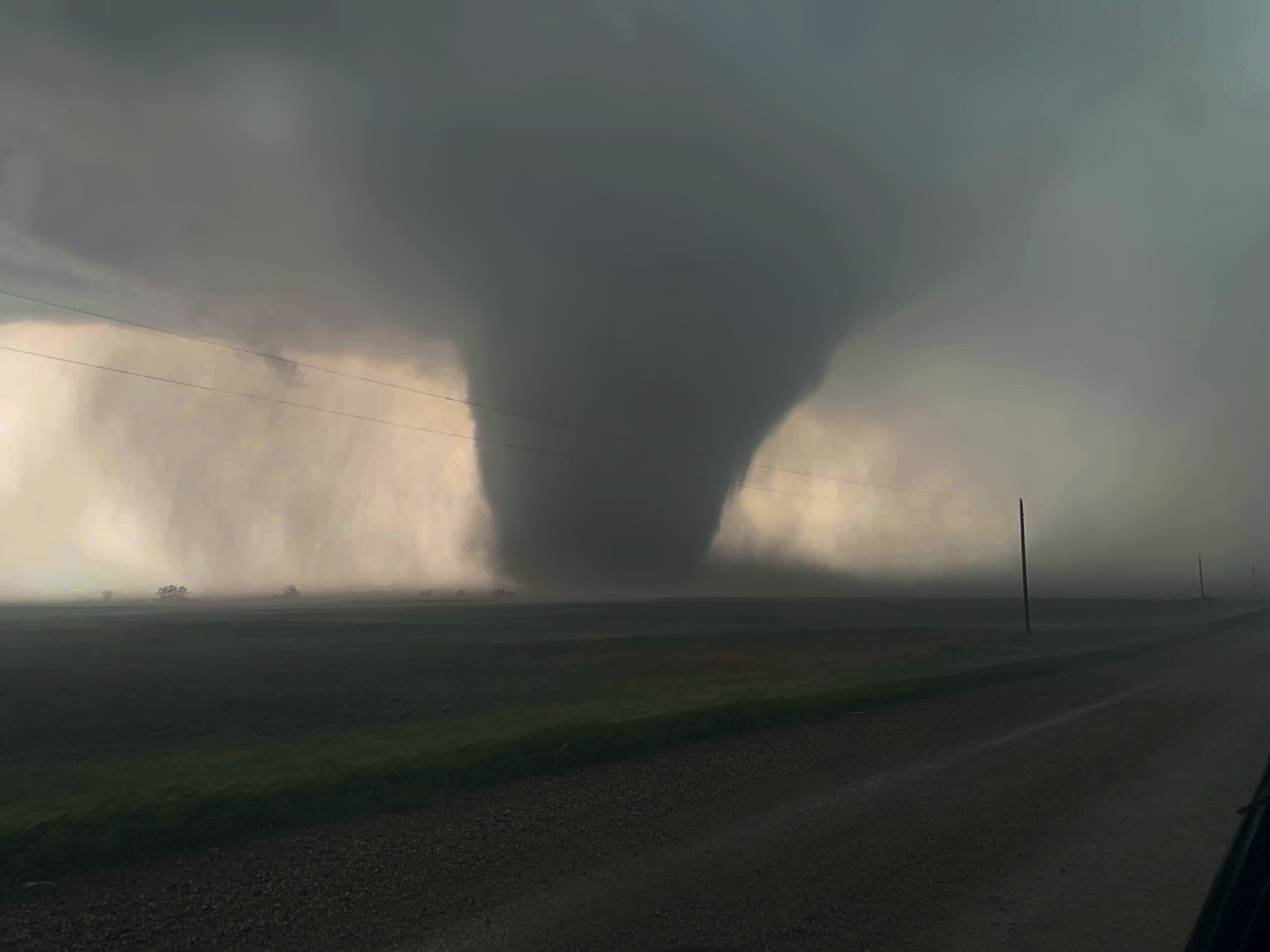
A large EF3 tornado in Barnes County on June 20.

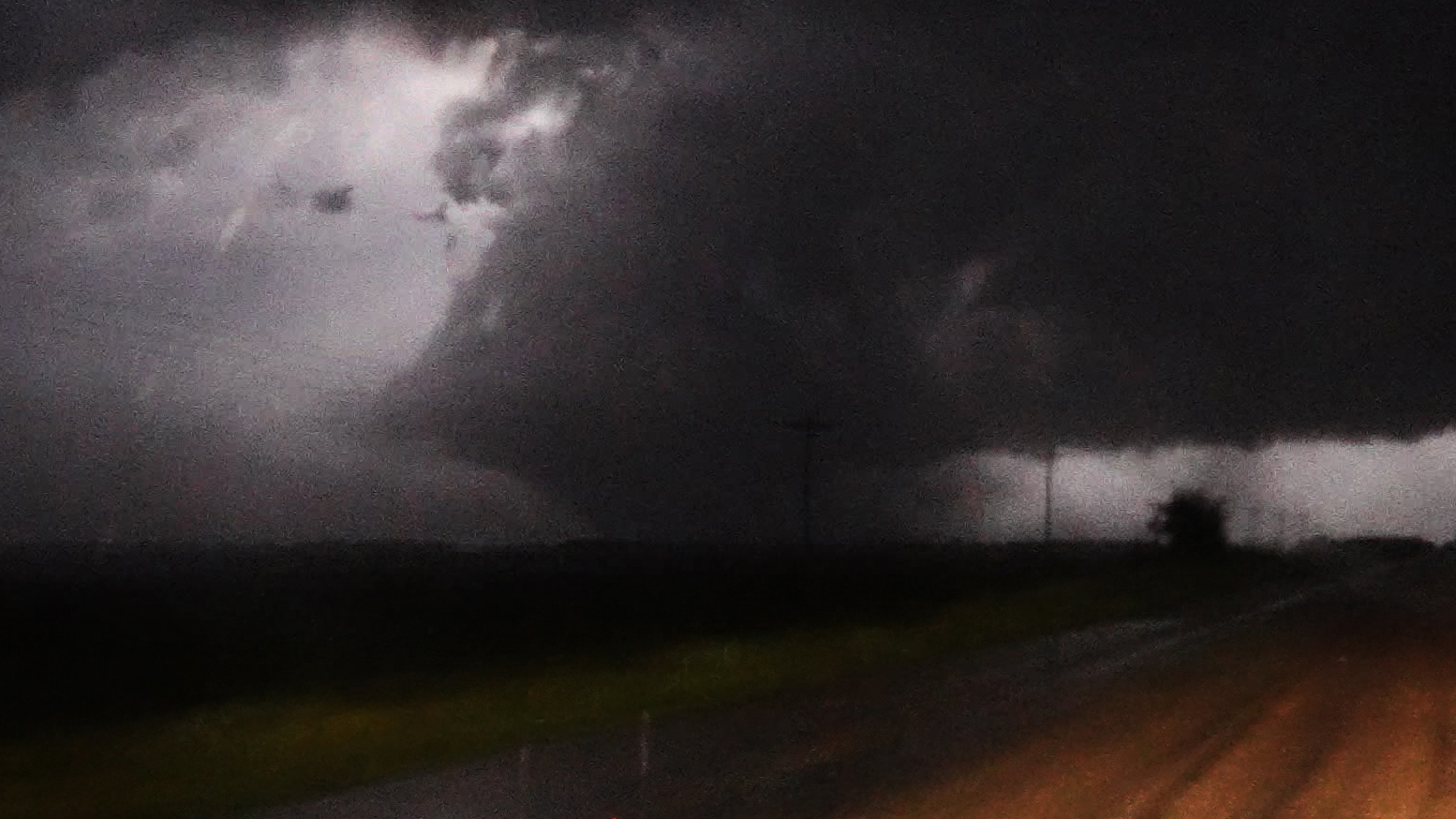
An EF5 tornado southeast of Enderlin, North Dakota.

A period of enhanced severe weather occurred across both the northern part of the United States, and the southern part of Canada from June 19–22. Environment Canada confirmed that 10 tornadoes touched down in Saskatchewan, including two EF2 tornadoes on June 19. On June 20, a significant and damaging outbreak unfolded over North Dakota. During the event, an intense EF3 tornado impacted a farmstead in western Barnes County, near Spiritwood. A large steel building and two-story residence were damaged or destroyed, while another farmhouse to the north was demolished. An EF2 tornado impacted areas south of Valley City, causing considerable roof damage to one home. A large and exceptionally violent EF5 tornado struck at nightfall as it passed east of Enderlin, tossing train cars, devastating farmsteads, and killing three people. The tornado was initially rated as an EF3 after it happened, however on October 6, a reanalysis conducted by National Weather Service surveyors, and forensic engineers confirmed wind speeds exceeded the threshold needed for the EF5 rating. The upgrade was prompted by the tornado derailing 33 train cars, an event that was not initially used for damage assessment but became a key factor based on new research. This reclassification marks the first such rated tornado in the United States in 12 years, since the 2013 Moore, Oklahoma tornado. A powerful derecho also produced hurricane-force winds across Montana, North Dakota, Minnesota, and South Dakota, with the highest confirmed wind gust reaching 120 mph (190 km/h) near Bemidji, Minnesota. The remnants of the system, a line of thunderstorms, moved into New York by the early morning hours of June 22, spawning an EF1 tornado that struck Clark Mills. The tornado snapped and uprooted many trees, with several trees falling on homes, which resulted in three fatalities.

=== June 22–23 (Brazil) ===
EFU	EF0	EF1	EF2	EF3	EF4	EF5
5	0	0	1	0	0	0

At least six tornadoes were confirmed in Santa Catarina from June 22–23. The strongest of these, rated EF2 by PREVOTS, damaged infrastructure in the Passos Maia municipality and also downed large trees.

=== June 28–29 (United States) ===
EFU	EF0	EF1	EF2	EF3	EF4	EF5
1	2	2	2	1	0	0

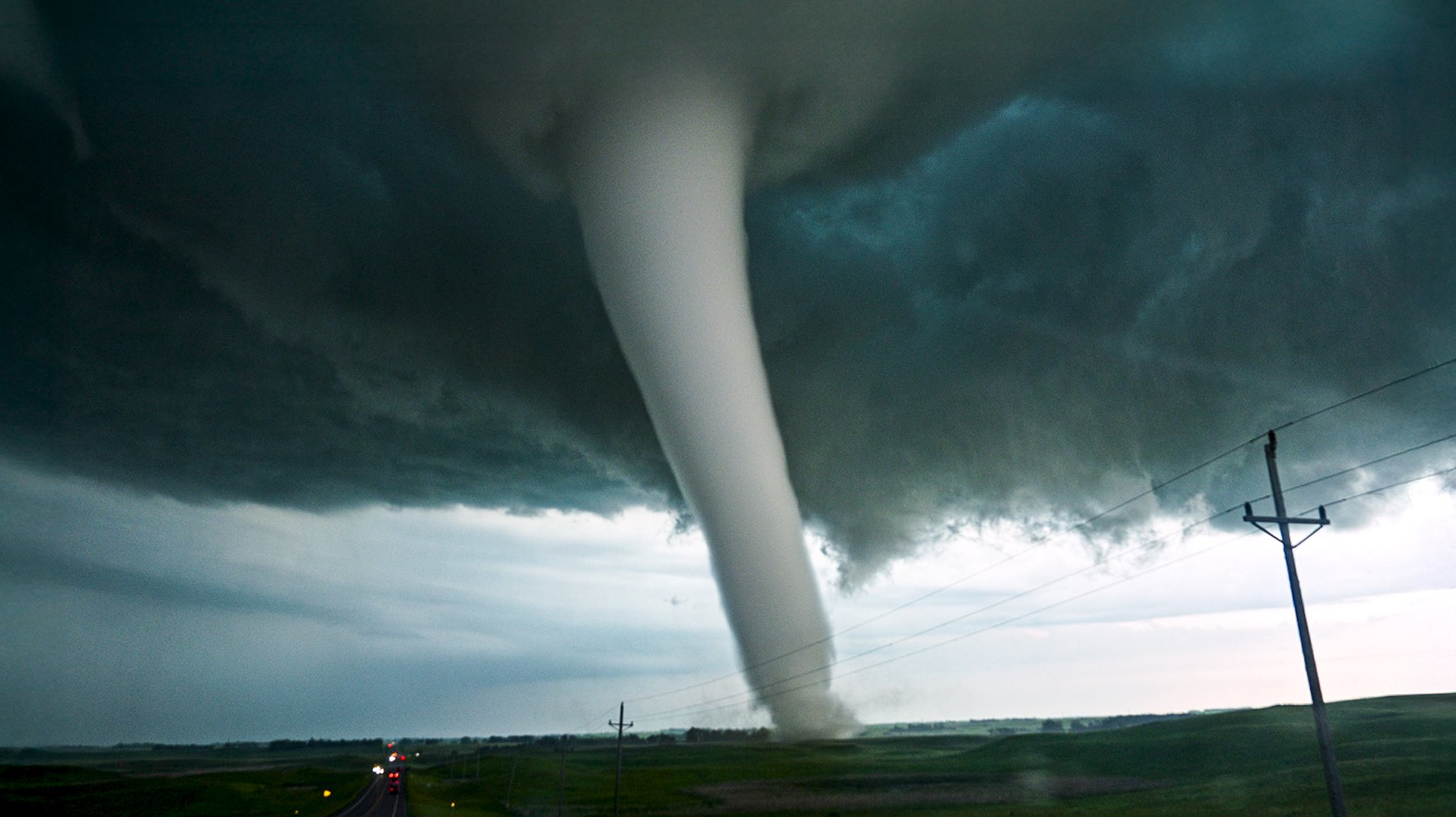
An EF3 tornado near Gary in Deuel County, South Dakota.

A small tornado event occurred late on June 28 and into the early morning of June 29 across South Dakota and southern Minnesota. A prolific supercell produced a few tornadoes across Deuel County, South Dakota, before moving into Yellow Medicine County, Minnesota and dissipating. The first tornado of the storm, rated at mid-range EF2, touched down southwest of Altamont. A silo and shed were destroyed, while a farmhouse was shifted off its foundation.

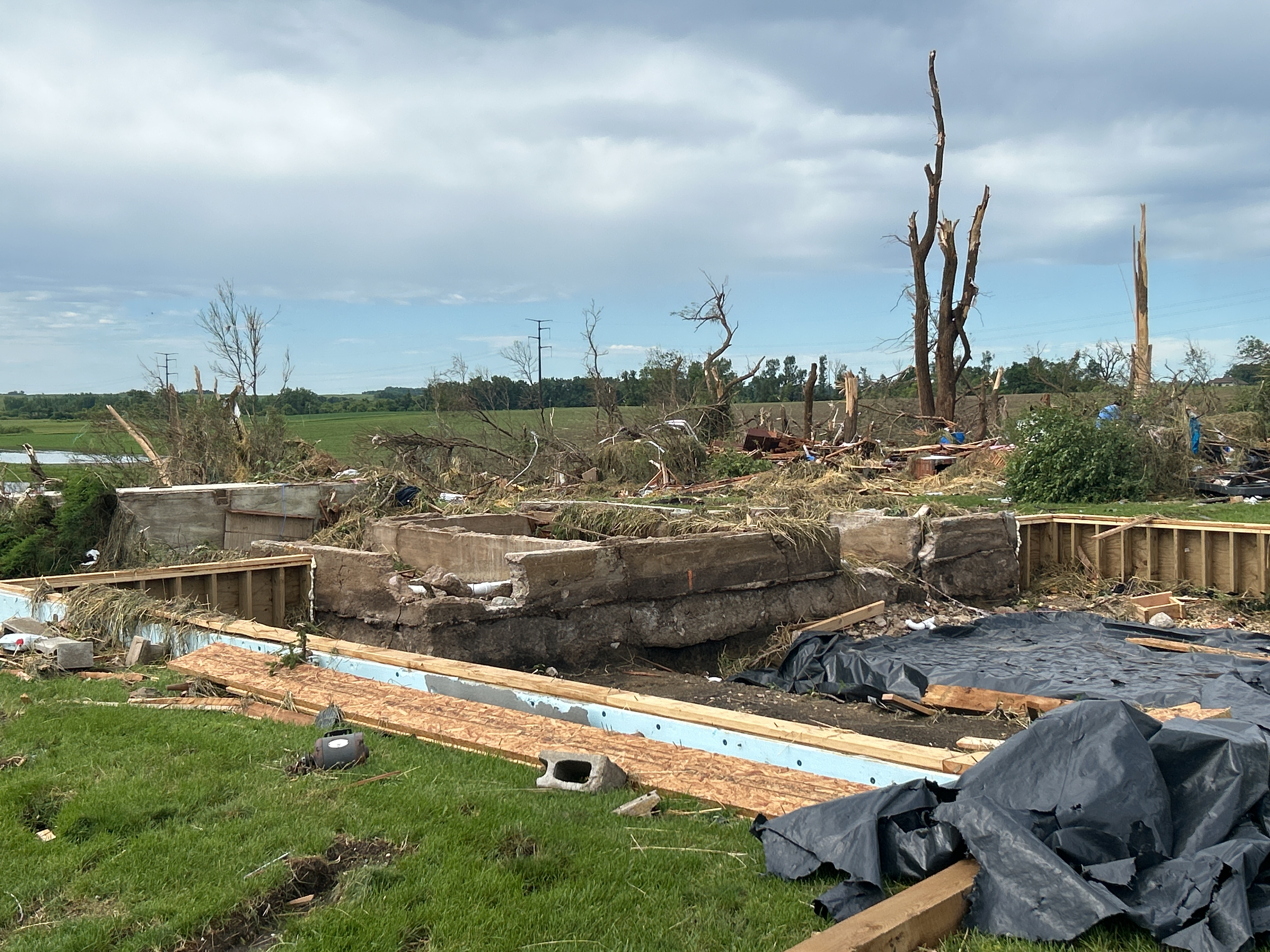
A two-story farmhouse was swept off its foundation near Gary, South Dakota.

After the EF2 tornado dissipated, the parent storm would begin its cycling process, and later produced a high-end EF3 tornado east of Clear Lake. This tornado exhibited multiple vortex breakdowns, crossed SD 22 in a narrow “drill bit” formation, and impacted a farmstead at high-end EF3 intensity. A two-story residence was completely swept away, several vehicles and farming equipment were thrown and were majorly mangled, trees were debarked, and several outbuildings and silos were destroyed. Two people were injured before the tornado dissipated southwest of Gary. A large, and rainwrapped EF2 tornado struck a ranch and injured two people just after touch down in rural Jackson County, South Dakota, south of Kadoka. During the early morning hours of June 29, several QLCS tornadoes were reported in the suburbs of Minneapolis, Minnesota.

== July ==
=== July 2 (China) ===
A tornado rated at least EF2 struck industrial areas of Cangzhou, China. Multiple factories and other buildings were levelled and vehicles were thrown long distances. Two fatalities and multiple injuries were reported.

=== July 3 (Finland) ===
An IF2-rated tornado formed in Parkano, Finland during Storm Ulla. It toppled around 4 hectares of forest in the area. The tornado was seen from a weather radar from the nearby town of Kankaanpää for about 20 minutes. No casualties were reported.

=== July 7 (Europe) ===
IFU	IF0	IF0.5	IF1	IF1.5	IF2	IF2.5	IF3	IF4	IF5
2	0	0	1	1	2	0	0	0	0

A scattered day of severe storms across Central Europe spawned a few tornadoes. A waterspout made landfall and caused no damage north of Trieste in Northeast Italy. A strong IF2 tornado struck the community of Marcellano, just west of Bastardo in Central Italy, downing and debranching numerous olive trees. At least one of the olive trees was lofted a few meters from where it stood. Buildings had their roofs and canopies damaged, power lines were tilted, light objects were tossed varying distances and fields were scoured. An IF1.5 tornado impacted Cigliano in Piedmont, Italy, causing a partial wall collapse of an auto repair shop and damaged to the roofs of other buildings in town. In Germany, an IF1 tornado moved through southern Berga, damaging several roofs and tossing debris, which injured one person. Finally, an IF2 tornado moved through forested areas near Beloveža, Slovakia, snapping or uprooting hundreds of trees. In all, six tornadoes occurred.

=== July 9 (Belarus) ===
A strong IF2 tornado moved through the small village of Varkhi in Northern Belarus, damaging 27 residential buildings and 2 businesses. The E95 highway was blocked by trees that were downed from the tornado. Another brief tornado was documented of Ushachy but no damage was noted.

=== July 12 (Utah) ===
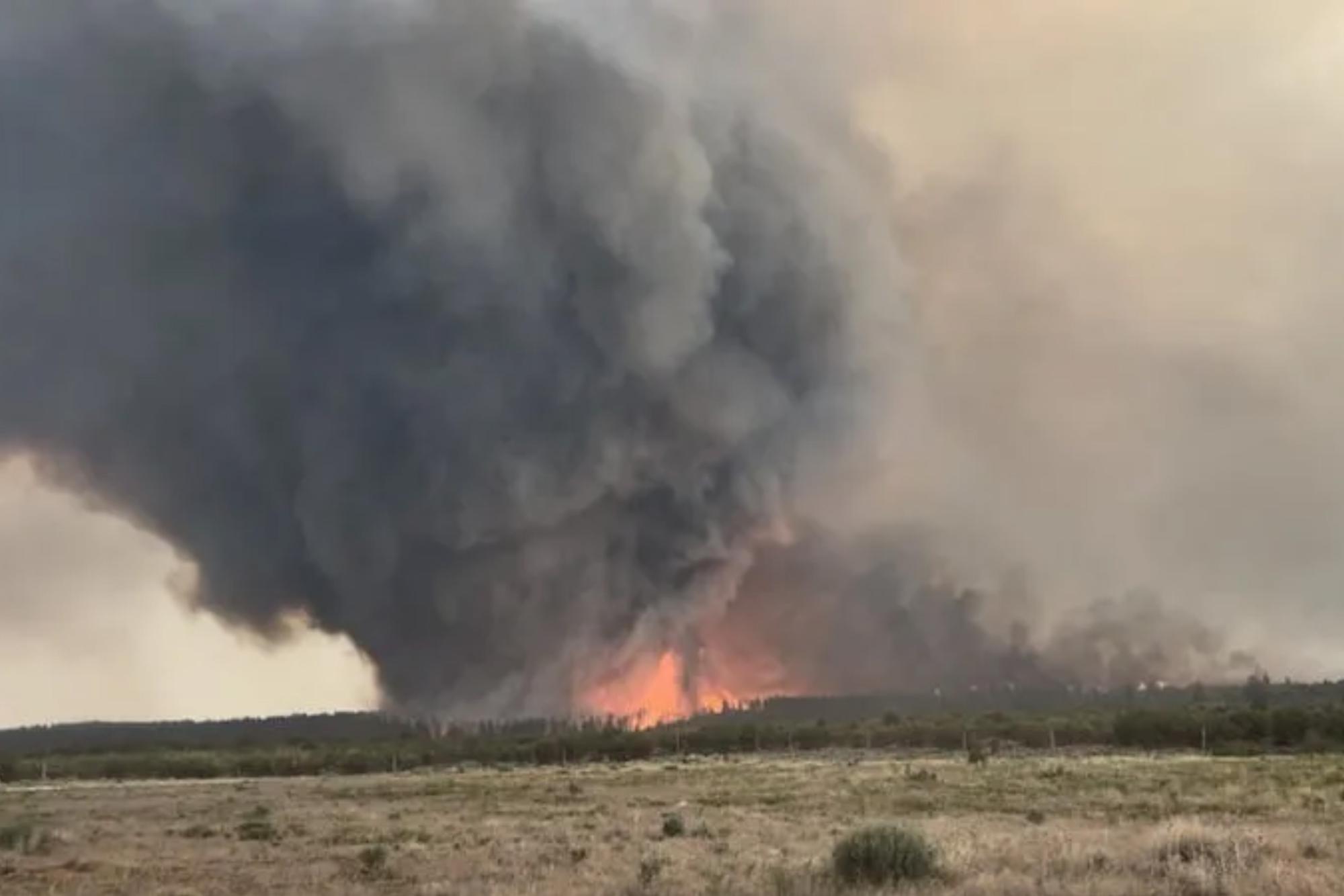
Image of the tornado as it was forming.

In the afternoon hours of July 12, 2025, a rare and significant fire tornado occurred in the La Sal mountain range near the small town of La Sal in the U.S. state of Utah. The tornado formed as part of the Deer Creek Fire, a fast moving and destructive wildfire that formed 2 days earlier. The tornado was approximately on the ground for 12 minutes and was nearly stationary as it moved north east.

Strong winds influenced the formation of the fire tornado over the Deer Creek Fire. Strong wind gusts coming off the La Sal mountain range, flowing over the mountains like a river over rocks. The mountains disrupted the wind, creating a body of swirling air, spinning flames into the mostly stationary fire tornado. Rugged terrain and limited road access complicated fire suppression efforts. Due to damage found at a single family home, the tornado was rated EF2 on the Enhanced Fujita scale.

=== July 15 (Austria) ===
An IF2 tornado struck Taufkirchen an der Pram in Northwestern Austria, tearing photovoltaic panels off of roofs of buildings and tossing them considerable distances. Roof tiles, tree branches and other light objects were also tossed around. A shipping container was tossed onto a car as well. No injuries or fatalities occurred.

=== July 23 (Australia) ===
On the evening of July 23, a rare tornado struck the coastal suburb of City Beach in Perth, in the state of Western Australia. The tornado developed from a severe thunderstorm that rapidly intensified as it moved ashore, likely originating as a waterspout over the Indian Ocean before making landfall. The rotating storm produced strong, concentrated winds that damaged homes and infrastructure across the western suburbs. Multiple residences in City Beach and surrounding areas experienced significant roof damage, with sections of roofing removed and trees uprooted or snapped by the intense winds. Residents reported debris strewn across roads and gardens, and emergency services responded to dozens of calls for assistance as power outages and fallen trees disrupted daily life. Local meteorologists and witnesses described the storm's sudden onset, noting that the rapid development of the convective cell provided little warning before the tornado struck. The Bureau of Meteorology confirmed that the severe cell responsible for the damage exhibited characteristics consistent with tornadic activity. No fatalities were reported, though several households were left uninhabitable and repairs continued in the days following the storm.

== August ==
=== August 3 (Russia) ===
On August 3, a damaging tornado struck a rural area of the Jewish Autonomous Oblast in Russia's Far East, producing localized but significant infrastructure damage. The tornado snapped and uprooted trees and caused structural impacts to utility infrastructure, including the bending and partial collapse of several high-voltage power transmission towers, resulting in temporary power disruptions to nearby communities. Light structural and agricultural damage was also reported along the tornado's path. Damage surveys and photographic evidence indicated wind intensities consistent with an IF2 rating, making it the strongest documented tornado to occur in the Jewish Autonomous Oblast. No fatalities were reported, though emergency crews were dispatched to repair damaged power lines and clear debris following the storm.

=== August 25–26 (Typhoon Kajiki) ===
Two days of tornadic unrest began late in the evening on August 25, as Typhoon Kajiki made landfall in Vietnam. A powerful tornado struck Kim Bảng district in Ninh Bình. The tornado, though lasting only a few minutes, caused extensive damage to more than 200 homes and businesses. One 88-year-old woman was killed after a wall collapsed onto her, and 14 others were hospitalized with injuries. The following day, four additional tornadoes were reported across northern Vietnam. In total, the two-day outbreak resulted in at least one fatality and 14 reported injuries.

=== August 28–29 (Europe) ===
IFU	IF0	IF0.5	IF1	IF1.5	IF2	IF2.5	IF3	IF4	IF5
4	0	2	4	3	0	0	0	0	0

The remnants of Hurricane Erin established a strong upper-level trough over Western Europe, which, along with high instability and wind shear, created a volatile environment for storm development. The primary risk of these severe storms were extreme wind and rainfall, although some tornadoes were also predicted, particularly across France and Northern Italy. August 28 primarily featured strong wind events, with up to IF2-strength winds affecting parts of Northern Italy, although one rain-wrapped tornado caused minor damage in Somaglia.

The next day, on August 29, several tornadoes occurred across Europe. In France, multiple supercell thunderstorms produced several tornadoes across the southwest and central regions. The strongest tornadoes were rated IF1–IF1.5, including events near Bias, Saint-Rabier, and Martel, where dozens of homes and businesses sustained roof damage, mobile homes were overturned, trees were snapped or uprooted, and residents were temporarily displaced. Around 30 houses were damaged in Saint-Rabier alone, and at least one person was slightly injured. Additional weaker tornadoes affected areas near Bergerac, Marçay, Boisseuil-Saint-Hilaire-Bonneval, and La Chapelle-sur-Aveyron, producing scattered roof and tree damage. The events were documented and surveyed by KERAUNOS, which confirmed multiple tornadic tracks across the affected departments.

Two tornadoes occurred in Italy on the 29th and impacted Verderio Superiore, where roof tiles were blown off homes and trees were uprooted, and Goito, where trees and a power line were damaged. Farther east in Poland, brief tornadoes were observed near Śrem and Gniezno. The stronger of the two, near Gniezno, reached IF1.5 intensity, overturning vehicles, damaging trees, and injuring at least one person when a tree fell onto a car.

=== August 30 (Colombia) ===
An F1 tornado struck the town of Soledad in the Atlántico Department of northern Colombia, producing widespread structural damage across multiple neighborhoods. According to local authorities and municipal reports, the tornado uprooted trees, damaged roofs, and caused significant structural impacts to over 700 homes in at least ten districts, including Los Robles, Los Almendros, Ciudadela Metropolitana, and Altos del Metro. Emergency response teams, including the Office of Risk and Disaster Management and the fire department, were deployed to assist affected residents, and the mayor declared a state of public calamity to coordinate humanitarian aid and recovery efforts. Eleven people were treated for injuries at local hospitals, most of which were minor.

=== August 30 (Vietnam) ===
Severe thunderstorms associated with a broader monsoonal disturbance produced a large tornado in Ba Vì district, impacting Vật Lại Commune and nearby rural communities west of Hanoi. The tornado damaged or destroyed numerous homes, tore roofs from light structures, and uprooted trees along a narrow path through residential and agricultural areas. Several outbuildings and farm structures collapsed, and debris was scattered across roads and fields. Local authorities reported that dozens of houses sustained damage and multiple families were temporarily displaced while emergency crews conducted damage assessments and assisted residents with cleanup and temporary shelter. No fatalities were reported.

== September ==
=== September 2 (France) ===
Severe thunderstorms moving across Brittany during the afternoon of September 2 produced two tornadoes, including a significant long-track tornado that caused injuries and structural damage across several rural communes. The first tornado was an IF1 tornado near Landévant, which produced scattered tree damage along a short path. Several roofs, gates, and light structures were damaged, and large branches were broken or thrown. A short bit later, a strong, multi-vortex IF2 tornado struck near Guéhenno, where a narrow but intense damage swath extended nearly 20 km (12 mi) through wooded and residential areas. Approximately ten homes were damaged, trees were snapped or uprooted, and debris was thrown hundreds of meters. Several mobile homes were overturned or displaced, with two occupants reportedly thrown from their shelter into a nearby field. Four people sustained minor injuries.

=== September 5 (Japan) ===
EFU	EF0	EF1	EF2	EF3	EF4	EF5
0	0	4	2	1	0	0

A rare and destructive JEF3 tornado, spawned from the outer bands of Tropical Storm Peipah, struck the city of Makinohara and neighboring town of Yoshida, both located within Shizuoka Prefecture. According to the Japan Meteorological Agency, the tornado had estimated winds of 270 km/h (170 mph), making the tornado one of the strongest in Japan on record. Makinohara was hit the hardest, with one fully destroyed structure and nearly two thousand damaged. In total, 83 people were injured, and one man in Yoshida was killed by the tornado as it overturned his car. Another tornado, rated JEF2, affected the city of Kakegawa in the same prefecture.

=== September 13–14 (United States) ===
EFU	EF0	EF1	EF2	EF3	EF4	EF5
19	0	3	3	0	0	0

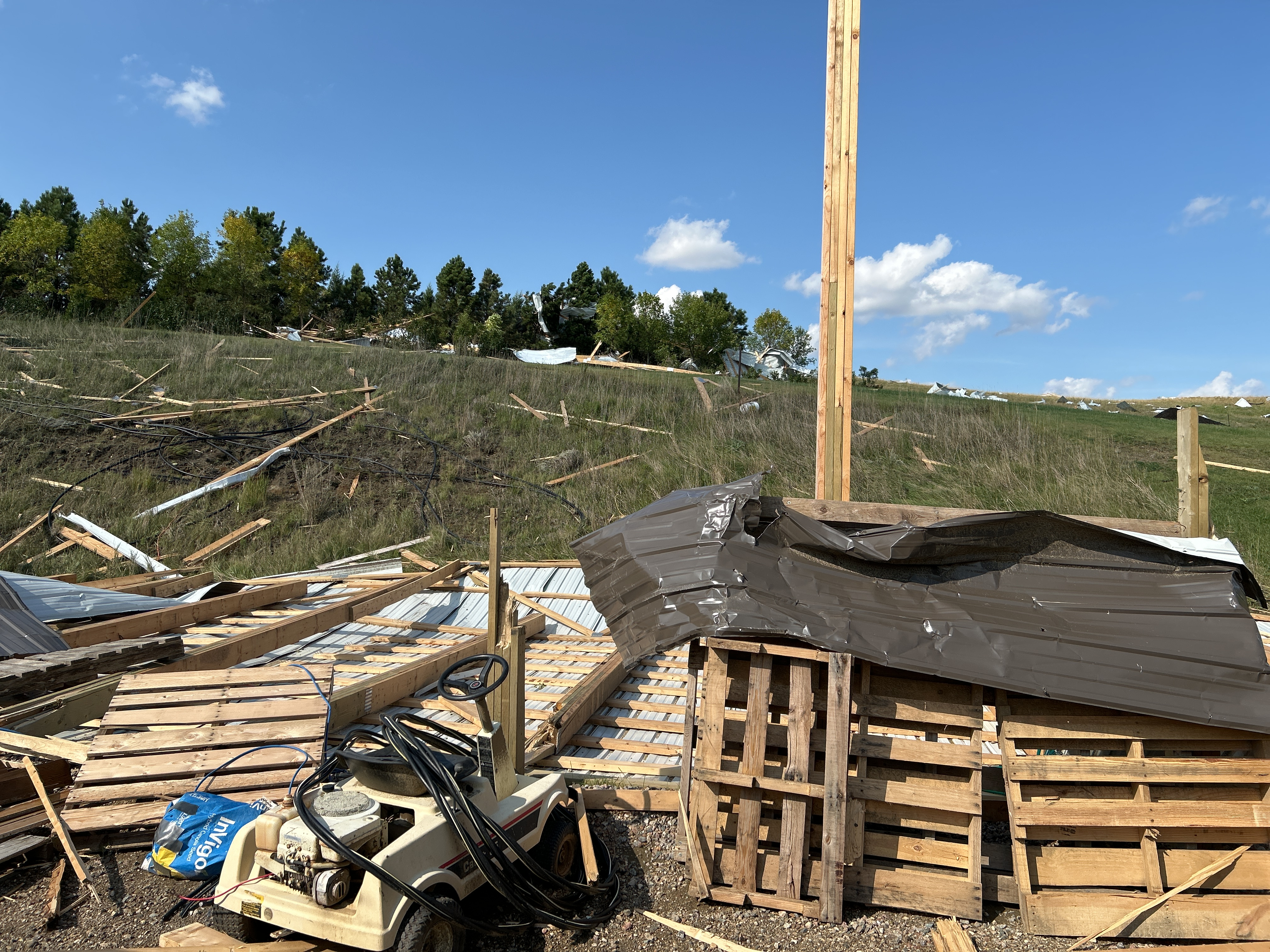
A large barn completely destroyed at EF2 intensity.

Two days of elevated tornado activity started on September 13 when a rare EF2 tornado occurred in San Juan County, Utah. The tornado tracked through the Navajo Nation and caused significant damage to homes, vehicles and farm equipment. The following day on September 14, a localized tornado outbreak occurred in the Dakotas, mostly within North Dakota. Several tornadoes touched down, most remaining over rural land and causing no damage but two strong tornadoes did occur. The first EF2 tornado occurred southeast of Cannon Ball, North Dakota, damaging farming equipment, outbuildings, trees and crops. The other significant EF2 tornado that day was a wedge tornado that tracked near Denhoff, North Dakota where it destroyed a pole barn, damaged multiple buildings and mobile homes, displaced vehicles and hay bales, and caused widespread tree and farm outbuilding damage. Across the 2 days, 25 total tornadoes occurred, 20 of which occurred in North Dakota alone. The storms also produced flooding in North Dakota, with 2.44 in (62 mm) recorded in Bismarck. Total damage from the outbreak reached $1.53 million.

=== September 14 (Philippines) ===
IFU	IF0	IF0.5	IF1	IF1.5	IF2	IF2.5	IF3	IF4	IF5
0	2	0	2	0	0	1	0	0	0

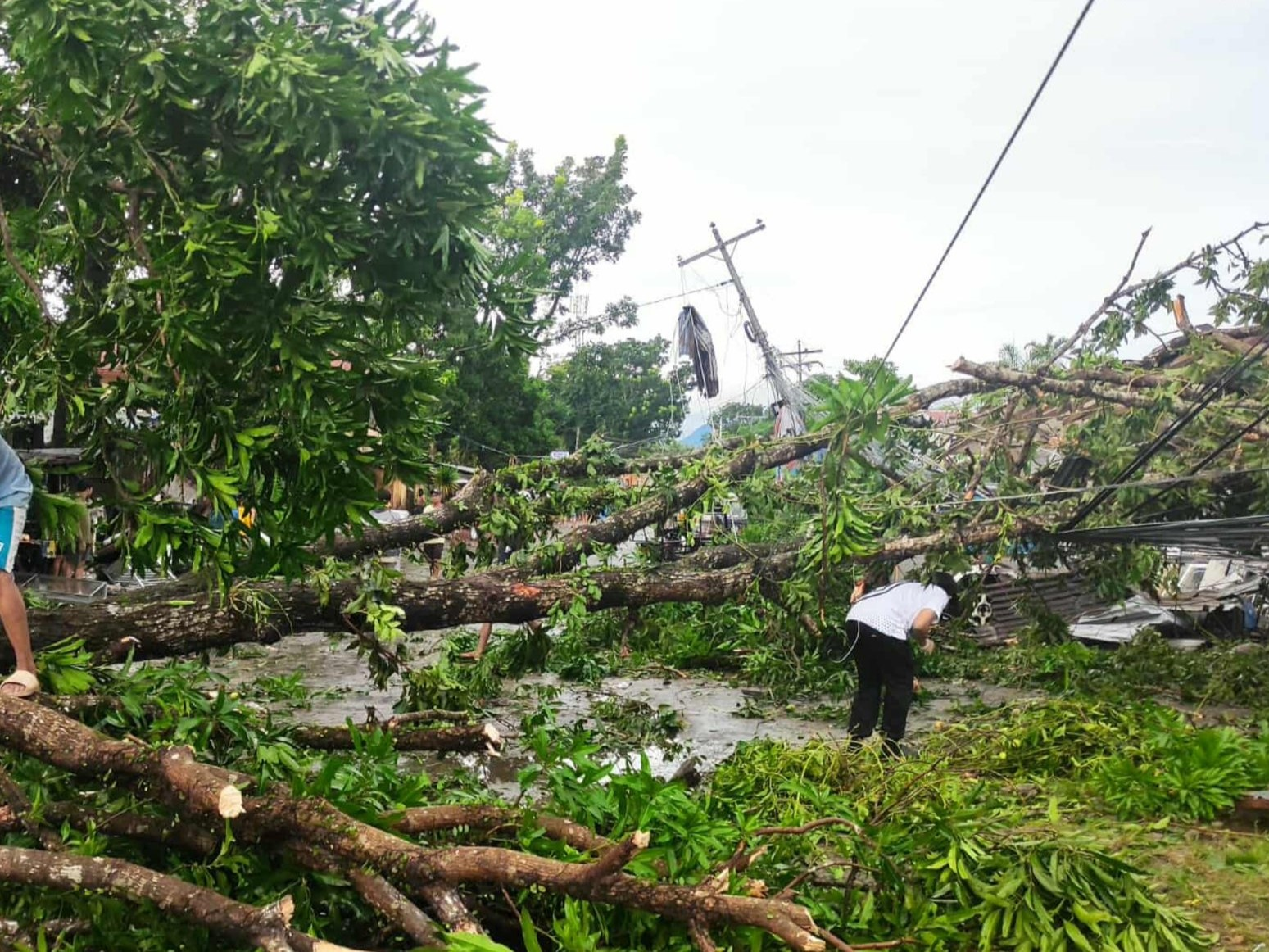
Low-end EF3 tree damage caused by a tornado in Daet, Camarines Norte on September 14, 2025

On the morning of September 14, around 6:00 a.m. local time, an IF2.5 tornado struck the town of Daet in Camarines Norte, causing widespread wind damage amid a convective thunderstorm environment. The tornado uprooted trees, damaged homes and other structures as it passed through the community. In Barangay Magang (Fairview 2), a falling tree struck two people, killing both victims, including a woman and her 13-year-old niece, and at least two others were reported injured in nearby areas where houses were destroyed or damaged. It had wind speeds of 137 mph (220 km/h) and travelled for about 2 km (1.24 mi) before dissipating. Local authorities reported that 103 families were affected by the storm, with emergency crews and disaster response teams assessing damage and assisting displaced residents in the aftermath.

=== September 20–22 (South America) ===
FU	F0	F1	F2	F3	F4	F5
3	3	1	1	0	0	0

A wave of strong storms, fueled by a powerful low-level jet situated over Southeastern Brazil, spawned several tornadoes across Argentina, Paraguay, Chile, and Brazil. On September 20, a landspout tornado was filmed over open land in San Luis Province, Argentina, causing no damage. Wind speeds were estimated at 70 km/h (43 mph), or F0 intensity. Another EF0 tornado touched down in Linares, Chile, where over 150 homes were damaged, additionally uprooting trees and downing power lines. Another tornado, preliminarily rated F0, affected San Pedro de la Paz. The next day, a strong tornado struck the city of Concepción, Paraguay, where hundreds of homes were damaged, including about 50 that were partially or completely destroyed. Several tornadoes touched down across Brazil on September 22. An F1 tornado struck Santa Maria do Oeste, damaging crops and houses. Another tornado struck Reserva, destroying greenhouses and snapping or uprooting trees. Barra Bonita was also struck by a strong tornado that damaged about 40 houses, including one wooden house that was lifted on top of a car. Another strong tornado struck Porto Feliz, where a Toyota plant suffered extensive damages, injuring 30 workers. The tornado was preliminary rated EF2+ by PREVOTS.

=== September 22–23 (Philippines and Taiwan) ===
EFU	EF0	EF1	EF2	EF3	EF4	EF5
3	0	2	1	0	0	0

Five tornadoes were spawned by Typhoon Ragasa as it made landfall in the Philippines and in Taiwan. On September 22, an EF2 tornado struck three villages in Santa Maria where it damaged 48 houses, electric poles, and some vinegar stalls. On September 23, a tornado lifted several roofs off and blew over road signs in Taitung County, Taiwan. On the same day an EF1 tornado struck Baras, Rizal. A day later, three tornadoes hit Zambales and Bulacan. At 14:00 PhST, an EF1 tornado struck Olongapo, Zambales, where it damaged 4 houses and toppled trees in the area. At around 16:00 PhST, another tornado through a public market in Masinloc, a tornado in Meycauayan, Bulacan damaged 7 houses and scattered multiple debris. One person was injured after falling from a motorcycle due to strong winds.

=== September 25–29 (Typhoon Bualoi) ===
Typhoon Bualoi spawned at least two tornadoes in Oriental Mindoro, Philippines. On September 25 a EFU Multi-vortex tornado struck two villages in Calapan. the next day a EFU tornado struck a village in Baco, where it tore off roofs of a nearby house. Then on September 28, five tornadoes would spawn in Northern Vietnam, ultimately causing 11 fatalities. A strong tornado in Ninh Bình province killed nine people and injured 18 others. Another tornado in Hưng Yên province killed two and injured nine, and a third tornado in Haiphong injured eight people. Two other tornadoes caused a total of nine injuries in Quảng Ninh and north of Hanoi. Additionally, 20 tornadoes were confirmed in Southern China, specifically the Zhanjiang area, from September 25–29. Most were rated EFU, EF0 or EF1, although one was rated EF2.

== October ==
=== October 4 (Norway) ===
A rare, strong landspout struck the village of Oppdal in Norway. The landspout was recorded as it moved through downtown Oppdal where it downed trees, overturned caravans, and smashed windows. At least 3 people were injured. This landspout was rated IF2 and information is still preliminary and subject to change.

=== October 5 (Bangladesh) ===
During the morning hours of October 5, a damaging tornado struck portions of Nilphamari District and Rangpur Division in northern Bangladesh amid heavy rainfall and convective storms. The tornado destroyed or damaged hundreds of homes across several villages, particularly within Garagram Union and parts of Gangachara Upazila. Numerous trees were uprooted, power lines were downed, and roads were obstructed by debris. At least 30 people were injured, several of whom required hospitalization. Local authorities and relief agencies conducted damage assessments and distributed emergency assistance to affected residents.

=== October 20 (Europe) ===
IFU	IF0	IF0.5	IF1	IF1.5	IF2	IF2.5	IF3	IF4	IF5
0	0	3	3	0	1	0	0	0	0

A widespread severe weather outbreak produced multiple tornadoes across western Europe on October 20, affecting the United Kingdom, France, and the Netherlands, resulting in one fatality and numerous injuries.

In the United Kingdom, a brief IF0.5 tornado struck Dereham, causing minor damage to homes and trees. The event was confirmed by TORRO, which documented light structural and roof damage along a short path. In the Netherlands, a brief IF0.5 tornado was observed near Woudsend, where part of a barn roof was damaged and tree branches were snapped.

The most significant impacts occurred in France, where several tornadoes touched down as supercell thunderstorms moved northeastward across the country. The strongest tornado struck Ermont and surrounding communities including Argenteuil, Eaubonne, and Franconville. Rated IF2, the tornado carved a damage path up to 14 km (8.7 mi) long and as wide as 600 m (660 yd), tearing roofs from buildings, collapsing three tower cranes, overturning vehicles, and scattering debris across streets. A 23-year-old worker was killed, four people were left in critical condition, and several others sustained injuries. Dozens of residents were temporarily displaced as emergency shelters were opened. Additional weaker tornadoes occurred elsewhere in France. IF1 to IF0.5 tornadoes caused roof and tree damage near Anglesqueville-la-Bras-Long, Michery, Chaumont-en-Vexin, and Chambley-Bussières, where farms, homes, and agricultural structures sustained varying degrees of damage, with sheets of metal and debris carried hundreds of meters from their points of origin.

=== October 25–27 (United States) ===
EFU	EF0	EF1	EF2	EF3	EF4	EF5
0	7	5	0	0	0	0

A small QLCS tornado event occurred mainly along the Gulf Coast of the Southern United States from October 25–27. A total of ten tornadoes were confirmed, including two waterspouts that came ashore in Mexico Beach, Florida, one of which damaged or rolled over several RVs, resulting in 10 injuries. In addition, a rare EF0 rated landspout touched down north of Rigby, Idaho.

=== October 27–28 (Turkey) ===
IFU	IF0	IF0.5	IF1	IF1.5	IF2	IF2.5	IF3	IF4	IF5
0	0	0	1	2	2	0	0	0	0

A series of tornadoes associated with severe thunderstorms swept across northwestern Turkey, impacting several rural communities and causing structural damage and one fatality across two days. On October 27, an IF1 tornado struck Enez and an IF1.5 occurred in the area of Eşeler village, where roofs were partially removed from homes and telegraph and light poles were damaged or knocked down. More significant damage occurred on October 28 as stronger tornadoes tracked across villages in Ankara Province, including an IF2 impacting Çantırlı, an IF1.5 striking Dibecik, and a strong IF2 affecting İlhanköy. Entire roofs were lifted and thrown from residences, garden structures and fences were destroyed, and several mosque towers sustained heavy damage, with at least one partially collapsing. In İlhanköy, a 40-year-old man was killed after being struck by debris from an overturned container, while three children sheltering inside were injured. Emergency crews responded across the region to clear debris, assess damage, and assist displaced residents.

=== October 29 (Spain) ===
On the morning of October 29, a vigorous storm system producing torrential rain and severe thunderstorms affected parts of Andalusia, including the coastal province of Huelva. In Gibraleón, a strong tornado struck the town, toppling trees and damaging roofs and structures amid heavy winds. The State Meteorological Agency (AEMET) later confirmed that the circulation responsible for the damage reached wind speeds of up to 220 km/h (140 mph), consistent with an IF2 tornado. A 59-year-old man in Gibraleón was seriously injured by a falling structure during the event and died two days later from his injuries. Around the same time, a waterspout came ashore in the Isla Cristina area of the Huelva coast, where it caused additional damage to trees, roofs, and other light structures amid the broader storm impacts. This tornado was rated IF1. Although no serious injuries were reported from the Isla Cristina event, emergency services responded to numerous incidents across the region as heavy rain and strong winds produced flooding, fallen trees, and infrastructure disruptions.

== November ==
=== November 6 (Typhoon Kalmaegi) ===
Outer rainbands from Typhoon Kalmaegi produced a tornado that struck Long Phung, Quảng Ngãi, in Vietnam, causing localized but significant damage to residential areas. Numerous homes sustained roof loss or structural damage, with several light structures and outbuildings destroyed. Trees and power poles were snapped or uprooted, blocking roads and disrupting electrical service to surrounding neighborhoods. Multiple residents were injured by flying debris and collapsing materials, and several families were temporarily displaced as local authorities conducted damage assessments and cleared debris. Emergency crews and provincial officials provided assistance and began repairs shortly after the storm passed.

=== November 7 (Brazil) ===
FU	F0	F1	F2	F3	F4	F5
1	0	6	1	0	2	0

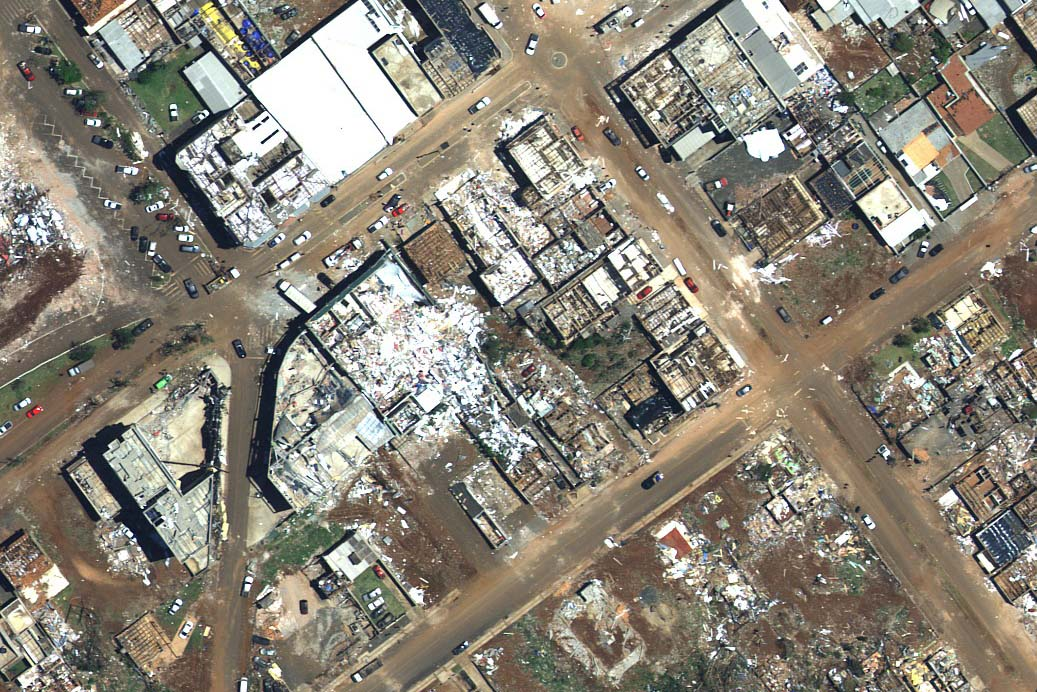
Damage from Rio Bonito do Iguaçu tornado seen from satellite.

A small but significant outbreak of tornadoes caused widespread damage within Southern Brazil, including a violent tornado that devastated the town of Rio Bonito do Iguaçu, where an estimated 90% of the town's structures were damaged or destroyed. At least five fatalities and upwards of 780 injuries have been reported in the city; hospitals are reportedly inundated with casualties. Experts from PREVOTS, MetSul Meteorologia and SIMEPAR rated this tornado an F4. The event has been called "unprecedented," with the governor of Paraná adding that the tornado was the strongest to hit the state in decades. At least seven other tornadoes were recorded in neighboring regions, one of which, also rated F4, killed another person in the neighboring city of Guarapuava. Another death was recorded in the municipality of Rolante, Rio Grande do Sul after a man was struck by a falling tree as a result of non-tornadic winds from the extratropical cyclone that produced these storms. The tornado outbreak was the first recorded instance of multiple violent tornadoes in South America on a single day since 2009.

=== November 15 (Portugal and Italy) ===
IFU	IF0	IF0.5	IF1	IF1.5	IF2	IF2.5	IF3	IF4	IF5
2	1	2	1	1	2	0	0	0	0

A damaging tornado struck the Albufeira area of Algarve, Portugal on November 15, impacting the Eden Resort campsite and nearby neighborhoods. Numerous mobile homes and light structures were overturned or destroyed, and many trees were snapped or uprooted. An 85-year-old British woman was killed, and 28 people were injured, including two seriously. The tornado was assigned a preliminary IF2 rating based on the extent of structural and tree damage. A second tornado touched down near Lagoa, where trees and trailers were damaged along a northeastward track. The circulation originated as a waterspout before moving inland and continued through rural areas toward Aivados, Poço Deão, and Ribeira. Damage surveys indicated major branch loss and structural impacts consistent with a preliminary IF2 intensity. Together, the two tornadoes represented one of the most significant late-season severe weather events in southern Portugal in recent years.

The same storm system produced multiple tornadoes and waterspouts across coastal Liguria in Italy, particularly around the Genoa metropolitan area. The strongest tornado, rated IF1.5, struck Pegli, where trees and large branches were downed, roofs and windows were damaged, light objects were lofted or displaced, a small boat was moved, and a truck was overturned. Additional weaker tornadoes affected nearby communities. Containers were tipped over in Prà, light roof and tree damage occurred in Sestri Ponente and Quarto dei Mille, and several brief waterspouts or weak tornadoes were documented near Crevari, Albaro, and Bogliasco, producing little to minor damage. No casualties were reported in Italy.

=== November 16–17 (Vietnam) ===
Two tornadoes were reported from November 16 to 17 in the south-central coast of Vietnam. The first was a short-lived but destructive tornado that impacted Phú Ninh District, south of Da Nang city, injuring four people. The tornado damaged around 56 structures, including 27 homes with torn roofs and three houses being destroyed. A second tornado occurred a few hours later on November 17 in Nguyễn Nghiêm, Quảng Ngãi, damaging at least 20 homes.

=== November 25 (Philippines) ===
Two tornadoes were spawned by Typhoon Koto (Verbena). In Labangan, Zamboanga del Sur an EF1 tornado struck a village where at least 2 houses were damaged. In Nabas and Tangalan, Aklan, an EF2 tornado tore off roofs of multiple houses, and snapped trees.

== December ==
=== December 8 (Brazil) ===
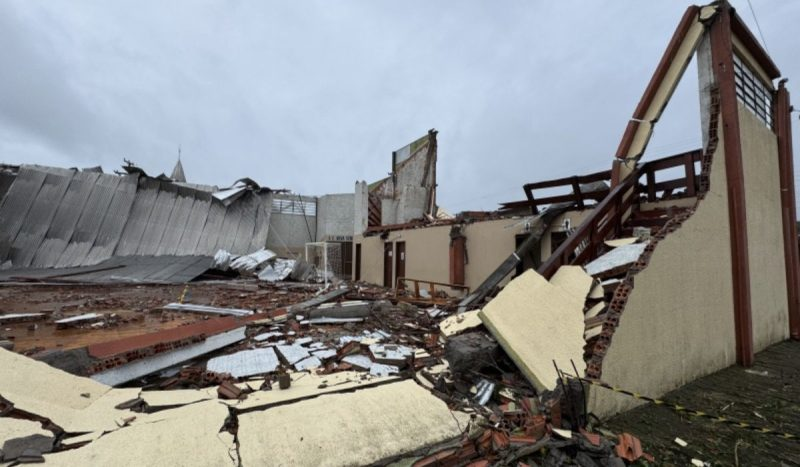
A sports gymnasium partially destroyed by the tornado.

On December 8, a significant tornado struck the municipality of Flores da Cunha in the state of Rio Grande do Sul, Brazil, causing extensive structural damage in the rural community of Alfredo Chaves. The tornado tore roofs off dozens of homes, damaged public buildings including a school and a health unit, and uprooted trees, leaving many residents’ houses exposed to the elements. Aerial and field assessments by local civil defense authorities identified damage patterns consistent with tornadic winds exceeding 100 km/h (62 mph), and between 40 and 80 homes were reported damaged, with agricultural areas such as vineyards also affected. Power outages left approximately 1,000 customers without electricity, and municipal emergency teams, supported by state defense forces and volunteer firefighters, conducted debris removal and structural safety inspections. No fatalities or serious injuries were reported, though hundreds of residents were affected by the storm's impacts. PREVOTS rated the tornado F2 while MetSul Meteorologia gave it a high-end F1 to low-end F2 estimate.

=== December 28 (United States) ===
EFU	EF0	EF1	EF2	EF3	EF4	EF5
1	5	6	1	0	0	0

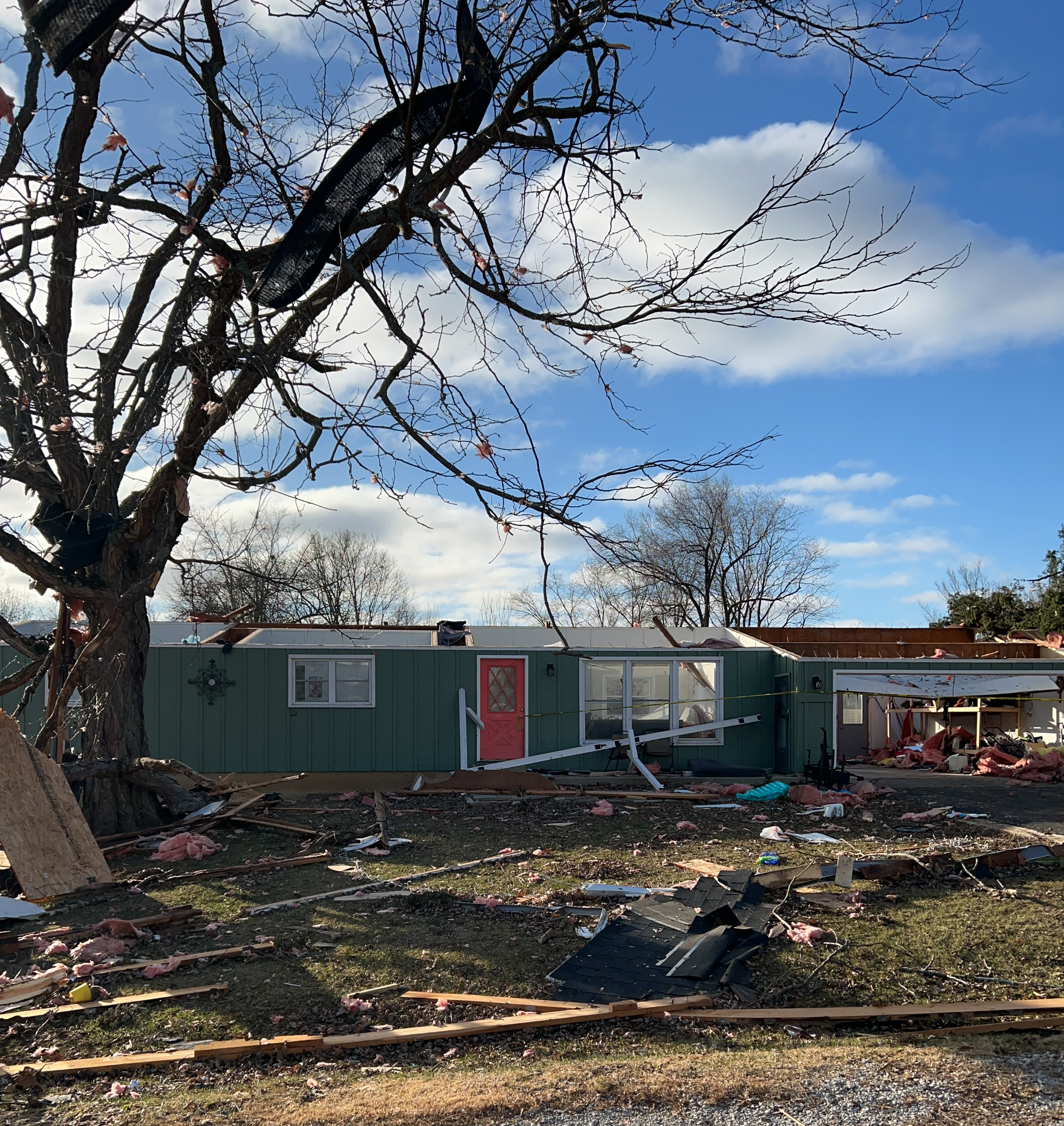
EF2 damage to a house in Mount Zion, Illinois.

A tornado outbreak affected Illinois and Indiana. An isolated EF1 tornado destroyed two barns south of Groveland, Illinois in the morning. Later that afternoon and evening, a QLCS with some supercells moved across the region and produced at least twelve more confirmed tornadoes. A long-tracked low-end EF2 tornado unroofed two houses and destroyed garages in Mount Zion, Illinois, with damage to several other homes. Twin tornadoes, rated EF0 and EF1, occurred to the east of Clifton, Illinois, causing minor damage to a few residences and farmsteads. An EF1 tornado moved through downtown Linton, Indiana, causing roof and wall damage to several masonry buildings, and injuring one person. In all, 13 tornadoes were confirmed, resulting in one injury.

== See also ==
- Weather of 2025
- 2024–25 North American winter
- 2025–26 North American winter
- Meteorology in the 21st century
- NOAA in the second Trump administration
- List of F5, EF5, and IF5 tornadoes
