= Elizabeth Patterson =

Elizabeth Patterson may refer to:

- Elizabeth Patterson Bonaparte (1785–1879), first wife of Jérôme Bonaparte, and sister-in-law of Emperor Napoleon I of France
- Liz J. Patterson (1939–2018), U.S. Representative from South Carolina
- Elizabeth Patterson (actress) (1874–1966), American actress
- Elizabeth Gregg Patterson (1904–1987), American short story writer
- Elizabeth Patterson, a fictional character from Lynn Johnston's For Better or For Worse comic strip
- Elizabeth Patterson, mayor of Benicia, California
- Beth Patterson, Irish musician
- Elizabeth Patterson (artist) (born 1954), American artist
- Elizabeth Akua-Nyarko Patterson (born 1985), Ghanaian social entrepreneur
- Liz Patterson (high jumper), winner of the 2010 high jump at the NCAA Division I Indoor Track and Field Championships
