= New Home =

New Home may refer to:

- New Home, Georgia, an unincorporated community
- New Home, Missouri, an unincorporated community
- New Home Township, Bates County, Missouri
- New Home Township, Williams County, North Dakota, Williams County, North Dakota
- New Home, Texas, a city
  - New Home Independent School District, based in the city
- New Home School and Church, south of Bella Vista, Arkansas, on the National Register of Historic Places
- New Home School Building, Jackson County, Arkansas, on the National Register of Historic Places

== See also ==
- Newholm (disambiguation)
