= National Register of Historic Places listings in Jackson County, Arkansas =

Location of Jackson County in Arkansas

This is a list of the National Register of Historic Places listings in Jackson County, Arkansas.

This is intended to be a complete list of the properties and districts on the National Register of Historic Places in Jackson County, Arkansas, United States. The locations of National Register properties and districts for which the latitude and longitude coordinates are included below, may be seen in a map.

There are 15 properties and districts listed on the National Register in the county. Four other sites were once listed but have been removed.

Contents: Counties in Arkansas
- Arkansas
- Ashley
- Baxter
- Benton
- Boone
- Bradley
- Calhoun
- Carroll
- Chicot
- Clark
- Clay
- Cleburne
- Cleveland
- Columbia
- Conway
- Craighead
- Crawford
- Crittenden
- Cross
- Dallas
- Desha
- Drew
- Faulkner
- Franklin
- Fulton
- Garland
- Grant
- Greene
- Hempstead
- Hot Spring
- Howard
- Independence
- Izard
- Jackson
- Jefferson
- Johnson
- Lafayette
- Lawrence
- Lee
- Lincoln
- Little River
- Logan
- Lonoke
- Madison
- Marion
- Miller
- Mississippi
- Monroe
- Montgomery
- Nevada
- Newton
- Ouachita
- Perry
- Phillips
- Pike
- Poinsett
- Polk
- Pope
- Prairie
- Pulaski (Little Rock)
- Randolph
- St. Francis
- Saline
- Scott
- Searcy
- Sebastian
- Sevier
- Sharp
- Stone
- Union
- Van Buren
- Washington
- White
- Woodruff
- Yell

This National Park Service list is complete through NPS recent listings posted December 19, 2025.

== Current listings ==
| | Name on the Register | Image | Date listed | Location | City or town | Description |
|---|---|---|---|---|---|---|
| 1 | Arkansas Bank & Trust Company | Arkansas Bank & Trust Company | October 16, 1986 (#86002859) | 103 Walnut St. 35°36′21″N 91°17′00″W | Newport | |
| 2 | Empie-Van Dyke House | Empie-Van Dyke House | December 28, 1977 (#77000257) | 403 Laurel; 35°36′17″N 91°16′43″W | Newport | |
| 3 | Erwin Auxiliary Army Airfield | Erwin Auxiliary Army Airfield | October 2, 2008 (#08000954) | Northeast of the junction of Highway 14 and County Road 917; 35°34′17″N 91°15′15″W | Newport | part of the World War II Home Front Efforts in Arkansas Multiple Property Submission (MPS) |
| 4 | First Presbyterian Church | First Presbyterian Church | December 22, 1982 (#82000837) | 4th and Main Sts. 35°36′12″N 91°16′55″W | Newport | part of the Charles L. Thompson Design Collection Thematic Resource (TR) |
| 5 | Gregg House | Gregg House | December 22, 1982 (#82000838) | 412 Pine St. 35°36′36″N 91°17′04″W | Newport | part of the Charles L. Thompson Design Collection TR |
| 6 | Jackson County Courthouse | Jackson County Courthouse | November 18, 1976 (#76000421) | Arkansas Highway 367; 35°36′13″N 91°16′58″W | Newport | |
| 7 | Jackson Guards Memorial | Jackson Guards Memorial | April 26, 1996 (#96000465) | In Jacksonport State Park at the junction of Washington and Avenue Sts. 35°38′21″N 91°18′43″W | Jacksonport | part of the Civil War Commemorative Sculpture MPS |
| 8 | Jacksonport State Park | Jacksonport State Park | January 21, 1970 (#70000121) | Between Dillard St. and the White River; 35°38′19″N 91°18′19″W | Jacksonport | |
| 9 | Missouri-Pacific Depot-Newport | Missouri-Pacific Depot-Newport | June 11, 1992 (#92000619) | Northwest of the junction of Walnut and Front Sts. 35°36′23″N 91°17′00″W | Newport | part of the Historic Railroad Depots of Arkansas MPS |
| 10 | New Home School Building | | October 8, 1992 (#92001357) | County Road 69 northwest of Swifton; 35°50′38″N 91°10′24″W | Swifton | |
| 11 | Newport American Legion Community Hut | Newport American Legion Community Hut | December 10, 1992 (#92001672) | Remmel Park, north of Remmel Ave. 35°36′03″N 91°16′32″W | Newport | |
| 12 | Newport Bridge | Newport Bridge | April 9, 1990 (#90000503) | Arkansas Highway 367 over the White River; 35°36′33″N 91°17′21″W | Newport | part of the Historic Bridges of Arkansas MPS |
| 13 | Newport Junior & Senior High School | Newport Junior & Senior High School | December 22, 1982 (#82000839) | 406 Wilkerson Dr. 35°36′04″N 91°16′22″W | Newport | part of the Charles L. Thompson Design Collection TR |
| 14 | Tuckerman Water Tower | Tuckerman Water Tower | May 22, 2007 (#07000443) | Southern end of Front St. 35°43′46″N 91°12′01″W | Tuckerman | part of the New Deal Recovery Efforts in Arkansas MPS |
| 15 | Weldon Gin Company Historic District | Weldon Gin Company Historic District | June 4, 2008 (#08000487) | Northeastern corner of the junction of Washington St. and Highway 17; 35°26′50″N 91°13′49″W | Weldon | part of the Cotton and Rice Farm History and Architecture in the Arkansas Delta MPS |

== Former listings ==
| | Name on the Register | Image | Date listed | Date removed | Location | City or town | Description |
|---|---|---|---|---|---|---|---|
| 1 | Hickory Grove Church and School | | May 23, 1978 (#78000595) | July 20, 2000 | N of Jacksonport; 35°36′17″N 91°16′56″W | Jacksonport | Destroyed by fire |
| 2 | Jackson County Jail | Jackson County Jail | August 10, 1979 (#79003432) | September 20, 2006 | 503 3rd St. 35°36′17″N 91°16′56″W | Newport | Demolished in 2005 |
| 3 | Phillips 66 Station | Phillips 66 Station | June 2, 2000 (#00000605) | January 22, 2014 | Northern corner of W. 1st and Main Sts. 35°49′31″N 91°07′56″W | Swifton | part of the Arkansas Highway History and Architecture MPS. Destroyed by fire. |
| 4 | Rock Island Depot-Weldon | | June 11, 1992 (#92000621) | September 25, 2012 | Highway 17; 35°26′58″N 91°13′48″W | Weldon | part of the Historic Railroad Depots of Arkansas MPS. Demolished |

== See also ==
- List of National Historic Landmarks in Arkansas
- National Register of Historic Places listings in Arkansas
