= Jackson County Jail =

Jackson County Jail may refer to:

Places in the United States

- Jackson County Jail (Newport, Arkansas), formerly listed on the NRHP
- Jackson County Jail (Andrew, Iowa), listed on the NRHP in Jackson County, Iowa
- Jackson County Jail and Marshal's House, Independence, Missouri, NRHP-listed

Film

- Jackson County Jail (film), a 1976 film starring Yvette Mimieux and Tommy Lee Jones
