= Jackson Guards Memorial =

- U.S. National Register of Historic Places
- U.S. Historic district – Contributing property
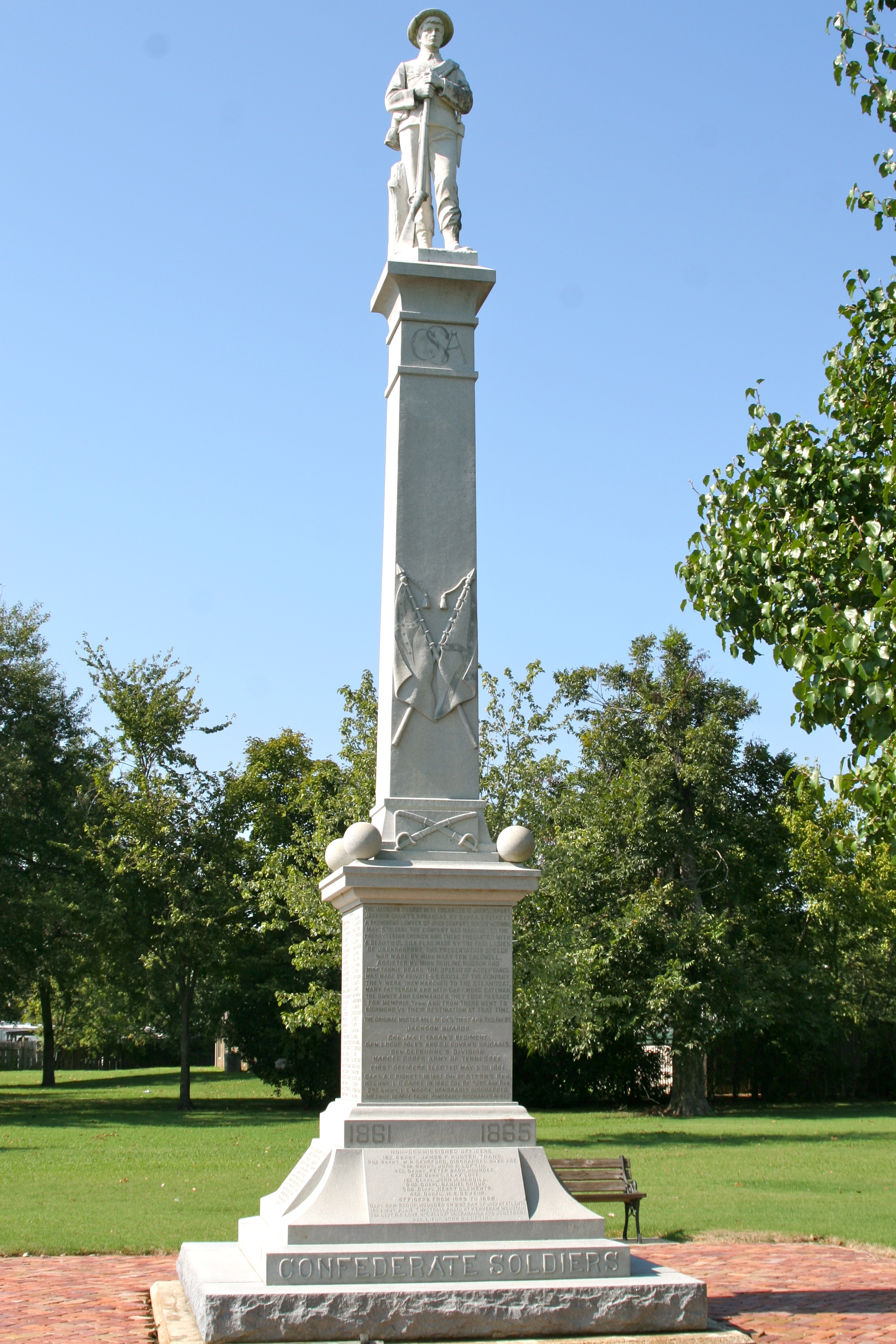

- Location within Arkansas Location within the United States
- Location: Jacksonport State Park, jct. of Washington and Avenue Sts., Jacksonport, Arkansas
- Coordinates: 35°38′21″N 91°18′43″W
- Area: less than one acre
- Built: 1914
- Architectural style: Classical Revival
- Part of: Jacksonport State Park (ID70000121)
- MPS: Civil War Commemorative Sculpture MPS
- NRHP reference No.: 96000465

Significant dates
- Added to NRHP: April 26, 1996
- Designated CP: January 21, 1970

The Jackson Guards Memorial is a sculpture commemorating the Jackson Guards, a unit of the Confederate Army, in Arkansas's Jacksonport State Park. The sculpture stands at Washington and Avenue Streets in the park, and depicts a standing male soldier, holding with both hands a rifle, butt on the ground. The marble sculpture is about 6 feet (1.8 m) tall, and is mounted on a granite base 20 feet (6.1 m) tall and 10 feet (3.0 m) square. Funding for the statue was raised by private subscription, and it was unveiled in 1914 in Newport, the county seat of Jackson County. It was moved to its present location in 1965.

In 2017, the memorial was moved 300 feet east in preparation of construction of a new visitors center.

The monument was listed on the National Register of Historic Places in 1996.

== See also ==
- National Register of Historic Places listings in Jackson County, Arkansas
