= Weldon Gin Company Historic District =

Historic district in Arkansas, United States

- U.S. National Register of Historic Places
- U.S. Historic district
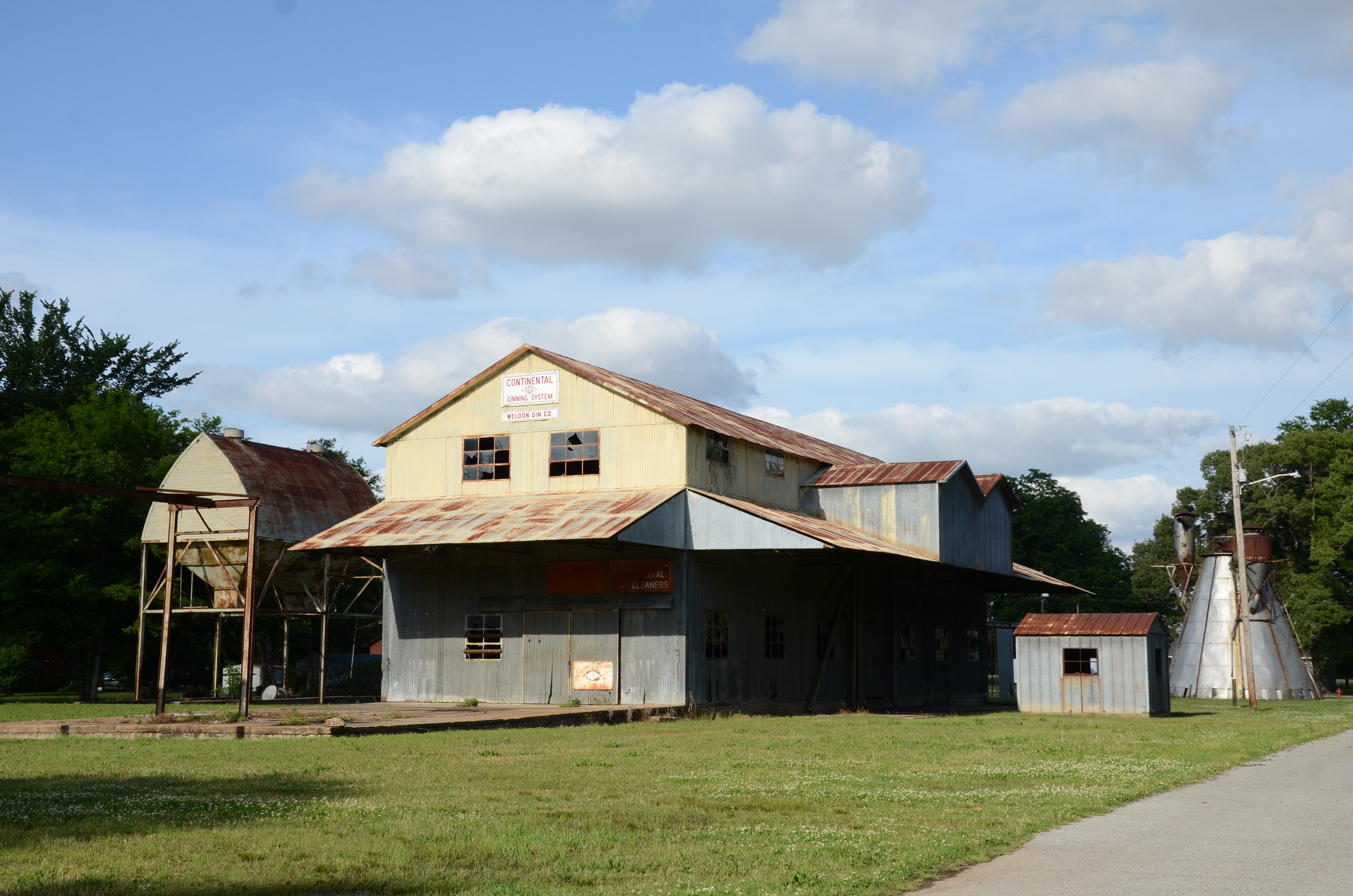

- Location within Arkansas Location within the United States
- Location: NE corner of jct. of Washington St. & AR 17, Weldon, Arkansas
- Coordinates: 35°26′57″N 91°13′47″W
- Area: 1.8 acres (0.73 ha)
- Built by: Continental Gin Company
- MPS: Cotton and Rice Farm History and Architecture in the Arkansas Delta MPS
- NRHP reference No.: 08000487
- Added to NRHP: June 4, 2008

The Weldon Gin Company Historic District encompasses a historic cotton gin complex in Weldon, Arkansas. With a history dating to 1833, the Weldon Gin Company was long a staple of the local economy. Located in the center of the town at the junction of Weldon and Washington Streets, the company complex includes a main gin building, built in 1939, and four outbuildings. The present mill was built to replace an earlier steam-powered mill after electricity was introduced to the area in the 1930s.

The complex was listed on the National Register of Historic Places in 2008.

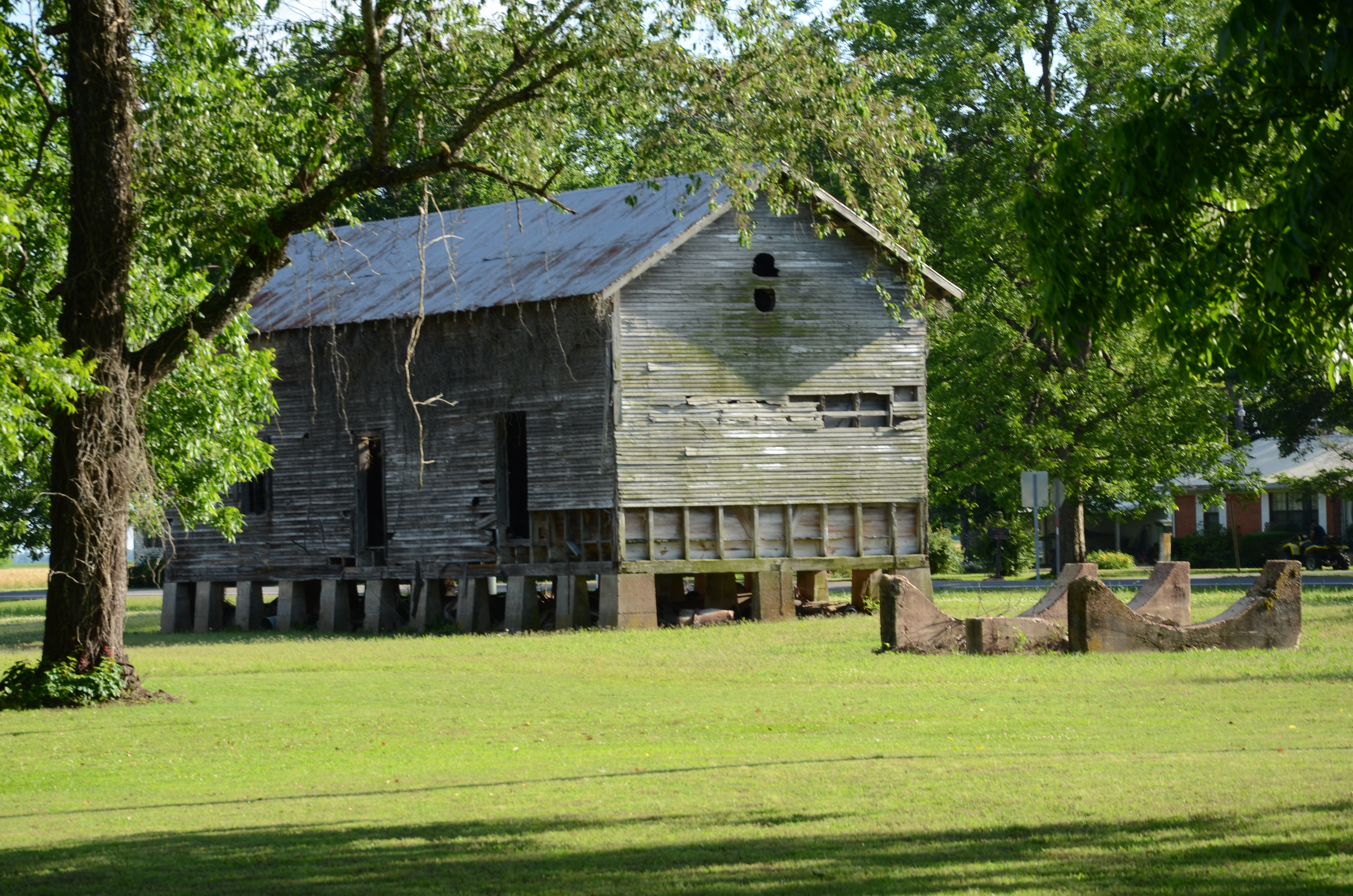
2016

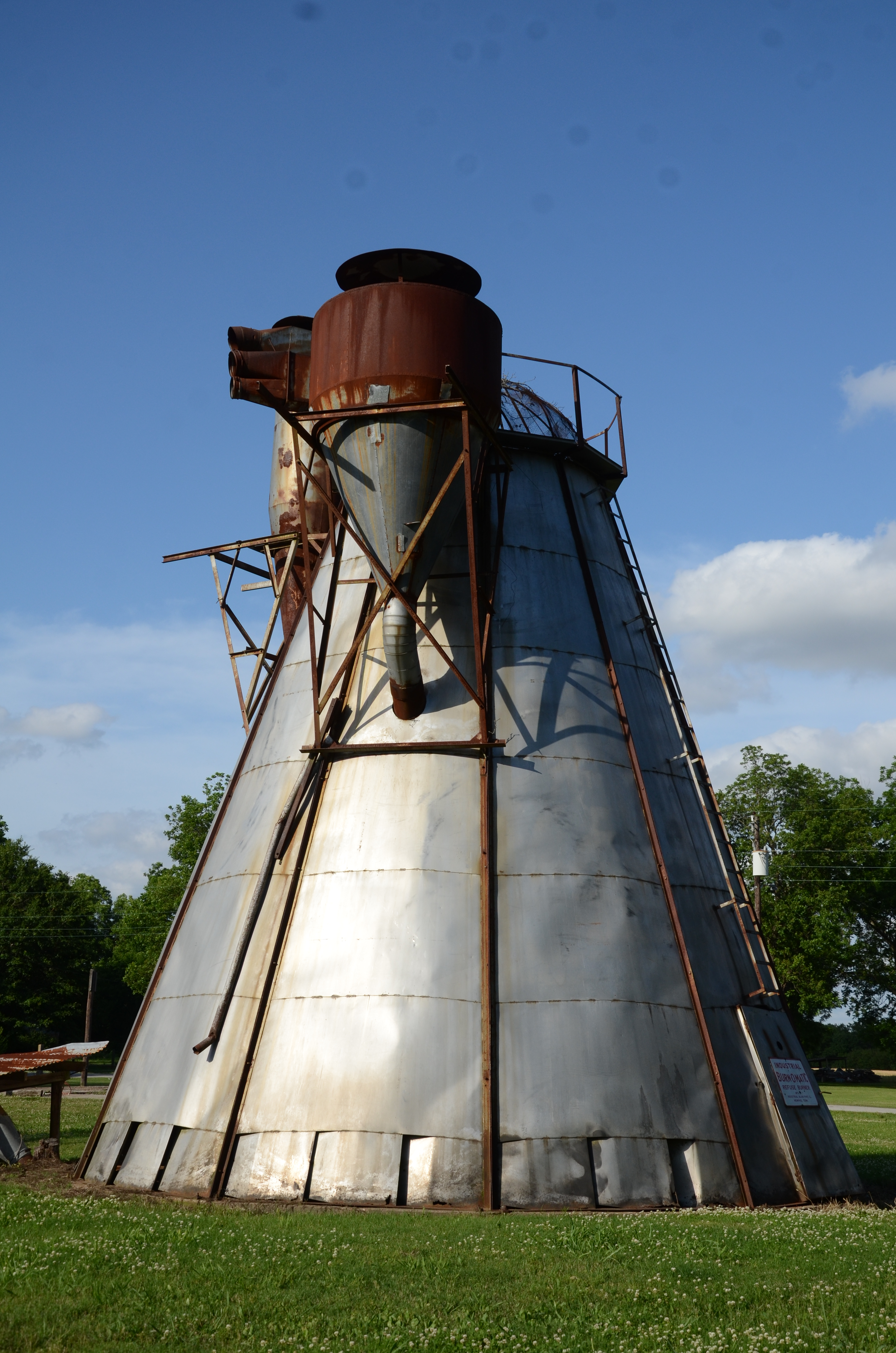
Historical Weldon Gin Co. 2016

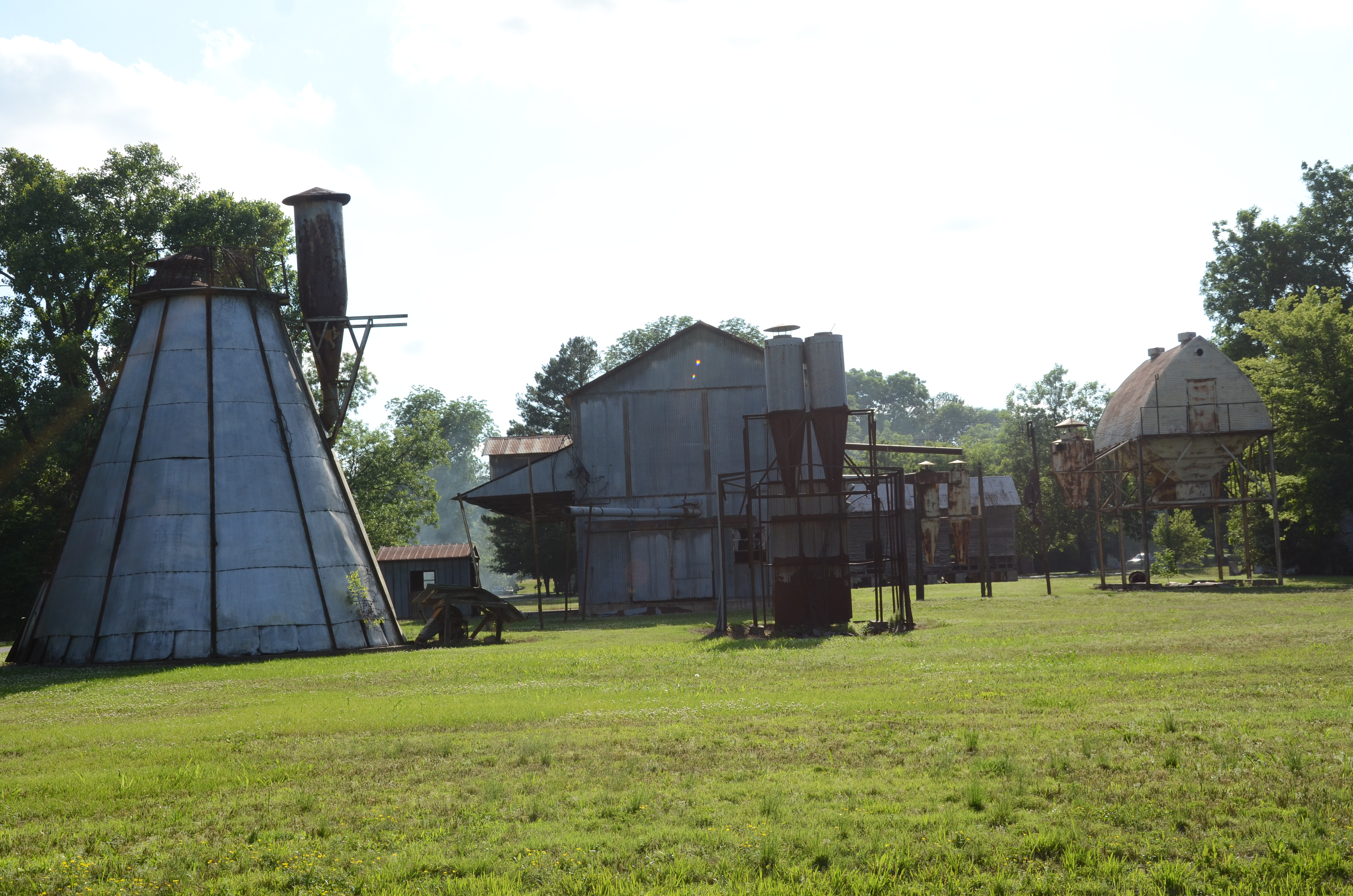
Historical Weldon Gin Co. 2016

== See also ==
- National Register of Historic Places listings in Jackson County, Arkansas
