= Bo Lacy =

American football player (born 1980)

No. 65, 67, 68
- Position: Offensive tackle

Personal information
- Born: November 22, 1980 (age 45); Newport, Arkansas, U.S.
- Listed height: 6 ft 4 in (1.93 m)
- Listed weight: 300 lb (136 kg)

Career information
- High school: Newport
- College: Arkansas
- NFL draft: 2004: 6th round, 177th overall pick

Career history
- Pittsburgh Steelers (2004)*; Cleveland Browns (2004); Pittsburgh Steelers (2004)*; Chicago Bears (2004); Indianapolis Colts (2005)*; Atlanta Falcons (2006)*
- * Offseason or practice squad member only

Gay "Bo" Lacy (born November 22, 1980) is an American former professional football offensive tackle. He played college football at Arkansas, where he was a two-year starter at left tackle. He was drafted by the Pittsburgh Steelers of the National Football League (NFL) in the sixth round of the 2004 NFL draft. He was also a member of the Cleveland Browns, Chicago Bears, Indianapolis Colts and Atlanta Falcons. He did not appear in an NFL regular season game.

== Early life and college ==
Lacy played high school football at Newport High School in Newport, Arkansas.

He played college football for the Arkansas Razorbacks of the University of Arkansas from 2000 to 2003. He was redshirted in 1999. He played in eight games as a right tackle in 2000. He played in the final eight games of the 2001 season, seeing action at left tackle and as a lineman on the extra point and field goal units. He started all 14 games at left tackle in 2002. He started all 13 games at left tackle in 2003. Lacy was a communications major at Arkansas.

== Professional career ==
Lacy was rated the 21st best offensive tackle in the 2004 NFL draft by NFLDraftScout.com. The website also predicted that he would be selected in the sixth or seventh round of the draft.

He was drafted by the Pittsburgh Steelers in the sixth round with the 177th overall pick of the draft. On July 20, it was reported that he had signed a three-year contract worth $993,900 with the Steelers. The contract also included a $73,900 signing bonus. He was waived by the Steelers on September 5 and signed to the team's practice squad on September 6.

On September 30, Lacy was signed off the Steelers' practice squad by the Cleveland Browns. He was waived by the Browns on October 20. He was then re-signed to the Steelers' practice squad on October 21.

On December 8, 2004, Lacy was signed off the Steelers' practice squad to a three-year contract with the Chicago Bears. He was waived by the Bears on August 30, 2005.

On September 5, 2005, Lacy was signed to the Indianapolis Colts' practice squad. He signed with the Colts on February 16, 2006. He was waived by the Colts on September 3.

Lacy was signed to the Atlanta Falcons' practice squad in October 2006. He was waived by the Falcons on September 1, 2007.

In 2012, Bleacher Report named Lacy as one of the ten biggest Steelers draft busts of the preceding decade, although it noted that other than quarterback Ben Roethlisberger, their entire 2004 draft class was a bust.
