= Arkansas Bank & Trust Company =

- U.S. National Register of Historic Places
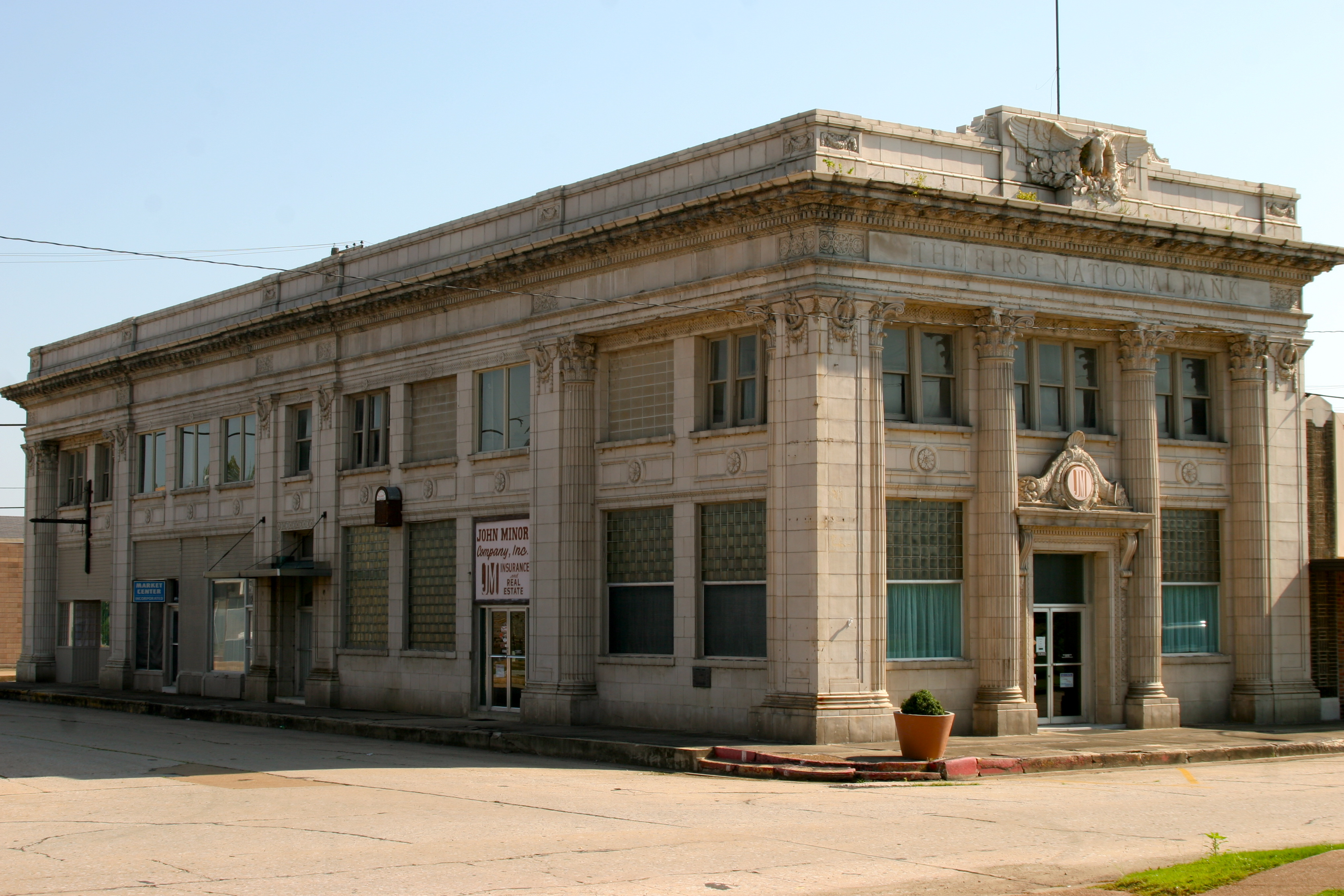

- Location within Arkansas Location within the United States
- Location: 103 Walnut St., Newport, Arkansas
- Coordinates: 35°36′21″N 91°17′0″W
- Area: less than one acre
- Built: 1916
- Architect: Mann & Stern
- Architectural style: Classical Revival
- NRHP reference No.: 86002859
- Added to NRHP: October 16, 1986

The Arkansas Bank & Trust Company is a historic commercial building at 103 Walnut Street in Newport, Arkansas. It is a two-story masonry structure, finished in terra cotta on its two street-facing facades, and brick on the others. It is an elegant example of Classical Revival architecture, designed by Mann & Stern of Little Rock and completed in 1916. It is one of the city's finest and most ornately decorated commercial buildings.

The building was listed on the National Register of Historic Places in 1986.

== See also ==
- National Register of Historic Places listings in Jackson County, Arkansas
