= Empie-Van Dyke House =

Historic house in Arkansas, United States

- U.S. National Register of Historic Places
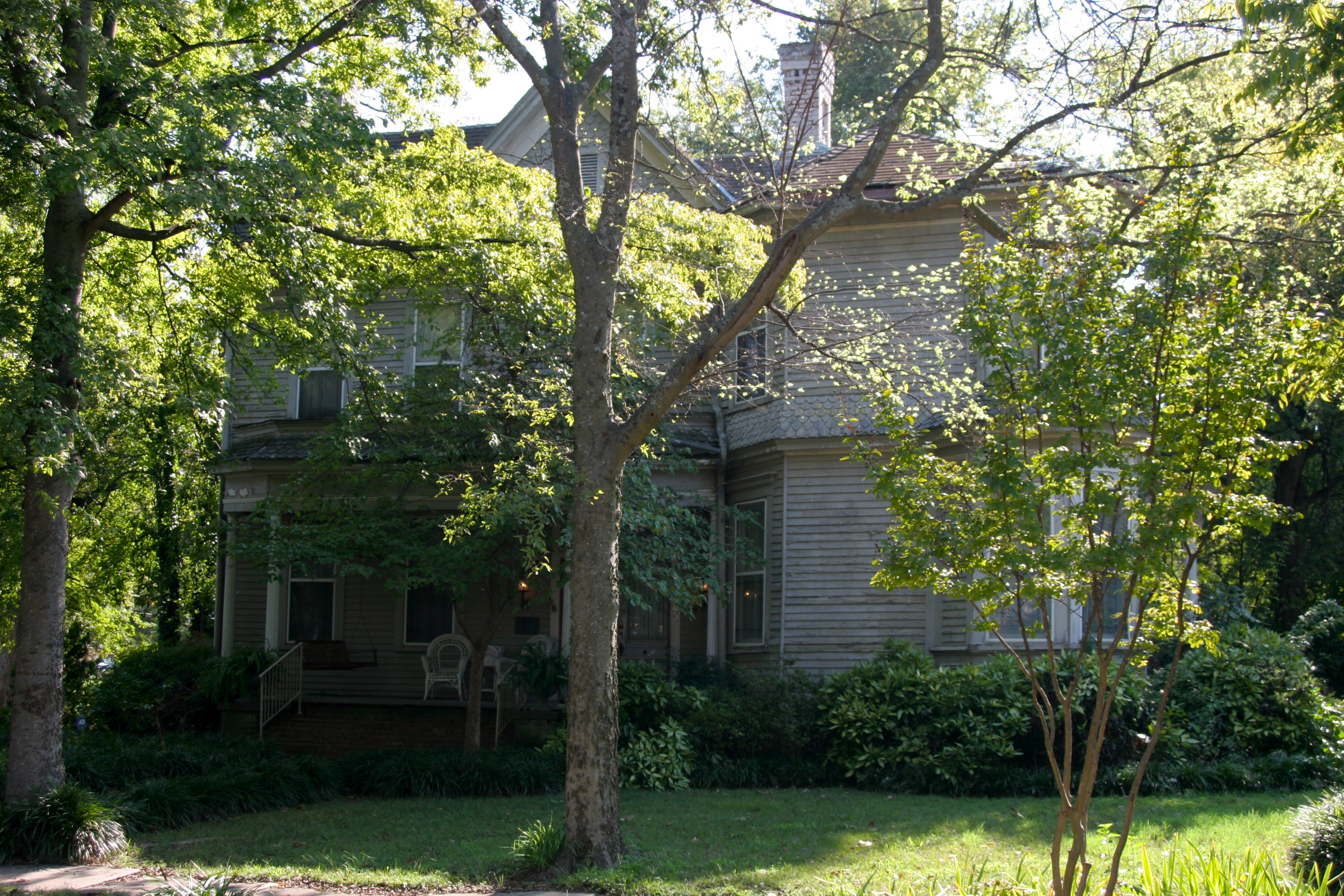

- Location within Arkansas Location within the United States
- Location: 403 Laurel, Newport, Arkansas
- Coordinates: 35°36′17″N 91°16′43″W
- Area: less than one acre
- Built: 1891
- Built by: W.B. Empie
- Architectural style: Queen Anne
- NRHP reference No.: 77000257
- Added to NRHP: December 28, 1977

The Empie-Van Dyke House is a historic house at 403 Laurel Street in Newport, Arkansas. It is a two-story wood-frame structure, with the asymmetrical massing typical of the Queen Anne style. It has two projecting sections, one at a corner that is topped by a pyramidal tower. Built in 1891, it was one of the first Queen Anne houses built in the city, and is one of its few older homes to survive with little alteration. It was built by William B. Empie, owner of local lumber-related businesses, and survived the town's great 1927 flood.

The house was listed on the National Register of Historic Places in 1977.

== See also ==
- National Register of Historic Places listings in Jackson County, Arkansas
