= Newport High School (Arkansas) =

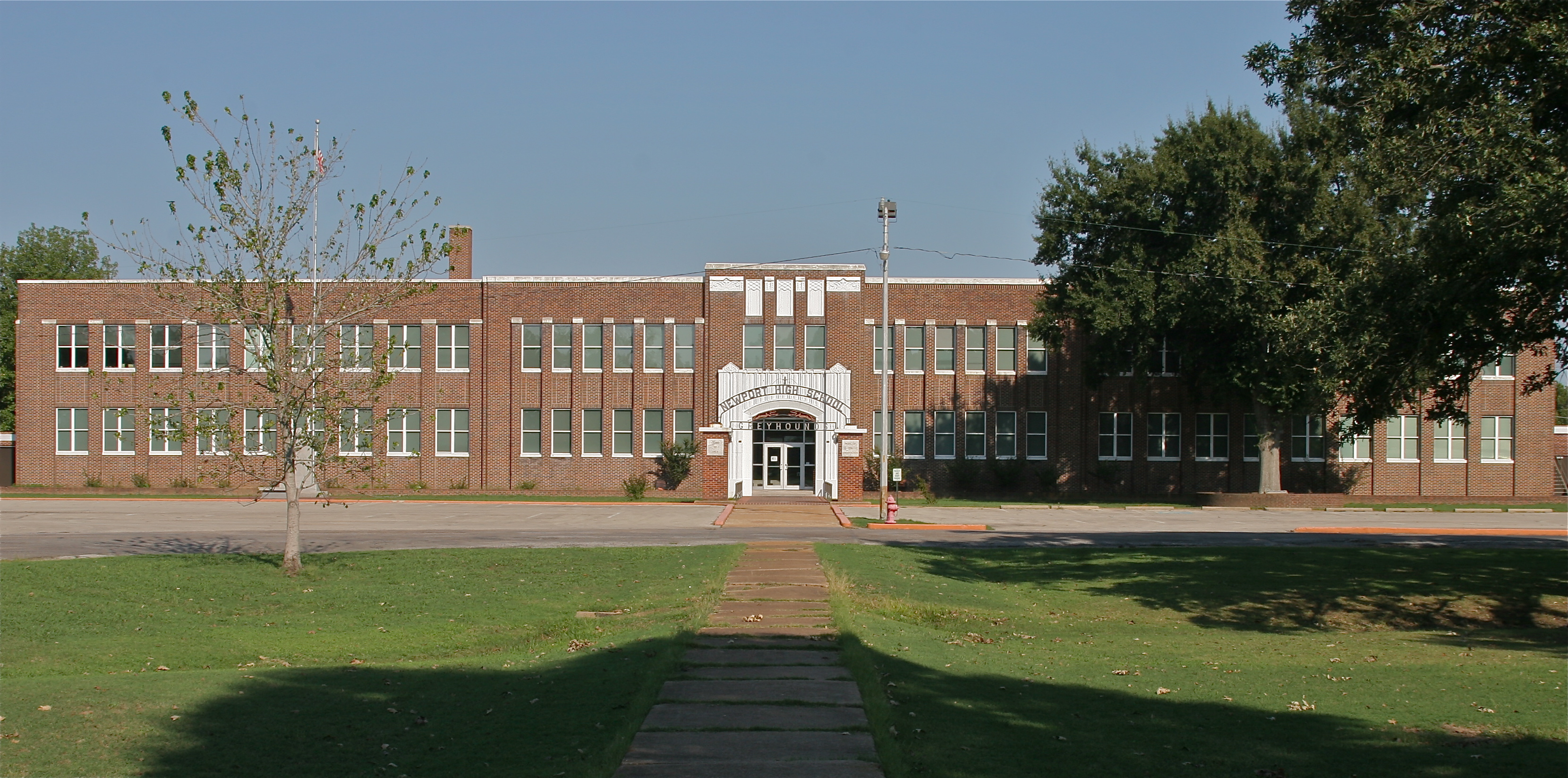

Location
- 406 Wilkerson Drive; Newport, Arkansas; United States; 35°36′4″N 91°16′22″W

Information
- Type: Public
- School district: Newport School District
- CEEB code: 041830
- NCES School ID: 0500023
- Principal: Coach Bradley
- Teaching staff: 78.65 (on FTE basis)
- Grades: 7-12
- Enrollment: 564 (2023-2024)
- Student to teacher ratio: 7.17
- Colors: Black and orange
- Athletics conference: 3a
- Mascot: Greyhound
- Team name: Newport Greyhounds
- Website: www.newportschools.org
- Newport Junior & Senior High School
- U.S. National Register of Historic Places
- Location within Arkansas Location within the United States
- Location: Remmel Park, Newport, Arkansas
- Area: less than one acre
- Built: 1930
- Architect: Thompson, Sanders and Ginocchio
- Architectural style: Modern Movement, Art Deco
- MPS: Thompson, Charles L., Design Collection TR
- NRHP reference No.: 82000839
- Added to NRHP: December 22, 1982

Newport High School is a comprehensive public high school serving students in grades nine through twelve in Newport, Arkansas, United States. It is the sole high school administered by the Newport School District.

== Academics ==
The assumed course of study at Newport High School exceeds the Smart Core curriculum developed by the Arkansas Department of Education (ADE). Students engage in regular and Advanced Placement (AP) coursework and exams to obtain at least 24 units beyond the 22 units required by the Smart Core curriculum. Exceptional students have been recognized as National Merit Finalists and participated in Arkansas Governor's School.

== Athletics ==
The school's mascot is the Greyhound with black and orange as the school colors.

For 2020–21, the Newport Greyhounds compete in the state's 3A classification within the 3A West Conference of the Arkansas Activities Association (AAA). The Greyhounds engage in numerous interscholastic activities, including baseball, basketball (boys/girls), cross country (boys/girls), football, golf, track, soccer, softball, tennis (boys/girls), and volleyball, along with marching band, cheer, and dance.

== Building ==
The main building of the high school was designed by Thompson, Sanders & Ginnochio and built in 1930. It is one of the firm's few Art Deco designs, and was listed on the National Register of Historic Places in 1982.

== Notable alumni ==
- Kaneaster Hodges, Jr. (1956), politician; U.S. senator (1977–79)
- Bo Lacy, football player
- Hallie Shoffner, farmer, business executive and politician

== See also ==
- List of high schools in Arkansas
- National Register of Historic Places listings in Jackson County, Arkansas
