= J. Fred Parish =

Arkansas politician

Member of the Arkansas Senate from the 29th district
- In office January 9, 1933 – January 4, 1937
- Preceded by: R. A. Nelson
- Succeeded by: Lucien E. Coleman

Personal details
- Born: John Frederick Parish; October 24, 1878 Jackson County, Arkansas, United States
- Died: January 26, 1937 (aged 58) Newport, Arkansas, United States
- Party: Democratic
- Spouse: Blanche Effie Raney
- Profession: Attorney

John Frederick Parish (1878-1937) was an attorney in the U.S. State of Arkansas who is most notable for having served in that state's senate from 1933 to 1937 after serving in local offices.

== Early life and career ==
Parish was born to John Wesley and Sarah Elizabeth Parish in 1878 in Jackson County, Arkansas. A few years after his birth, his father served in the Arkansas House of Representatives. He became an attorney, largely practicing in the community of Newport, Arkansas, and argued a few cases in the Arkansas Supreme Court. He also engaged with fraternal organizations such as the freemasons.

== Political career ==
Parish ran in his first election in 1916 when he successfully became Jackson County clerk. In 1922, he ran for and was elected to the position of county judge where he served for two terms.

In 1932, Parish ran for Arkansas state senate for the 29th district, which at the time covered Jackson, Poinsett, and Mississippi Counties, in the Democratic primaries for the office. His platform called for removal of the poll tax, addition of a second runoff for primaries, and reapportionment of senate seats in the region to remove Mississippi County from the 29th district. The results of the primary, in which incumbent R. A. Nelson also ran, were hotly contested by Nelson on allegations that over 2,000 more votes were cast in Poinsett County than people who had paid the poll tax. Lower courts ruled in favor of Parish. Nelson appealed the case all the way to the state supreme court which upheld the lower ruling. Parish won the general election, going to an assembly that was entirely Democratic and served two terms.

== Death ==
Parish died of pneumonia, a complication from influenza that occurred in January 1937. He died in Newport a few weeks after he left his seat in the Arkansas Senate.
