= Medallion Foods =

American snack food producer

Medallion Foods Inc.
- Company type: Subsidiary
- Founded: 1987; 39 years ago
- Headquarters: Newport, Arkansas, United States
- Parent: Ralcorp Holdings (2005-2014); Shearer's Foods (from 2014)

Medallion Foods Inc. is a snack food producer in Newport, Arkansas, United States. It is owned by Shearer's Foods.

== History ==
Medallion Foods was established in Newport, Arkansas in 1987. It produces corn-based snack products.

The company was purchased by Ralcorp Holdings in 2005 for $101.8 million. Ralcorp was then purchased by ConAgra Foods.

In April 2014, Shearer's Foods acquired the company from ConAgra for $33.5 million.
