= Newholm =

Newholm may refer to:

- Newholm, a village in Newholm-cum-Dunsley parish, North Yorkshire, England
- Newholm, a community in the town of Huntsville, Ontario, Canada
- SS Newholm, a British steamer sunk on 8 September 1917 by a mine laid by German U-boat SM UC-31

== See also ==
- Newholme Hospital, Bakewell, Derbyshire, England
- New Home (disambiguation)
