= Jackson County Courthouse (Arkansas) =

- U.S. National Register of Historic Places
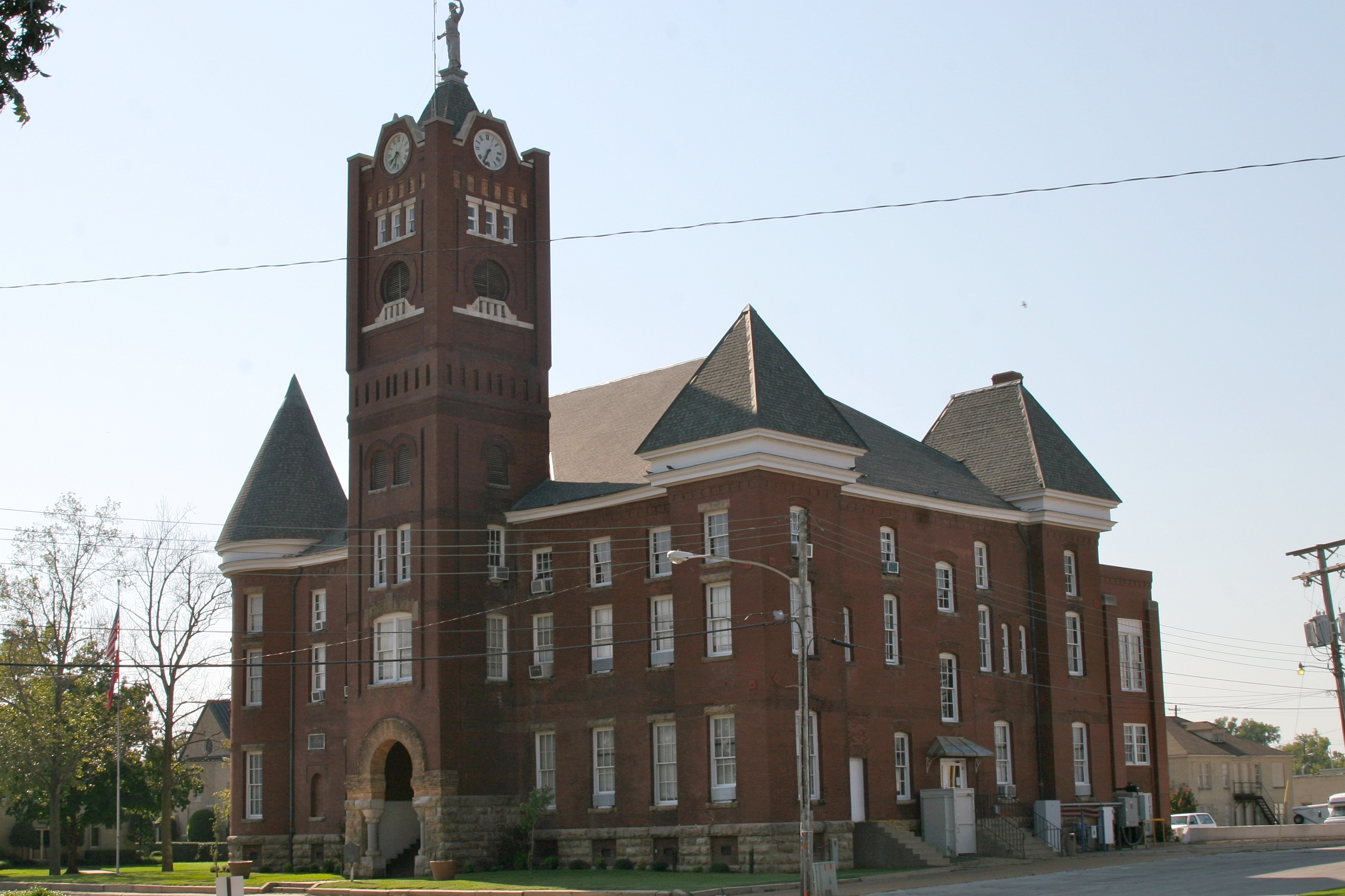

- Location within Arkansas Location within the United States
- Interactive map showing the location of Jackson County Courthouse
- Location: 200 Main St., Newport, Arkansas
- Coordinates: 35.6044°N 91.2829°W
- Built: 1892
- Architectural style: Late Victorian
- NRHP reference No.: 76000421
- Added to NRHP: November 18, 1976

The Jackson County Courthouse is located along Main Street (Arkansas Highway 367) in the center of Newport, Arkansas, the county seat of Jackson County. It is a Late Victorian brick building, with a protruding three-story square tower. It was built in 1892, and is one of the state's oldest courthouses. It was apparently based in part on the Ouachita County courthouse (since demolished), but its architect is not known.

The building was listed on the National Register of Historic Places in 1976.

== See also ==
- National Register of Historic Places listings in Jackson County, Arkansas
