= Newport School District (Arkansas) =

School district in Arkansas

Location
- 406 Wilkerson Drive; Newport, Arkansas 72112 United States

District information
- Grades: PK–12
- Established: 1876
- Superintendent: Jon E. Bradley
- Accreditation: Arkansas Department of Education
- Schools: 3
- NCES District ID: 0500023

Students and staff
- Students: 1,548
- Teachers: 121.09 (on FTE basis)
- Staff: 268.09 (on FTE basis)
- Student–teacher ratio: 12.78
- Athletic conference: 4A West (2012–14)
- District mascot: Greyhound
- Colors: Black; Orange

Other information
- Website: www.newportschools.org

Newport School District (NSD) is a public school district based in Newport, Arkansas. Established in 1876, NSD supports more than 1,500 students in prekindergarten through grade 12 in the 2010–11 school year by employing more than 260 faculty and staff on a full time equivalent basis for its five schools.

The school district encompasses 333.49 square miles (863.7 km^{2}) of land in Jackson County and serves all of Newport, Amagon, Beedeville, Jacksonport, Tupelo, and Weldon, and portions of Diaz.

== History ==
The Beedeville School District consolidated into the Newport School District on July 1, 1985.

== Athletics ==
Newport competes in interscholastic activities at the junior high and high schools in the 4A West conference administered by the Arkansas Activities Association.

== Schools ==
- Newport High School, serving grades 7 through 12.
- Newport Ełementary School, serving prekindergarten through grade 6.
