= List of For Better or For Worse characters =

The characters in Lynn Johnston's cartoon strip For Better or For Worse have extensive back stories. The birthdates of the characters given below were the characters' birthdates as shown on the strip's website prior to the cartoonist's decision to re-boot the strip from September 1, 2008, returning the setting to the early years of John and Elly's marriage.

== Main characters and blood relatives ==
- John Patterson (born February 17, 1950), m. Elizabeth ("Elly") Richards (born August 26, 1951)
  - Michael Thomas ("Mike") (born April 28, 1976), m. (September 15, 2001) Deanna Sobinski (born December 13, 1976)
    - Meredith Anne (born October 10, 2002)
    - Robin Michael (born November 1, 2004)
  - Elizabeth Deborah ("Liz") Caine (born June 26, 1980), m. (August 2008) Anthony Caine
    - James Allen Caine (born c. 2010)
  - April Marian (born April 1, 1991)

=== John and Elly Patterson ===
John Patterson (born February 17, 1950), is a dentist, whose hobby is model railroading. Although their marriage was shown as strong, their personalities and priorities often conflict: John is prone to splurging on expensive items such as stereos and luxury automobiles while Elly endeavors to be frugal. He is based on Lynn Johnston's real-life ex-husband Rod, also a dentist and model railroader. The flip side is that often with child discipline John is the cooler head, whereupon Elly is typically hot-tempered in most situations. Although John gets understandably angry over serious issues and dangerous events, he tries to balance it out and be a foil to Elly's frequent worrying and "mother meltdowns".

Elly Patterson, née Richards (born August 26, 1951), began as the strip's housewife protagonist. On occasion, she fills in for one of John's dental assistants, takes English classes, and takes a volunteer job writing for the local paper. She later works in the town library, then a local book store. John and Elly eventually buy the book store, expanding its inventory to include classic toys and model railroad kits. When Elly retires, she sells the title to the bookstore to Moira, an employee of hers. Elly was based on creator Lynn Johnston, who named the character after a late friend of hers.

=== Michael and Deanna Patterson ===
Michael Thomas Patterson (born April 28, 1976) is the oldest of Elly and John Patterson's three children. An alumnus of the University of Western Ontario, he is a senior editor at Portrait magazine. He marries Deanna Sobinski (born December 13, 1976,), a pharmacist and also a Western Alumna having been Michael's first childhood crush, with whom he had lost contact during her move to Burlington. She comes back into his life as an adult, the victim of a car crash Michael witnesses. The couple has two children: a daughter named Meredith Anne and a son named Robin Michael. Their apartment burns down, leading them to move back home with John and Elly. They eventually buy the house, while the senior Pattersons move to a nearby smaller house more suitable for an older couple.

Michael completes his first novel, Stone Season, on the night of an apartment fire in December 2006. During the fire, Michael's first instinct was to run into the burning room to save his manuscript; however Michael's poor judgment would then get him hospitalized for carbon monoxide poisoning. This drew heavy criticism from readers for committing such a self-centered act as opposed to most heads of the house whom, in an emergency, would rush to ensure the safety of their wives and children (though in this case Michael only went back for the manuscript after his wife and kids were already safely outside). In February 2007 he is offered a contract for its publication with a lucrative advance. Following his resignation from Portrait magazine rather than agreeing to his publisher's demands that he downsize his staff, Michael determines to concentrate solely on his writing. Deanna supports the family through her work managing the pharmacy in the same building as John's former dental office.

The final Sunday strip projected that in the future, Michael would become a successful author, with four published books and a screenplay deal, and that he would still collaborate regularly with Josef Weeder. Deanna was to leave her pharmacy job to open a small sewing school.

==== Meredith Anne Patterson ====
Meredith is born at Fairview General Hospital on October 10, 2002 at 5:15 a.m., weighing 7lbs 4oz. She is the daughter of Michael and Deanna. The strip shows her maturity from infancy to becoming a toddler. The final Sunday strip projected that in the future, Meredith has gone into dance and theater at age 10.

==== Robin Michael Patterson ====
Robin (born November 1, 2004, by Caesarean section) is the son of Michael and Deanna. In 2006, he suffers a fever brought on by an ear infection. The final Sunday strip projected that in the future, he is said to have learned how to cook from Deanna at age 8.

=== Elizabeth Deborah Caine (née Patterson) ===
Elizabeth (born June 26, 1980), John and Elly's adult daughter. Throughout her childhood, her brother Michael refers to her by such names as "Lizardbreath" and "Sistwirp", and they frequently fight to the dismay of Elly and John. As she and Michael mature, they put the sibling rivalry aside and form a good adult relationship, which is bolstered by them both being required to help care for their much-younger sister April. She studies education at Nipissing University in North Bay, does her practice teaching assignment in nearby Garden Village and subsequently teaches on an Indian reserve in the fictional town of Mtigwaki. While at school, Elizabeth rooms with Candace, her childhood frenemy. In 2001, she begins dating a boy named Eric. They move in together, but Eric is emotionally abusive, gas-lighting Elizabeth while cheating on her with her friends.

In a story arc starting in late July 2005 and culminating in the August 11, 2005 strip, she is stalked and assaulted by Howard Bunt, her coworker at a landscaping business owned and operated by her longtime friend Lawrence Poirier and his partner, Nicholas Browne. She is rescued by Anthony Caine, her high school boyfriend, who takes her away from her work immediately after the assault to reveal that his marriage has been failing and that he still loves her.

Elizabeth later declines to renew her teaching contract in Mtigwaki and teaches summer school in Milborough in summer 2006. She acquires a full-time teaching job closer to home and moves back in with her parents until she eventually finds her own place. Although she partakes in a long-distance relationship with Constable Paul Wright, his affair with Elizabeth's replacement teacher Susan ends their romance. When Elizabeth and Anthony both attend the July 2007 wedding of their friend Shawna-Marie, they rekindle their relationship. They become engaged in the March 13, 2008 strip and are married in the August 25, 2008 strip. In the series' epilogue strip, it was revealed that their first son, James Allen, would be born before her grandfather Jim's death in 2010.

The strip started in 1979 and Elizabeth was already present. However, when Lynn Johnston decided to have her characters age in real time Elizabeth's birth was retconned to have taken place in 1980.

=== April Marian Patterson ===
April (born April 1, 1991, hence her name) is the teenage daughter of John and Elly Patterson. When Lynn Johnston wanted another child but found it impossible due to infertility, she chose to create one for the strip; resulting in April's birth. In 1995, Elly sees that the four-year-old April has figured out how to unlatch the back gate and get out of the yard, but does not take steps to secure the gate, figuring April is old enough to go play in the backyard on her own. This leads to a near-tragedy several weeks later when April, having left the yard, falls into a swollen stream while playing on a nearby riverbank and has to be rescued by the family's pet dog, Farley, who dies afterward.

April is one of the founders of local garage band, 4Evah (later renamed 4Evah & Eva). Although by and large a decent girl, April has a problematic streak with her parents and siblings, partly due to moodiness and withdrawal from hormonal changes during her adolescence (which has also been a problem of her older brother Michael), as well as annoyance at being made to pull her own weight around the house, arguing that she should enjoy life, which is rectified by a stern rebuke from Elizabeth about how every member of the family works and helps out around the house. Both problems are largely solved when Elly puts April to work in the family business of the bookstore/toy store after school and on weekends. After visiting her aunt's farm in 2006, she begins to consider becoming a veterinarian. The series' epilogue strip told that April would go to university and graduate with a veterinary medicine degree. Her love of horses would lead her to an opportunity to work with the Calgary Stampede in Calgary, Alberta. She is said to be living a "country life" and has an unnamed country boyfriend.

=== James Richards ===
Elly's father, James Richards (March 21, 1921–2010), known to the Patterson family and readers as "Grandpa Jim", is a World War II veteran of the Royal Canadian Air Force's 408 Squadron. When his wife Marian dies in 1998, Jim begins living with Elly and John for several years and becomes very close with his younger granddaughter April, first giving her a harmonica that he kept with him during his time in the military, then later teaching her how to play the guitar. He meets Iris Reid in 2000, moves to an apartment in the same seniors' housing building soon thereafter, and elopes to England in 2003. At an earlier time in his life, Jim had participated in a band called the Bentwood Rockers. April's success with her band inspires Jim to form another band, aptly named the New Bentwood Rockers.

Jim suffers a stroke in September 2006 and spends several weeks in the hospital. He is able to return to his apartment under the care of Iris and home health aides. While the readers were aware that there was less damage to Jim's brain than originally feared (as evidenced by his still sharp thought balloons), his ability to speak is severely impaired, and the other characters remain unsure about just how much damage has been done.

In the October 3, 2007 strip, Jim is found in an unresponsive state by a horrified Iris. He has suffered another stroke and is temporarily in a coma at the hospital. Once again he recovers enough to return home to Iris's care; however, his health is declining rapidly and Elizabeth, hearing April's description of Jim's failing health after April had visited her grandfather, accelerates her wedding plans to enable him to attend.

In the August 16, 2008 strip, Jim's health goes into further decline with a myocardial infarction, but Elizabeth and Anthony forego the traditional wedding reception and "Just Married" ride-off in a festooned car, instead immediately leaving the church after their vows to visit Jim (as well as putting their honeymoon plans on hold). The August 31 epilogue strip revealed that Jim would live long enough to see a final great-grandson who was the product of Anthony and Elizabeth's marriage, and named James in his honor, and die in 2010 at the age of 89.

=== Marian Richards ===
Jim's first wife and Elly and Phil's mother, who dies in 1998 after a long bout with heart disease. The series about Marian's final days was heavily based on Johnston's own experiences with the death of her mother, Ursula Ridgway. A few of the real-life Ursula's quotes were placed in Marian's mouth to reflect her courage in the face of death.

=== Iris Richards, née Reid ===
Iris Richards, née Reid, who becomes Jim's second wife, meets Jim at a Legion dance in 2000. Iris lives in a senior apartment; shortly after they meet, Jim moves into an apartment in the same building. They elope to England in 2003. When Elly hears the news of her father's remarriage, she is beside herself, not so much as having a stepmother but her fear about why her father has decided to make a rash decision to remarry. Elly is told by John to stop worrying so much about her father and that they will welcome Iris.

Iris' first husband is named George Reid; together they have three children. Elly's step-brother Jordan lives with his second wife and two children from his first marriage on a ranch near Calgary; step-sister Maggie and her husband and daughter live in Arizona; and step-sister Sarah and her husband live in nearby Barrie. George dies in 1999, and Iris meets Jim several months later. None of Iris' children are ever seen in the strip.

=== Phil Richards ===
Elly's younger brother, a trumpeter who earns money as a musician and a music teacher. He lives in Montreal with a rather bohemian life when the strip begins, and has a relationship with Connie. He later lives in Millborough for several years, appearing frequently in the strip, but becomes a minor character in later years and it is eventually revealed that he and his wife, Georgia, have moved back to Montreal. Two major story arcs involved Phil, one being that he and John are stranded on a small island in the back country after bad weather causes a canoeing accident, which was based on a real-life experience involving Rod Johnston and another man, and their outback survival and later rescue, which convinces Phil to stop cohabiting and marry Georgia. Another was Georgia and Phil's wedding, which was the first wedding shown in FBoFW, and the first one which Michael and Elizabeth attend. Phil and Georgia were seen as a couple, but their marriage was without issue.

=== Georgia Richards ===
Wife of Phil Richards, and the sister-in-law of Elly, and a flautist who shares his love of music. Unlike Phil, Georgia sees music as a hobby, not a career, and makes her living as an audiologist. Georgia supports Phil after a doctor convinces him to quit smoking. Georgia and Phil live together for several years before marrying, and eventually buy a home in Milborough. One major arc that included Georgia shows that John and Phil have been stranded while canoeing. It depicted her worry with Elly, then traveling to Elly to be reunited with Phil when he is found, who also is going to be reunited with John. Phil's experience with wilderness survival arguably teaches him that life is limited, and he proposes marriage to Georgia shortly afterwards. It is later revealed by another character that she and Phil have moved to Montreal, but still make occasional trips to visit Elly and John.

=== William and Carrie Patterson ===
John Patterson's parents. They are rarely seen in the strip but live close to daughter Bev's farm near Winnipeg. Their eldest son, Bill, is never seen in strip. Their first introduction was when they come to visit during Christmas and take care of the kids while John and Elly go on vacation. Later, John, lacking money to have the entire family visit his parents, decides to buy an airline ticket for Michael only to see his paternal grandparents, and also to teach Michael a lesson in manhood by flying across Canada as an unaccompanied minor. Although a minor character, Carrie Patterson visits during the time when Farley dies, and helps console Elizabeth and April over his death.

=== Anthony Caine ===
Elizabeth's former high school boyfriend turned husband, who works for Gordon Mayes. In his biography on the official website, Anthony comes from a troubled family life, an inattentive mother, and a cold, business-like father; something that both he and Thérèse share. Despite feeling happy for a time with his stepmother, he remembers their relationship as distant due to her unintentionally revealing her preference for having her own child. His stepmother Clarice, goes through many hormone treatments, making her very moody for Anthony to be around. With his somewhat non-paternal father, this makes Anthony very neglected and possibly depressed. His half-sister Abby is born in 1995. While he likes his sister, he is a bit jealous of how his parents practically neglect him, once more. But he finds that he has good parental figures in his step-grandparents. Although he has bad times, his stepmother and half sister still remain part of his life more than his father. After a set of on/off again relationships with Liz, he meets Thérèse. The two have a strained relationship for many reasons, one could be Thérèse's constant paranoia, lack of trust, domineering treatment, pressures from both their families, and his lingering feelings for Elizabeth. The relationship becomes more strained than many know once Thérèse becomes pregnant, mostly because her parents pressure her into becoming a mother, and she begins to resent the inconveniences of being pregnant. Her pregnancy also has her jealousy very high and she blows up at him for sitting next to Tracy. Eventually, Anthony concludes that his wife is afraid of being a mother, because she thinks her career is threatened. To ease his wife, he volunteers to stay and take care of the baby all on his own with her continuing to work. She makes him go through with the deal and takes no interest or desire to care (much less bond) for their infant. It becomes clear even before and during the pregnancy that Thérèse suffers from postpartum depression. Though her counseling leaves her replenished, she basically chooses work over her family and neglects her husband and child. It is during this turbulence that he reunites with Elizabeth after saving her from a would-be rapist. But he unintentionally reveals his marital woes to her. The final blow to his marriage comes when she announces, in an almost cold manner, that she is having an affair and is moving in with the other man. This leaves him to raise their daughter alone, but when the divorce is settled and over, his stepmother Clarice helps as a babysitter and insists he get out to relieve his nerves. After finalizing his divorce from Thérèse, he reunites with Liz at a friend's wedding and the two begin to rekindle their relationship. They become engaged and are married on August 25, 2008. The series' epilogue strip projects that Anthony will rekindle Elizabeth's love of ballroom dancing and develop an interest in opening a bed and breakfast with her when they eventually retire. He and Elizabeth also became the proud parents of James Allen, who was born before grandfather Jim's death in 2010.

=== Bev and Dan Cruikshank ===
John Patterson's sister and her husband who operates a family farm, formerly owned by her father Will, outside of Winnipeg. Dan manages the farm and Bev is a veterinarian. Their daughter Laura works on the farm and assists her mother with the veterinary practice. The Patterson family as a whole visits them on occasion, one time where the Cruikshanks invite their extended family in order for the entire clan to enjoy a rural Christmas. Three more story arcs would follow in turn revolving around each of the Patterson children individually spending a summer in their teenage years helping out on the farm. Elizabeth's arc showed her learning to ride horses and partaking in the Cruikshank's hobby of going to auctions, whereupon she acquires her pet rabbit. Michael's arc was his reluctance to go be with the Cruikshanks due to his separation from his then-girlfriend Martha, but eventually coming to appreciate the value of a hard day's work and the uniqueness of rural life.

== Supporting characters ==
Agnes Dingle
The landlady of Michael and Josef (Weed) Weeder while the two were attending the University of Western Ontario in London. Though often moody and irascible, she gradually reveals a gentle heart that allows her to warm to her tenants as good friends. Agnes has a stroke in 2004 (which would have been fatal if Michael had not attempted to call her at that very moment) and retires to live nearer her children. Michael's first novel, Stone Season, is supposed to be a fictional retelling of Agnes' life.

Candace Halloran
Elizabeth's roommate at Nipissing University in North Bay (near Johnston's current residence in Corbeil). The two have known each other since their middle school days and reunite during Elizabeth's first year at university, becoming close friends. A former rebel with a troubled home life, Candace studies psychology and plans to become a counsellor to troubled teenagers. In her biography on the official website, she finds a partner in her boyfriend Rudy. Both even plan to have a child together.

Moira Kinney
Elly's employee at the bookstore. Having worked for the ex-owner Lily Petrucci, Moira stays on when Elly buys the store in 2000. Moira buys the business from Elly in 2006, with John and Elly retaining the mortgage on the property.

Shannon Lake
A slow-speaking girl in April's home economics class and part of her school's special education program. Shannon's reasons for being in that program are not specifically addressed in the strip, but on a detailed section of the official website. Shannon was based on Lynn's former brother-in-law's stepdaughter, Stephanie Haskins.

Ted McCaulay
John's friend and a doctor in the Medical Arts Building where John has his dental practice. He is portrayed as an incorrigible male chauvinist whose only long-term female relationship is with his mother. He dates Connie Poirier for a time after her relationship with Phil Richards ends. However, Connie has shown more interest in another man, and Ted starts a relationship with his secretary Irene; marrying her just months before Connie moves to Thunder Bay. Ted is unfaithful to Irene and she walks out on him, later divorcing him for adultery. John actually says to Ted's face that Irene has made the right decision in splitting up. In his official biography, he seems to show a great deal of caring for Lawrence's feelings when he dates Connie and is surprised by his coldness when they date again, wondering what has happened in his mother's last relationship. It is also hinted that his marriage to Irene stems out of the shock and depression brought on by Connie leaving him for Greg. He begins to cheat on Irene when he finds his new wife very dull. His mother is always happy to see Connie or Irene go, constantly criticizing them and their faults, which implies the root of Ted's problems is that he has had an overprotective mother who says no woman is good enough for her son. Ted's mother eventually dies in 2005, and he inherits the house they shared. Ted then brings it upon himself to stop womanizing and starts a healthy relationship with a woman who is a retired school headmistress. Although both partners seem to enjoy a committed, relaxed relationship, they have not ruled out the possibility of an eventual marriage.

Becky McGuire
April's on-again, off-again friend since childhood. She is a founding member of "4-Evah", as its keyboard player and lead singer, later leaving the band when she is offered a chance at a singing contract. Becky's character arc develops in that she grows up to be boy-crazy in high school, which leads to problems of her being jerked around by older boys. Becky also has problems with shallowness that causes rifts with April, particularly April's offer for Shannon to help out with 4Evah, then later her shock to see a popular boy develop an interest in Shannon instead of Becky, whereupon she remarks "how could a hunk like that go for a special needs girl?" Under her stage name of Rebecca (sometimes Rebecah), she develops moderate fame as a singer.

Gordon Mayes
Gordon is Michael's childhood friend who is a year older than Michael and Lawrence, but attends the same classes as his schoolfriends either due to grade retention or being enrolled in elementary school a year late. The son of alcoholic and sometimes abusive parents, he makes his own fortune through buying an auto-repair garage, eventually parlaying that into several successful businesses (most notably car dealership Mayes Motors), with the help of John Patterson as a silent partner. His wife and high school sweetheart Tracey helps him run the fuel station, but spends much of her effort being a housewife and mother. They have two children, Paul and Rosemary, for whom Elizabeth and April were frequent babysitters. Gordon becomes estranged from his parents prior to his marriage due to his feeling that they are bad influences. When his parents learn that Gordon has children, they work to seek sobriety treatments and counseling to cure them of alcoholism in the hopes that they can become good grandparents to Gordon's children. Gordon has been the second most cited character to raise controversy (the first being Lawrence for his homosexuality), as author Lynn Johnston has said she dealt with numerous complaints stating that most children from abusive homes usually grow up to unconsciously emulate their parents' poor characteristic, and that Gordon's portrayal as an abused boy who grew up to become a successful business owner as well as a dedicated husband and father is unrealistic and too much of a "happy ending". Johnston has defended her portrayal of Gordon on the basis that she believes with hard work and a strong moral code it is possible for those who had adverse pasts to rise above it.

Tracey Mayes (née Wells)
Tracey is first introduced when Gordon and Michael are in high school, being shown as a friend of both since childhood. Originally Tracey is Michael's date to a semi-formal dance, but Michael has been mortified by a bad case of acne. Not wanting to abandon Tracey and seeing how Gordon has been struggling with datelessness, Michael sets Gordon up with Tracey. The relationship of Tracey and Gordon was one of the atypical couples in FBoFW in that it starts out slow, with both Gordon and Tracey worried that romance sours a good friendship. However, in time the "spark" flares up, and it leads to a rock-steady marriage. Tracey is both a good business partner of Gordon's as well as a devoted wife and mother to two children.

Connie Thomas (née Poirier)
Mother of Lawrence, and Elly's closest friend since their days at the University of Toronto. According to Lynn Johnston's retrospective A Look Inside...[FBOFW], Connie was intended to be both a feminist shrew and an antagonistic counterpart to Elly Patterson, and was named for an incompetent art teacher Lynn had had in high school, but the character mellowed within a few weeks to a struggling single mother, and gradually evolved into Elly's closest friend. Connie has been previously married to Peter Landry. For many years he was assumed to be Lawrence's father, but in a retcon storyline in the summer of 1998, Connie reveals that she had met Brazilian doctor Pablo da Silva after university while they were both working in Ecuador as part of a travelling medical team; Connie had become pregnant and assumed that Pablo would return to Canada with her but, when he did not, she decided to raise their son alone. Connie also has relationships with Elly's brother Phil and John's friend Ted, then marries Greg Thomas, becoming stepmother to his daughters Gayle and Molly. Connie is initially reluctant to accept Lawrence's coming out when he reveals his homosexuality to her as a teenager, but since then has accepted her son's sexual orientation.

Lawrence Poirier
Michael's best friend since childhood. In 1993, it is revealed that Lawrence is gay. He hires Elizabeth to work for his landscaping business, Lakeshore Landscaping, but only for summer in two times. His partner is Nicholas Browne.

Olivia "Lovey" Saltzman
Michael and Deanna's landlady in Toronto. Lovey has a warm friendship with Michael and Deanna from the start of their tenancy, often helping out the couple by preparing meals and babysitting. Olivia is also the one who smooths over the problems with Michael and his mother-in-law, Mira Sobinski, by revealing to Mira that she has had problems with her own daughter, who decided to move with her family to Seattle, America to distance herself from her mother's constant, but unwanted, advice. A common bond between Mira and Lovey is that both are Polish; their respective parents having come to Canada as refugees in the 1940s. She arranges for them to move into her building's larger apartment at a discounted rate to accommodate their growing family. She reveals that her parents named her in honour of the actress Olivia de Havilland.

Josef Myron "Weed" Weeder
A professional photographer who is Michael's university friend, roommate and later journalistic partner. Weed has a strained relationship with his wealthy family, especially his father who initially wants him to reject photography and join the family business. His father finally reconsiders Weed's photography business and is impressed enough to heavily invest into it.

== Minor characters ==
Eva Abuya
April's friend and classmate, who replaces Becky McGuire as the singer in the band 4Evah, leading it to be renamed 4Evah & Eva. She has taken the mantle of April's best friend, since Becky's drift from her old friends. She and Duncan appear to be interested in each other. When April's family moves out of the house, Eva notices April's spoiled demeanour and believes she should be grateful. She is African-Canadian.

Duncan Anderson
April's classmate and bandmate in the group 4Evah & Eva.

Ruby Andrews
Candace's aunt. She owns a convenience store in North Bay, where her niece and Elizabeth go to university. Ruby is mugged while minding the store. She recovers and sells the business.

Thelma Baird (née Clifford)
(1904 - May 1988), a kindly old woman and the Patterson family's neighbour. Born in the Yorkshire Dales, England to a farming family with a tradition of breeding old English Sheepdogs, Thelma had expected to live in the Dales all her life until she met William Baird when she was 20. A hired man on the family farm, William's ambitions to rise above his traditional roots and work with machines took the newly wed couple to southern Ontario, where William became a dealer in farm machinery, with Thelma as his business partner. Their business survived the Depression years and boomed during the Second World War; by 1946, the Bairds had five dealerships and 25 employees. Sadly for Thelma, who always wanted children, the couple's business responsibilities never allowed them either the time or the money to raise a family before William's death from incurable cancer in the early 1950s. Shortly before her husband's death, Thelma sold their business and the couple moved to a house in the neighbourhood of Sharon Park in Milborough. After William's death, Thelma resumed her family's tradition of breeding sheepdogs, eventually becoming a dog show judge and Secretary of the Canadian Kennel Club before finally retiring in 1974. After the Pattersons moved in next door in 1980, Thelma became Michael's and Elizabeth's babysitter, and an extra grandmother to the family. Soon afterwards, she gave her new neighbours a puppy, the grandson of one of her champion show dogs; the Pattersons name him Farley. (Johnston chose the name to honour the Canadian writer Farley Mowat.) Thelma moved into a seniors' residence in 1987, taking up a late-in-life relationship with Ed Smith, a fellow resident. She died in her sleep in May 1988; her death was the first in FBorFW.

Jean Baker
John's longtime assistant at the dental clinic. In 1985, she has a daughter named Brittany.

Warren Blackwood
A helicopter pilot who keeps up a long-distance friendship (with romantic overtones) with Elizabeth. In the spring of 2008 he visits Elizabeth with hopes of a deeper relationship, but discovers that she is engaged to Anthony. Warren wishes Elizabeth well with Anthony, who, in turn, hopes that Warren would find the right woman for himself, and the two part ways peacefully. Warren's biography on the official website shows that he has a brother and is an uncle to two boys and a girl.

Rhetta Blum
Michael's third girlfriend, from his later high school years. Their relationship ends during Michael's time at university: he dreams of travelling and seeing the world and she wants to stay at home in Milborough near her family. They reunite briefly, but Michael's growing attraction to Deanna and his discovery that Rhetta has met someone new leads to him ending their relationship amicably by e-mail.

Nicholas Browne
Lawrence's domestic partner, with whom he co-owns Lakeshore Landscaping in North Bay.

Howard Bunt
An employee at Lawrence Poirier's landscaping business who stalks and assaults Elizabeth in the summer of 2005. He is stopped by Anthony Caine and soon after is fired by Lawrence. He is eventually charged (the exact charge was never specified) and stands trial. Before the trial, it was suggested other young women were assaulted by Howard and were coming forward, although it is unknown if he was charged in those incidents. In the strip dated February 22, 2007, he is found guilty and sentenced to two years less a day in prison to be served without parole, and to also be placed in psychiatric treatment.

Françoise "Francie" Caine
Daughter of Anthony and Thérèse Caine who is born on March 7, 2005. She is in Anthony's custody. She has her father wrapped around her finger and managed to convince him to shave off his mustache, complaining that his facial hair made him look old. Francie misses Thérèse terribly; when the two meet when Elizabeth unexpectedly runs into Thérèse on a shopping trip, Francie is excited to see her. She is crestfallen when Thérèse seems more concerned that Francie liked the presents that Thérèse had sent her, saying, "But I don't want things, Mama... I want you!" Thérèse makes a hasty exit, telling Francie to go with Elizabeth and "promising" her that she will call. Though understandably jealous of the relationship between Anthony and Elizabeth at first, Francie has accepted Elizabeth as her stepmother and was a flower girl at Anthony and Elizabeth's wedding.

Thérèse Caine (née Arsenault)
Anthony's first wife. The two have had a contentious relationship, exacerbated by Anthony's lingering feelings for Elizabeth and possible pressures from both sides of their families. During their relationship, Thérèse is constantly paranoid that Anthony is cheating on her; so much so that she once accuses Gordon's wife, Tracey, of hitting on Anthony. Thérèse does not want to give up her career to become a stay at home mother like her family wants. When she becomes pregnant, Anthony is thrilled, but she is not. Nevertheless, she carries the baby to term. But it is clear she is showing postpartum depression and shows resentment of her pregnancy. To ease his wife's fear of losing a career, Anthony agrees to be the main caregiver of the baby so she could continue to work. It is a deal Thérèse makes him go through with completely, and takes little or no interest in bonding with her child; if anything she avoids even looking at Francie. When Thérèse's post-partum depression worsens, Anthony continues to be supportive of her and seeks therapy for her. Though it "opens" her eyes to things she wanted; it is clear her family and husband are not in those plans. She continues to work and while she pays for expenses she still has no interest in caring for Francie. She eventually excels at work and gets promoted. During the time apart from Anthony, Thérèse seems happier, as does Anthony, until she coldly announces that she is having an affair with a client and was moving in with him. The affair stuns Anthony, but even more stunning is that Thérèse leaves Francie with him as if she is a piece of property. Even after having left Anthony, she still blames him for "not being man enough" for her, but soon realizes that he has remained committed to the marriage, which she had been unwilling to do. Thérèse's last appearance in the strip is an unexpected meeting with Elizabeth and Francie at the mall, where Thérèse reveals that she has been sending presents to her daughter. When Francie begs to spend more time with her, however, Thérèse quickly bolts out of the mall, leaving Francie devastated and crying in Elizabeth's arms. Anthony Caine's biography hints that things with her lover are not going well, but Anthony does not take pleasure in this turn of events, believing that Thérèse is still trying to find herself and wishes every bit of happiness for her.

Everett Callahan
John's associate at the dental practice, a young-aged dentist who is up-to-date with current techniques and procedures. John intends to turn the practice over to Everett when John retires. In the monthly letters, John occasionally refers to his associate as "Elliot."

Eric Chamberlain
Elizabeth's ex-boyfriend from university and roommate of Rudy, later Candace's boyfriend. Elizabeth moves in with Eric after her first year, but breaks off the relationship when she catches him seeing another woman. Tina believes that Elizabeth and Eric are just roommates, while Elizabeth believes that Eric is at hockey practice.

Gary Crane
The headmaster of the elementary school in Mtigwaki where Elizabeth teaches. In one arc, he yells at children who are looking at Elizabeth baking cookies through her window in order to discourage Peeping Tom behavior. While Elizabeth admits to Gary she feels the kids are doing it innocently, he replies they need to be taught respect for other people's privacy, then later offers to help Elizabeth adjust to Indian village life by sharing his hobby of fishing. His surname is given as Crow on the August 2008 strip when he and Vivian arrive for Elizabeth and Anthony's wedding. The strip on the official site was quickly fixed during the day, but copies posted elsewhere and printed in newspapers retained the error.

Vivian Crane
Gary's wife. She runs the medical station in Mtigwaki.

Allyson Creemore
An attractive blonde girl who attended the same junior high as Gordon and Michael. Gordon is one day overcome with a huge limerance on her, but she was dating a basketball player named Peter Cook, causing Gordon to remark "The Invisible Man exists". She would appear in a story arc where the kids went to a Christmas semiformal only to have her boyfriend, who was drinking heavily, pressure Allyson into drinking then abandon her when she was weakened by hard liquor. Gordon comes to Allyson's "rescue" by taking her home in a cab, while Peter instigates fights at the dance and lands in serious trouble. After Gordon married Tracey, he later learned Allyson married a man she'd known for only 3 months. Tracey dryly remarked that “maybe she’d found the right dress”.

Rudy Dodd
Candace's boyfriend. Once a roommate of Eric Chamberlain's at Nipissing University, he meets Candace through Elizabeth and Eric and bonds with her instantly as, like her, he also comes from a troubled home life growing up. In Candace's biography on the website, it is said that she and Rudy are domestic partners. Most likely due to their trouble home lives, neither one feels comfortable with being married, but they are shown to be very happy and are thinking of having a child together.

Susan Dokis
A young woman of Native descent who replaces Elizabeth as the primary grade's teacher at the school in Mtigwaki. She is also a childhood friend of Paul Wright. Elizabeth breaks off her relationship with Paul when she returns to Mtigwaki a day earlier than planned and finds him at Susan's house. In the website official biography, though both Paul and Elizabeth contribute to the breakdown of their relationship, Susan pointedly blames Elizabeth and believed that Paul's relationship with her did not have anything special.

Sharon Taylor, née Edwards
Elizabeth's favourite teacher during her middle school years. Sharon inspires Elizabeth greatly by building a teaching career despite being a paraplegic (there was an inconsistency in how she acquired her disability: in one strip she states that she was badly injured in a motorcycle crash as a teenager; earlier quotes infer that she was a wheelchair user from early childhood at least). Sharon marries Lorne Taylor. Her first child, a boy named Ethan James, is born by Caesarean section in 2007.

Brian Enjo
Michael's former childhood friend and the son of Keith and Carol Enjo, neighbours of the Pattersons. He moves to Japan and marries a Japanese woman, Junko. He and Michael keep in touch via e-mail.

Carol Enjo
The mother of Brian and Dawn Enjo, and wife of Keith Enjo. She was sometimes shown with the Pattersons, although not socializing with them as much as the Nichols or Thomases. Although a generally pleasant character, Carol had moments of being catty with Elly; particularly when comparing her own kids, who did better academically than Michael and Elizabeth.

Dawn Enjo
She becomes Elizabeth's friend when her family moves into Connie Poirier's former home. She is a descendant of Japanese-Canadian immigrants. She becomes a graphic designer in Ottawa and marries David.

Keith Enjo
The patriarch of the Enjos; husband to Carol and father to Brian and Dawn. He had been into gardening. When once accused of being more Canadian than Japanese, Keith revealed growing up his immigrant parents faced bigotry and were hit in school for using Japanese words, causing Elizabeth to question her career, realizing that public schools had a history of indoctrination.

Gerald Forsythe / Delaney (both surnames were used in the strip)
April's boyfriend; also a member of the band 4Evah & Eva. He decides to forego university to become a full-time musician, and accepts Becky's offer to tour with her band for the summer. Gerald and April have many disagreements over such things as how he acts in front of the guys, Gerald's treatment of April's friend Shannon, and how she feels betrayed when he takes Becky's offer. Eventually, April concludes that the relationship cannot last and, at some point, breaks up with Gerald. When it is hinted in the epilogue of the strip that April is living in the countryside with an unnamed boyfriend, it is unlikely that the boyfriend is Gerald, because he had wanted to become famous as a musician.

Luis Guzman
Replaces Becky McGuire as the keyboard player for 4Evah after she leaves the band.

Jeremy Jones
Classmate of April. In elementary school, he mercilessly bullies her while she counters with an insulting song ("Wormy, germy Jeremy Jones"). The conflict culminates with an incident in 2000 where Jeremy tries to run April down in a bicycle chase, only to crash into an oncoming car and suffer severe injuries. Because April shows the compassion to stay and call for help, and is the only child to visit him in the hospital, they reach a truce, but tend to avoid each other afterwards.

Melville & Winnie Kelpfroth
They move into the apartment below Michael and Deanna's at Lovey Saltzman's property. He and his wife have no children and do not like the noise or clutter from the Patterson children, and bang a broom on the ceiling at any noise from upstairs. Damage done to the ceiling prompts Lovey Saltzman to begin eviction proceedings. Melville smokes a cigar despite the "No Smoking" clause in his tenancy agreement, which leads to the fire that destroys most of the building. After the fire, they are reported to be in "serious condition" and do not appear again in the strip between then and the final original strip in 2008.

Kortney Krelbutz
Former assistant at Elly's bookstore. April suspects Kortney of assisting in a burglary and is threatened by Kortney when she confronts her. Elly prefers to think well of Kortney and dismisses April's concerns. Moira fires Kortney while Elly is on holiday in Mexico, resulting in Elly having to confront facts such as Kortney embezzling bookstore money and covering it up by forging receipts to nonexistent charities. Kortney retaliates by filing a wrongful termination lawsuit against Elly. The suit is thrown out after it is revealed that Moira's and April's suspicions are correct and that Kortney has indeed been an accessory in a felony theft at the bookstore. A year after she is fired, John finds her working as a cashier at a grocery story while shopping.

Brad Luggsworth
A grade school classmate of Michael who bullies him in his elementary school days. Despite this, he has a soft spot for his hard-working mother. He significantly cleans up his act as an adult and becomes a policeman following an enlistment in the Royal Canadian Air Force. Brad investigates a felony theft at Elly's bookstore in the 2000s, at which Elly is surprised to see the mature and handsome young man that he has become, since she has last seen him as a boy bothering Michael. On Brad's official website biography, it is hinted that Brad's father was very abusive towards his wife, which traumatized the young Brad. His parents have since divorced, and his father is in jail. With some determination on his part and some encouragement from a kind police officer, Brad is inspired to be a better man than his father. He is now happily married to his wife, Lisa, and is the proud father of a young son and an infant daughter.

Laurie McLeod-Shabogesic
Laurie is a real person living in Northern Ontario, and Lynn put her in the strip as a teaching assistant who helped out at Liz's school on the reserve. Laurie's real-life husband, Perry, and son Falcon also collaborated with Johnston on the Mtigwaki series of strips.

Martha McRae
Michael's second girlfriend, whom he meets at summer camp. Following the summer's end, Martha and Michael end up in the same school, but problems arise when Martha is found to be very open about their summer romance. When Michael fails his first driving test, he blames it on Martha breaking off the relationship just before the test, when she has been asked out by another boy. Though Michael is heartbroken, he realizes he has gotten over the breakup rather quickly. When high school graduation looms, Gordon, who is a friend of Martha's, tells Michael that she has regretted breaking up with Michael, and that she should never have left him. In later years, Martha is a divorced mother of twin girls who still live in Ontario, working for a business near Michael's office. Martha and Michael would have a much better relationship in their adult years, sometimes meeting together for lunch at work. Michael also takes advantage of his fiction writing to outline an alternate timeline in which he marries Martha, speculating on what their life together might have been like.

Jesse Mukwa
A Native Canadian student in Elizabeth's school class at the Ojibwa reserve in Mtigwaki. It is he who brings Elizabeth the abandoned kitten she names Shiimsha (the Ojibwe word for 'little animal friend'.)

The New Bentwood Rockers
A jazz band of senior musicians assembled by Jim at the retirement home where he lives. Years earlier, while living in Vancouver, he had formed an earlier band known as the Bentwood Rockers.

Anne Nichols
The Pattersons' longtime neighbour. For years a housewife and babysitter, in later years she manages the food and catering services at Milborough's Empire Hotel. A close confidante of Elly in the early years of the strip, she begins to appear less often, in part because of her perpetually rocky marriage, partly modeled after Johnston's first marriage, which ended in divorce. Anne confronts her husband Steve with her suspicions that he is having an affair: he confesses and ends the affair. Though she is obviously hurt, Anne stays with Steve because she does not believe in divorce. In her biography on the official website, she gives Steve a warning that if he slips up again, she is prepared to leave him and take the children. The Nicholses have three children: Christopher, who is about the same age as Elizabeth, Richard, about three years younger and the first birth to appear in the strip, and Leah, who is best remembered for having been born with six fingers on each hand. Anne's children have all grown up and her son Christopher is now married. While her marriage is not ideal, she is still happy with her husband. Leah becomes a biker in Europe and suffers a bicycle accident, though not with serious injuries. Now she and Steve are known to bike together.

Dennis North
A friend of Lawrence and Nicholas. He is Elizabeth's escort to Anthony's wedding and to a New Year's Eve party at Gord and Tracey's house. Although Dennis claims to be homosexual, he may still be heteroromantic as he confides to Elizabeth his feelings for her when he is her date to the wedding.

Kevin Smythe
A surgeon who recruits Deanna for a six-month medical mission to Honduras after she graduates from university in 1999. Michael Patterson is worried that Deanna is going to find interest in him (like Connie Poirier and Pablo da Silva), but Kevin is already happily married to a woman named June.

Mira Sobinski (named Eva in her earliest appearances)
Deanna's mother, portrayed as obnoxious and overbearing, although she confesses to Lovey Saltzman that she only wants her children to have the best in life and the dream wedding that she herself had never had. She delights in her grandchildren, frequently bringing them new clothes, toys and furniture, despite Deanna's protestations. Often Mira dislikes Michael, being quoted saying to Deanna, "I'll say goodnight to you, but I'll ignore the man you chose to marry".

Wilfred Sobinski
Deanna's father; a hardware store owner. He is largely quiet, but at times can be forceful, such as when he bluntly orders his wife to quit worrying about Deanna and that his daughter and son-in-law are quite capable of handling their own problems without her helicopter parenting. When Michael kicks out Mira after her harping on him for having too small a place to support a second child, Wilfred sides with Michael and ushers Mira out.

Carleen Stein
"Weed's" long-time photographic assistant, later his girlfriend.

Greg Thomas
Connie's second husband, and father of Gayle and Molly. Connie meets Greg while living in Thunder Bay and, after dating for several months, proposes to him. Greg works for a bank and is transferred to Milborough where he and Connie buy Thelma Baird's former house next door to the Pattersons' home. He is first seen being introduced at a housewarming party, where the Pattersons privately confide that Greg is a nice man who is a good father figure to Lawrence; a relief from the deadbeat dad in Brazil who abandoned Connie after getting her pregnant with Lawrence in a one-night stand. Gayle and Molly move to Milborough with their father and stepmother, but have a difficult relationship with their stepmother and both girls disappear from the strip; it is later said that Gayle has become a midwife, married an American man and moved to the US with Molly leaving Milborough years earlier to live with her mother in Thunder Bay. When Lawrence admits he was gay as a teenager, Greg throws him out of the house, much to Connie's shock and horror. The following day, he reconsiders and allows his stepson back, accepting and respecting his homosexuality. Greg was seen much later in the strip, where he is talking to John about considering retiring from banking and buying a house in Florida to focus on his main hobby, golf.

Molly Thomas
Greg's younger daughter, a stepdaughter to Connie and stepsister to Lawrence. Two story arcs centre around Molly; the first being her moodiness in adjusting to her father's remarriage and resisting Connie's attempts to bond with her, to which Elly attempts to guide Connie. A second story has Lawrence telling Brian, Gordon and Michael how to spy on Molly through a tree while she is in her underwear. This results in Michael being caught by Molly while Brian and Gordon manage to get away. An enraged Elly reads Michael the riot act for spying on women in their underwear and demands John punish Michael, but John confides in Elly that he cannot be too hard on Michael for hypocrisy on account of him doing the same action at Michael's age. Molly and Gayle spend most of their teenage years giving Connie a hard time as their stepmother. In Connie's biography on the official website, both girls have calmed down during adulthood. They have each married and have children of their own. Both Molly and Gayle accept Connie now more as their children's grandmother.

Shawna-Marie Verano
An African-Dominican high school classmate of Elizabeth. It is her wedding in Summer 2007 that sets the stage for Elizabeth and Anthony's reunion as a couple.

Paul Wright
A policeman with family in Mtigwaki and Elizabeth's last boyfriend before her marriage to Anthony. When Elly falls asleep on the drive home to Milborough, Paul and his partner let her spend the night at the police station. Elly shows Paul a large glossy photograph of Elizabeth and, when he discovers that Elly has forgotten her sunglasses at the police station, Paul decides to return them to Mtigwaki as an excuse to meet Elizabeth. Elly immediately thinks of him as "Mr. (W)Right". Paul and Elizabeth are shown in a loving, close relationship, which ends when Elizabeth returns to Mtigwaki a day earlier than expected. She finds out that Paul has been cheating on her with Susan Dokis, his childhood friend and the teacher who has replaced Elizabeth after her decision not to renew her teaching contract. On the official website, besides his infidelity with Susan, it is hinted that Paul has become distant with her out of jealousy of her close friendship with Anthony.

Ben
Lawrence's boyfriend. He is seen only once in the strip at Lawrence's high school graduation. He later leaves for Paris to study piano at Le Conservatoire and Lawrence decides to end the relationship.

== Pets ==
=== Dogs ===
Farley
An Old English Sheepdog, the Pattersons' first family dog. A runt from the last litter of Thelma Baird's dog Lily, Elly feels sorry for the puppy and adopts him. Farley grows up alongside Michael and Elizabeth, later siring a litter of his own with neighbour Connie Thomas's dog Sera, including his son, Edgar. After rescuing April from the creek near the Pattersons' home, keeping her head above the surface, Farley dies in the moments afterwards after being pulled from the water and praised by John. The family's veterinarian diagnosed that the death was due to the shock of the cold water and overexertion, combined with his superannuated age, resulted in cardiac arrest.

Johnston named Farley for the Canadian author Farley Mowat due, in part, to the author's resemblance to the puppy. When Mowat confirmed with Johnston that he was the Patterson puppy's namesake, he requested and received an original strip in recompense. Mowat hung the strip above his toilet, "so the men would read it!"

Edgar
Old English Sheepdog/Labrador Retriever mixed breed, the Pattersons' second family dog, and offspring of Farley and Sera. Living solely with his sire as a weaned puppy, the rambunctious Edgar would sometimes vex Farley when the father was trying to nap undisturbed, sharing a silent understanding with Elly, who was dealing with a four-year-old April. He is part of April's rescue by running back to the house and barking to warn the family after his sire dives in and grabs hold of the girl. After Farley's heroic death, Edgar is promoted to the family dog position, and is at odds with the rabbit Mr. B from time to time. His name came from his deep "Errr...grrr" growl as a puppy. (Johnston often compares his character to Don Knotts)

Dixie
Shetland Sheepdog, the Pattersons' third family dog. Originally Grandpa Jim's dog, Elly takes her in after he moves into a senior residence. Dixie still misses Grandpa Jim, but has settled down into the Patterson home, taking the role as Edgar's devout follower – wherever he goes, whatever he does, she copies.

Sera
Labrador Retriever, the Poiriers' family dog. Connie adopts her as a puppy while waiting for the day when she would have grandchildren of her own to play with. After Lawrence's confession of being gay, Connie takes her husband's words to heart – "Que sera sera" – and names the puppy "Sera". April unknowingly lets the dog loose when she is in heat, and she becomes pregnant by Farley. Sera gives birth to a litter of puppies, one of them adopted by the Pattersons and named Edgar. Her current status is unknown, although given the linear timeline of the strip, she is most likely deceased.

Lily
Old English Sheepdog, Thelma Baird's dog and Farley's mother. From her last litter, the Pattersons adopt the runt – as Thelma called him – and name him Farley. Shortly after Farley's adoption, Lily dies of old age, contributing slightly to Thelma's move into a seniors' complex.

=== Rabbits ===
Mr. B
Elizabeth and April Patterson's large white rabbit. He gets his name from April when no one has given him one and he needs one because "if he got lost how would he know who he is?". When staying with relatives at their farm in Manitoba, they introduce her to one of their favorite rural pastimes, the auction, on which Elizabeth bids and wins a rabbit. When she returns home Elizabeth takes the rabbit with her. Michael names him for the jokes, and April takes responsibility over him when Elizabeth does not want the hassle. Mr. B is named Furgus by Becky McGuire because of how much fur he sheds. Mr. B is sometimes at odds with the family dogs. He enjoys chewing on telephone and electrical cords, often getting a shock in the process. Mr. B dies in April's arms in 2002.

Butterscotch
April Patterson's second rabbit, named for her colouring. After April's school friends find out that Mr. B has died, they inform her that a schoolmate has been looking for someone to take his pet rabbit. April adopts the rabbit and takes her home. Though more delicate than Mr. B, Butterscotch proves to be equally – or even more – full of mischief, has a bad habit of emptying her cage's wood chips onto the floor, and starts to get the hang of taking on the dogs as Mr. B once did. Butterscotch also falls in love with Elly's bunny slippers, either following Elly everywhere when she uses them, or "playing" with them when they are in the closet.

=== Other ===
Shiimsa
Elizabeth Patterson's cat. Though her breed is never clearly identified by the strip, many readers speculated she was a gray tabby mix. Discovered as a stray kitten by Elizabeth's student Jesse, he manipulates Elizabeth to take her in. Initially unreceptive to the expense, messes and shedding hair, Elizabeth comes to enjoy her cat. (Shiimsa, pronounced "SHEEM-sah", means "little animal friend" in a tribal Ojibwe language.) Shiimsa moves back to Milborough with Elizabeth but whether Shiimsa remains at the Patterson family home with the other pets or moves to Anthony's house after Elizabeth's marriage was not shown.

Ned Tanner
Not a person but a grinning, six-inch, anatomically correct figurine with bendable plastic limbs and suction cups. Josef "Weed" Weeder, a photographer who often works with Michael, regards "Ned" as his tongue-in-cheek mascot, as does Michael, and they keep him in the apartment they share when they are students together at the University of Western Ontario. Initially a naked man which annoys an old lady neighbour of theirs; Michael and Josef add a pair of swim trunks to Ned in an attempt to get her off their backs. When Weed falls in love with his assistant, Carleen Stein, he gives Ned to Carleen, to Michael's dismay, who demands him back as he feels that Weed does not value what Ned stands for: he is their 'futility symbol'. Meredith flushes Ned down the toilet, but his fate remains unknown until late November/early December 2006, when Robin flushes Michael's socks down the toilet. A plumber has to be called, and in unclogging the toilet, they find not only the socks but also Ned. As a result of this incident, Weed once again claims Ned.
