= Jackson County Jail (Andrew, Iowa) =

- U.S. National Register of Historic Places
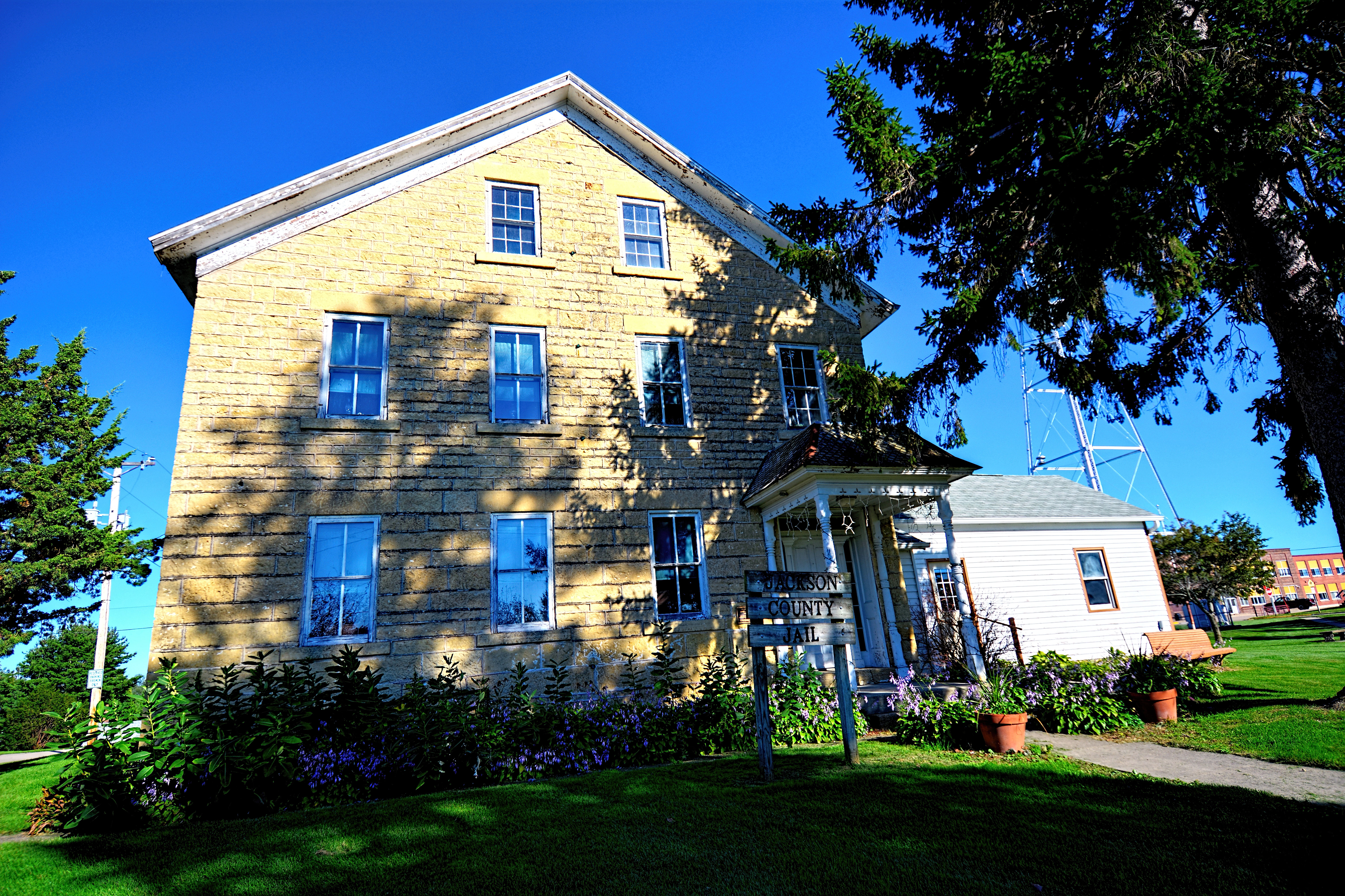

- Location within Iowa Location within the United States
- Location: Emmet St. Andrew, Iowa
- Coordinates: 42°09′13″N 90°35′31″W
- Area: less than one acre
- Built: 1871
- Built by: Strasser and Schlecht
- Architectural style: Vernacular
- MPS: Limestone Architecture of Jackson County MPS
- NRHP reference No.: 78001224
- Added to NRHP: December 12, 1978

The former Jackson County Jail, also known as the Andrew Jail, is a historic building located in Andrew, Iowa, United States. Built in 1871 by local contractors Strasser and Schlecht, this building is the only reminder that Andrew was at one time the county seat for Jackson County. The stone blocks were quarried locally and vary somewhat in shape and size. They were laid in courses, and the window sills and lintels are composed of flat stones. The structure is capped with a cross-gable roof. After the courthouse moved to Maquoketa in 1873 the jail remained here until 1896. After a new jail was built in Maquoketa, this building was primarily used as a residence. A couple of frame additions have been built onto the building. It was listed on the National Register of Historic Places in 1978.
