= Elizabeth Gregg Patterson =

Elizabeth Gregg Patterson (1904-1987) was an American short-story writer.

== Biography ==
Gregg was born in Newport, Arkansas on August 8, 1904, and lived there until attending Smith College from which she graduated in 1926.

She moved to New York City and soon after, her career as a writer of short fiction began. For two decades, her stories appeared in such magazines as Charm, Collier's, Cosmopolitan, The New Yorker, Atlantic Monthly, Saturday Evening Post and many more. Throughout her career, she was represented by Harold Ober Associates of New York City.

In 1942, Patterson became a Fellow, at the Bread Loaf Writers' Conference, Middlebury College, and later, her short story, "Homecoming", was awarded third prize in the 1951 O. Henry Award for short fiction.

She married Kenneth C. Patterson in 1930, and moved to Saginaw, Michigan, where she did much of her published writing. Elizabeth was devoted to Newport and had many relatives in that area. She returned there often. As the market for short fiction began to wane, she retired from writing in the late 1950s and divided her time and interests between world travel and living in Ann Arbor, Michigan.

In 1983, Patterson suffered a debilitating stroke and soon after, her son, J. David Patterson, relocated Elizabeth to Key West, Florida, where he and his wife owned a sportfishing charter business. She died on March 15, 1987, in Key West, and was buried in the Gregg family plot in Newport. Following her death, the Newport Billingsley Memorial Library set aside a section dedicated to the display of a collection of her work, including many original magazines and telegrams from her agent, Dorothy Olding and Harold Ober, informing her of the sale of a story.

Included among her literary friends were Wallace Stegner, Theodore Roethke, Norman Cousins.
