= New Home School Building =

- U.S. National Register of Historic Places
- Location within Arkansas Location within the United States
- Nearest city: Swifton, Arkansas
- Coordinates: 35°50′38″N 91°10′24″W
- Area: less than one acre
- Built: 1915
- Architectural style: Plain Traditional
- NRHP reference No.: 92001357
- Added to NRHP: October 8, 1992

The New Home School Building is a historic school building in rural Jackson County, Arkansas. Located on the north side of County Road 69, northwest of Swifton, it is a small single-story vernacular wood-frame building, with a gable roof and a Craftsman-style front porch on its southern facade. The school was built c. 1915 as one of six rural single-room schoolhouses in the area surrounding Swifton, and is the best-preserved survivor of the group.

The building was listed on the National Register of Historic Places in 1992.

== See also ==
- National Register of Historic Places listings in Jackson County, Arkansas
