= New Home School and Church =

Historic church in Arkansas, United States

- U.S. National Register of Historic Places
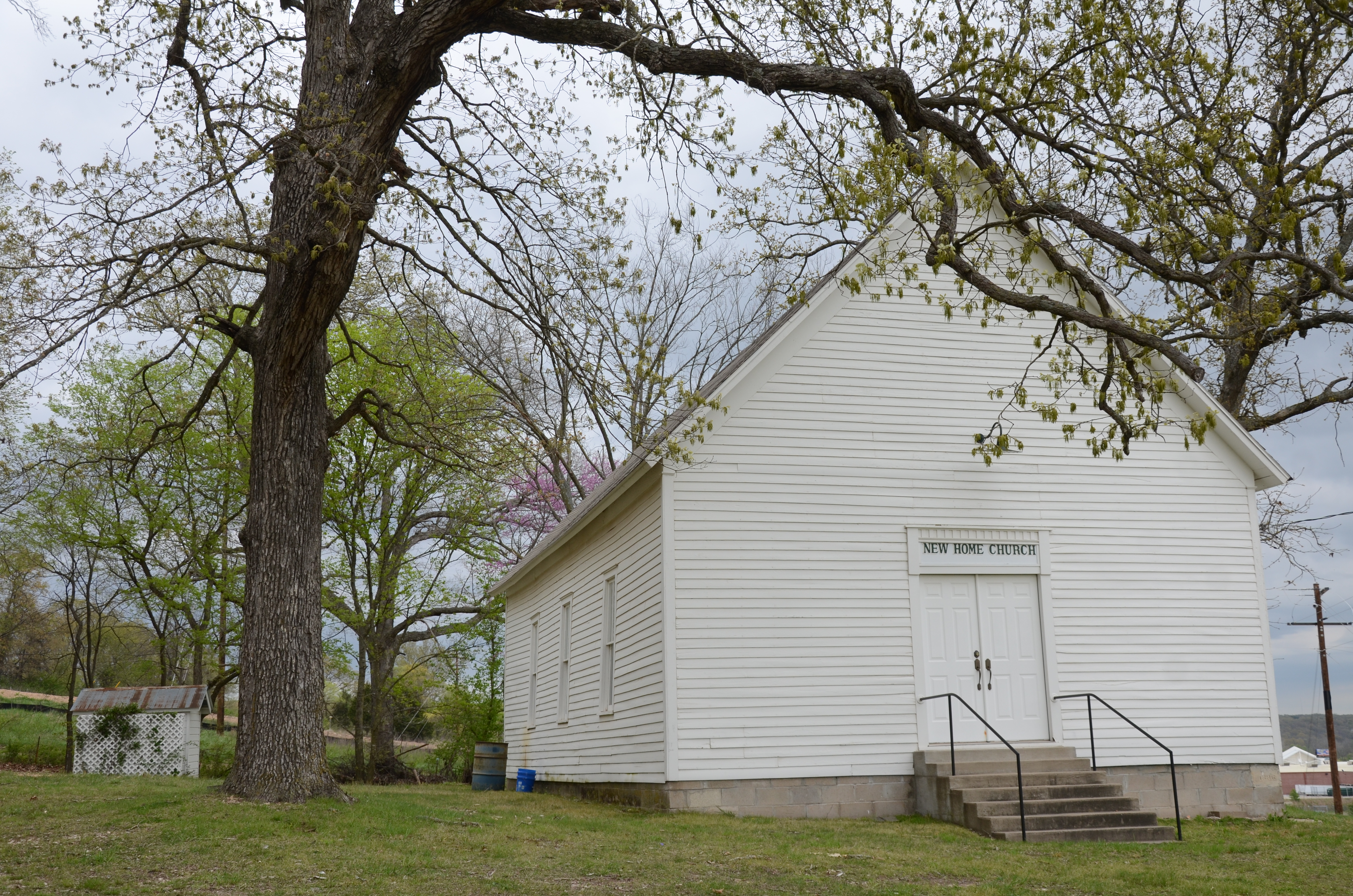

- Location within Arkansas Location within the United States
- Nearest city: Bella Vista, Arkansas
- Coordinates: 36°24′53″N 94°13′42″W
- Area: less than one acre
- Built: 1900
- MPS: Benton County MRA
- NRHP reference No.: 87002357
- Added to NRHP: January 28, 1988

The New Home School and Church is a historic community building on McKisic Creek Road south of Bella Vista, Arkansas. It is a modest single-story wood-frame structure, with a gable roof, which lacks ornamentation. Its main facade has a double-door entrance, and the side facades have three bays of windows. Built c. 1900, it is a well-preserved example of a multifunction vernacular community building, which was used as a school during the week and as a church on Sundays. The school function was discontinued after schools in the area were consolidated.

It appears to have functioned as a one-room schoolhouse.

The building was listed on the National Register of Historic Places in 1988.

== See also ==
- National Register of Historic Places listings in Benton County, Arkansas
