= Jackson County Jail (Newport, Arkansas) =

- Formerly listed on the U.S. National Register of Historic Places
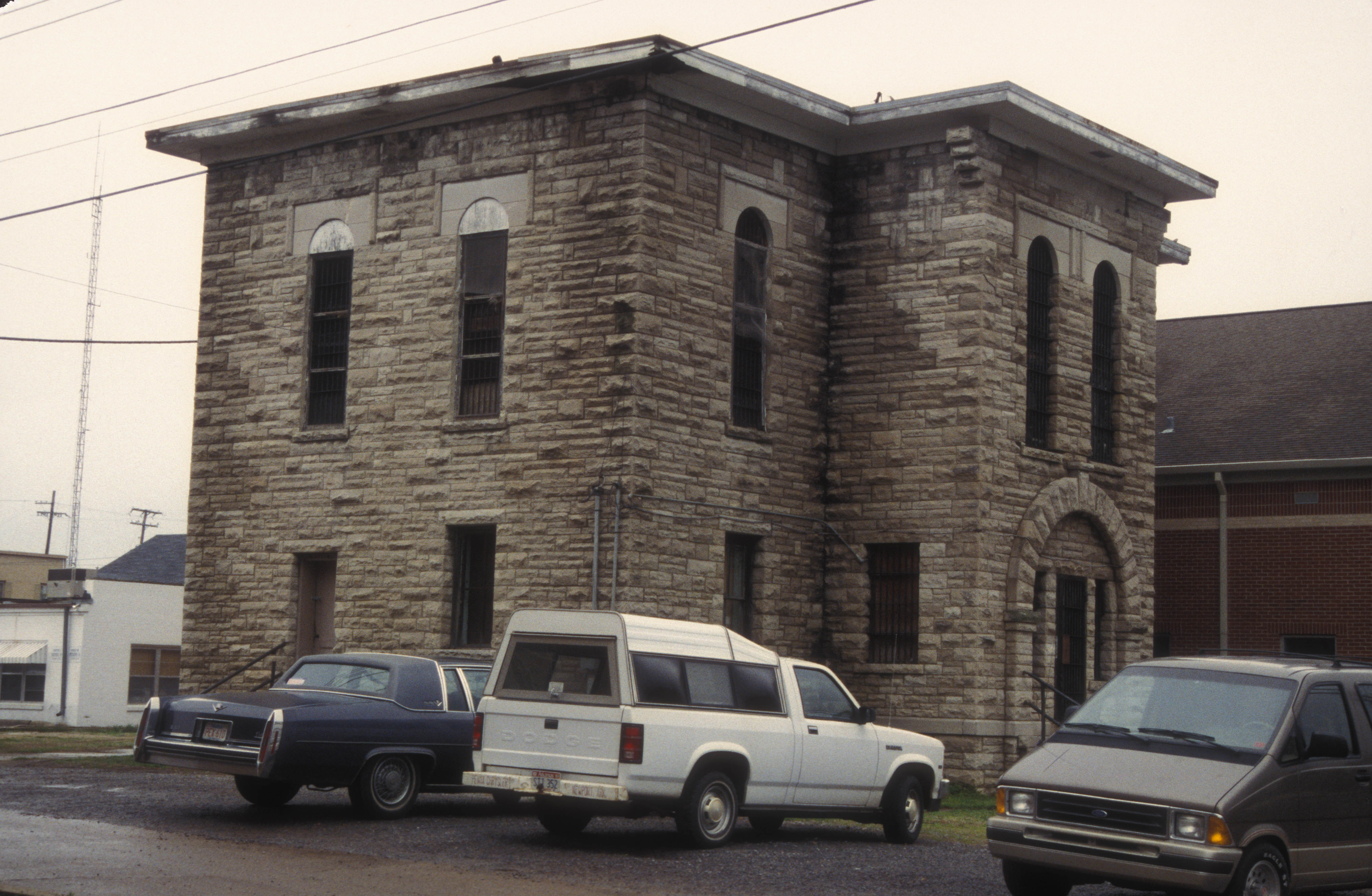

- Location within Arkansas Location within the United States
- Location: 503 3rd St., Newport, Arkansas
- Coordinates: 35°36′17″N 91°16′56″W
- Built: 1905
- Architectural style: Romanesque
- NRHP reference No.: 79003432

Significant dates
- Added to NRHP: August 10, 1979
- Removed from NRHP: September 29, 2006

Jackson County Jail in Newport, Arkansas was built in 1905. It was listed on the National Register of Historic Places in 1979.

It was delisted on September 20, 2006.
