= Elizabeth Akua-Nyarko Patterson =

Ghanaian social entrepreneur

Elizabeth Akua Nyarko Patterson
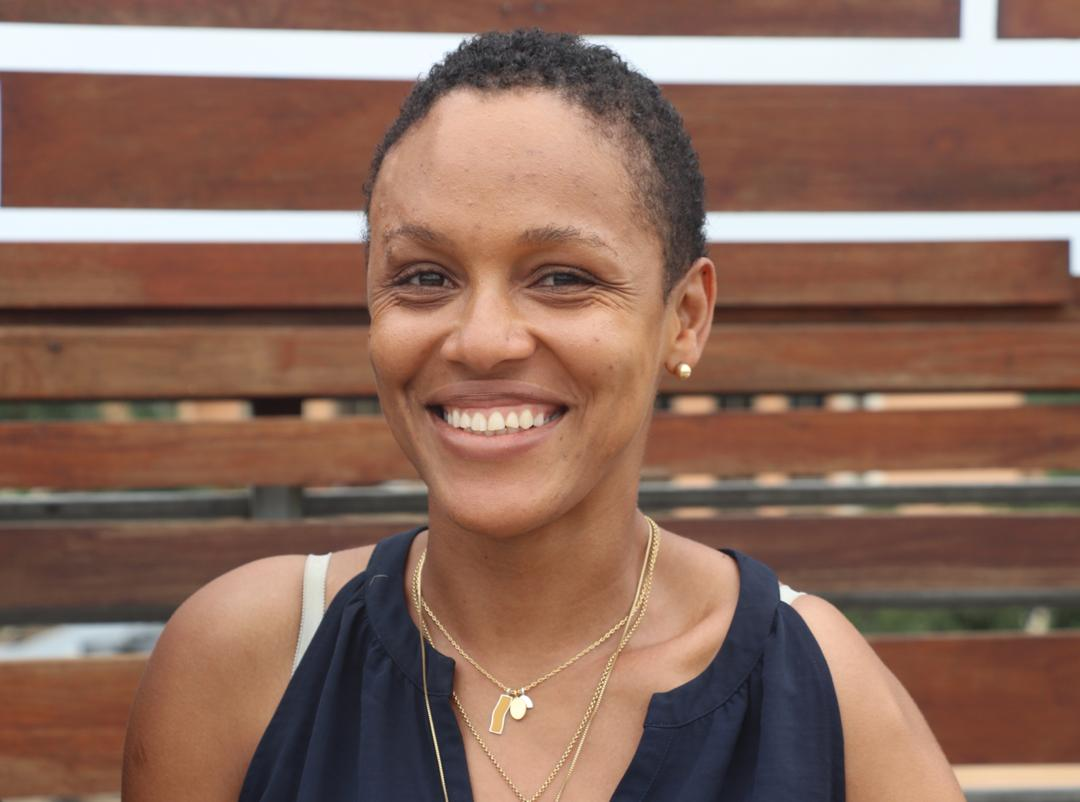
- The Founder & Director of GEIG
- Born: Elizabeth Akua Nyarko Patterson; January 2, 1985 (age 41)
- Occupation: Social Entrepreneur
- Website: girlsedgh.org

Elizabeth Akua Nyarko Patterson (born 1985) is a Ghanaian social entrepreneur and the founder and executive director of the non-profit organization Girls Education Initiative of Ghana (GEIG).

== Early life and education ==
Patterson was born in 1985 in Kumasi in the Ashanti Region, Ghana. Her family moved to America in 1995 and she attended school there. When she was in her final year in high school, she was involved in a motor vehicle accident in which she suffered a traumatic brain injury which affected her cognitive and intellectual abilities, and also left her with a physical disability. She completed high school while recovering in hospital. She holds a BA in Political Science and Business Management from Caldwell College, and a Masters in Public Administration from the New York University Wagner School of Public Service.

== Career ==
Patterson worked as a communications and marketing associate at Junior Achievement in New York. After returning to Ghana in 2006, she was a volunteer teacher at the World Links Academy in Kumasi, and then director of communication and marketing for the Council of Young African Leaders. She experienced more difficulty accessing public facilities in Africa than she had in America. She also observed that a student at Kumasi who had learning difficulties was believed to be affected by evil spirits.

These experiences inspired her to found the Girls Education Initiative of Ghana (GEIG) in 2013, to provide support for disadvantaged girls, particularly those with special needs, to attend school. GEIG supports girls in the Ashanti and Greater Accra regions, and has assisted over thirty girls to attend and complete school from the basic level through to the tertiary level. Patterson was named Vlisco Ambassador in 2015, because "despite all that had happened in her life, she has proven that disability is not inability. She has strong values and a big dream of ensuring all girls and women have equal footing in Ghana". She has been a TedxAccra speaker.
