= Weldon, Arkansas =

- Town
- Location of Weldon in Jackson County, Arkansas.
- Coordinates: 35°26′53″N 91°13′54″W
- Country: United States
- State: Arkansas
- County: Jackson

Area
  - Total: 0.24 sq mi (0.63 km^{2})
  - Land: 0.24 sq mi (0.63 km^{2})
  - Water: 0 sq mi (0.00 km^{2})
- Elevation: 223 ft (68 m)

Population (2020)
  - Total: 57
  - Estimate (2025): 59 ▲
  - Density: 233.4/sq mi (90.12/km^{2})
- Time zone: UTC-6 (Central (CST))
  - Summer (DST): UTC-5 (CDT)
- ZIP code: 72112
- Area code: 870
- FIPS code: 05-74000
- GNIS feature ID: 2406854

Weldon is a town in Jackson County, Arkansas, United States. As of the 2020 census, Weldon had a population of 57.

== Geography ==
According to the United States Census Bureau, the town has a total area of 0.27 square miles (0.7 km^{2}), all land.

== Demographics ==
Historical population
Census	Pop.	Note	%±
1970	133		—
1980	161		21.1%
1990	106		−34.2%
2000	100		−5.7%
2010	75		−25.0%
2020	57		−24.0%
2025 (est.)	59	▲	3.5%
U.S. Decennial Census

As of the census of 2000, there were 100 people, 44 households, and 27 families residing in the town. The population density was 148.5/km^{2} (383.9/mi^{2}). There were 54 housing units at an average density of 80.2/km^{2} (207.3/mi^{2}). The racial makeup of the town was 95.00% White, 2.00% Black or African American, 1.00% from other races, and 2.00% from two or more races. 1.00% of the population were Hispanic or Latino of any race.

There were 44 households, out of which 36.4% had children under the age of 18 living with them, 45.5% were married couples living together, 11.4% had a female householder with no husband present, and 38.6% were non-families. 36.4% of all households were made up of individuals, and 18.2% had someone living alone who was 65 years of age or older. The average household size was 2.27 and the average family size was 3.00.

In the town, the population was spread out, with 27.0% under the age of 18, 6.0% from 18 to 24, 21.0% from 25 to 44, 28.0% from 45 to 64, and 18.0% who were 65 years of age or older. The median age was 44 years. For every 100 females, there were 104.1 males. For every 100 females age 18 and over, there were 92.1 males.

The median income for a household in the town was $27,188, and the median income for a family was $56,250. Males had a median income of $29,167 versus $18,750 for females. The per capita income for the town was $20,161. There were no families and 6.2% of the population living below the poverty line, including no one under eighteens and 9.5% of those over 64.

== History ==
Weldon was originally a station on the Batesville & Brinkley Railroad, a narrow-gauge line which operated between Brinkley and Newport, Arkansas. The railroad eventually became part of the Rock Island Railroad and was abandoned in 1940. The Weldon Rock Island depot survived another 50 years after the railroad's demise, and on June 11, 1992, was added to the National Register of Historic Places. The depot eventually succumbed to old age and neglect and the property was delisted from the Register on September 25, 2012.

== Education ==
It is in the Newport School District.
