= Newport, Arkansas =

- City
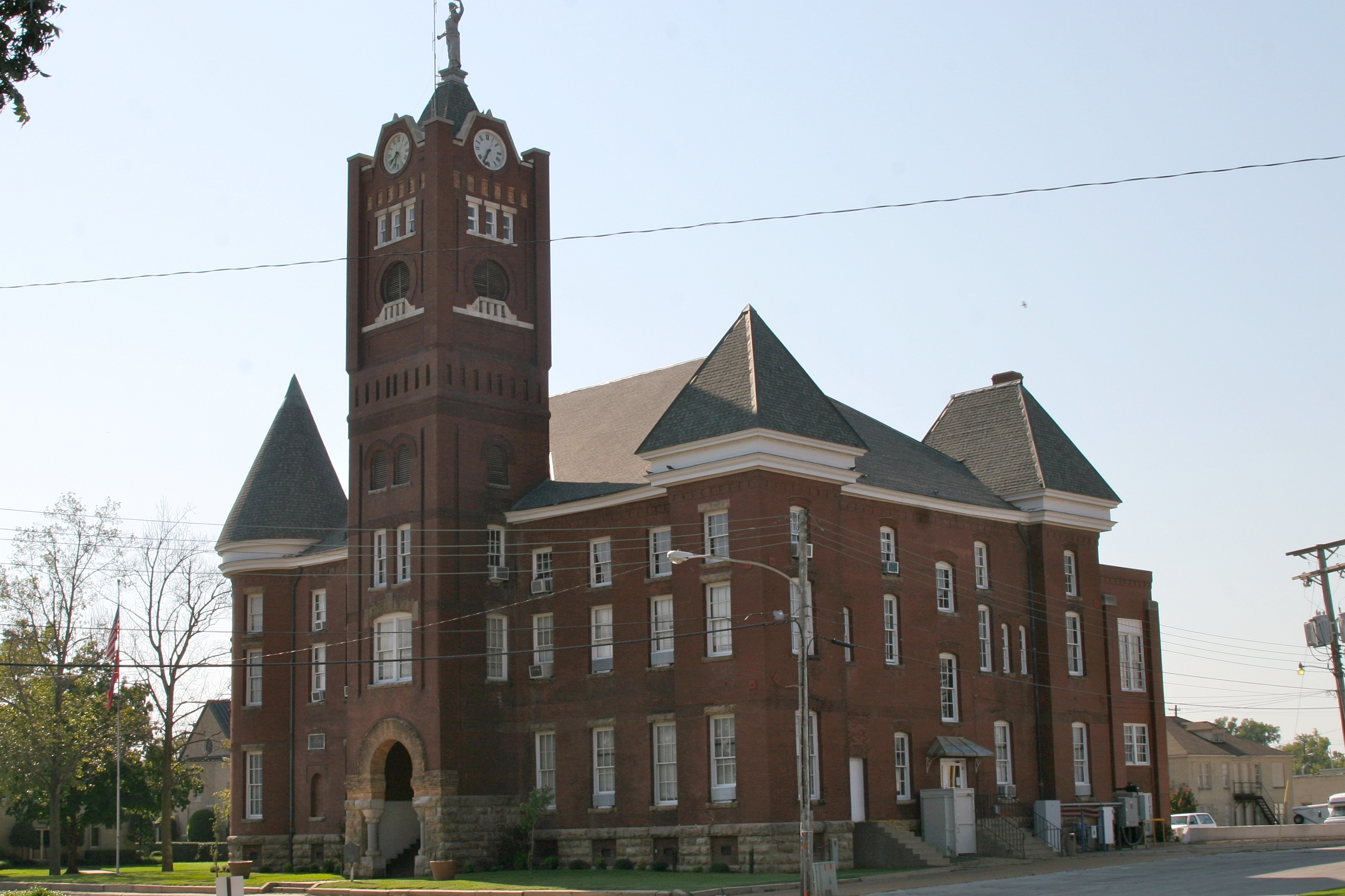
- Current Jackson County Courthouse in Newport

- Flag Logo

- Location of Newport in Jackson County, Arkansas.
- Coordinates: 35°36′43″N 91°15′44″W
- Country: United States
- State: Arkansas
- County: Jackson
- Established: 1870

Government
  - Mayor: Derrick Ratliffe

Area
  - Total: 13.80 sq mi (35.75 km^{2})
  - Land: 13.55 sq mi (35.10 km^{2})
  - Water: 0.25 sq mi (0.66 km^{2})
- Elevation: 233 ft (71 m)

Population (2020)
  - Total: 8,005
  - Estimate (2025): 8,193 ▲
  - Density: 590.7/sq mi (228.08/km^{2})
- Time zone: UTC−06:00 (Central (CST))
  - Summer (DST): UTC−05:00 (CDT)
- ZIP Code: 72112
- Area code: 870
- FIPS code: 05-49580
- GNIS feature ID: 2404372
- Website: www.newportarcity.org

Newport is a city in and the county seat of Jackson County, Arkansas, United States located on the White River, 84 miles (135 km) northeast of Little Rock. As of the 2020 census, Newport had a population of 8,005.

Newport is home to a campus of the Arkansas State University system, with particular focus on training in transportation careers. Newport is known as the town in which Sam Walton owned a Ben Franklin store prior to starting Walmart.

Newport has ten properties listed on the National Register of Historic Places.

== Geography ==
According to the United States Census Bureau, the city has a total area of 13.7 square miles (35.5 km^{2}), of which 13.4 square miles (34.8 km^{2}) is land and 0.27 square miles (0.7 km^{2}), or 1.92%, is water.

=== Climate ===
The climate in this area is characterized by hot, humid summers and generally mild to cool winters. According to the Köppen Climate Classification system, Newport has a humid subtropical climate, abbreviated "Cfa" on climate maps.

Climate data for Newport, Arkansas (1991–2020 normals, extremes 1884–present)
Month	Jan	Feb	Mar	Apr	May	Jun	Jul	Aug	Sep	Oct	Nov	Dec	Year
Record high °F (°C)	79 (26)	85 (29)	96 (36)	97 (36)	107 (42)	108 (42)	112 (44)	114 (46)	109 (43)	98 (37)	87 (31)	80 (27)	114 (46)
Mean maximum °F (°C)	66.7 (19.3)	71.8 (22.1)	78.2 (25.7)	84.1 (28.9)	89.2 (31.8)	94.8 (34.9)	97.3 (36.3)	98.2 (36.8)	93.9 (34.4)	87.2 (30.7)	77.4 (25.2)	67.9 (19.9)	99.3 (37.4)
Mean daily maximum °F (°C)	45.7 (7.6)	50.7 (10.4)	59.8 (15.4)	70.0 (21.1)	78.2 (25.7)	86.4 (30.2)	89.4 (31.9)	88.9 (31.6)	82.6 (28.1)	72.0 (22.2)	58.8 (14.9)	48.7 (9.3)	69.3 (20.7)
Daily mean °F (°C)	37.7 (3.2)	41.9 (5.5)	50.6 (10.3)	60.4 (15.8)	69.3 (20.7)	77.6 (25.3)	80.7 (27.1)	79.4 (26.3)	72.4 (22.4)	61.1 (16.2)	49.6 (9.8)	40.8 (4.9)	60.1 (15.6)
Mean daily minimum °F (°C)	29.6 (−1.3)	33.2 (0.7)	41.4 (5.2)	50.8 (10.4)	60.4 (15.8)	68.8 (20.4)	72.0 (22.2)	70.0 (21.1)	62.2 (16.8)	50.2 (10.1)	40.4 (4.7)	32.9 (0.5)	51.0 (10.6)
Mean minimum °F (°C)	14.6 (−9.7)	18.5 (−7.5)	25.2 (−3.8)	36.8 (2.7)	47.1 (8.4)	59.1 (15.1)	64.1 (17.8)	61.5 (16.4)	49.2 (9.6)	36.1 (2.3)	26.6 (−3.0)	19.4 (−7.0)	11.4 (−11.4)
Record low °F (°C)	−12 (−24)	−14 (−26)	1 (−17)	27 (−3)	30 (−1)	46 (8)	51 (11)	46 (8)	35 (2)	25 (−4)	11 (−12)	−17 (−27)	−17 (−27)
Average precipitation inches (mm)	3.67 (93)	3.96 (101)	5.01 (127)	5.39 (137)	5.59 (142)	3.37 (86)	4.18 (106)	2.97 (75)	3.23 (82)	3.96 (101)	4.93 (125)	4.93 (125)	51.19 (1,300)
Average snowfall inches (cm)	0.8 (2.0)	0.9 (2.3)	0.7 (1.8)	0.0 (0.0)	0.0 (0.0)	0.0 (0.0)	0.0 (0.0)	0.0 (0.0)	0.0 (0.0)	0.0 (0.0)	0.0 (0.0)	0.2 (0.51)	2.6 (6.6)
Average precipitation days (≥ 0.01 in)	9.5	8.9	10.4	10.0	10.2	7.7	8.2	7.3	6.6	8.2	9.0	9.7	105.7
Average snowy days (≥ 0.1 in)	0.5	0.6	0.2	0.0	0.0	0.0	0.0	0.0	0.0	0.0	0.0	0.2	1.5
Source: NOAA

== Demographics ==
Historical population
Census	Pop.	Note	%±
1880	683		—
1890	1,571		130.0%
1900	2,866		82.4%
1910	3,557		24.1%
1920	3,771		6.0%
1930	4,547		20.6%
1940	4,301		−5.4%
1950	6,254		45.4%
1960	7,007		12.0%
1970	7,725		10.2%
1980	8,339		7.9%
1990	7,459		−10.6%
2000	7,811		4.7%
2010	7,879		0.9%
2020	8,005		1.6%
2025 (est.)	8,193	▲	2.3%
U.S. Decennial Census

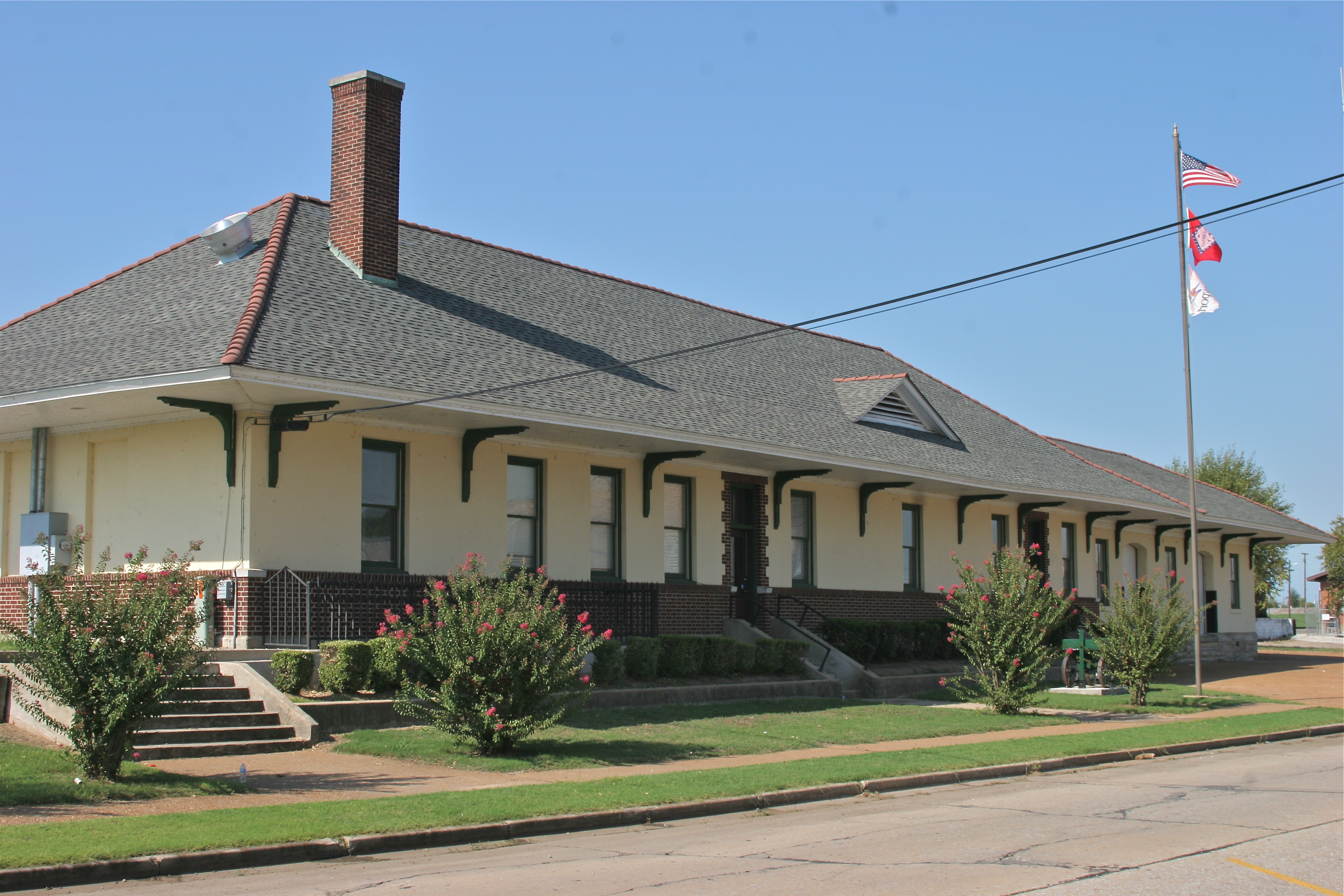
Newport's Missouri Pacific Depot is listed on the National Register of Historic Places

=== 2020 census ===
As of the 2020 census, Newport had a population of 8,005. The median age was 39.0 years. 16.8% of residents were under the age of 18 and 16.2% of residents were 65 years of age or older. For every 100 females there were 92.8 males, and for every 100 females age 18 and over there were 90.7 males age 18 and over.

67.1% of residents lived in urban areas, while 32.9% lived in rural areas.

There were 2,534 households in Newport, of which 28.2% had children under the age of 18 living in them. Of all households, 34.1% were married-couple households, 21.3% were households with a male householder and no spouse or partner present, and 38.9% were households with a female householder and no spouse or partner present. About 37.7% of all households were made up of individuals and 16.6% had someone living alone who was 65 years of age or older. There were 1,234 families residing in the city.

There were 2,915 housing units, of which 13.1% were vacant. The homeowner vacancy rate was 2.7% and the rental vacancy rate was 10.7%.

Newport racial composition
Race	Number	Percentage
White (non-Hispanic)	5,142	64.23%
Black or African American (non-Hispanic)	2,220	27.73%
Native American	22	0.27%
Asian	57	0.71%
Pacific Islander	1	0.01%
Other/Mixed	288	3.6%
Hispanic or Latino	275	3.44%

=== 2000 census ===
As of the census of 2000, the city's residents comprised 7,811 people in 2,690 households 1,702 families. The population density was 599.2 inhabitants per square mile (231.4/km^{2}). There were 3,118 housing units at an average density of 239.2 per square mile (92.4/km^{2}). The racial makeup of the city was 56.57% White, 41.76% Black or African American, 0.27% Native American, 0.33% Asian, 0.01% Pacific Islander, 0.28% from other races, and 0.77% from two or more races. 1.13% of the population were Hispanic or Latino of any race.

There were 2,690 households, out of which 26.2% had children under the age of 18 living with them, 42.5% were married couples living together, 17.5% had a female householder with no husband present, and 36.7% were non-families. 33.2% of all households were made up of individuals, and 17.9% had someone living alone who was 65 years of age or older. The average household size was 2.29 and the average family size was 2.90.

19.6% of the population were under the age of 18, 16.7% from 18 to 24, 24.9% from 25 to 44, 20.9% from 45 to 64, and 17.9% 65 years of age or older. The median age was 37 years. For every 100 females, there were 84.9 males. For every 100 females age 18 and over, there were 78.9 males.

The median income for a household in the city was $26,853, and the median per capita income was $13,867. About 23.6% of families and 28.1% of the population were below the poverty line, including 40.6% of those under age 18 and 17.5% of those age 65 or over.

== Government and infrastructure ==
The Grimes Unit and the McPherson Unit, prisons of the Arkansas Department of Correction, are located in Newport, off Arkansas Highway 384, 4 miles (6 km) east of central Newport. The prison houses the state's death row for women.

The United States Postal Service operates the Newport Post Office.

== Economy ==
- Medallion Foods, snack-food producer

== Education ==
=== Elementary and secondary education ===
Newport is supported with public education from the Newport School District, including Newport High School.

=== Postsecondary education ===
The main campus of the two-year community college, Arkansas State University-Newport is located here.

== Notable people ==
=== Commerce ===
- Helen Walton, wife of Sam Walton
- Sam Walton, founder of Wal-Mart
- S. Robson Walton, John T. Walton, Jim Walton and Alice Walton, children of the Wal-Mart founder

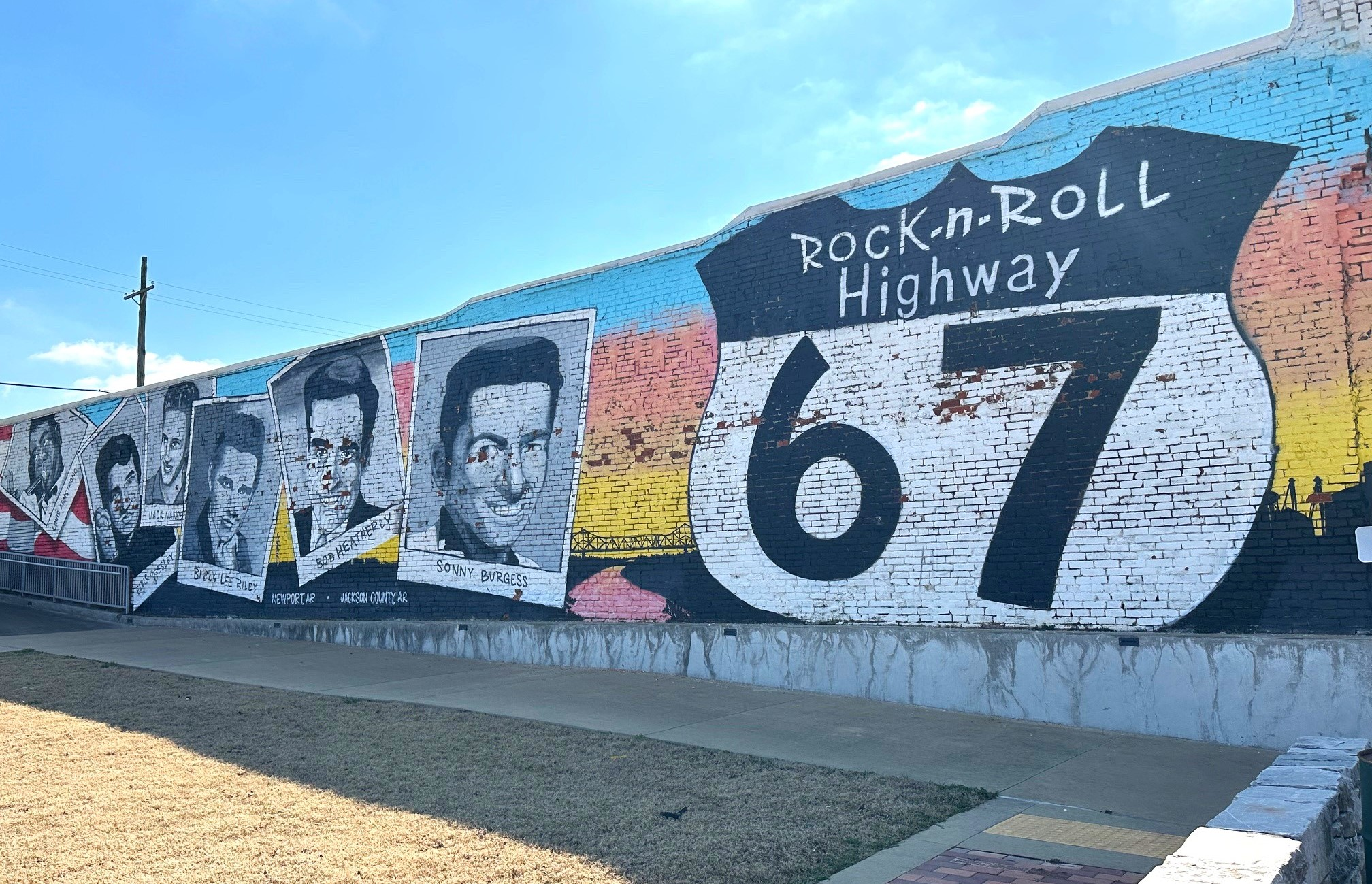
Rock-n-Roll Highway 67 mural w/Sonny Burgess, Newport AR, 2-2025

=== Entertainment and literature ===
- Sonny Burgess, rockabilly artist and a member of Rockabilly Hall of Fame
- Elizabeth Gregg Patterson, short fiction writer
- Mary Steenburgen, Academy Award-winning actress

=== Politics, military, and education ===
- Mike Beebe, former governor of Arkansas
- Les Eaves, member of the Arkansas House of Representatives from White County; businessman in Newport
- Kaneaster Hodges Jr., appointed to succeed John McClellan as United States Senator upon McClellan's death in 1977
- Paul K. Holmes III, federal judge
- Ed Madden, activist, poet, and professor at the University of South Carolina
- J. Fred Parish, Arkansas state senator from 1933 to 1937
- Admiral Charles Ray, Vice Commandant of the U.S. Coast Guard
- Harmon L. Remmel, Republican party boss in the early 20th century
- Martha Shoffner, Treasurer of the State of Arkansas from 2007 to 2013
- Robert L. Stanton, born and raised in Newport; he became a dentist and in 1932 the first African American to be elected to the Indiana State House on the Democratic Party ticket, serving two terms
- Dwight Tosh, member of the Arkansas House of Representatives from Jonesboro; former Newport resident and former state police officer
- Jim Wood, Arkansas State Auditor from 2003 to 2011

=== Spirituality ===
- Auntie Caroline Dye, prominent Hoodoo conjurer and businesswoman

=== Sports ===
- Dowell Loggains, NFL offensive coordinator, New York Jets
- Julius Pruitt, played for NFL's Miami Dolphins
- Theo Young, played one season with NFL's Pittsburgh Steelers and is a college football coach

== See also ==
- Jackson County Courthouse (Arkansas)
