= Tornado outbreak of March 14–16, 2025 =

Tornado outbreak in the United States

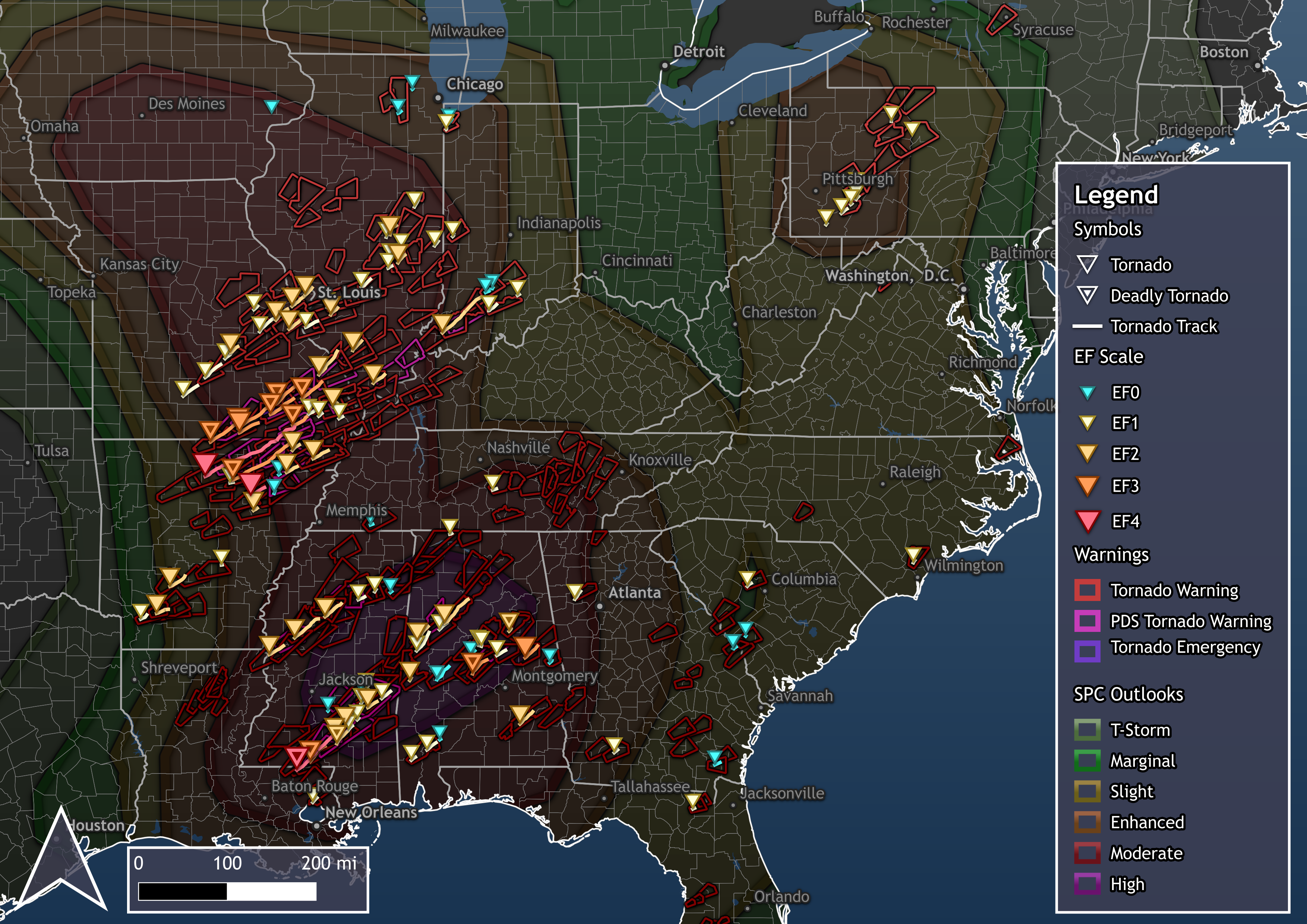
- Map of confirmed tornadoes and tornado warnings during the outbreak

Meteorological history
- Duration: March 14–16, 2025

Tornado outbreak
- Tornadoes: 118 (Record for largest outbreak in March)
- Max. rating: EF4 tornado
- Duration: 1 day, 23 hours, 48 minutes
- Highest winds: Tornadic – 190 mph (310 km/h) (Diaz, Arkansas EF4 on March 14)
- Highest gusts: Non-tornadic – 95 mph (153 km/h) in the San Augustin Pass on March 14
- Largest hail: 2.75 in (7.0 cm) – 3 different locations in Missouri, Kentucky and Georgia on March 14 and 15

Extratropical cyclone
- Lowest pressure: 975 hPa (mbar); 28.79 inHg
- Max. rainfall: 7.84 inches (199 mm) near Frankewing, Tennessee
- Max. snowfall: 32 in (81 cm) near Bear Valley, California

Overall effects
- Fatalities: 44 total (24 tornadic, 20 non-tornadic)
- Injuries: 247+ total (65+ tornadic, 182+ non-tornadic)
- Damage: $11 billion (2025 USD) (Costliest tornado outbreak on record; unadjusted for inflation (Note: The 2011 Super Outbreak remains the costliest on record if adjusted for inflation, with an adjusted damage total of $14.3 billion (2025 USD)))
- Areas affected: Midwestern, Southern United States, Eastern United States
- Power outages: >670,000
- Part of the tornado outbreaks of 2025, the 2024–25 North American winter, and 2025 United States wildfires

Map of tornadoes in the March 14–16 tornado outbreak

From March 14 to 16, 2025, a widespread and deadly tornado outbreak, the largest on record for the month of March, affected much of the Midwestern into the Eastern United States, with additional severe weather and impacts on the East Coast. The Storm Prediction Center (SPC) first issued a moderate risk for severe weather for parts of the Midwest and Southeast on March 14 as a large upper-level trough moved east over the Rockies. The Day 2 outlook was upgraded to a tornado-driven high risk area for portions of Mississippi and Alabama, making it the third ever issuance of a Day 2 high risk, with the previous two being for April 7, 2006 and April 14, 2012.

On March 14, a moderate risk for severe weather was issued for the much of Iowa, Illinois, and Missouri, with a 15 percent risk for significant tornadoes centered around Southern Illinois and Southeastern Missouri. In the early evening, a PDS tornado watch was issued for portions of Southeast Missouri, Northeast Arkansas, Northern Mississippi, and more. Among the tornadoes that touched down that day were an EF3 tornado that killed three people in Bakersfield, Missouri, a long-track, high-end EF3 tornado that tracked through southern Missouri and prompted the issuance of a tornado emergency for Fremont and Van Buren, an EF2 tornado that moved into the Greater St. Louis area, notably crossing a St. Louis Lambert International Airport runway while a plane was taking off, a very long-track, low-end EF4 tornado that struck near Fifty-Six and rural areas of Izard County, Arkansas, a high-end EF4 tornado that caused catastrophic damage to a farm and rural neighborhood near and in Diaz, Arkansas, a long-track, high-end EF3 tornado that went through Cushman and Cave City, Arkansas, killing three, and a low-end EF3 tornado that killed one person after ripping through a trailer park near Poplar Bluff, Missouri. Due to the outbreak occurring on Pi Day, the National Weather Service (NWS) referred to this part of the outbreak as the Pi-Day tornado outbreak.

On March 15, the SPC continued the high risk area, delineating the potential for a widespread outbreak to occur with long-track and potentially violent tornadoes expected, with Particularly Dangerous Situation (PDS) tornado watches being issued for the respective regions. In the early afternoon, a tornado emergency was issued for parts of Walthall, Lawrence, Marion, and Jefferson Davis counties in Mississippi as a large, violent, long-track EF4 tornado was moving through the area; six people were killed and 14 others were injured by this tornado. Tornadoes continued in Mississippi and Alabama throughout the afternoon and evening, including an EF2 tornado that struck Winterboro, Alabama, damaging a high school and killing one person, and an EF3 that killed two people near Plantersville, Alabama. On March 16, a slight risk for tornadoes was issued for the South Atlantic States as several weak tornadoes touched down across the East Coast.

At least 44 people were killed by tornadoes and other weather-related impacts across eight states. Additional non-tornadic impacts associated with the system involved damaging straight-line winds that fueled wildfires in Oklahoma and a dust storm in some areas as a result further east near the Upper Midwest. With a total of 118 confirmed tornadoes, the outbreak became the largest ever in the month of March, and received a score of 147 on the Outbreak Intensity Score (OIS), making it the highest ranked tornado outbreak of the decade and overall classifying it as a "historic" outbreak. The outbreak caused $11 billion in damages, making it the costliest tornado outbreak in United States history when unadjusted for inflation.

== Meteorological synopsis ==
=== Background ===
As early as March 7, 2025, the Storm Prediction Center (SPC) began monitoring the threat of severe weather posed by a vigorous large-scale trough ejection over the High Plains and Upper Midwest. At that point, the large spread in possible outcomes represented in numerical weather prediction computer models prevented the SPC from designating a specific area at risk. By March 9, a 15% severe risk area was introduced for March 14 over the Mississippi Valley and for March 15 over the South. These areas were both upgraded to a 30% risk for severe weather on March 10, as multiple forecast models began to come into agreement on an all-hazards threat (of wind, hail, and tornadoes), including a supercell-focused mode potentially evolving into a QLCS threat. An outlook on March 11 described the March 14 system as "anomalously intense upper cyclone", with a second upper-level trough expected to produce severe weather on March 15.

On March 13, the SPC upgraded the risk for March 14 into a moderate (4/5) risk over parts of the Middle Mississippi valley, including much of Illinois and Missouri, alongside small parts of Iowa, Kentucky, Arkansas, and Tennessee. This risk was described as a "regional outbreak of severe storms", driven by the risk of storms producing swaths of damaging winds potentially in excess of 65 kn (75 mph; 120 km/h) over the region, with areas further south expected to be conducive to the development of strong tornadoes later in the day. The outlook for March 15 was also upgraded to a moderate (4/5) risk as an environment more conducive for significant tornadoes as favorable wind profiles alongside moderate instability produced the conditions necessary for "robust updrafts and intense supercells". A conditional risk was also highlighted further north into Ohio and Kentucky, which were expected to face a primarily non-severe event, reliant on the intensity of convection further south that could stabilize the atmosphere. That same day, as the system moved through the West Coast, it spawned a high-end EF0 tornado in the Los Angeles area, though this is not considered part of the outbreak.

At the 1730Z Day 2 outlook on March 14, a high (5/5) risk was introduced over parts of Mississippi and Alabama, driven by the risk of a tornado outbreak. This was just the third time that the Storm Prediction Center issued a high risk for its Day 2 outlook since 2006, the other two occurring on April 7, 2006 and April 14, 2012.

=== March 14 ===
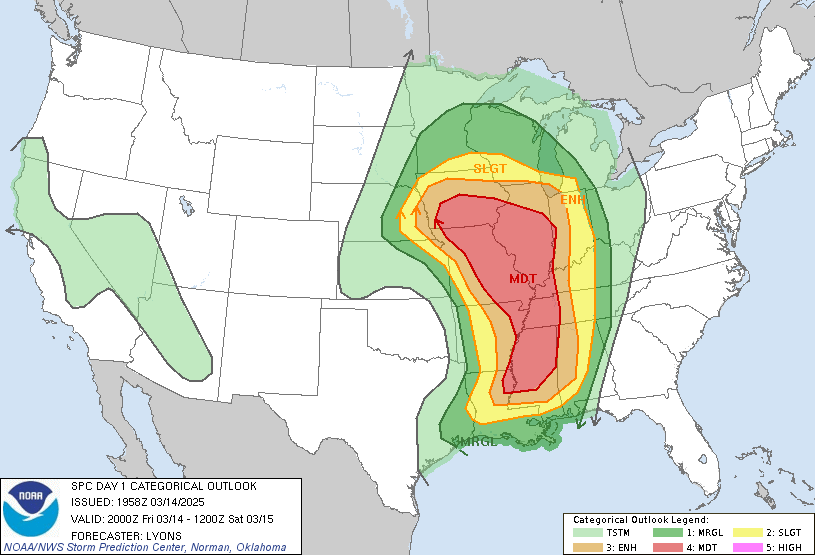
The SPC Day 1 convective outlook for March 14, 2025 at 2000Z, showing the widespread risk of severe weather across the Mississippi Valley and Southeastern United States.

The states of Iowa, Missouri, Illinois, Kentucky, Tennessee, Arkansas, and Mississippi were under a moderate risk for severe weather, as an unusually strong negatively tilted upper-level shortwave trough detected on satellite that morning was expected to produce an intense mid-level jet that followed its parent shortwave and move towards the center of the continental United States. These features produced strong ascent, which, alongside a powerful surface cyclone expected to form and move from the central High Plains towards the Upper Midwest, produced the conditions necessary for the development of significant severe weather. Over much of the middle Mississippi Valley, strong diurnal heating was expected to occur, which, alongside a low-level jet to aid boundary-level moisture, allowed for the development of surface-based storms, which were expected to produce a single fast-moving band of convection that was expected to produce gusts up to 80–100 mph (130–160 km/h) over the region.

Further to the southeast over Missouri, forecasters outlined the risk of more discrete thunderstorms developing on the northern edge of a more concentrated area of low-level moisture. These storms were expected to form into at least semi-discrete supercells due to the presence of strong upper-level flow and strong deep-layer shear. The HRRR model suggested that widespread supercells could develop late in the afternoon, potentially as far south as the border of Mississippi, Arkansas, and Tennessee, with soundings of other forecast models, including the NAM model, favoring the development of intense supercells capable of producing large hail of 2–3 in (5.1–7.6 cm) and potentially significant or intense tornadoes.

Throughout the lower Mississippi Valley, lesser forcing was expected to preclude any possibility of widespread severe weather, but forecasters noted that the atmosphere were capable of producing supercells, some of which had the hazard for large hail, damaging winds, or tornadoes, for any supercells that sustain themselves.

A violent tornado in Diaz, Arkansas on the night of March 14

The first complex of storms had emerged by 10:25 a.m. Central Daylight Time (UTC–5) over southern Kansas and northeastern Oklahoma, which moved into a region of high atmospheric stability and strong convective inhibition, with a minimal severe hazard risk expected to be limited to small hail up to 1.25 in (3.2 cm). The Storm Prediction Center was expecting the formation of an intense squall line to initiate between 3 and 5 p.m. that afternoon. In the evening, a PDS tornado watch was issued for an area in the Mississippi Valley, with severe thunderstorms expected to develop in conditions primed for supercells capable of producing strong, long-track tornadoes. As forecast, numerous supercells began developing across the main risk area, and numerous tornadoes occurred, some of which were long-tracked, and strong to violent.

=== March 15 ===
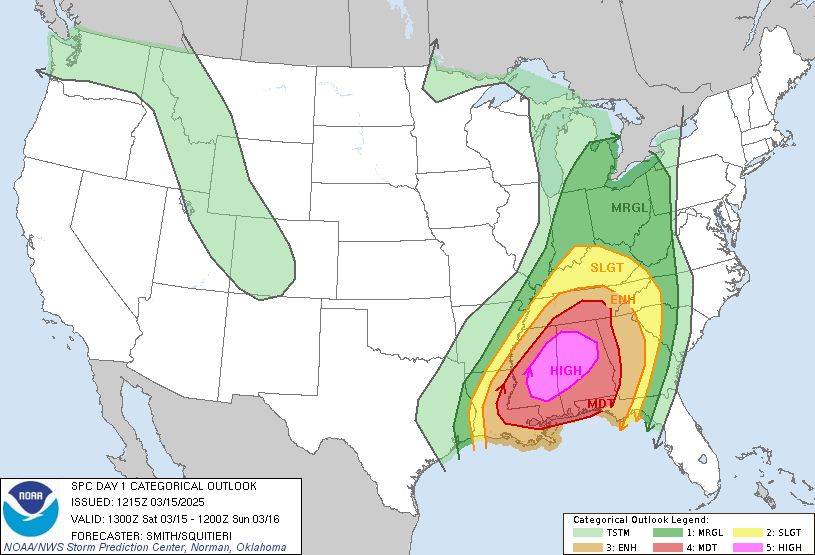
The Storm Prediction Center Day 1 convective outlook issued March 15, 2025 at 1300Z, indicating a high risk for severe weather across parts of Mississippi and Alabama.

A large warm sector had developed over much of the Gulf Coast states, producing widespread dew points near 70 °F (21 °C). That morning, storms had begun developing across the northern edge of the area of elevated moisture. Temperatures to the south and east of these storms were expected to rise to 75–80 °F (24–27 °C), with multiple bands of convection expected to initiate between 12 and 2 p.m. CDT. Moderate levels of CAPE-based instability, ranging from 1500 to 2500 J/kg, and elongated hodographs, forecasted to produce 400–500 m^{2}/s^{2} storm-relative helicity in the first kilometer of the atmosphere, was expected to "favor the rapid development of intense supercells", and alongside strong Significant Tornado Parameter (STP) values of 5–10, were expected to produce numerous tornadoes, some of which may be long-track or violent, as the day progressed.

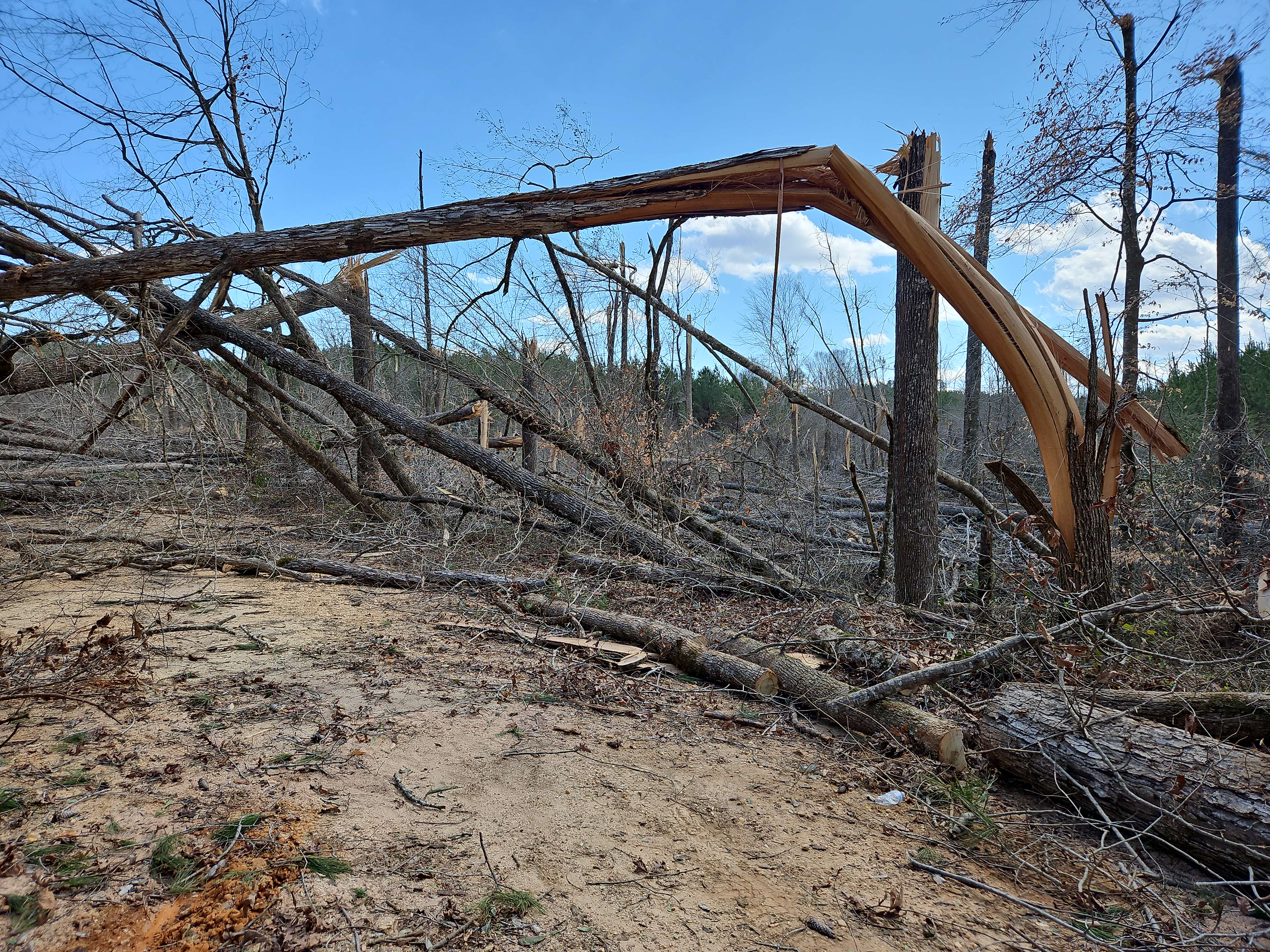
A large hardwood tree snapped by an EF3 tornado near Plantersville, Alabama.

Further north, across northern Alabama and south central Tennessee, the consolidation of storms was expected to bound stronger tornadoes to an area further south, with the northern structure highlighted as a potential area for bowing segments and embedded supercells, prompting the SPC to highlight an area of higher wind risk over these areas. Across parts of Georgia and western South and North Carolina, a weakly unstable air mass alongside intense mid-level flow was expected to produce an environment capable of supporting supercell and line structures, with a risk highlighted for severe wind and tornadoes in the region. Storms from the previous day over the Ohio Valley was expected to continue east as the day progressed, producing a risk for hail and wind, but as the day progressed, forecasters noted the uncertainty of potential airmass recovery that could be conducive for a severe risk over Indiana and southern Michigan later that evening, with models only showing weak instability below 500 J/kg that morning. Soundings from Louisiana and Mississippi indicated that the warm sector included steep lapse rates of 7–8 degrees Celsius from the 700–500 millibar (3,013–5,576 m, 9,882–18,289 ft) layer. A 125 kn (144 mph; 232 km/h) jet at 250 millibars (10,366 m, 33,999 ft) was expected to strengthen the region's wind profile, which, in conjunction with a lower-level jet moving east throughout the day, produced an environment capable of all hazards, including the threat of strong tornadoes.

The high risk area continued into the Day 1 Outlook, including a 30% "hatched" risk for significant tornadoes in central Mississippi and Alabama. In the late morning, a PDS tornado watch was issued for parts of Louisiana and nearly all of Mississippi and later much of Alabama as a tornado outbreak featuring "significant tornadoes, some of which should be long-track and potentially violent," was expected throughout the afternoon and evening.

== Confirmed tornadoes ==
Confirmed tornadoes by Enhanced Fujita rating
EFU	EF0	EF1	EF2	EF3	EF4	EF5	Total
0	20	53	31	11	3	0	118

=== Gamaliel, Arkansas/Bakersfield–Frankville, Missouri ===
Gamaliel, Arkansas/Bakersfield–Frankville, Missouri
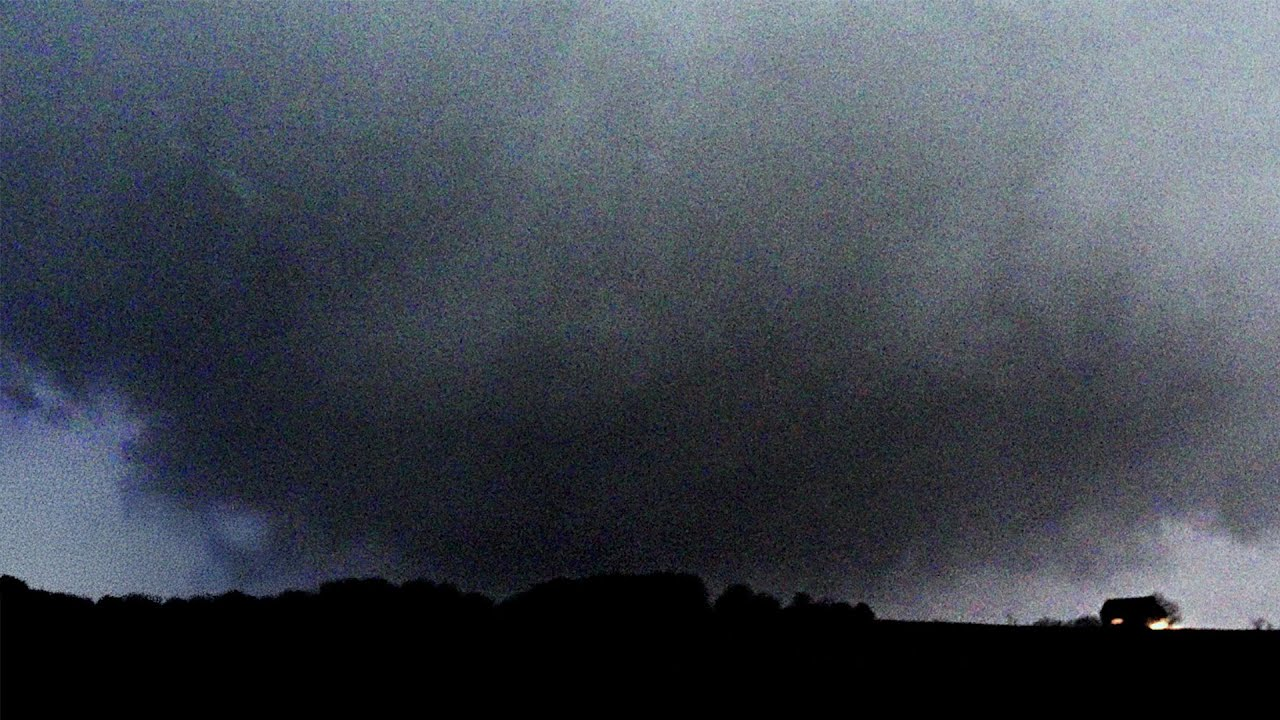
- The tornado near Bakersfield

Meteorological history
- Formed: March 14, 2025, 8:34 p.m. CDT (UTC–05:00)
- Dissipated: March 14, 2025, 9:16 p.m. CDT (UTC–05:00)
- Duration: 42 minutes

EF3 tornado
- on the Enhanced Fujita scale
- Highest winds: 145 mph (233 km/h)

Overall effects
- Fatalities: 3
- Injuries: 4

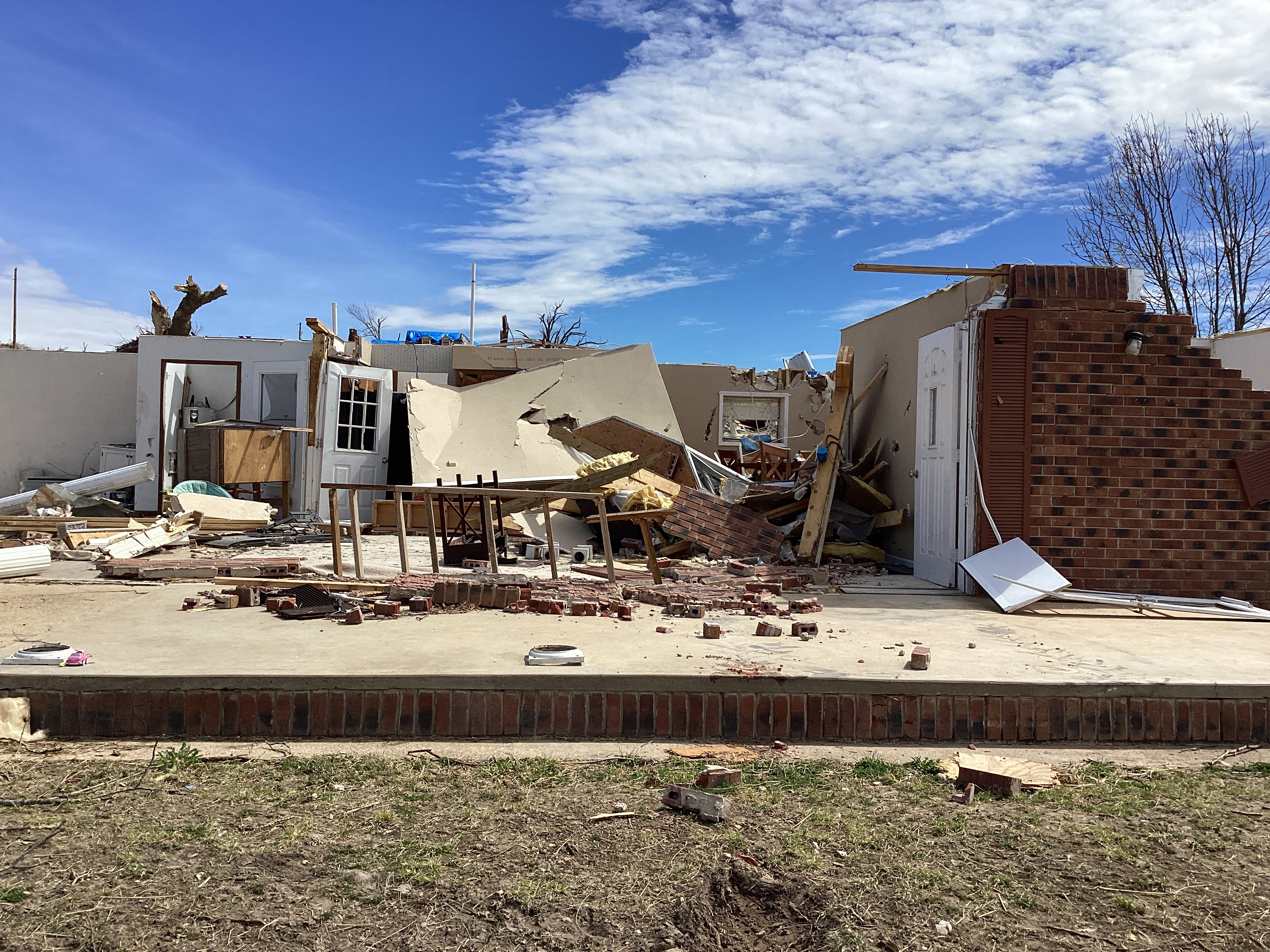
Low-end EF3 damage to a brick home near Bakersfield.

This large, long-tracked, intense tornado first touched down at 8:34 p.m. CDT in the town of Gamaliel, Arkansas in Baxter County. It moved northeastward along AR 101 at EF1 intensity, damaging a post office and a fire station. Continuing northeastward, the tornado snapped or uprooted dozens of trees as it approached and crossed the Arkansas–Missouri border into Ozark County, Missouri. The tornado intensified as it moved into the southern part of Bakersfield, partially destroying multiple homes and structures along County Road 585. Northeast of there, the tornado snapped more trees before intensifying further to EF3 strength as it crossed Route AR on the south side of Bakersfield. One home was swept away while another one had its roof removed and some exterior walls knocked down. A large tank was lofted and thrown near the destroyed home. The tornado then reached its peak intensity as it turned to the east-northeast and crossed County Road 589, where a home was unroofed and had multiple exterior walls knocked down, and nearby trees were snapped and uprooted, with some ground scouring noted. Winds at this location were estimated to be at 145 mph (233 km/h). The outer circulation of the tornado also impacted Bakersfield itself, damaging more homes and the First Baptist Church, destroying the town's baseball and softball complex, and uprooting and snapping trees.

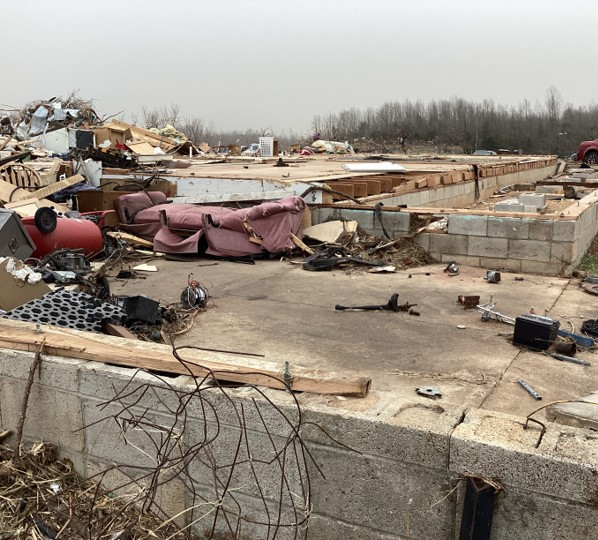
Home completely swept from its foundation in southeast Bakersfield, Missouri.

Moving east-northeast, the tornado struck the Zastrow Hill area on the east side of Bakersfield, where multiple block-foundation mobile homes were rolled and destroyed, and another home was leveled and swept away; debris from these homes was strewn across a nearby hill and along a tree line. Three people were killed and another person was injured in one of the mobile homes. Vehicles from the homes in this area were mangled and flattened, with some missing parts of their wheel structure, and cars were "rolled 50 to 100 yards". After crossing Route 142 northeast of Bakersfield, the tornado uprooted large swaths of trees. Entire groves of trees were debarked and shredded, with some low-lying vegetation debarked and denuded. The tornado then weakened to high-end EF1 intensity. leaving "cyclonic" patterns in the forest as it crossed into Howell County. North of the community of Leota, the tornado restrengthened and obliterated a mobile home at high-end EF2 intensity, injuring three people. Several homes nearby suffered significant roof damage, with large sections of their roofs removed, along with an exterior wall or two knocked down.

The tornado continued east-northeastward at EF2 intensity, leveling an old milk barn along Route FF with only the roof structure being left intact. Numerous trees nearby were uprooted in a cyclonic pattern, and another outbuilding suffered roof damage. The tornado destroyed another cinder block foundation mobile home along County Road 6810 before weakening to EF0 intensity as it crossed Route E, causing only minor to moderate tree damage as it continued east-northeastward. The tornado regained EF1 intensity to the west of China, where several roof decks were ripped off of homes along County Road 6450, with moderate tree damage noted. Multiple outbuildings along Route JJ were severely damaged, another home had roof damage and its roof deck removed, and several trees were uprooted. The tornado briefly intensified to mid-range EF2 intensity after crossing Route 17 near Cottbus. A two-story brick home was significantly damaged, with portions of the roof removed and parts of the paneling walls collapsing. Another home nearby had most of its roof deck removed, and an outbuilding was destroyed. The tornado then struck Frankville at EF1 intensity, inflicting heavy roof damage to a warehouse along US 63. The last area of damage that was found from this tornado occurred along US 160 east of West Plains, where trees were uprooted at EF0 intensity. The tornado then dissipated as it crossed the highway at 9:16 p.m. CDT.

The tornado traveled 35.74 mi (57.52 km) and reached a maximum width of 1,200 yd (1,100 m) during its 42-minute lifespan, causing three fatalities and four reported injuries. After the tornado, FEMA set up a relief shelter at the Bakersfield School.

=== Fifty-Six–Larkin–Ravenden Springs, Arkansas/Fairdealing, Missouri ===
Fifty-Six–Larkin–Ravenden Springs, Arkansas/Fairdealing, Missouri
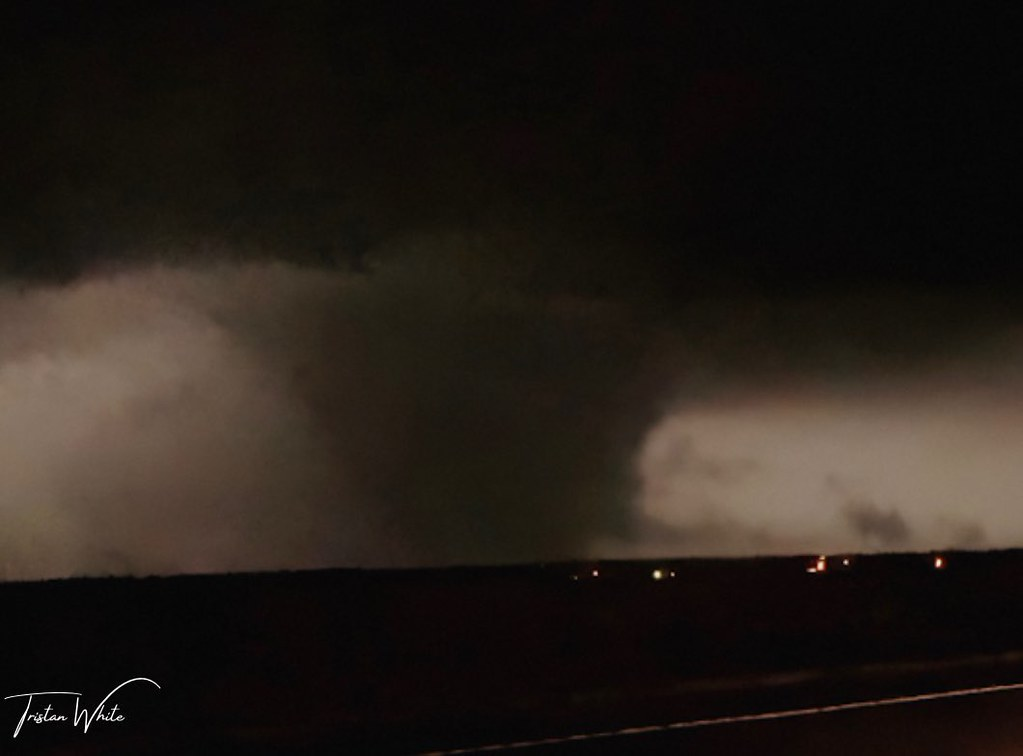
- The tornado near Fairdealing, Missouri

Meteorological history
- Formed: March 14, 2025, 9:11 p.m. CDT (UTC–05:00)
- Dissipated: March 14, 2025, 11:24 p.m. CDT (UTC–05:00)
- Duration: 2 hours, 13 minutes

EF4 tornado
- on the Enhanced Fujita scale
- Highest winds: 170 mph (270 km/h)

Overall effects
- Fatalities: 0
- Injuries: 4

This large, very long-tracked, violent tornado touched down 1 mi (1.6 km) northeast of Alco, and around 8 mi (13 km) southwest of Fifty-Six in Stone County at 9:12 p.m. CDT, Initially, the tornado stayed mainly at EF1 intensity, snapping and uprooting several softwood trees and inflicting minor damage to home. The tornado quickly strengthened to low-end EF3 intensity as it struck the small town of Fifty-Six. Along AR 14, a double-wide mobile home was obliterated and lofted hundreds of yards downstream. Nearby, some cabins were shifted off their foundation and destroyed, and a free-standing garage was demolished. After moving away from Fifty-Six, the tornado moved through the Blanchard Springs Recreational Area. A Remote Automated Weather Station (RAWS) recorded a wind gust of 151 mph (243 km/h). Several trees across the meadow bluff were snapped and uprooted at high-end EF2 intensity; a falling tree injured a camper as well. Near the intersection of Stone County Road 52 and Green Road, an estimated 1,000 yd (910 m) of uprooted trees were noted here, as well as a well-defined convergent pattern. Many more trees were blown down on a hillside as it crossed AR 5.

The tornado then crossed the White River into Izard County, downing several more trees at low-end EF2 intensity along the river and near Boswell. The tornado passed through the south of the community of Boswell before moving through areas just north of Jumbo. Hundreds of trees were snapped, power lines were downed, and additional structural damage occurred. The tornado maintained low-end EF2 intensity south of Knob Creek, Numerous large hardwood trees were blown down as the tornado continued to track east-northeastward through mainly rural areas, crossing La Crosse Road between Violet Hill and Larkin.

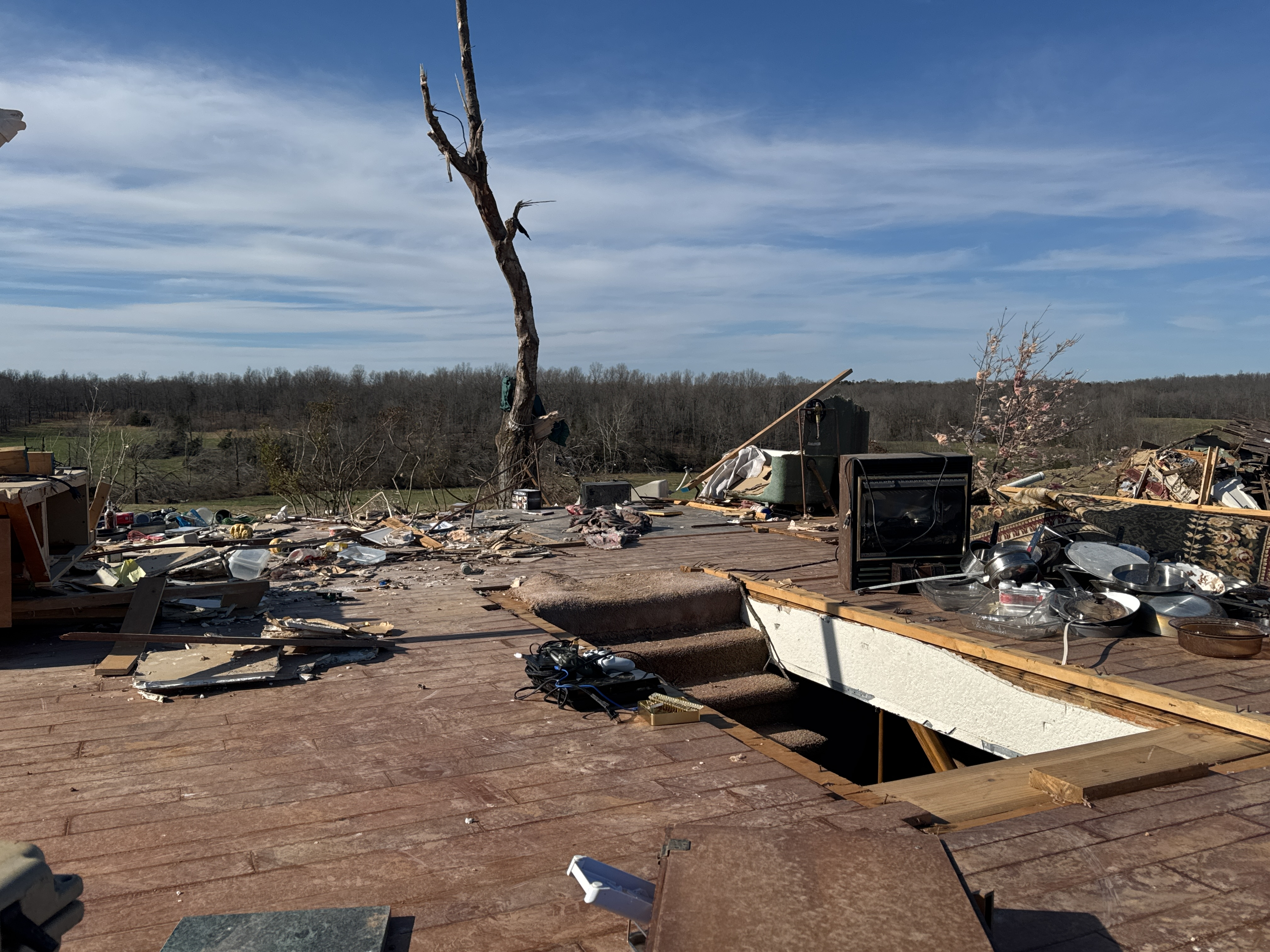
A farmhouse destroyed at EF4 intensity in the Larkin area, south of Violet Hill, Arkansas.

The tornado abruptly intensified to low-end EF4 intensity northwest of Larkin. A well-built home was destroyed and swept away at 170 mph (270 km/h), leaving an extensive debris field downstream. A vehicle nearby was lofted and thrown into a pond behind the property. The tornado quickly weakened to low-end EF2 intensity as it crossed Larkin Road. A small home experienced a collapse of its exterior walls, and a couple of outbuildings were destroyed. After the slight weakening, the tornado rapidly intensified to EF4 strength yet again. A well-anchored two-story farm home was demolished and swept away, with the main level floor still attached to the foundation. The double-doored garage and a large covered porch likely contributed to the home collapsing as they faced the south side of the home, where the tornadic winds and the storm motion were hitting the most. An outbuilding sustained major roof damage, and a nearby metal building was severely damaged, with most of its internal structure intact. The tornado continued tracking through rural areas, severely damaging another home and a metal building along Ebi Quarry Lane. Passing through areas south of Franklin, the tornado strengthened to low-end EF4 intensity for the third time. A home along Easy K Road was completely destroyed. Trees nearby were debarked, several vehicles were heavily damaged, and a nearby metal shop building was also completely demolished. Two residents of the home survived but were severely injured.

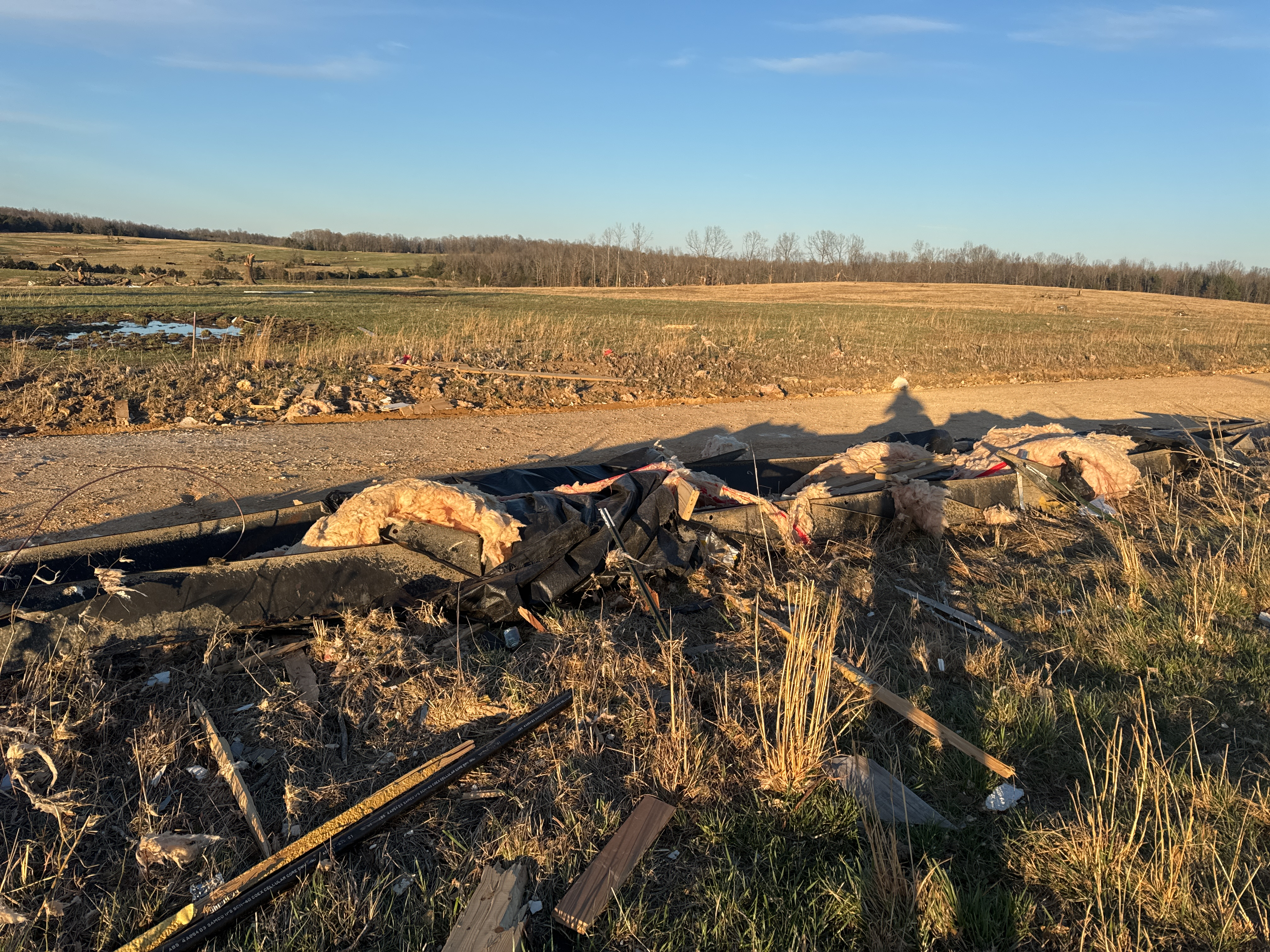
A mobile home completely swept away at low-end EF3 intensity. A surveyor noted that the location of debris is unknown.

The tornado then moved into Sharp County and crossed US 167/AR 56 south of Ash Flat at mid-range EF2 intensity, inflicting significant damage to a home and demolishing an outbuilding. Along US 167, a well-anchored outbuilding was blown off sideways, multiple trees were snapped and uprooted, several homes sustained moderate damage, and a camper trailer was demolished. Along the intersection of Game Reserve Road and Liberty Hill Road, the tornado strengthened to high-end EF2 intensity. A home was shifted off its foundation, with nearby trees being snapped and uprooted. The tornado moved northeastward and crossed US 412/US 62/US 63, destroying outbuildings and pushing a house off its foundation. The tornado continued to damage trees and outbuildings before moving into Randolph County and striking Ravenden Springs as it moved along AR 90, where more trees were snapped or uprooted. East of the town, more trees, along with a couple of homes, were damaged. The tornado then crossed the Eleven Point River and AR 93 south of Dalton, continuing to cause mainly tree damage. It then passed near Hamil as it reached its peak intensity along AR 231, damaging several structures and destroying many outbuildings and a home. The tornado then continued northeastward and crossed AR 251 between Warm Springs and Palestine uprooting and snapping many trees, while also damaging or destroying more outbuildings and a mobile home.

The tornado then passed near Brakebill and crossed AR 115, causing mainly tree damage before crossing into Ripley County, Missouri southeast of Poynor, snapping more trees at high-end EF1 intensity. Just after crossing the state line, a manufactured home was overturned from its foundation at EF2 strength. The person inside the home sheltered in their bathtub and survived with only minor injuries. The tornado then continued northeastward as it approached and passed near Pulaski after crossing Route 142 at EF1-EF2 intensity, inflicting roof damage to homes, damaging or overturning mobile homes, destroying an outbuilding, damaging and snapping power poles, downing large swaths of trees, including trees that fell on and caused additional damage to outbuildings and homes. The tornado then abruptly turned due east and passed through Fairdealing, snapping and uprooting trees at EF1 intensity. The tornado then reintensified to EF2 intensity as it moved into Butler County, Missouri and turned back toward the northeast, inflicting severe damage to multiple homes in and east of Fairdealing, which suffered severe damage, with their roofs being partially or completely destroyed. The tornado snapped and additional trees and wooden power poles before abruptly dissipating as it approached County Road 480.

The tornado was the longest-lived tornado by track and duration of the outbreak, traveling 118.95 mi (191.43 km) and reaching a maximum width of 1,400 yd (1,300 m) during its 133-minute lifespan. AR 14 in Fifty-Six was closed due to the damage caused by the tornado. According to preliminary information from the National Weather Service Little Rock, Arkansas, over 25% of Fifty-Six sustained damage from the tornado. Alongside another EF4 tornado that struck Jackson County later into the night, this was the first time a violent tornado occurred in the state of Arkansas in nearly 11 years, since the 2014 Mayflower-Vilonia tornado. This tornado also had the third longest recorded track in Arkansas history at nearly 94 mi (151 km) when excluding its lengthened path in Missouri, behind an F2 tornado that tracked for 112 mi (180 km) on February 20, 1951, and a devastating EF4 tornado that tracked for 122 mi (196 km) and occurred in nearly the same areas during the 2008 Super Tuesday tornado outbreak.

=== Cushman–Cave City–Reyno–Corning, Arkansas ===
Cushman–Cave City–Reyno–Corning, Arkansas
- The tornado as seen north of Cushman, Arkansas.

Meteorological history
- Formed: March 14, 2025, 10:16 p.m. CDT (UTC–05:00)
- Dissipated: March 14, 2025, 11:51 p.m. CDT (UTC–05:00)
- Duration: 1 hour, 35 minutes

EF3 tornado
- on the Enhanced Fujita scale
- Highest winds: 165 mph (266 km/h)

Overall effects
- Fatalities: 3
- Injuries: 20

This intense, very long-tracked tornado touched down east of the White River, southwest of Cushman, initially damaging trees as it moved northeastward. The tornado quickly intensified to low-end EF3 intensity as the tornado struck a small neighborhood southeast of Cushman. A double-wide manufactured home was destroyed, with its debris thrown into the tree line, killing two people inside the home. Several more mobile homes were obliterated along Claxton Loop Road, with one being blown 50 yd (46 m). Multiple framed homes received moderate to severe damage, including a split-level home that was heavily destroyed, leaving a few interior walls standing; another fatality was recorded here.

The tornado weakened as the tornado tracked through forested areas, snapping and uprooting several hardwood trees at EF1 intensity. An outbuilding along Melon Drive sustained extensive roof damage, with the main framed home sustaining only moderate roof damage. The tornado strengthened to high-end EF2 intensity as a cellphone tower collapsed along West South Street. The tornado then went through Cave City at EF3 intensity. The tornado first crossed West Center Street, where the Soul's Harbor Pentecoastal Church was mostly leveled at low-end EF3 intensity, leaving only a few interior walls standing. More structures near the church suffered significant damage; a single-wide mobile home, a couple of homes were shifted off their foundations, and several trees were snapped. The tornado went through areas north of downtown Cave City at high-end EF2 intensity; the Cave City Auto sustained significant damage to its roof, a couple of homes had their roofs ripped away, several trees were snapped, with a license plate found to be embedded in one of them, a metal storage building was demolished, though construction quality of the building were substandard, a poorly built home along Meadow Lane was mostly leveled and destroyed.

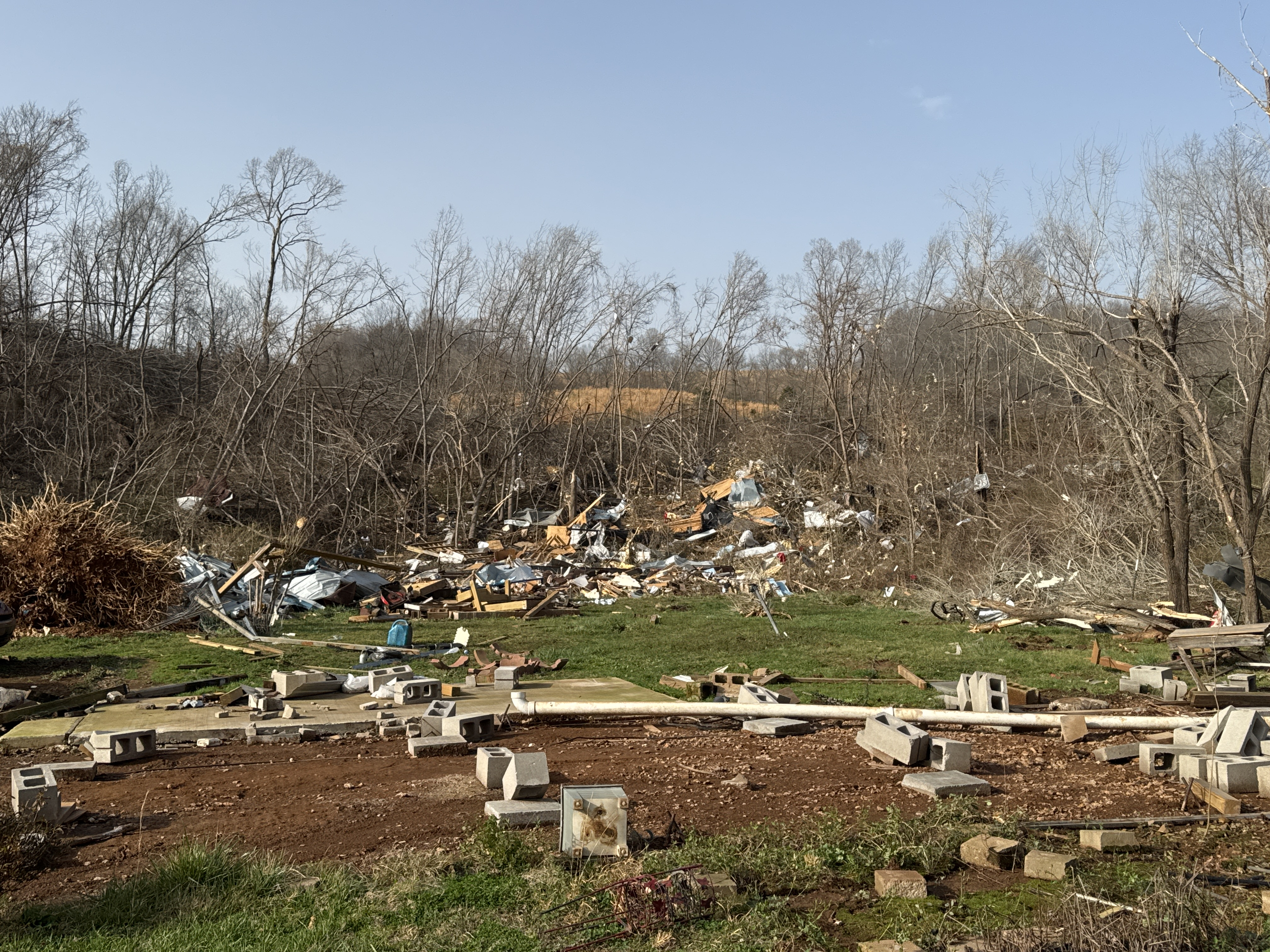
Low-end EF3 damage to a single-wide mobile home that was destroyed near Cushman, Arkansas. Two fatalities were recorded in the home.

The tornado rapidly intensified to its peak intensity of high-end EF3 northwest of Cave City. A home that was nearly finished was destroyed by winds of 165 mph (266 km/h). Many large vehicles were tossed and heavily damaged, a large metal storage building nearby was mostly flattened, and numerous hardwood trees sustained extensive damage. The tornado significantly weakened as an outbuilding suffered major roof damage at EF1 intensity. The tornado maintained EF1 intensity, snapping and uprooting several trees. The tornado then quickly reintensified to high-end EF2 intensity. A single-wide mobile home was demolished, another mobile home was rolled over, and an outbuilding was swept off its foundation. The tornado strengthened more as an exterior wall of a two-story home collapsed at high-end EF2 strength, with a nearby outbuilding getting obliterated. After maintaining EF1 intensity through rural areas, the tornado reattained high-end EF2 intensity as the tornado went through the small community of Calamine, destroying a single-wide mobile home and inflicting significant roof damage to a metal building system. The tornado weakened to high-end EF1 intensity as the tornado went through a farmstead along Bilbrey Road, demolishing several outbuildings and causing minor damage to a home and metal building.

The tornado missed the city of Black Rock to its west at EF1 intensity, downing several trees and causing light to moderate roof damage to several homes. The tornado sustained that intensity, snapping several more trees, causing major roof damage to a chicken house, and moderately damaging a metal building near the community of Manson. The tornado began to parallel US 67 at EF2 intensity, downing several power poles and trees, snapping more than 40 power poles. The tornado weakened as it moved through Reyno, causing major roof damage to an outbuilding and destroying an empty grain bin in town. The tornado intensified to EF2 strength again southwest of Datto, snapping power poles and destroying six empty grain bins. The tornado continued afterwards, overturning a center irrigation pivot, snapping power poles, and damaging an outbuilding near Corning, spreading debris into a nearby field. The tornado produced minor tree and structural damage before lifting just south of the Missouri state line.

Three people were killed by the tornado, and at least five others were injured. This was the second-longest-lived tornado by track and duration of the outbreak, being on the ground for over an hour and a half, with a total path length at 81.84 mi (131.71 km). It reached a maximum width of 700 yd (640 m), while damage surveys indicate the tornado peaked at high-end EF3 intensity with winds of 165 mph (266 km/h).

=== Eastwood–Leeper, Missouri ===
Eastwood–Leeper, Missouri
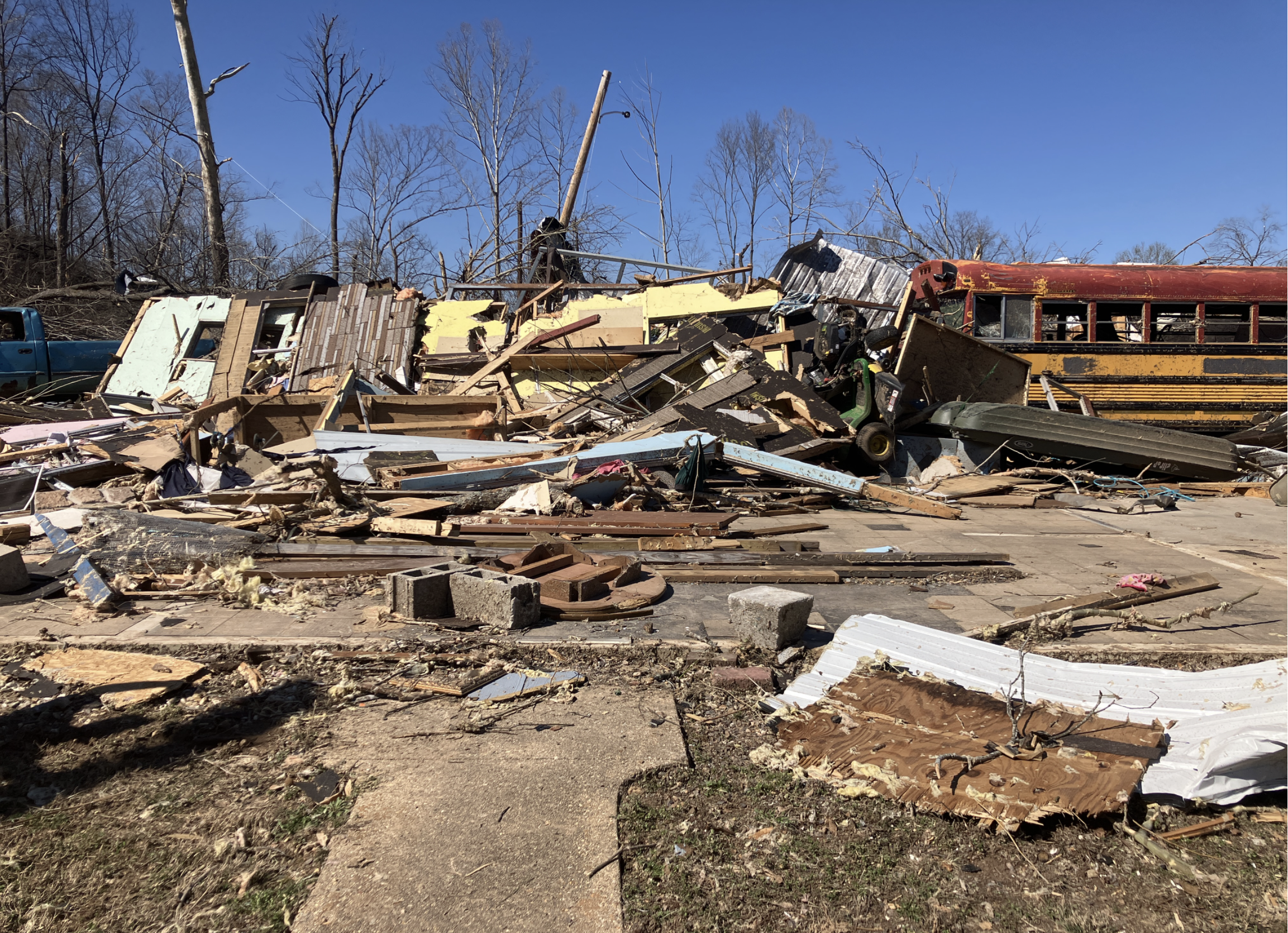
- High-end EF3 damage to a well constructed residence in Leeper

Meteorological history
- Formed: March 14, 2025, 10:28 p.m. CDT (UTC–05:00)
- Dissipated: March 14, 2025, 10:56 p.m. CDT (UTC–05:00)
- Duration: 28 minutes

EF3 tornado
- on the Enhanced Fujita scale
- Highest winds: 165 mph (266 km/h)

Overall effects
- Fatalities: 2
- Injuries: 0

This intense tornado touched down on the Northside of Eastwood and stayed in rural areas for about 10 miles, snapping and uprooting hundreds of trees while moving northeast. It crossed Current River north of Chilton and severely damaged more trees. It continued along its path and moved through the small community of Jackson, damaging Electrical Transmission Lines. Two homes lost most of their roofs, another had shingle damage, a barn sustained minor damage, and a wooden power pole was snapped.

Upon crossing into Wayne County, the tornado intensified to peak intensity, causing widespread high-end EF2 damage to a few homes on the Northside of Leeper. Three homes on the Westside of Black River got heavily damaged. A well engineered residence was completely destroyed at high-end EF3 intensity. The whole structure collapsed and got swept off its foundation. A nearby house lost most of its roof, another had broken windows, and three manufactured homes, along with a barn, were destroyed. Thousands of trees were snapped or uprooted, and two people were killed when a camper was thrown into the Black River. The intense tornado continued, leaving countless uprooted and partially debarked hardwood trees behind. After leaving the community, the tornado substantially weakened but stayed on the ground for several more minutes, moving through forested areas and damaging more trees at high-end EF1 to low-end EF2 intensity. Eventually the tornado dissipated near County Road 361 south of Patterson and near Maddox Lake.

Overall, two people were killed by the tornado. Despite being one of the shorter track tornadoes of the outbreak, it stayed on the ground for about 30 minutes, with a total path length at 31.32 mi (50.40 km). It reached a maximum width of 325 yd (297 m) and peaked at high-end EF3 intensity with winds of 165 mph (266 km/h).

=== Jacksonport–Diaz–Campbell Station, Arkansas ===
Jacksonport–Diaz–Campbell Station, Arkansas
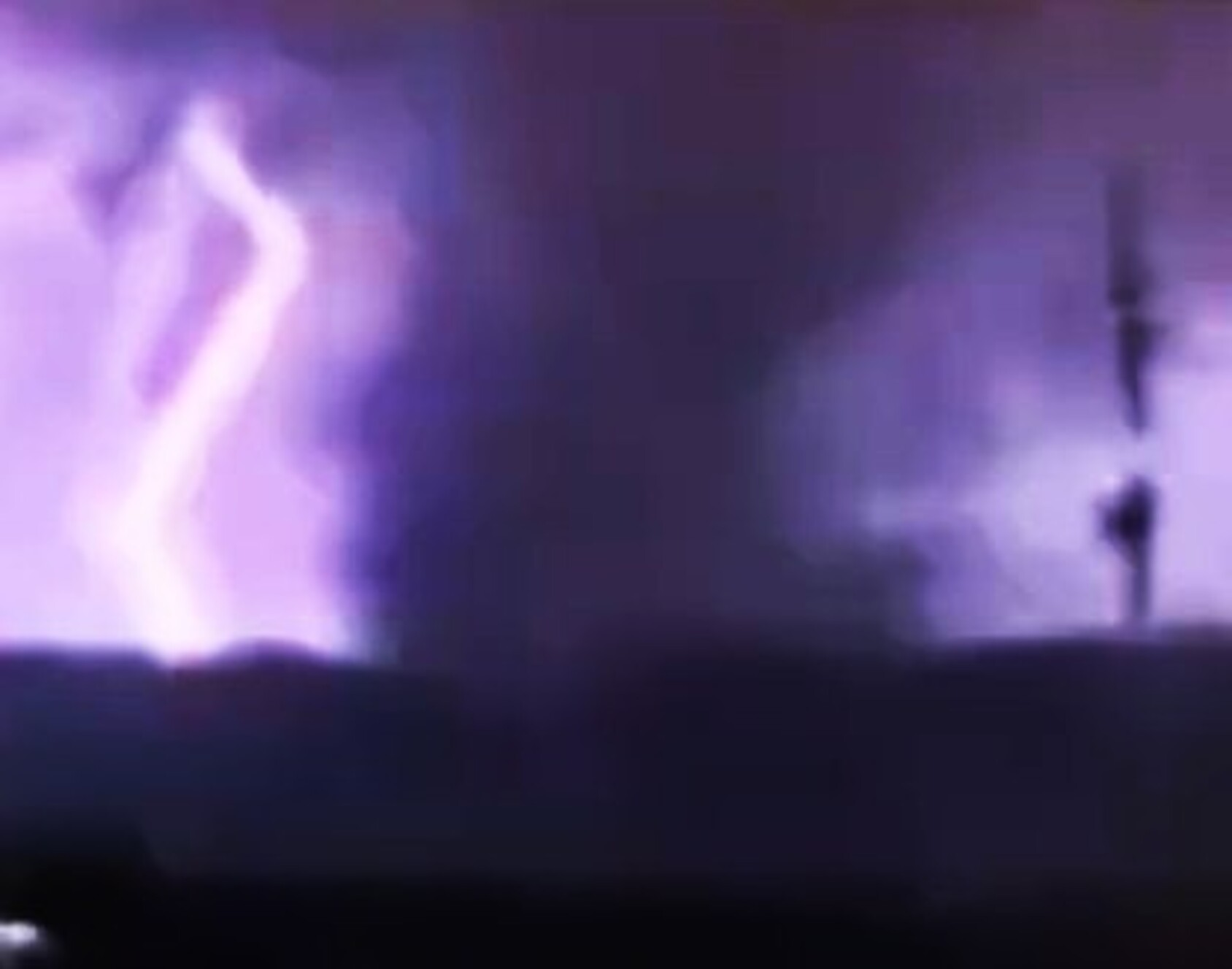
- A CCTV still of the tornado near Diaz as it was illuminated by lightning

Meteorological history
- Formed: March 14, 2025, 11:13 p.m. CDT (UTC–05:00)
- Dissipated: March 14, 2025, 11:36 p.m. CDT (UTC–05:00)
- Duration: 23 minutes

EF4 tornado
- on the Enhanced Fujita scale
- Highest winds: 190 mph (310 km/h)

Overall effects
- Fatalities: 0
- Injuries: 2

This very large and violent tornado first developed at 11:17 p.m. CDT on March 14 in the small community of Departee in Independence County near Departee Creek Road, initially snapping tree limbs. The tornado quickly intensified to low-end EF2 intensity, snapping several power poles along Buzzard Roast Road. Along Meadow Lake, several poultry homes were extensively damaged, and multiple trees were snapped at EF1 intensity before the tornado crossed Departee Creek into Jackson County.

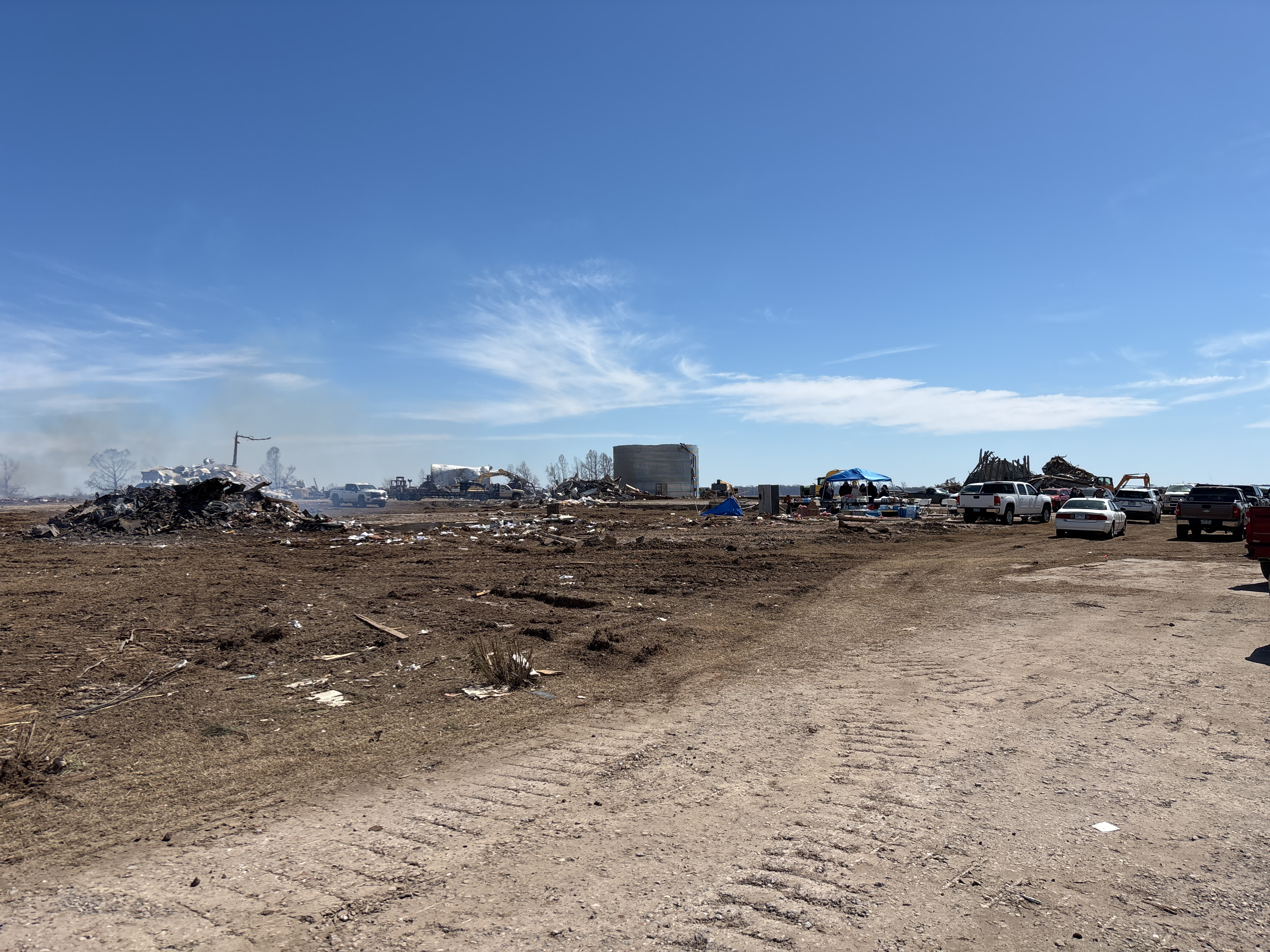
EF4 damage done to a large farmstead southwest of Jacksonport.

The tornado grew in size and intensity as it traversed through rural areas. As the tornado crossed AR 14 east of Macks, it became violent and struck a farmstead at low-end EF4 intensity. A well-built office building was leveled, a one-story home in front of the office building was mostly leveled with only the bathroom remaining, another home sustained similar devastation, four soy bean silos were destroyed, a farming equipment building was mangled with two metal pillars yanked out of the ground, a large metal tank was thrown and mangled by the tornado, and several large metal buildings were leveled and swept away. Large hardwood trees were also severely debarked and denuded, and a trailer was thrown 100 yd (91 m) onto a home, injuring a resident sheltering in the home. The tornado reached its peak width of 1,760 yd (1,610 m) (1 mi (1.6 km)) as it was impacting this neighborhood.

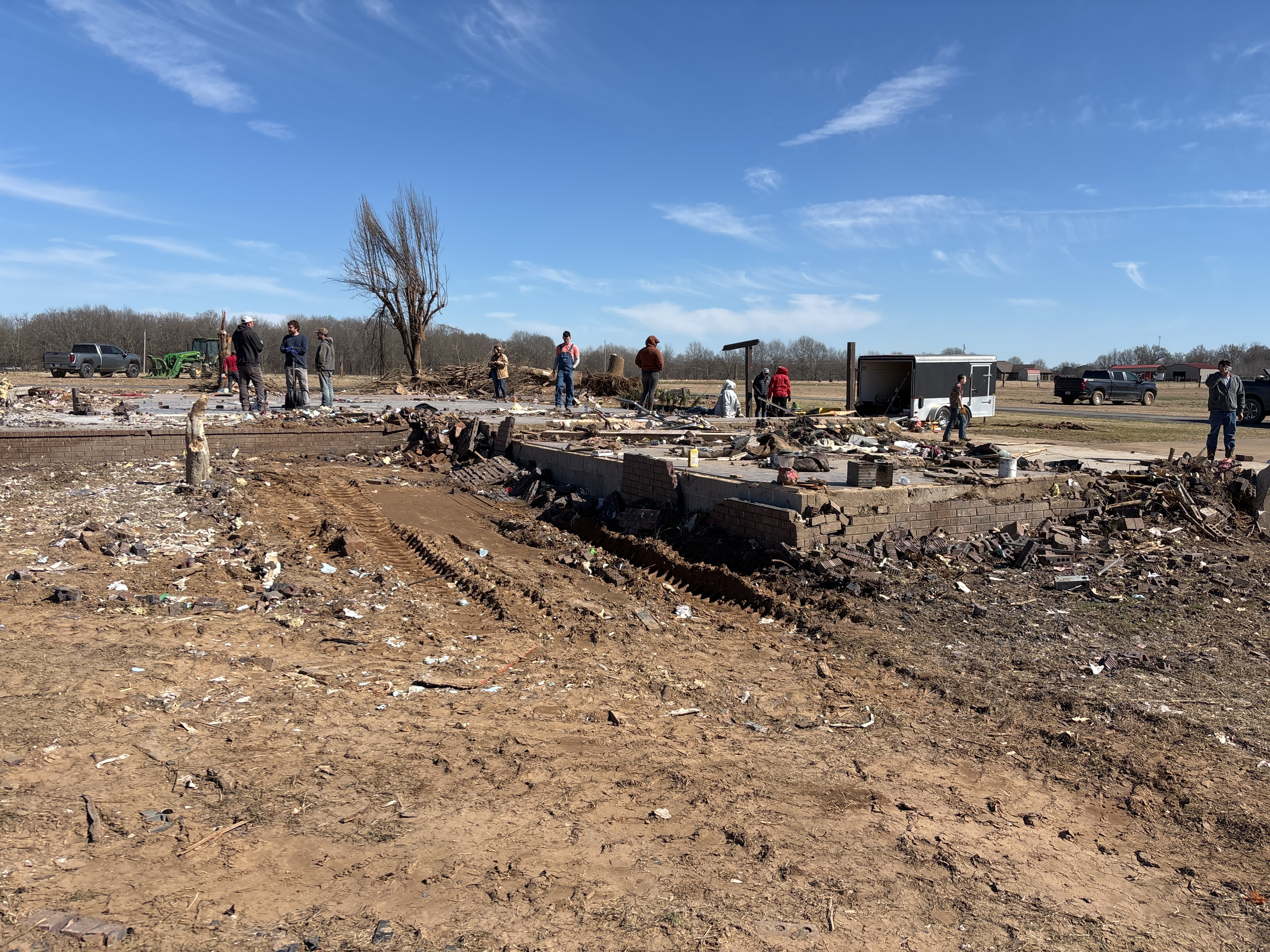
A large, well-anchored home destroyed and mostly swept clean off of foundation near Diaz at high-end EF4 intensity.

Moving northeast, the tornado weakened to EF3 intensity. Several trees along the White River were snapped and severely debarked. Nearby, multiple metal truss towers were heavily damaged and mangled. After crossing the river, the tornado made an abrupt north-northeast turn as it weakened to EF1 intensity, grazing the southern side of the town of Jacksonport. Pecan trees were uprooted as the tornado shifted back to a northeast direction. Narrowing in size, the tornado restrengthened to high-end EF2 intensity. Numerous trees and power lines were snapped and uprooted along an Oxbow Lake called The Cut Off. As the tornado neared the community of Fitzgerald northwest of Diaz, the tornado reached its peak intensity of high-end EF4, with estimated wind speeds of 190 mph (310 km/h) as the tornado moved through a neighborhood along AR 17. A large, anchor-bolted home was leveled and mostly swept off its foundation. Multiple metal buildings were obliterated near the home, several trees were debarked and denuded, and several vehicles and a dump truck were thrown 75–200 yd (69–183 m). A nearby home sustained extensive damage to its southern exterior walls.

After crossing AR 17, the tornado weakened to low-end EF3 intensity as another metal building was destroyed, with a home nearby sustaining severe roof damage. The tornado weakened slightly more to high-end EF2 intensity, inflicting significant roof damage to a home and extensively snapping trees as the tornado began scouring the bare soil on the ground. The tornado struck the city of Campbell Station at low-end EF3 intensity, collapsing a microwave tower along Campbell Lane. Several homes in the city sustained significant roof damage, and an SUV was thrown from one of the damaged homes into a field. A large steel tank was thrown 3,000 ft (910 m) and landed along AR 367 before the tornado began a steady weakening trend. Several trees along County Road 43 were snapped and uprooted before the tornado eventually dissipated southeast of Tuckerman along Village Creek south of AR 37 and west of I-57 at 11:35 p.m CDT.

Despite the intensity, no fatalities were reported from this tornado. Two people were injured, including a police officer who was seriously injured when his patrol car was tossed by the tornado. The tornado was on the ground for 23 minutes, during which time it traveled 18.62 mi (29.97 km) and reached a maximum width of 1,760 yd (1,610 m). The tornado peaked at high-end EF4 intensity with winds of 190 mph (310 km/h), making it the strongest of the outbreak. Along with the long-track EF4 tornado earlier into the evening, this was the first time that multiple violent tornadoes impacted Arkansas since the March 1997 tornado outbreak, where multiple F4 tornadoes struck throughout the state.

=== Poplar Bluff, Missouri ===
Poplar Bluff, Missouri
- The tornado approaching Poplar Bluff

Meteorological history
- Formed: March 14, 2025, 11:27 p.m. CDT (UTC–05:00)
- Dissipated: March 14, 2025, 11:47 p.m. CDT (UTC–05:00)
- Duration: 20 minutes

EF3 tornado
- on the Enhanced Fujita scale
- Highest winds: 145 mph (233 km/h)

Overall effects
- Fatalities: 1
- Injuries: 3

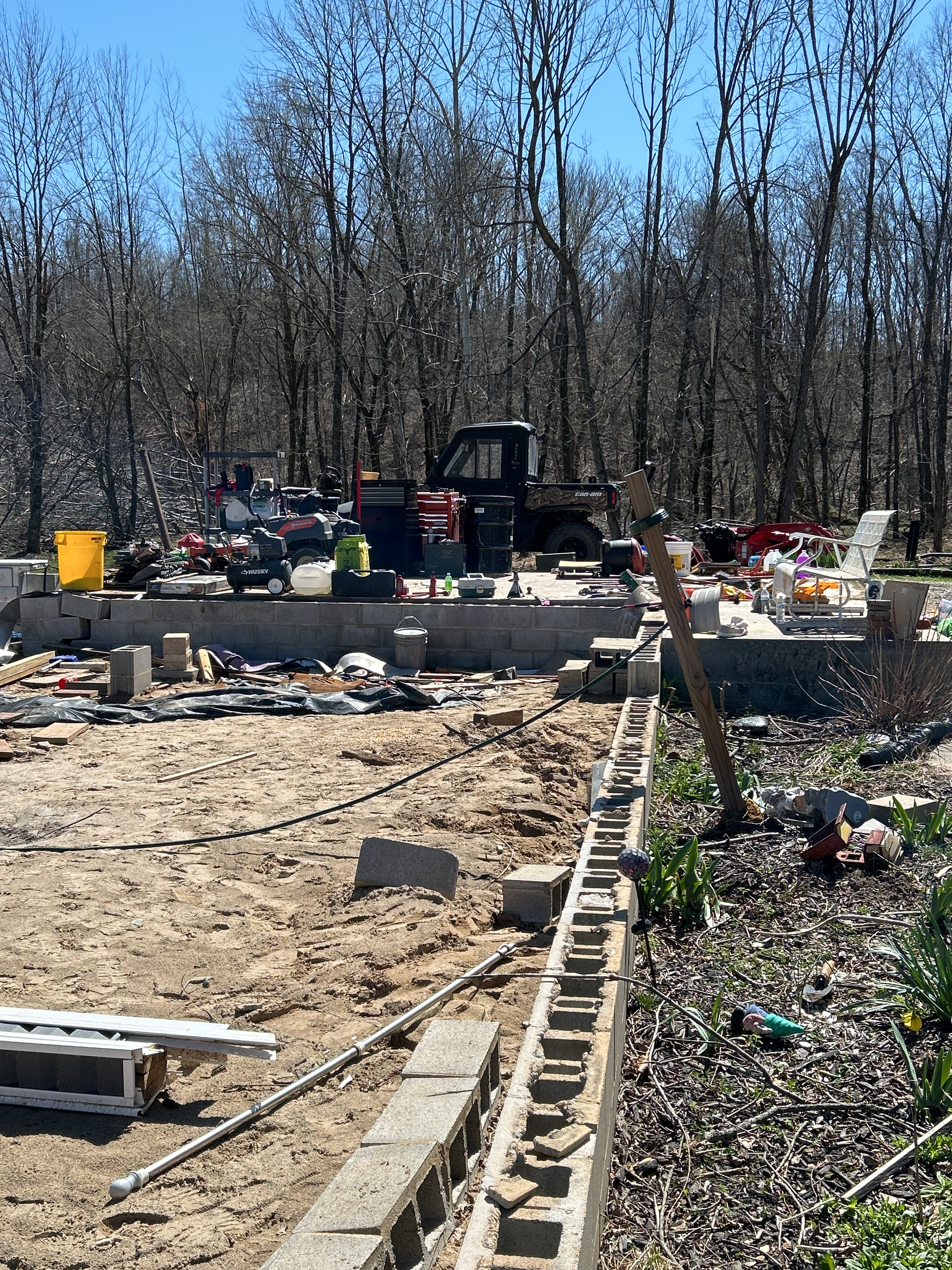
Poorly-anchored home swept away at EF3 intensity

After the long-track EF4 tornado that started in Arkansas dissipated, the parent supercell spooled up this intense tornado northeast of Fairdealing along County Road 462 at 11:27 p.m. CDT. It moved generally east-northeastward, uprooting trees and inflicting minor damage to homes. After crossing Route M, the tornado strengthened to EF1 intensity, snapping and uprooting trees. As it approached Poplar Bluff, the tornado quickly strengthened to its peak intensity of EF3 intensity along County Road 450, sweeping away a block-foundation home and shifting an older home off its foundation, leveling it. One person was killed in the latter house. The tornado then continued east-northeastward at EF1 intensity, snapping or uprooting trees and flipping a mobile home. The tornado then re-intensified to EF2 strength, removing the roof and some of the siding off of a brick home. The tornado then impacted a group of duplex homes at low-end EF3 intensity, removing the roofs and knocking down the exterior walls of some of them. The tornado then approached and crossed US 67 at the Route PP exit at EF1-EF2 intensity, destroying multiple mobile homes and a garage, heavily damaging a church, and snapping and uprooting trees.

The tornado then entered the western city limits of Poplar Bluff, damaging multiple businesses and ripping part of the roof off the Poplar Bluff Early Childhood Center. It then impacted Three Rivers College, damaging apartment buildings and a church. The tornado then continued east-northeastward through the northwestern part of Poplar Bluff and crossed Business US 60/Business US 67, damaging apartment buildings, businesses, and vehicles, and snapping trees and power poles. It continued to snap trees and power poles as it moved through neighborhoods in the northern part of Poplar Bluff, which included trees falling on homes. The tornado then crossed US 60, exited Poplar Bluff, and turned northeastward at EF1 intensity, uprooting dozens of trees and damaging the roof of a home. As it passed west of Rombauer, the tornado re-intensified to low-end EF3 intensity, destroying a large portion of a shop-home, inflicting heavy roof and exterior wall damage to other homes, and uprooting more trees. The tornado then steadily weakened, ripping the roof off of a barn and uprooting numerous trees before dissipating at 11:47 p.m. CDT after traveling for 18.65 mi (30.01 km). It was on the ground for 20 minutes, had a peak width of 350 yd (320 m), and was responsible for one fatality and three injuries.

=== Kentwood, Louisiana/Tylertown–Society Hill–Carson, Mississippi ===
Kentwood, Louisiana/Tylertown–Society Hill–Carson, Mississippi
- The tornado in the Tylertown, Mississippi area

Meteorological history
- Formed: March 15, 2025, 12:17 p.m. CDT (UTC–05:00)
- Dissipated: March 15, 2025, 1:39 p.m. CDT (UTC–05:00)
- Duration: 1 hour, 22 minutes

EF4 tornado
- on the Enhanced Fujita scale
- Highest winds: 170 mph (270 km/h)

Overall effects
- Fatalities: 6
- Injuries: 14

This large, long-tracked, and violent tornado devastated areas in and around the Mississippi communities of Tylertown, Salem, Society Hill, and Carson, causing severe damage in multiple areas. The tornado began in Tangipahoa Parish, Louisiana at 12:17 p.m. CDT, causing EF1 damage to trees and structures before entering Pike County, Mississippi. There, the tornado caused widespread tree damage, damaged outbuildings and houses, and blew away manufactured homes, reaching EF2 intensity as it approached and entered Walthall County, upon which the tornado struck the Paradise Ranch RV resort, destroying all of its cabins and over 200 campsites. Passing to the northwest of Tylertown, the tornado rapidly intensified and briefly reached EF4 intensity as it destroyed a well-built two story home and obliterated multiple manufactured homes nearby. Continuing northeastwards, the tornado fluctuated between EF2-EF3 intensity, continuing to cause widespread tree damage and more isolated damage to structures, killing three people to the northwest of Darbun before entering Marion County. There, the tornado damaged or destroyed numerous homes and caused major tree damage, striking the Whitebluff area at EF3 intensity and entering Jefferson Davis County shortly thereafter, where it damaged or destroyed multiple structures, including a manufactured home in which two more people were killed. Continuing into Covington County, the tornado damaged trees and structures, including a well-built wood home that received an EF4 rating as it shrank and occluded. The tornado dissipated at 1:39 p.m. CDT to the southwest of Collins. As the tornado was ongoing, a separate EF3 tornado formed and moved a nearly identical path through parts of Walthall and Marion counties, adding to the damages and causing an additional fatality.

Immediately following the tornado, recovery efforts were intensive, but many of the areas affected were left without disaster relief for months following the storm. Walthall County alone spent around $700,000 (2025 USD) on cleanup efforts alone, but were forced to cease their operations for over a month as the county could not afford to spend anymore without assurance that it would receive federal reimbursement under a disaster declaration. Multiple other Mississippi counties were left without federal aid for over two months following the storms.

This tornado was the deadliest of the outbreak, killing six people and injuring 14 others. It was on the ground for a total of an hour and 22 minutes, with a path length of 67.16 mi (108.08 km), and reached a peak width of approximately 1,400 yd (1,300 m).

=== Tylertown–Darbun–Morgantown, Mississippi ===
Tylertown–Darbun–Morgantown, Mississippi
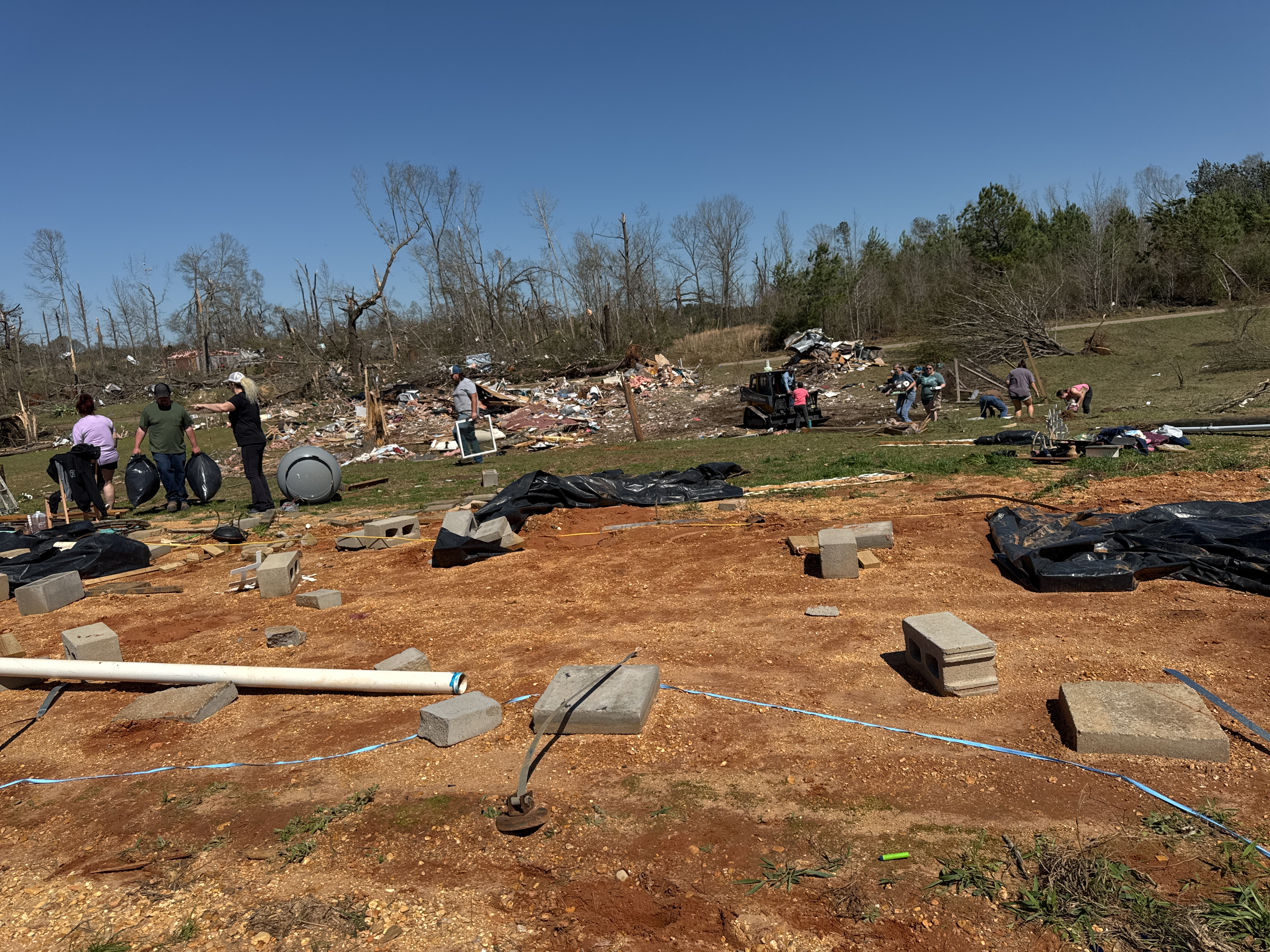
- A mobile home was destroyed at EF3 intensity, north of Tylertown

Meteorological history
- Formed: March 15, 2025, 1:24 p.m. CDT (UTC–05:00)
- Dissipated: March 15, 2025, 1:54 p.m. CDT (UTC–05:00)
- Duration: 30 minutes

EF3 tornado
- on the Enhanced Fujita scale
- Highest winds: 140 mph (230 km/h)

Overall effects
- Fatalities: 1
- Injuries: 2

Approximately 45 minutes after the long-track EF4 tornado passed through Walthall County, another large and intense tornado developed southwest of Tylertown at EF0 intensity. Steadily strengthening to EF1 intensity as it approached, it began to track just east of the prior violent tornado, passing even closer at within 2 mi (3.2 km) of the city, where a PDS tornado warning was issued for the area. A nearby traffic camera recorded the two tornadoes crossing over on US 98. EF3 damage was first produced as the tornado went north-northwest of Tylertown, where framed and mobile homes suffered major damage. Widespread EF1-EF2 tree damage also was prevalent as the tornado headed northeast, still parallel with the prior violent tornado's track before reaching EF3 intensity for a second time south-southwest of Salem, again obliterating mobile homes. The tornado briefly weakened back to EF1 intensity, before reaching EF3 intensity for a third time as it yet again destroyed manufactured residences. Now at EF2 intensity, the tornado began to pass just east of Salem, causing widespread, and total tree fall to forests. Some residences to the east of the community suffered considerable levels of damage before the tornado weakened to EF1 intensity and passed through the community of Darbun.

Entering Marion County, the tornado remained strong as it caused EF2 damage to chicken farms and at one nearby farmhouse. Just west of Morgantown, the tornado began to cause its last bits of EF2 or greater damage, with framed residences receiving extensive roof damage, where as manufactured homes were blown away. The tornado began to shrink in size and weaken to EF1 intensity. Near Goss, or north of Morgantown, the tornado dissipated after being on the ground for 26.05 mi (41.92 km) and at 880 yd (800 m) wide. One person was killed in Walthall County, while two people were injured in Marion County. At least $5 million (2025 USD) was inflicted across the two counties.

=== Plantersville–Stanton–Clanton, Alabama ===
Plantersville–Stanton–Clanton, Alabama
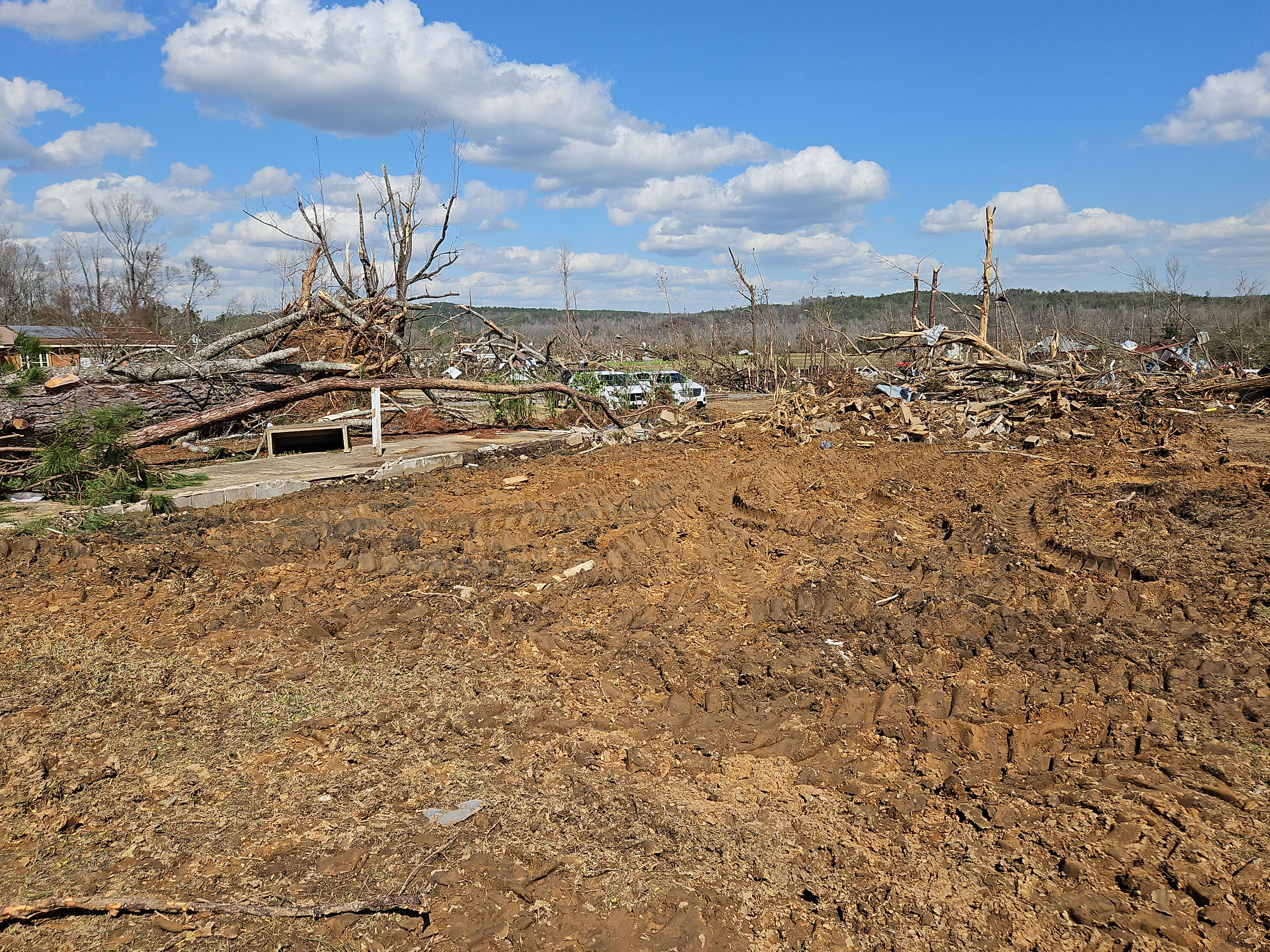
- A mobile home was wiped away from this spot, southeast of Plantersville.

Meteorological history
- Formed: March 15, 2025, 8:50 p.m. CDT (UTC–05:00)
- Dissipated: March 15, 2025, 9:20 p.m. CDT (UTC–05:00)
- Duration: 30 minutes

EF3 tornado
- on the Enhanced Fujita scale
- Highest winds: 140 mph (230 km/h)

Overall effects
- Fatalities: 2
- Injuries: 2

During the evening hours, a tornado touched down at EF0 intensity in the extreme northeastern corner of Dallas County at 8:50 p.m. CDT. This tornado, south of Plantersville, quickly widened as it began causing EF1 damage to lots of trees as it tracked parallel to County Road 63 to the north-northeast. Encroaching on Lovelady Drive to the southeast of Plantersville, the tornado strengthened to EF2 strength as it plowed through forested areas. Now becoming strong, the tornado impacted a neighborhood adjacent to County Road 63. Here, the tornado inflicted severe damage to trees and a few mobile homes, one of them being completely destroyed at low-end EF3 strength. Another nearby instance of EF3 damage occurred to a professional building which had its exterior walls collapsed, and a metal building north of the professional building suffered from rigid frame collapses. EF2 damage was also noted to occur in the Lovelady Drive area, as modular home units were displaced from their undercarriages and vaulted. The tornado then suddenly turned northeast and wiped away an outbuilding at EF2 intensity, before continuing northeast and having killed two elderly people and injuring an additional pair.

The tornado then entered Autauga County at 8:54 p.m. CDT. The track across the county was relatively brief, only having lasted two minutes until 8:56 p.m. CDT. However, damage remained considerable as the tornado destroyed entire swaths of forests at high-end EF2 strength. National Weather Service damage surveyors noted that had there been other damage indicators beside trees impacted within the Autauga County portion, that sections in this part of the track also possibly would have garnered an EF3 rating. The storm continued into Chilton County, fluctuating in strength as it sometimes reached EF2 intensity to more trees. East-southeast of Stanton, the tornado crossed over County Road 64, uprooting and snapping trees with EF2-level winds, while over to the west a home and outbuilding suffered moderate EF1 damage. Along US 82, the storm impacted another grouping of residencies, with one mobile home completely destroyed at considerable strength. On both County Roads 17 and 16, two homes on both respective streets had large sections of its roof structures removed with widespread EF2 tree damage in between. Significant damage was caused to two separate residencies located on County Roads 15 and 341 correspondingly. The first of the two structures was a property which had its residence's exterior walls collapsed, while the other was a modular house that was obliterated far southeast and east of Maplesville. The last instance of significant (EF2+) damage occurred on County Road 76, as yet more modular type homes were destroyed. Afterwards, the tornado continued on its weakening trend along a more shifting track towards Clanton, before dissipating in the western neighborhoods of the city at 9:20 p.m. CDT.

This was the first of two EF3 tornadoes to strike Alabama on March 15. Two people were killed and two more were injured in Dallas County. The tornado traveled for 24.33 mi (39.16 km) and was 1,000 yd (910 m) wide at its largest.

=== Jackson's Gap–Daviston, Alabama ===
Jackson's Gap–Daviston, Alabama
Meteorological history
- Formed: March 15, 2025, 10:48 p.m. CDT (UTC-05:00)
- Dissipated: March 15, 2025, 11:12 p.m. CDT (UTC-05:00)
- Duration: 24 minutes

EF3 tornado
- on the Enhanced Fujita scale
- Highest winds: 140 mph (230 km/h)

Overall effects
- Fatalities: 0
- Injuries: 0

During the late night, this intense tornado quickly touched down near Russell Ferry Estates near Lake Martin, before crossing County Road 40 and passing over Midway Estates Road. Extensive EF0 damage was observed in this area. Multiple homes sustained roof damage due to nearby trees falling on homes. The tornado then crossed US Highway 280, where minor damage occurred to businesses constructed out of metal, and numerous trees were snapped or uprooted. Farther to the northeast, the tornado would cause extensive tree damage to Abbett Drive, with concentrated tree damage occurring on Camp Ascca Road. A manufactured home sustained major roof damage, and was nearly lifted from its foundation, but managed to remain anchored. Just 50–75 yards (46–69 m) towards the west of the damaged home, extensive EF2 tree damage was observed. The tornado continued to intensify as it approached and nearly paralleled Rock Springs Road, where a single-wide manufactured home was destroyed, and had remaining debris blown 50–75 yards (46–69 m) away from its original location. Winds in this area were estimated to have reached 120 mph (190 km/h). The most extreme damage occurred on McBridge Loop, where numerous large trees were snapped or uprooted next to a small lake. In this same location, a single-wide manufactured home was destroyed, with remaining debris from the home blown 50–75 yards (46–69 m) towards the northeast. The residents of the home were not present at the time the tornado hit. Winds in this area were also estimated to have reached 120 mph (190 km/h). Several nearby homes were left completely undamaged by the tornado.

The tornado continued towards the northeast at EF2 intensity as it crossed over Rock Springs Road once again, then followed Horshoe Bend Road towards the Tallapoosa River, and continued northeast, quickly moving across Horseshoe Bend National Military Park. Extensive EF2 tree damage occurred in this area, especially on the southwestern and northeastern sides of the park property. Near the battlefield site, numerous trees were snapped and uprooted, blocking the Loop Tour Road, and causing damage to outbuildings and a pavilion. The most extensive tree damage in this area occurred on the northeastern side of the park, where countless of trees were snapped or uprooted, and very few trees remained standing. A wooded area south of County Road 79 and north of the Tallapoosa River was revisited days after the tornado occurred, where numerous timber damage was documented. This area was where the tornado reached its peak in intensity. The tornado had caused a 500–600 yards (460–550 m) wide area snapped pines and hardwood trees, with several hardwood trees being debarked. The damage in this areas was estimated to have been EF3 intensity damage with winds up to 140 mph (230 km/h). The tornado continued towards the northeast while weakening, and would approach and hit the community of Daviston. In Daviston, both EF0 and EF1 damage occurred to trees. A couple barns and outbuildings sustained heavy damage as well along County Road 79. The tornado would dissipate after moving through Motley Road and Lil Beaver Road.

Overall, the tornado was rated EF3 with winds up to 140 miles per hour (230 km/h), traveled for a total 20.45 miles (32.91 km), and had a maximum width of 800 yards (730 m).

== Non-tornadic effects ==
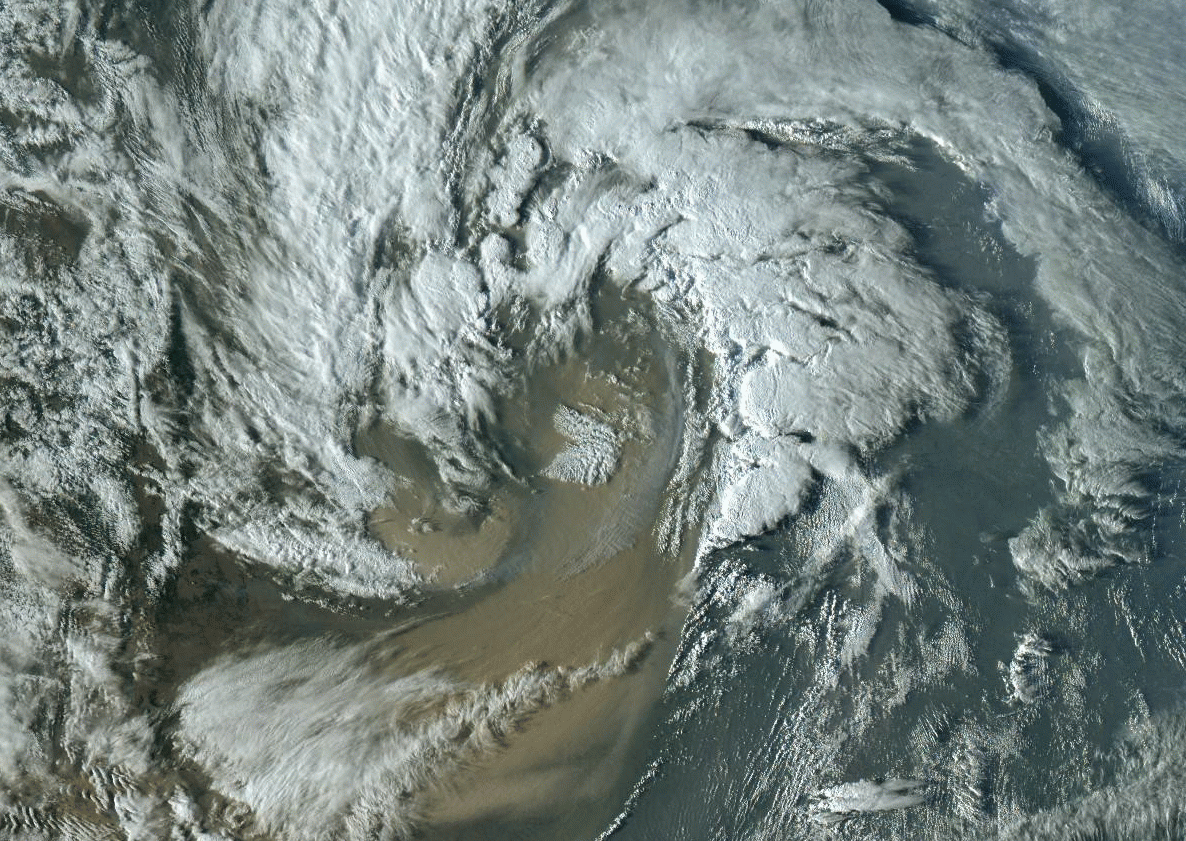
The system responsible for the outbreak, seen centered over Kansas on March 14

=== Winter storm ===
==== California ====
Very heavy snow fell in the Sierra Nevada of California on March 12 and 13, with the highest snowfall being 32 inches (81 cm) at Bear Valley. Multiple car crashes due to snow were recorded on I-80. Heavy rain caused mudslides in Southern California, with six rescues being conducted in San Jacinto.

==== Minnesota ====
Following record-breaking high temperatures achieved the previous day, heavy snow and blizzard conditions were expected across much of Minnesota starting on March 15. The heaviest snow was expected to occur on the northwestern quadrant of the cyclone, specifically across central and western Minnesota, where snowfall rates were expected to exceed 1 in (2.5 cm) per hour.

=== Fire weather and dust storms ===
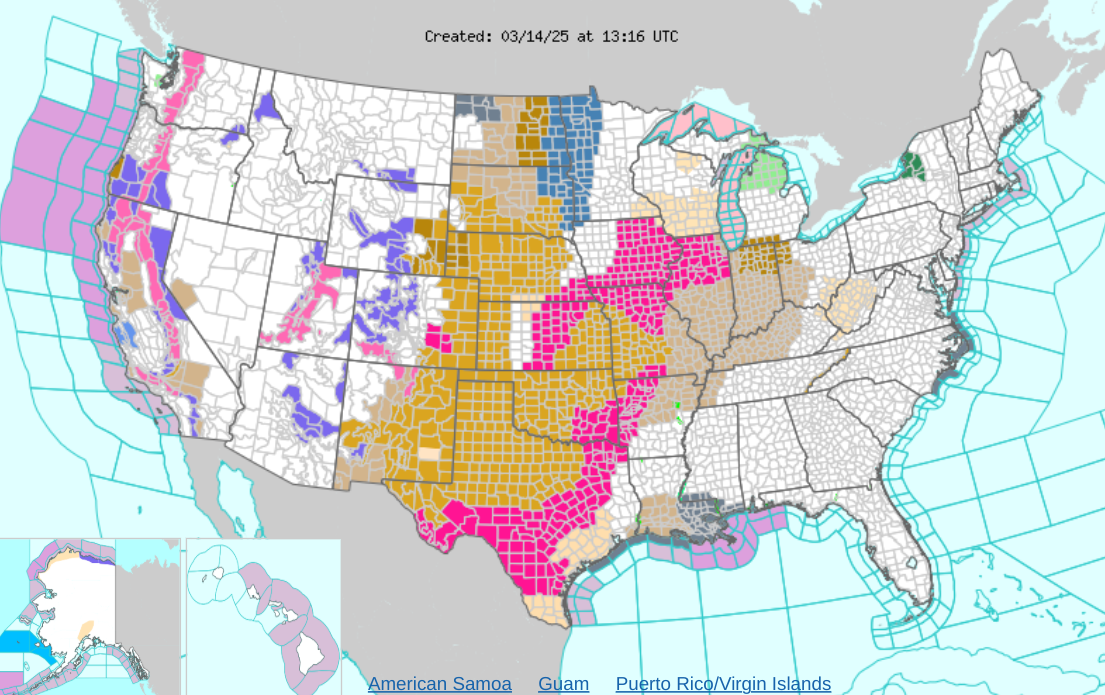
Widespread non-severe products, specifically wind advisories (dark beige), red flag warnings (magenta), and high wind warnings (bronze), were issued across the continental United States by the morning of March 14, 2025

An extremely critical risk for fire weather was issued over much of the Southern Plains, including much of western Texas, eastern New Mexico, and central Oklahoma, as the trough was expected to produce widespread sustained winds of 30–40 mph (48–64 km/h), including frequent gusts of 50–70 mph (80–113 km/h) and occasionally up to 80 mph (130 km/h), over an area of low relative humidity. Leedey, Oklahoma was put under an evacuation notice due to a rapidly spreading wildfire. Students at Oklahoma State University were told to shelter in place due to a wildfire. Fires were reported in nine counties across Oklahoma, including Oklahoma County and much of the Oklahoma City metropolitan area. One person in the state was killed in a car crash due to smoke, and at least 170,000 acres of land were burned. In total, 142 injuries and four fatalities were reported due to fires and high winds.

Four people were killed and multiple people were injured in car crashes near Amarillo, Texas as a dust storm hit the area. Over 100,000 power outages were reported in Texas and Oklahoma.

Another dust storm caused a multiple-vehicle collision on I-70 between Colby and Goodland, Kansas, when visibility was reduced to "near zero". At least 71 vehicles were involved, eight people were killed, and at least thirty were injured. I-70 was temporarily closed while crews removed debris from the area.

Dust and smoke caused particularly poor air quality in Kansas City, Missouri.

== Impacts and aftermath ==
Casualties by state
State	Deaths	Injuries
Alabama	3	"multiple"
Arkansas	3	≥32
Kansas	8	≥30
Mississippi	6	29
Missouri	12	"several"
Oklahoma	4	142
Texas	4	"multiple"
North Carolina	2	8
Total	43+	247+

The "Wearin' of the Green" parade in Baton Rouge, Louisiana was postponed by one day due to the expected severe weather. Due to high non-thunderstorm winds, over 400 flights were cancelled at Dallas Fort Worth International Airport. Around 20% of flights at Lubbock Preston Smith International Airport were also canceled.

In Rolla, Missouri, significant damage occurred to eight businesses at a strip mall. Strong storms caused a roof collapse at a business in Canton, Illinois. Numerous signs were knocked over in Hanna City, Illinois. Heavy tree damage occurred in Elgin, Illinois, and four tornadoes were confirmed across the Chicago Metropolitan Area on the overnight of the 14–15, with over 500,000 Commonwealth Edison customers losing power. By 7:30 p.m. on the 15th, 99% of these outages were resolved.

In Mississippi, widespread tornado damage occurred, with Governor of Mississippi Tate Reeves stating that "Grenada County was the hardest hit", with major damage occurring in Elliott and Gore Springs.

On March 17, days after the peak of the outbreak, ABC reported that the office of the Storm Prediction Center in Norman, Oklahoma, which had provided forecasts throughout the outbreak, was listed as a property to be terminated by the Department of Government Efficiency, an executive branch entity headed by Elon Musk. Tom Cole, the Republican representative for Oklahoma's 4th congressional district, stated that he had intervened in the matter and the office would not be closed; despite this, the office still appeared on the list of properties facing lease termination.

The Guardian reported that Arkansas' request for federal aid following severe weather throughout March 2025 had been denied by Donald Trump, and that Arkansas legislators signed a letter requesting a review of the decision on April 21. The Guardian linked this event to Trump's prior calls to dismantle the Federal Emergency Management Agency.

== See also ==
- Weather of 2025
- List of F3, EF3, and IF3 tornadoes (2020–present)
- List of F4, EF4, and IF4 tornadoes (2020–present)
- List of North American tornadoes and tornado outbreaks
- List of Storm Prediction Center high risk days
- List of United States tornadoes from January to March 2025
- List of tornado emergencies
- March 1997 tornado outbreak – A tornado outbreak which produced multiple F4 tornadoes across mainly Arkansas
- 2008 Super Tuesday tornado outbreak – Another devastating tornado outbreak that occurred around the same regions
  - 2008 Atkins-Clinton tornado – A long-track EF4 tornado that also struck Stone, Izard and Sharp counties in northern Arkansas
- 2010 New Year's Eve tornado outbreak – A similar tornado outbreak of a lesser scale occurred over the exact same areas
