= Diaz, Arkansas =

- City
- Location of Diaz in Jackson County, Arkansas.
- Coordinates: 35°38′40″N 91°15′41″W
- Country: United States
- State: Arkansas
- County: Jackson

Area
  - Total: 5.94 sq mi (15.39 km^{2})
  - Land: 5.92 sq mi (15.33 km^{2})
  - Water: 0.023 sq mi (0.06 km^{2})
- Elevation: 233 ft (71 m)

Population (2020)
  - Total: 1,224
  - Estimate (2025): 1,200 ▼
  - Density: 206.8/sq mi (79.84/km^{2})
- Time zone: UTC-6 (Central (CST))
  - Summer (DST): UTC-5 (CDT)
- ZIP code: 72043
- Area code: 870
- FIPS code: 05-18940
- GNIS feature ID: 2404225

Diaz (/ˈdaɪæz/ DYE-az) is a city in Jackson County, Arkansas, United States. The population was 1,224 at the 2020 census.

== History ==
During the overnight hours of March 14–15, 2025, a violent EF4 tornado with wind speeds of up to 190 miles per hour destroyed homes north of the town.

== Geography ==
According to the United States Census Bureau, the city has a total area of 5.9 square miles (15 km^{2}), of which 5.9 square miles (15 km^{2}) is land and 0.04 square miles (0.10 km^{2}) (0.34%) is water.

== Demographics ==
Historical population
Census	Pop.	Note	%±
1960	348		—
1970	283		−18.7%
1980	1,192		321.2%
1990	1,363		14.3%
2000	1,284		−5.8%
2010	1,318		2.6%
2020	1,224		−7.1%
2025 (est.)	1,200	▼	−2.0%
U.S. Decennial Census

=== 2020 census ===
Diaz racial composition
Race	Number	Percentage
White (non-Hispanic)	802	65.52%
Black or African American (non-Hispanic)	299	24.43%
Native American	1	0.08%
Other/Mixed	70	5.72%
Hispanic or Latino	52	4.25%

As of the 2020 census, Diaz had a population of 1,224.

The median age was 37.1 years. 29.2% of residents were under the age of 18 and 14.2% were 65 years of age or older. For every 100 females, there were 87.2 males, and for every 100 females age 18 and over, there were 86.9 males.

47.2% of residents lived in urban areas, while 52.8% lived in rural areas.

There were 484 households in Diaz, of which 34.7% had children under the age of 18 living in them. Of all households, 40.9% were married-couple households, 20.2% were households with a male householder and no spouse or partner present, and 31.8% were households with a female householder and no spouse or partner present. About 28.5% of all households were made up of individuals and 11.1% had someone living alone who was 65 years of age or older.

There were 538 housing units, of which 10.0% were vacant. The homeowner vacancy rate was 0.7% and the rental vacancy rate was 6.5%.

=== 2000 census ===
As of the census of 2000, there were 1,284 people, 465 households, and 365 families residing in the city. The population density was 216.8 inhabitants per square mile (83.7/km^{2}). There were 552 housing units at an average density of 93.2 per square mile (36.0/km^{2}). The racial makeup of the city was 69.63% White, 28.35% Black or African American, 0.47% Native American, 0.55% from other races, and 1.01% from two or more races. 1.17% of the population were Hispanic or Latino of any race.

There were 465 households, out of which 38.7% had children under the age of 18 living with them, 55.5% were married couples living together, 18.1% had a female householder with no husband present, and 21.3% were non-families. 18.5% of all households were made up of individuals, and 6.2% had someone living alone who was 65 years of age or older. The average household size was 2.76 and the average family size was 3.15.

In the city, the population was spread out, with 30.5% under the age of 18, 8.6% from 18 to 24, 30.5% from 25 to 44, 20.9% from 45 to 64, and 9.5% who were 65 years of age or older. The median age was 33 years. For every 100 females, there were 91.4 males. For every 100 females age 18 and over, there were 87.4 males.

The median income for a household in the city was $34,792, and the median income for a family was $38,646. Males had a median income of $31,339 versus $19,853 for females. The per capita income for the city was $15,867. About 11.7% of families and 14.6% of the population were below the poverty line, including 20.5% of those under age 18 and 17.1% of those age 65 or over.

== Education ==
Diaz is divided between the Newport School District and the Jackson County School District.

The portion of what is now the Diaz CDP that is in the Jackson County district was formerly in the Tuckerman School District. On July 1, 1993, that district merged into the Jackson County district.
