= Swifton, Arkansas =

- Location of Swifton in Jackson County, Arkansas.
- Coordinates: 35°49′27″N 91°7′44″W
- Country: United States
- State: Arkansas
- County: Jackson

Area
  - Total: 0.54 sq mi (1.40 km^{2})
  - Land: 0.54 sq mi (1.40 km^{2})
  - Water: 0 sq mi (0.00 km^{2})
- Elevation: 246 ft (75 m)

Population (2020)
  - Total: 733
  - Estimate (2025): 709 ▼
  - Density: 1,355.1/sq mi (523.19/km^{2})
- Time zone: UTC-6 (Central (CST))
  - Summer (DST): UTC-5 (CDT)
- ZIP code: 72471
- Area code: 870
- FIPS code: 05-68360
- GNIS feature ID: 2405555

Swifton is a city in Jackson County, Arkansas, United States. As of the 2020 census, Swifton had a population of 733. Swifton was the hometown of Baseball Hall of Famer George Kell.

== Geography ==
According to the United States Census Bureau, the city has a total area of 0.54 square miles (1.4 km^{2}), all land.

== Demographics ==
Historical population
Census	Pop.	Note	%±
1880	56		—
1900	206		—
1910	290		40.8%
1920	450		55.2%
1930	488		8.4%
1940	484		−0.8%
1950	539		11.4%
1960	601		11.5%
1970	703		17.0%
1980	859		22.2%
1990	830		−3.4%
2000	871		4.9%
2010	798		−8.4%
2020	733		−8.1%
2025 (est.)	709	▼	−3.3%
U.S. Decennial Census

=== 2020 census ===
Swifton racial composition
Race	Number	Percentage
White (non-Hispanic)	672	91.68%
Black or African American (non-Hispanic)	18	2.46%
Native American	3	0.41%
Other/Mixed	30	4.09%
Hispanic or Latino	10	1.36%

As of the 2020 United States census, there were 733 people, 374 households, and 237 families residing in the city.

=== 2000 census ===
As of the census of 2000, there were 871 people, 335 households, and 245 families residing in the city. The population density was 1,752.3 inhabitants per square mile (676.6/km^{2}). There were 365 housing units at an average density of 734.3 per square mile (283.5/km^{2}). The racial makeup of the city was 97.93% White, 0.46% Black or African American, 0.11% Native American, 1.03% from other races, and 0.46% from two or more races. 2.30% of the population were Hispanic or Latino of any race.

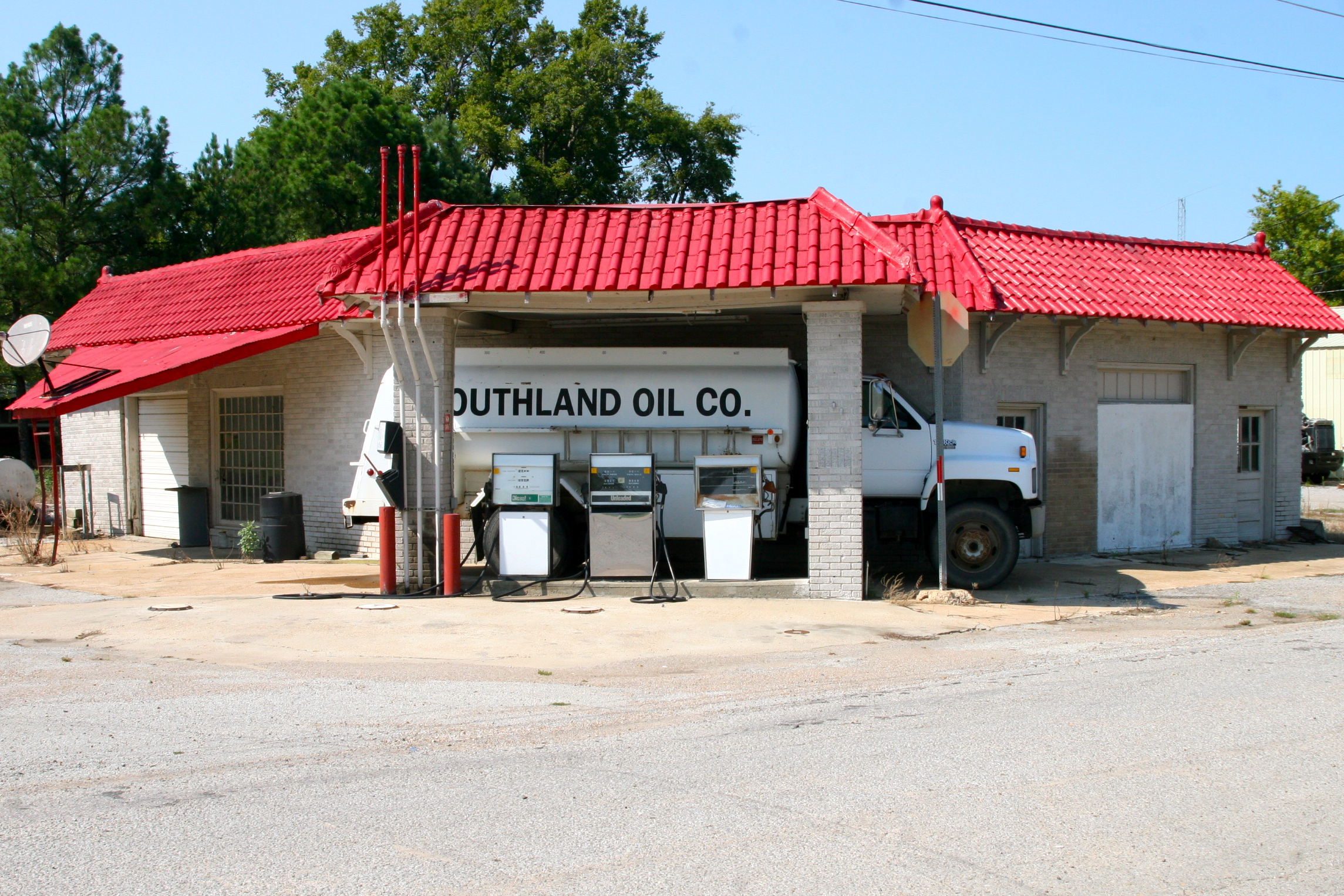
This Phillips 66 station in Swifton is listed on the National Register of Historic Places

There were 335 households, out of which 34.3% had children under the age of 18 living with them, 55.5% were married couples living together, 13.1% had a female householder with no husband present, and 26.6% were non-families. 25.1% of all households were made up of individuals, and 11.6% had someone living alone who was 65 years of age or older. The average household size was 2.60 and the average family size was 3.09.

In the city, the population was spread out, with 28.0% under the age of 18, 7.7% from 18 to 24, 28.1% from 25 to 44, 22.5% from 45 to 64, and 13.7% who were 65 years of age or older. The median age was 35 years. For every 100 females, there were 90.2 males. For every 100 females age 18 and over, there were 91.7 males.

The median income for a household in the city was $24,375, and the median income for a family was $31,375. Males had a median income of $22,500, versus $15,682 for females. The per capita income for the city was $11,922. About 17.5% of families and 22.9% of the population were below the poverty line, including 34.3% of those under age 18 and 24.0% of those age 65 or over.

== Education ==
It is within the Jackson County School District. Tuckerman Elementary School, Swifton Middle School, and Tuckerman High School are the district schools.

On July 1, 2004, the Swifton School District was merged into the Jackson County School District.

== Notable people ==
- William P. Bowden, retired major general of the United States Air Force
- George Kell, Major League Baseball player, member of Baseball Hall of Fame
- Skeeter Kell, Major League baseball player
- Bobby Winkles, Major League and college baseball manager, raised in Swifton
