= Campbell Station, Arkansas =

- City
- Location of Campbell Station in Jackson County, Arkansas.
- Coordinates: 35°40′05″N 91°14′51″W
- Country: United States
- State: Arkansas
- County: Jackson

Area
  - Total: 1.70 sq mi (4.41 km^{2})
  - Land: 1.70 sq mi (4.41 km^{2})
  - Water: 0 sq mi (0.00 km^{2})
- Elevation: 233 ft (71 m)

Population (2020)
  - Total: 232
  - Estimate (2025): 218 ▼
  - Density: 136.3/sq mi (52.61/km^{2})
- Time zone: UTC-6 (Central (CST))
  - Summer (DST): UTC-5 (CDT)
- FIPS code: 05-10900
- GNIS feature ID: 2403981

Campbell Station is a city in Jackson County, Arkansas, United States. The population was 232 at the 2020 census.

== Geography ==
According to the United States Census Bureau, the town has a total area of 4.5 km^{2} (1.7 sq mi), all land.

== Demographics ==
Historical population
Census	Pop.	Note	%±
1960	140		—
1970	218		55.7%
1980	297		36.2%
1990	247		−16.8%
2000	228		−7.7%
2010	255		11.8%
2020	232		−9.0%
2025 (est.)	218	▼	−6.0%
U.S. Decennial Census; 2014 Estimate

As of the census of 2000, there were 228 people, 94 households, and 72 families residing in the town. The population density was 50.9 people /km^{2} (132 people/mi^{2}). There were 100 housing units at an average density of 22.3 units /km^{2} (58 units/mi^{2}). The racial makeup of the town was 96.93% White, 2.63% Black or African American and 0.44% Native American.

There were 94 households, out of which 25.5% had children under the age of 18 living with them, 60.6% were married couples living together, 6.4% had a female householder with no husband present, and 23.4% were non-families. 23.4% of all households were made up of individuals, and 8.5% had someone living alone who was 65 years of age or older. The average household size was 2.43 and the average family size was 2.82.

In the town the population was spread out, with 19.7% under the age of 18, 7.9% from 18 to 24, 32.9% from 25 to 44, 28.9% from 45 to 64, and 10.5% who were 65 years of age or older. The median age was 40 years. For every 100 females, there were 107.3 males. For every 100 females age 18 and over, there were 98.9 males.

The median income for a household in the town was $37,778, and the median income for a family was $38,472. Males had a median income of $31,500 versus $21,146 for females. The per capita income for the town was $16,110. About 9.4% of families and 10.7% of the population were below the poverty line, including 23.4% of those under the age of eighteen and 3.8% of those 65 or over.

== Education ==
It is in the Jackson County School District.

It was formerly in the Tuckerman School District. On July 1, 1993, that district merged into the Jackson County district.
