= Grubbs, Arkansas =

- City
- Location of Grubbs in Jackson County, Arkansas.
- Coordinates: 35°39′14″N 91°04′32″W
- Country: United States
- State: Arkansas
- County: Jackson

Area
  - Total: 0.57 sq mi (1.47 km^{2})
  - Land: 0.57 sq mi (1.47 km^{2})
  - Water: 0 sq mi (0.00 km^{2})
- Elevation: 230 ft (70 m)

Population (2020)
  - Total: 301
  - Estimate (2025): 299 ▼
  - Density: 531.3/sq mi (205.15/km^{2})
- Time zone: UTC-6 (Central (CST))
  - Summer (DST): UTC-5 (CDT)
- ZIP code: 72431
- Area code: 870
- FIPS code: 05-29020
- GNIS feature ID: 2403766

Grubbs is a city in Jackson County, Arkansas, United States. As of the 2020 census, Grubbs had a population of 301.

== Geography ==
According to the United States Census Bureau, the town has a total area of 1.4 km^{2} (0.54 sq mi), all land.

== Demographics ==
Historical population
Census	Pop.	Note	%±
1910	178		—
1920	300		68.5%
1930	366		22.0%
1940	345		−5.7%
1950	313		−9.3%
1960	360		15.0%
1970	442		22.8%
1980	546		23.5%
1990	528		−3.3%
2000	438		−17.0%
2010	386		−11.9%
2020	301		−22.0%
2025 (est.)	299	▼	−0.7%
U.S. Decennial Census

As of the census of 2000, there were 438 people, 186 households, and 135 families residing in the town. The population density was 307.5 people/km^{2} (796 people/mi^{2}). There were 213 housing units at an average density of 149.5 units/km^{2} (387 units/mi^{2}). The racial makeup of the town was 94.52% White, and 5.48% from two or more races. 0.68% of the population were Hispanic or Latino of any race.

There were 186 households, out of which 24.2% had children under the age of 18 living with them, 62.9% were married couples living together, 7.5% had a female householder with no husband present, and 27.4% were non-families. 25.8% of all households were made up of individuals, and 15.1% had someone living alone who was 65 years of age or older. The average household size was 2.35 and the average family size was 2.80.

In the town the population was spread out, with 18.3% under the age of 18, 9.4% from 18 to 24, 26.0% from 25 to 44, 26.5% from 45 to 64, and 19.9% who were 65 years of age or older. The median age was 41 years. For every 100 females, there were 102.8 males. For every 100 females age 18 and over, there were 103.4 males.

The median income for a household in the town was $23,929, and the median income for a family was $33,036. Males had a median income of $26,125 versus $17,500 for females. The per capita income for the town was $11,809. About 11.9% of families and 15.6% of the population were below the poverty line, including 10.6% of those under age 18 and 30.7% of those age 65 or over.

== Education ==
Jackson County School District serves the community. The school district formed on July 1, 1993, due to the merger of the Tuckerman School District and the Grubbs School District.
