= Jackson County School District (Arkansas) =

School district in Arkansas, United States

Address
- 300 North Dowell Avenue Tuckerman, Arkansas, 72473; United States

District information
- Type: Public
- Grades: PreK–12
- NCES District ID: 0513230

Students and staff
- Students: 938
- Teachers: 93.61
- Staff: 53.8
- Student–teacher ratio: 10.02

Other information
- Website: bulldogs.k12.ar.us

Jackson County School District (JCSD) is a school district in Jackson County, Arkansas, headquartered in Tuckerman. It serves Tuckerman, Campbell Station, Grubbs, Swifton, and a portion of Diaz.

It operates Tuckerman Elementary School, Swifton Middle School, and Tuckerman High School. The district's mascot is the bulldog.

It formed on July 1, 1993, due to the merger of the Tuckerman School District and the Grubbs School District. On July 1, 2004, the Swifton School District was merged into the Jackson County School District.
