= Tuckerman Water Tower =

- U.S. National Register of Historic Places
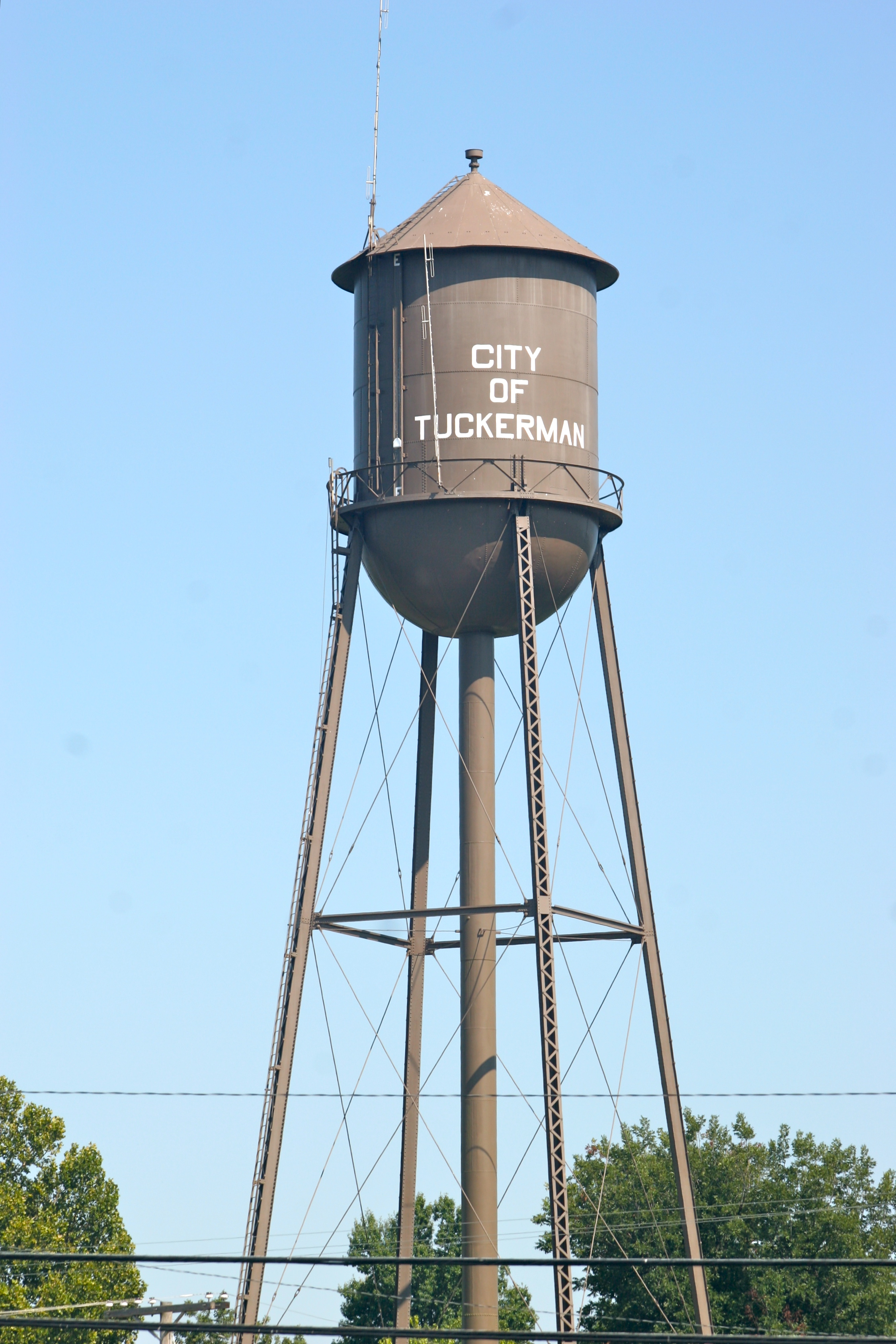

- Location within Arkansas Location within the United States
- Location: South End of Front St., Tuckerman, Arkansas
- Coordinates: 35°43′46″N 91°12′1″W
- Area: less than one acre
- Built: 1935
- Architectural style: Plain-Traditional
- MPS: New Deal Recovery Efforts in Arkansas MPS
- NRHP reference No.: 07000443
- Added to NRHP: May 22, 2007

The Tuckerman Water Tower is a historic waterworks facility at the south end of Front Street in Tuckerman, Arkansas. It is a tall metal structure, with four latticed legs, braced with rods and sloping inward, to support a water tank that is bowl-shaped at the bottom and topped by a conical roof. A pipe traverses the center of the tower for the movement of water to and from the tank. Built in 1935 with funding support from the Depression-era Public Works Administration (PWA), it is the only remaining PWA tower of its type in the county.

The tower was listed on the National Register of Historic Places in 2007.

== See also ==
- National Register of Historic Places listings in Jackson County, Arkansas
