= Swifton School District =

Defunct school district in Arkansas, United States

Swifton School District No. 33 was a school district headquartered in Swifton, Arkansas. It had a single school, the Swifton School.

Circa 2000 it had 300 students.

On July 1, 2004, the Swifton School District was merged into the Jackson County School District.
