= William P. Bowden =

United States Air Force general

- Born: 1932 (age 93–94); Swifton, Arkansas, U.S.
- Military career
- Branch: United States Air Force
- Service years: 1954–1989
- Rank: Major general

William P. Bowden (born 1932) is a retired major general of the United States Air Force.

== Early life ==
Bowden was born in Swifton, Arkansas, in 1932 and graduated from Swifton High School in 1950. He attended the University of Arkansas in Fayetteville graduating in 1954 with a Bachelor of Science degree and then went on to graduate from George Washington University with a master's degree in Business Administration and Auburn University with a master's degree in Political Science (US Air Force web site, Bio #4748). Bowden received his military commission through the Reserve Officer Training Corps program at the University of Arkansas in 1954.

== Military career ==
Bowden's professional military education included Air Command and Staff College and the Air War College. He also served as a faculty instructor and chief of the Curriculum Planning Division at the Air War College. Bowden is a master navigator with more than 4,500 flying hours. His military decorations and awards include the Distinguished Service Medal, Legion of Merit, Meritorious Service Medal, Air Medal with Oak Leaf Cluster and Air Force Commendation Medal, (US Air Force Web site, Bio #4748). Bowden was also awarded the U.S. Air Force Association's Thomas P. Gerrity Award for Excellence in Logistics Management. General Bowden's command accomplishments include being named as assistant deputy chief of staff, logistics operations, Headquarters Air Force Logistics Command, Wright-Patterson Air Force Base, Ohio, in 1980. In 1981, Bowden was assigned to Air Force headquarters as deputy director for logistics plans and programs, and in 1982 being named director for logistics plans and operations. In 1983, Bowden was named as Air Force Logistics Command's deputy chief of staff for logistics operations (US Air Force Web site, Bio # 4748). In 1984, Bowden was named chief of staff for Air Force Logistics Command. Bowden retired from the United States Air Force in 1989. In 2005, Bowden was inducted into the Oklahoma Military Hall of Fame honoring him for his dedicated service to the United States Air Force.
