= Tuckerman High School =

Location
- 300 North Dowell Street; Tuckerman, Arkansas; United States
- Coordinates: 35°36′4″N 91°16′22″W

Information
- Type: Public
- School district: Jackson County School District
- NCES School ID: 051323001083
- Faculty: 23.40 (on FTE basis)
- Grades: 8–12
- Enrollment: 310 (2010-11)
- Student to teacher ratio: 11.25
- Colors: Red and white
- Athletics conference: 2A Region 2
- Mascot: Bulldog
- Team name: Tuckerman Bulldogs
- Website: www.bulldogs.k12.ar.us

Tuckerman High School is a comprehensive public high school serving students in grades 8 through 12 in Tuckerman, Arkansas, United States. It is the sole high school administered by the Jackson County School District.

== Academics ==
The assumed course of study follows the Smart Core curriculum developed by the Arkansas Department of Education (ADE). Students engage in regular and Advanced Placement (AP) coursework and exams to obtain the 22 units required by the Smart Core curriculum. Exceptional students have been recognized as National Merit Finalists and have participated in the Arkansas Governor's School.

== Athletics ==
The school's mascot is the Bulldog with red and white as the school colors.

The Tuckerman Bulldogs have competed in the state's 2A classification within the 2A Region 2 Conference of the Arkansas Activities Association (AAA) since 2020. The Bulldogs engage in numerous interscholastic activities, including baseball, basketball (boys/girls), golf, softball, and dance.

In 1992, Tuckerman won a state baseball championship behind its 31-4 record and finished as a state finalist in basketball. Both teams were led by legendary coach Morgan Gilbert, who has become a popular mainstay at the school since 1974 while amassing more than 1,000 victories in both baseball and basketball, mostly at Tuckerman. Gilbert is the state's only 1,000 game winning coach in baseball and one of six basketball coaches to do so.
