= Tuckerman, Arkansas =

Tuckerman
- City
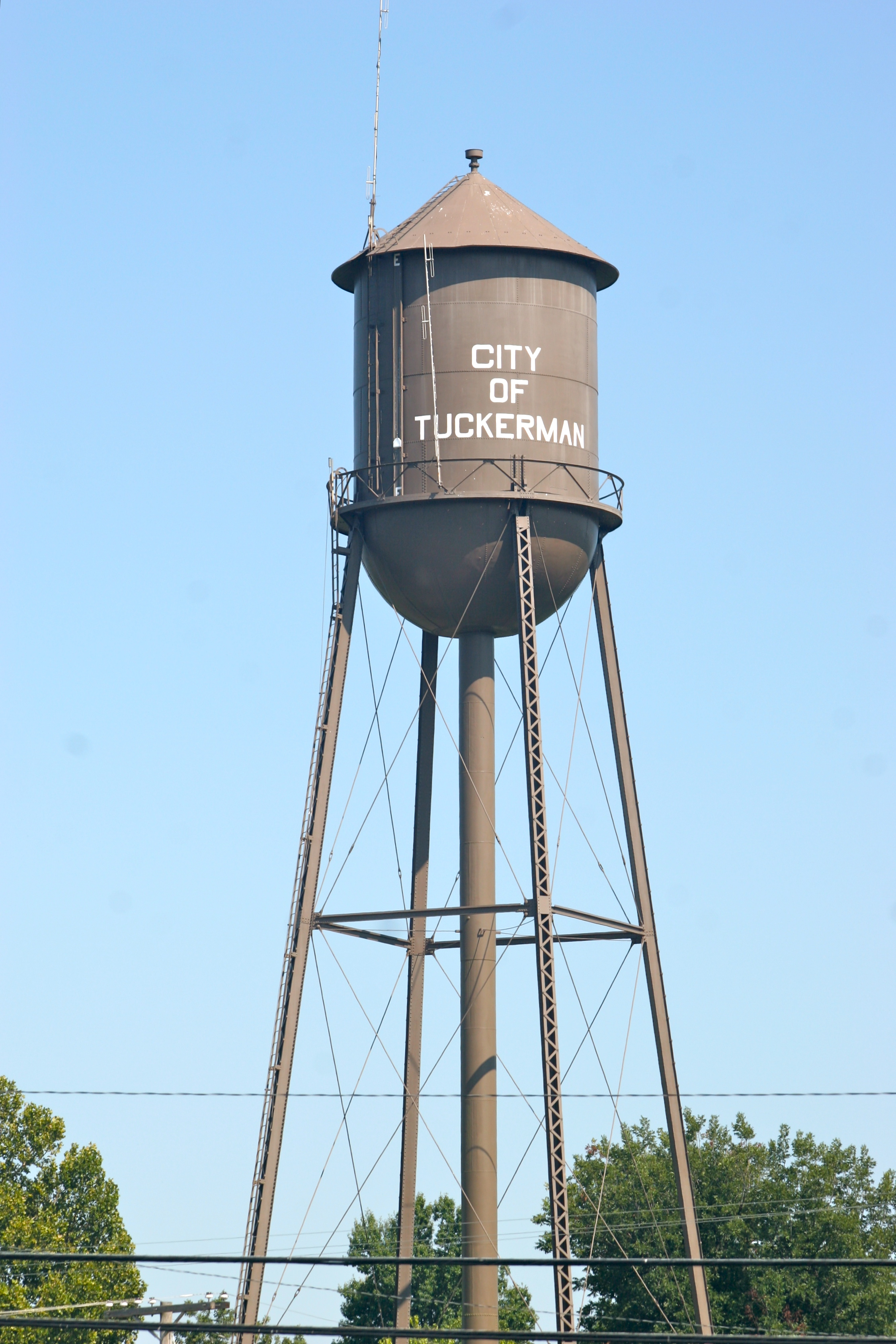
- The Tuckerman Water Tower is listed on the National Register of Historic Places

- Location of Tuckerman in Jackson County, Arkansas.
- Coordinates: 35°43′33″N 91°12′06″W
- Country: United States
- State: Arkansas
- County: Jackson
- Established: 1891

Government
  - Type: Interim Mayor
  - Mayor: Zack Graham

Area
  - Total: 2.68 sq mi (6.94 km^{2})
  - Land: 2.68 sq mi (6.93 km^{2})
  - Water: 0.0039 sq mi (0.01 km^{2})
- Elevation: 246 ft (75 m)

Population (2020)
  - Total: 1,707
  - Estimate (2025): 1,649 ▼
  - Density: 637.8/sq mi (246.25/km^{2})
- Time zone: UTC-6 (Central (CST))
  - Summer (DST): UTC-5 (CDT)
- ZIP code: 72473
- Area code: 870
- FIPS code: 05-70100
- GNIS feature ID: 2405609
- Website: http://www.tuckermanar.net

Tuckerman is a city in Jackson County, Arkansas, United States. As of the 2020 census, Tuckerman had a population of 1,707.

== Geography ==
According to the United States Census Bureau, the city has a total area of 2.9 square miles (7.6 km^{2}), of which 0.008 square miles (0.02 km^{2}), or 0.22%, is water.

== Demographics ==
Historical population
Census	Pop.	Note	%±
1900	260		—
1910	583		124.2%
1920	778		33.4%
1930	938		20.6%
1940	875		−6.7%
1950	1,253		43.2%
1960	1,539		22.8%
1970	1,731		12.5%
1980	2,078		20.0%
1990	2,020		−2.8%
2000	1,757		−13.0%
2010	1,862		6.0%
2020	1,707		−8.3%
2025 (est.)	1,649	▼	−3.4%
U.S. Decennial Census

=== 2020 census ===
As of the 2020 census, Tuckerman had a population of 1,707. There were 730 households and 537 families in the city. The median age was 39.0 years. 25.2% of residents were under the age of 18 and 17.4% were 65 years of age or older. For every 100 females, there were 94.4 males, and for every 100 females age 18 and over, there were 88.2 males.

Of the city's 730 households, 30.0% had children under the age of 18 living in them. Of all households, 41.8% were married-couple households, 20.8% had a male householder with no spouse or partner present, and 31.6% had a female householder with no spouse or partner present. About 33.8% of all households were made up of individuals, and 16.2% had someone living alone who was 65 years of age or older.

There were 798 housing units, of which 8.5% were vacant. The homeowner vacancy rate was 2.6% and the rental vacancy rate was 4.3%.

0.0% of residents lived in urban areas, while 100.0% lived in rural areas.

Tuckerman racial composition
Race	Number	Percentage
White (non-Hispanic)	1,537	90.04%
Black or African American (non-Hispanic)	79	4.63%
Native American	3	0.18%
Asian	1	0.06%
Other/Mixed	61	3.57%
Hispanic or Latino	26	1.52%

=== 2000 census ===
As of the census of 2000, there were 1,757 people, 769 households, and 519 families residing in the city. The population density was 830.0 inhabitants per square mile (320.5/km^{2}). There were 834 housing units at an average density of 394.0 per square mile (152.1/km^{2}). The racial makeup of the city was 89.70% White, 8.71% Black or African American, 0.80% Native American, and 0.80% from two or more races. 0.91% of the population were Hispanic or Latino of any race.

There were 769 households, out of which 25.9% had children under the age of 18 living with them, 50.3% were married couples living together, 13.5% had a female householder with no husband present, and 32.5% were non-families. 30.7% of all households were made up of individuals, and 17.8% had someone living alone who was 65 years of age or older. The average household size was 2.28 and the average family size was 2.83.

In the city, the population was spread out, with 22.6% under the age of 18, 7.5% from 18 to 24, 26.5% from 25 to 44, 23.7% from 45 to 64, and 19.6% who were 65 years of age or older. The median age was 41 years. For every 100 females, there were 87.1 males. For every 100 females age 18 and over, there were 87.6 males.

The median income for a household in the city was $27,000, and the median income for a family was $33,512. Males had a median income of $27,750 versus $19,621 for females. The per capita income for the city was $13,803. About 10.8% of families and 14.2% of the population were below the poverty line, including 13.5% of those under age 18 and 19.8% of those age 65 or over.

== Education ==
Tuckerman is the home of the Jackson County School District and Tuckerman High School. The school district formed on July 1, 1993, due to the merger of the Tuckerman School District and the Grubbs School District.

== Notable people ==
- Jim Barnes, basketball player, Olympic gold medalist, top pick of 1964 NBA draft.
- Bobby Winkles, baseball coach at Arizona State University and in Major League Baseball.
