= 2008 Atkins–Clinton tornado =

2008 tornado in Arkansas, U.S.

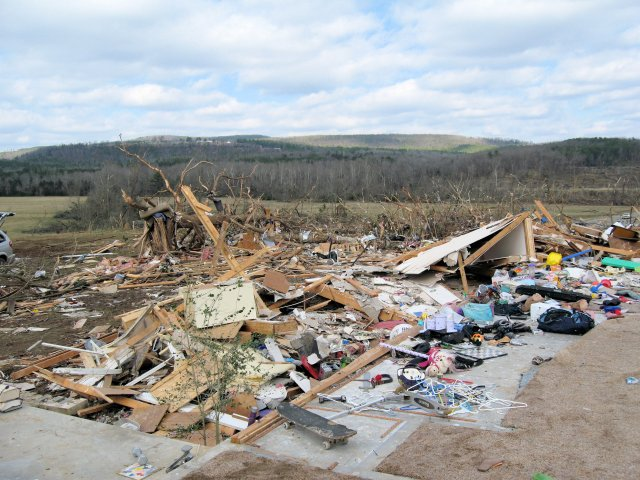
- Clockwise from top: The tornado as it was in Izard County, NEXRAD loop of the tornado and its parent supercell, a view looking over a home that was destroyed

Meteorological history
- Formed: February 5, 2008, 4:49 p.m. CST (UTC–06:00)
- Dissipated: February 5, 2008, 6:56 p.m. CST (UTC–06:00)
- Duration: 2 hours, 7 minutes

EF4 tornado
- on the Enhanced Fujita scale
- Max width: 1,320 yards (0.75 mi; 1.21 km)
- Path length: 121.84 miles (196.08 km)
- Highest winds: 166–200 mph (267–322 km/h)

Overall effects
- Fatalities: 13
- Injuries: 140
- Damage: $119.31 million (2008 USD)
- Areas affected: Atkins, Happy Bend, Cleveland, Clinton, Mountain View, Zion and Highland, Arkansas
- Part of the 2008 Super Tuesday tornado outbreak and Tornadoes of 2008

During the late afternoon and evening hours of February 5, 2008, a long-track and deadly EF4 tornado moved through central and northern Arkansas, impacting several towns and communities including Atkins, Clinton and Mountain View along a 122-mile (196 km) path. A total of 13 fatalities were recorded and 140 people were injured, making the tornado the deadliest in Arkansas since 1997, where another violent and deadly tornado impacted communities in central Arkansas and killed 15. The tornado was part of a larger tornado outbreak that took place during Super Tuesday 2008, and had the longest path of the outbreak.

The tornado first touched down in Yell County, intensifying into Pope County before impacting the community of Atkins at EF3 intensity, damaging or destroying several homes and killing five people. Maintaining intensity, the tornado tore through Conway County, destroying more homes and downing trees and power poles, killing two more people. The tornado became violent in Van Buren County, demolishing several homes and businesses near Clinton, killing an additional three people. Throughout Stone, Izard, and Sharp counties; several more homes and businesses were damaged or destroyed at EF3-EF4 intensity, trees and power poles were snapped and toppled, and more fatalities occurred before the tornado dissipated near Highland. The tornado was on the ground for 127 minutes, had a maximum width of 1320 yards (1.21 km) and traveled approximately 121.84 miles (196.08 km) through several counties and communities, making the path length the longest on record in Arkansas since 1950. Damage costs totaled an estimated $119.31 million. (Note: For consistency, all monetary figures are in 2008-adjusted United States dollars.)

== Meteorological synopsis ==
=== Background ===
Arkansas, particularly its eastern portion, is located in a region of the United States dubbed "Dixie Alley". This region is noted for its prevalence of destructive and violent tornadoes; the region is particularly deadly for tornado impacts.

=== Forecasting history ===
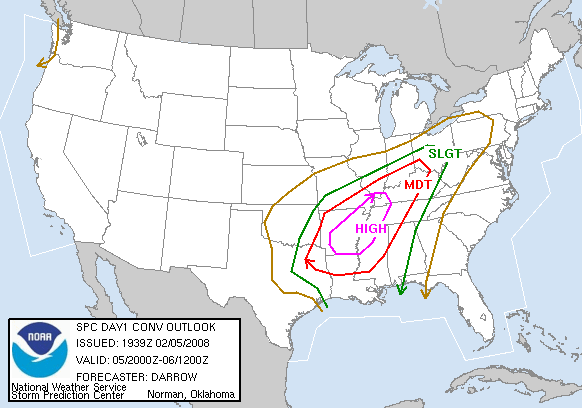
High-risk issued by the Storm Prediction Center, outlined for several states including most of Arkansas.

On February 1, the Storm Prediction Center (SPC) outlined a day 5 outlook for severe weather for most of the Southern United States and Ohio Valley. A large, upper-level trough was expected to develop over the Western United States on February 3 and was expected to traverse eastward towards the Ohio Valley on February 5. The Day 4 Convective Outlook, outlined by the SPC on February 2, denoted a 30% chance of severe weather within 25 miles of a given point covering much of the east-central United States, including the eastern half of Arkansas. The outlook noted that "both Global Forecast System (GFS) and European Centre for Medium–Range Weather Forecasts (EMCWF) [are] now in remarkable agreement with their depictions of major features Day 4 (Tuesday, February 5) - both at the surface and aloft". The Day 3 Convective Outlook outlined on February 3 profiled a "slight" risk of severe weather for much of the same area outlined the day prior, with a larger portion of Arkansas being included in the risk. The "slight" risk was accompanied by a 30% chance of severe weather stretching from Louisiana to Western Pennsylvania.

The updated Day 2 Convective Outlook on the morning of February 4 denoted a "moderate" risk for severe weather in the Mississippi River Delta, with far-eastern portions of Arkansas being included in the "moderate" risk. It was supplemented by a 45% "hatched" (Note: As defined by the Storm Prediction Center, a "hatched" area is a region with a "10% or greater probability of significant severe [weather] within 25 miles of a point.") risk for severe weather in areas covered by the moderate risk. North-Central Arkansas was included in a 15% risk of severe weather. A later update to the Day 2 Convective Outlook pushed the moderate risk region eastward and into much of Central and North Arkansas. The 45% "hatched" area that has been outlined in the morning hours was also pushed eastward into much of Arkansas. The SPC noted that "long-lived supercells will have potential for strong tornadoes over much of the moderate risk area thru the evening hours". The Day 1 Convective Outlook, outlined on the day of the tornado, maintained the moderate risk region for most of Arkansas and introduced a 15% "hatched" risk for tornadoes covering the West South Central and Gulf Coast regions, with an additional 15% risk for damaging wind and a 30% probability of large hail being outlined in the Mississippi River Valley and the Ozarks, respectively.

The 13:00 UTC update of the Day 1 Convective Outlook introduced a high risk area in the Ark-La-Miss region, including much of Arkansas. Additionally, an upgraded 30% chance of tornadoes, including the introduction of a "hatched" area, was denoted. The 16:30 UTC update further expanded the high risk area, stretching it northward into the Illinois–Indiana–Kentucky tri-state area. The 30% tornado risk was additionally pushed northward. The 20:00 UTC and 01:00 UTC updates maintained similar wording, with the latter noting that a "tornado outbreak [is] in progress over parts of the Mid-South and Lower Mississippi Valley".

== Tornado summary ==
The storm first produced a weak EF0 tornado west of Casa in Perry County. The second, much stronger tornado first touched down at 4:49 pm CST west of a property on County Loop Road 57 in Yell County, moving over a field to the northeast. It crossed County Road 57 and inflicted EF0 damage along Arkansas Highway 154; the tornado passed over Holla Bend National Wildlife Refuge and into Pope County a short distance northeast. The tornado only inflicted minor damage to trees in Yell County. It reached EF1 intensity east of Holla Bend, crossing Carden Bottoms Road and later the Arkansas River west of Galla Rock. The tornado widened to 0.5 miles (0.80 km) while retaining EF1 intensity; the first fatality occurred where the first point of EF2 damage, along South Shore Road, was denoted. At this location, a mobile home was destroyed, with an occupant being severely injured and later dying as a result. The tornado moved parallel to Bluebird Lane and clipping the eastern portions of Lake Atkins. On Lucky Landing Road the tornado deroofed several homes and almost destroyed others.

=== Damage in Atkins ===
Aerial view of damage in the Atkins area

It reached EF3 intensity along 3rd Avenue Southeast north of Wilson, before weakening to EF2 intensity along Southeast 11th Street. As the tornado moved through the southeastern portions of Atkins it strengthened to EF3 intensity; on Southeast 4th Street the tornado destroyed a home at EF3 intensity, with three fatalities being reported at the location. Two bodies were found in a pasture approximately 150 yards (140 m) from the home and the third was found later that night. A ranch-style home directly across the street had been undamaged by the tornado. It maintained EF3 intensity as it crossed U.S. Route 64, turning slightly eastward as it crossed over the roadway. Along the highway, several single-story wooden houses were destroyed by the tornado; debarking of trees in the area was also observed. Tornado sirens were sounded in Atkins at 4:34 pm, around 15 minutes before the tornado moved through the area. A tornado weeks prior near Appleton resulted in warnings being triggered earlier than usual.

On Interstate 40, the tornado threw two people 300 yards off the highway; both were seriously injured. Tractor-trailers on the interstate were flipped. To the northeast, the tornado heavily damaged the Union Grove Freewill Baptist Church; it had crossed onto Union Grove Road at EF3 intensity. In the northern portions of the Happy Bend community southeast of Hattieville, the tornado killed one person who had taken shelter from the tornado in a shipping container; the container was lofted and rolled 300 yards (270 m) from its original position. In this area, seven Entergy-managed electrical transmission lines were downed by the tornado. By February 24, the line was put back in service. Atkins suffered extensive damage; five people had been killed in the area. The tornado was described by a witness in Atkins as "dark clouds and a white funnel".

=== Conway County and impact in Cleveland ===
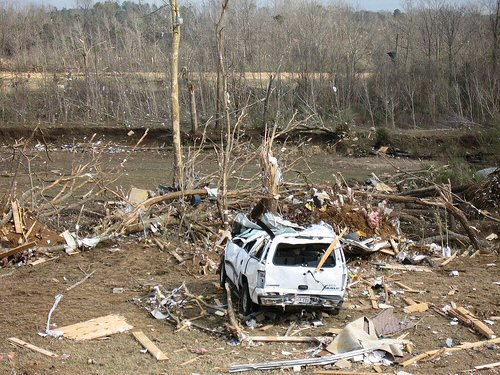
A dentist office in Clinton destroyed by the tornado

The tornado entered Conway County west of Hattieville at around 5:00 pm. On Arkansas Highway 24 the tornado destroyed a chicken coop, heavily damaging trees with debris. At 5:23 pm a tornado warning noting that "National Weather Service doppler radar indicator ... and spotters have confirmed a tornado 18 miles southwest of Clinton" was issued for Van Buren County ahead of the approaching tornado. On Lost Corner Road the tornado was recorded as having maintained EF2 intensity, with a maximum width of 0.6 miles (0.97 km). EF3 intensity was reached on Sheepskin Road, before the tornado again weakened.

Along the tornado's track through Conway County, two people were killed.

=== Van Buren County and Clinton ===
The tornado entered Van Buren County west of Arkansas Highway 330, moving to the northeast before pivoting east. On Claude Road the tornado was determined to have been at EF2 intensity, with a width of approximately 0.5 miles. East of Pleasant Grove, on Moores Lake Road, the tornado maintained EF2 intensity. After crossing Scotland Formosa Road at EF2 intensity it strengthened, inflicting EF3 damage to a home along Highway 336. Numerous homes in the area were damaged or destroyed, with one fatality being recorded. The tornado curved to the north before turning back east, at this point aiming for the southern portions of Clinton.

A boat factory with 18 active workers inside in Clinton sustained heavy damage, with one person dying at the location when it collapsed. One boat located on the property was lofted for 15 miles, landing in Fairfield Bay; another was found embedded in a home. A vehicle that had been parked at the factory was lofted and tossed 300 yards by the tornado. The site was still being cleared of debris as of February 25. A short distance away, a polling location building suffered roofing damage, causing injuries. The Van Buren Health Unit, located in Clinton, was closed due to damage from the tornado. On Pee Dee Road a home was destroyed, with the building's foundation being wiped clean of debris. A Dodge Dakota truck on the property was displaced by the tornado and was never located; trees in the area were snapped. Damage in this area was rated EF4, with the tornado being approximately 0.5 miles (0.80 km) in width. To the northeast several homes sustained roofing damage, with trees falling on Arkansas Highway 9. Closer to the roadway trees were debarked and their trunks snapped at EF3 intensity. The historic Hinkle Cabin, located on the Van Buren–Stone County line, suffered roof damage as the tornado moved through the area.

In Van Buren County, three people were killed. Three months later, in May 2008, a deadly EF3 tornado killed five people along a similar track through Conway and Van Buren counties.

=== Trek through Stone County and Mountain View ===
The tornado heavily damaged the Mountain View Chevrolet Inc. building and deroofed the Stone County Medical Center located across the street. A brick was thrown into an electricity generator at the hospital, disabling power to the building. Structural damage prevented the complex from being used effectively as a care center; despite damage to the building nobody inside sustained injuries. A car dealership in the town was also destroyed. Along Highway 14 a home was thrown into trees, killing an occupant. The tornado was estimated to have been at EF4 intensity as it moved through Mountain View, with a maximum estimated width of 0.5 miles (0.80 km).

Throughout the entire county, a total of 2,998 people were left without power. In the Highland area, twenty-two homes were destroyed.

=== Izard County, Sharp County and dissipation ===
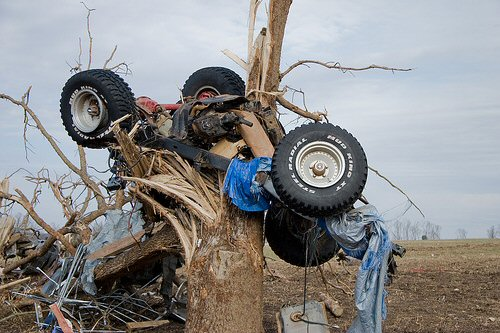
Vehicle wrapped around a tree in Zion

Entering Izard County the tornado moved parallel to Hars Creek Road and crossed both Arkansas Highway 167 and Arkansas Highway 354. The tornado entered the community of Highland from the southwest, hitting at approximately 6:53 pm. On Crystal Street several well-built homes suffered roofing damage, with one sustaining low-end EF2 damage. At least 40 businesses along Highway 62 in Highland suffered damage.

In Highland, numerous businesses, including the Highland Baptist Church, Highland Fire Station, Midway Plaza, 1st Landmark Missionary Church, and the Wing Shack Cheeseburger Grill, were destroyed. Damage was observed on Arkansas Highways 62 and 412 as it moved through the area; both roadways remained closed the day after the tornado. It inflicted extensive damage to the Highland School, and power to the town ceased shortly after it impacted the community. Insulation and other pieces of debris were found in a field near Easy Street to the northeast of Highland. The last observable structural damage was near Mary Street, where a tree fell onto a house. Trees were blown down before the tornado lifted 3.2 miles (5.1 km) northeast of Highland. Several pieces of debris, including corrugated metal and insulation, fell on River Road to the northeast of the tornado's path.

The tornado was on the ground for around 122 miles (196 km), making it the longest-tracked in Arkansas history since records began in 1950. In Sharp County a total of 71 homes and 56 businesses sustained some form of tornadic damage. Damage in the county was surveyed via aerial photography by Arkansas Wing Civil Air Patrol and National Weather Service damage surveyors.

== Aftermath ==
The tornado took place on Super Tuesday, the largest single day for elections in United States history. Polling locations in northern Conway County were reportedly closed.

=== Damage ===
Following the event, damage assessments were carried out by survey teams from the National Weather Service office in Little Rock. These surveys initially concluded that the tornado produced EF3 damage, although on February 8 the tornado was upgraded to EF4. It was the last violent tornado in Arkansas until an EF4 tornado tracked through the western parts of the state in May 2011. The tornado inflicted $11.5 million in damage in Pope and Izard counties, $14.5 million in damage was inflicted in Conway County, $22.75 million in damage was inflicted in Van Buren County, $29 million in damage was inflicted in Stone County, and $30 million in damage was inflicted in Sharp County.

=== Casualties ===
Damage to a boat factory in Clinton, where one person was killed

The tornado killed thirteen people, including five in the Atkins area and three in Clinton. The tornado was the deadliest in Arkansas since March 1997.

The Conway Regional Medical Center admitted 15 or 16 patients with tornadic injuries. At the time of the tornado 17 patients who had already been in the Stone County Regional Medical Center were transferred to a nearby nursing home.

Name	Age	Location	County	City/area	Refs.
Leon Fletcher	56	Mobile home	Pope	Atkins	
Jimmy Cherry	40	Frame home	Pope	Atkins	
Dana Cherry	43	Frame home	Pope	Atkins	
Emelaine Cherry	11	Frame home	Pope	Atkins	
Unnamed male	78	Mobile home	Pope	Atkins	
Archie York	84	Mobile home	Conway	Hattieville	
Katherine York	68	Mobile home	Conway	Hattieville	
Thomas Armstrong	29	Boat factory	Van Buren	Clinton	
Unnamed female	81	Frame home	Van Buren	Clinton	
Tonya Selken	36–37	Mobile home	Van Buren	Clinton	
Cathy Stogsdill	50	Frame home	Stone	Arkansas Highway 14	
Michael Willis	51	Mobile home	Izard	Melbourne	
Jason Burkhart	32	Mobile home	Izard	Zion	

=== Recovery efforts ===
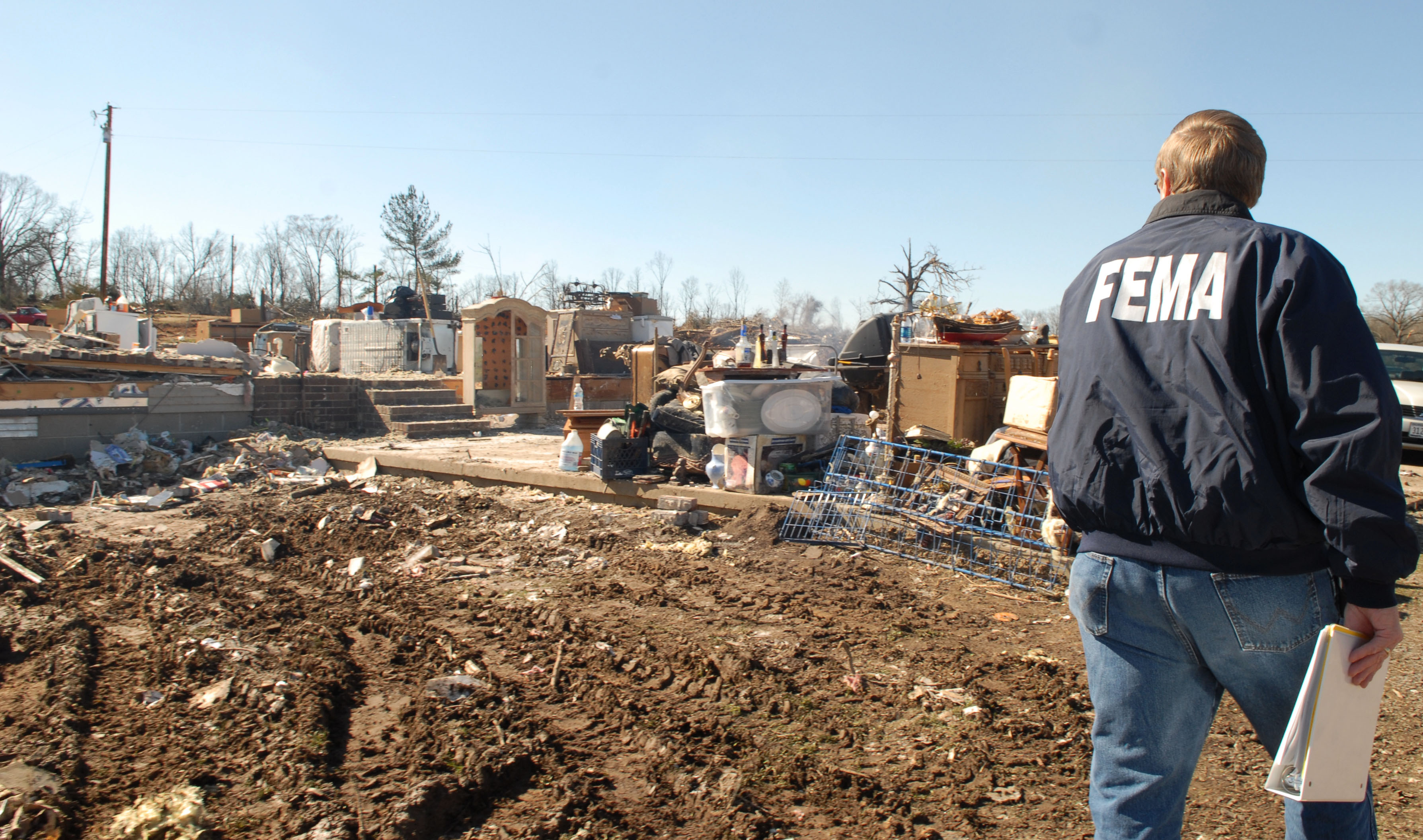
A FEMA community relations worker in Atkins on February 9

On February 6, then-President George W. Bush declared that a major disaster existed in the state of Arkansas. United States representative John Boozman toured Atkins following the tornado, noting that he wanted FEMA trailers to be accessible to storm victims. Local and state officials closely monitored the Federal Emergency Management Agency (FEMA) response to the tornado; concerns revolved around FEMA declining to take action during an EF3 tornado in Dumas the year prior. In response to the tornado, fifteen members of the 189th Security Forces Squadron in the Arkansas Air National Guard in Little Rock were deployed to Clinton to enlarge the presence of law enforcement officers. The 142nd Fire Brigade unit located in Fort Smith assisted with search-and-rescue efforts in Atkins.

Overall, 50 soldiers from the Arkansas Army and Air National Guard were in Clinton and Van Buren County. The police chief for Clinton requested for more assistance since he only had nine police officers for the city.

The Assumption Church along Main Street in Atkins became a place that served the needs of the community after the tornado. On Ash Wednesday, the pastor of the church opened up the McKee Hall to serve lunch and dinner meals for policemen, firefighters, and other relief workers. A few days later, on February 9, the yearly Valentine roast beef dinner served hot meals to the 200 people in attendance as the event raised $2,000 for victims of the tornado. On March 21, the Atkins Tornado Benefit Show was held, with the goal of raising money for victims of the tornado in Atkins.

The Stone County Medical Center, which was largely destroyed when the tornado moved through Mountain View, was fully rebuilt in 2011. Prior to the rebuilding, staff treated patients at temporary care facilities.

== See also ==
- Tornadoes of 2008
- List of F4, EF4, and IF4 tornadoes
  - List of F4 and EF4 tornadoes (2000–2009)
- List of North American tornadoes and tornado outbreaks
- 2014 Mayflower–Vilonia tornado – A destructive EF4 tornado that impacted areas in central Arkansas over 6 years later
- 2025 Fifty-Six–Larkin tornado – Another violent, long-track EF4 tornado that impacted some of the same areas in northern Arkansas, especially Stone, Izard and Sharp counties

== Notes and references ==
=== Sources ===
- Barjenbruch, Kevin; Decker, Dennis; Demuth, Julie; Gerard, Alan; Neitfield, Dan; Orrock, Jeff; Runnels, Steven; Schmidt, Jim; Trumbla, Ron; Vescio, Michael; Vesper, Pat (March 2009). "Service Assessment: Super Tuesday Tornado Outbreak of February 5-6, 2008". National Weather Service – via NOAA Institutional Repository.
- Buonanno, Christopher C.; Lewis III, John A. "Analysis of data from the 2008 Super Tuesday severe weather outbreak: An Arkansas perspective". American Meteorological Society.
- PBS&J (March 2008). "Pleasant Hills to ANO Emergency Rebuild - Pope County, Arkansas" (PDF). Storm Water Pollution Prevention Plan.
