= 2008 Super Tuesday tornado outbreak =

Deadly tornado outbreak in the southern United States

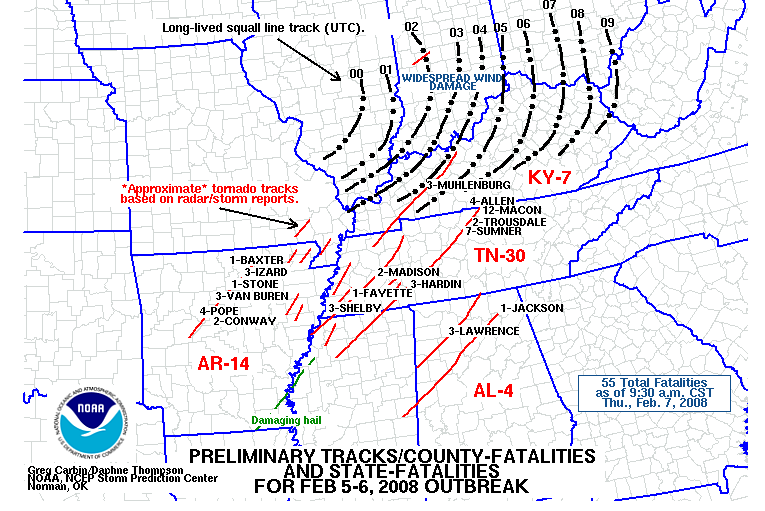
- Map of reported tornadoes (tornadoes in red)

Meteorological history
- Duration: February 5–6, 2008

Tornado outbreak
- Tornadoes: 87 (Record for a tornado outbreak in February)
- Max. rating: EF4 tornado
- Duration: 15 hours, 20 minutes
- Highest winds: Tornadic – 180 mph (290 km/h) (Pisgah-Flat Rock EF4 on February 6th)
- Highest gusts: Non-tornadic– 82 mph (132 km/h) in Terre Haute, Indiana
- Largest hail: 4.25 inches (10.8 cm)

Category 2 "Minor" winter storm
- Regional snowfall index: 4.55 (NOAA)
- Max. snowfall: 21 in (53 cm) in southwestern Wisconsin

Overall effects
- Fatalities: 57 fatalities (+4 non-tornadic),
- Injuries: 425 injuries
- Damage: $1.2 billion (2008 USD)
- Areas affected: Southern United States, Lower Ohio River Valley
- Part of the tornado outbreaks of 2008 and the 2007–08 North American winter

A deadly tornado outbreak affected the Southern United States and the lower Ohio Valley on February 5 and 6, 2008. The outbreak began on Super Tuesday, while 24 states in the United States were holding primary elections and caucuses to select the presidential candidates for the upcoming presidential election. Missouri, Illinois, Arkansas, Alabama, and Tennessee were among the affected regions in which primaries were being held. Some voting locations were forced to close early due to the approaching severe weather.

The outbreak generated 86 tornadoes between 21:00 UTC 5 February and 13:00 UTC 6 February. The storm system produced several destructive tornadoes in heavily populated areas, most notably in the Memphis metropolitan area, in Jackson, Tennessee, and the northeastern end of the Nashville metropolitan area.

A total of 57 people were killed across four states and 18 counties, with hundreds of others injured. The outbreak, at the time, was the deadliest in the era of modern NEXRAD doppler radar, which was fully implemented in 1997. The event was the second deadliest in February since 1950 behind the 1971 Mississippi Delta tornado outbreak, which killed 123, the deadliest outbreak in both Tennessee and Kentucky since the 1974 Super Outbreak, and was at the time the deadliest tornado outbreak in the US overall since the 1985 United States–Canada tornado outbreak which killed 76 people. This record would not be surpassed until the 2011 Super Outbreak which killed 324 people. Damage from tornadoes was estimated at over $500 million (2008 USD).

The weather system which produced the tornadoes caused significant straight-line wind damage, hail as large as softballs – 4.5 inches (11 cm) in diameter – major flooding, significant freezing rain, and heavy snow across many areas of eastern North America. The total damage from the entire weather system reached $1.2 billion.

== Meteorological synopsis ==
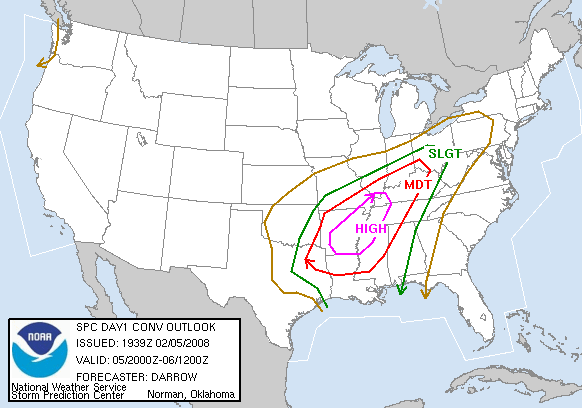
The SPC's convective outlook on February 5, 2008, at 1939 UTC (1:39 pm CST)

A series of strong low pressure systems formed across the southern Great Plains on February 4, contributing to record warmth on February 4 and 5 in the southern Plains and lower Mississippi River Valley. High temperatures across many areas reached the 70s°F (21–26 °C), and in Alabama temperatures reached the low 80s°F (27 °C) with dew points in the middle 60s° (17–20 °C). Dewpoints in the mid 60s°F were recorded as far north as Memphis. A strong cold front trailing the low-pressure area approached the region from the west.

As the surface low progressed northeast, a strong jet streak was positioned over the warm sector, with winds moving East which was perpendicular to the direction of the surface winds, which were out at the southeast. This sharp change in winds resulted in much wind shear and wind profiles favoring rotating supercells capable of producing significant tornadoes. The strong jet stream also provided tons of lift, favoring supercells to form in the open warm sector with instability across the outbreak area. CAPE values, a measurement of the level of tropospheric instability, was well over 1000 J/kg, and Storm Relative Helicity, a measurement of the potential for rotating winds, reached over 200 m^{2}/s².

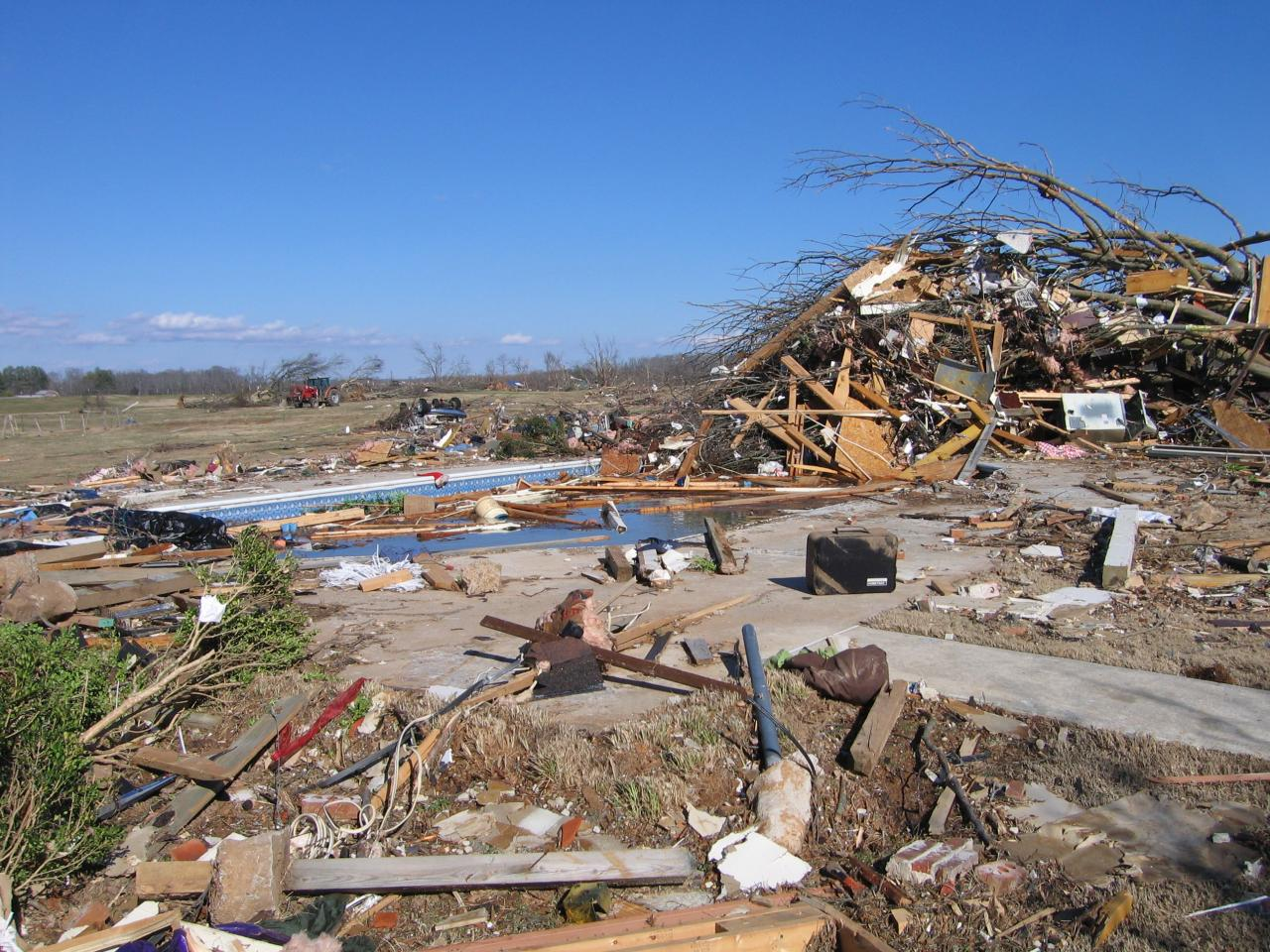
EF4 damage to a large brick-veneered wooden frame home near Moulton, Alabama.

On February 5 at 6:39 am CST (1239 UTC), the Storm Prediction Center (SPC) issued a high risk of severe storms for most of Arkansas, the first in February since 1998. At 10:16 am CST (1616 UTC), the high risk area was extended farther northeast to include western Kentucky, northwestern Mississippi, the Missouri Bootheel, West Tennessee, and Southern Illinois. A moderate risk of severe weather was issued for northwestern Alabama, the rest of Arkansas, the rest of southern Illinois, southern Indiana, most of the rest of Kentucky, northern Louisiana, central Mississippi, parts of southeastern Missouri, southwestern Ohio, eastern Oklahoma, middle Tennessee and northeastern Texas. A total of fifteen watches were issued by the SPC during the outbreak, including thirteen tornado watches (two of which were PDS watches) and two severe thunderstorm watches.

Early on the morning of February 5, a squall line developed across eastern Texas northward into Missouri and moved east towards the high risk area. Ahead of the squall line, the cap took longer than expected to break, but when it finally did in the late afternoon hours, numerous supercell thunderstorms quickly formed across Arkansas and southern Missouri. The first tornadoes touched down around 3:30 pm CST (2130 UTC). A cap is a layer of relatively warm air aloft (usually several thousand feet above the ground) which suppresses or delays the development of thunderstorms; the cap often prevents or delays thunderstorm development even in the presence of extreme instability. However, if the cap is removed or weakened, then explosive thunderstorm development can occur. Some of the most powerful tornado-producing supercells were situated across the Memphis and Jackson areas, as well as central Arkansas (one producing a tornado that tracked 122 miles (196 km) and lasted about two hours) between 5:00 and 7:30 pm CST (2300 to 0130 UTC) while numerous other tornadoes were reported across northern Mississippi northwest of Tupelo, Mississippi, early in the evening. As the evening progressed, one of these supercells traveled across Middle Tennessee including the Nashville metropolitan area and south-central Kentucky, where several deadly tornadoes were reported during the evening hours between 7:30 pm and 11:00 pm CST (0130 to 0500 UTC) Meanwhile, the squall line that developed from near Dallas to Kansas City moved eastward throughout the late evening and overnight hours causing numerous reports of damaging wind along with many spin-up tornadoes from Louisiana to Ohio and Indiana. It then moved through the southeast U.S. during the early morning hours. Additional strong thunderstorms developed ahead of the front across the southeast during the overnight and early morning hours. A record (at the time) of five tornado emergency declarations were issued on February 5; four for Tennessee, and one in Alabama.

On February 6, a slight risk of severe weather was issued for much of the eastern United States from Pennsylvania to the Florida Panhandle as the squall line raced eastward ahead of the cold front. After several additional tornadoes touched down in Alabama during the early morning hours just before dawn, the primary severe weather threat became damaging wind across the Mid-Atlantic States. No additional tornadoes were reported during the late morning and afternoon as the cold front exited into the Atlantic Ocean, although wind damage was reported across eastern Kentucky, eastern Pennsylvania and most of Georgia. Farther north, snow and freezing rain, at times heavy, continued from Iowa to Quebec until February 7 as the center of the system moved slowly out of the area.

== Confirmed tornadoes ==
Confirmed tornadoes by Enhanced Fujita rating
EFU	EF0	EF1	EF2	EF3	EF4	EF5	Total
0	31	30	16	5	5	0	87

=== Atkins–Clinton–Mountain View–Highland, Arkansas ===
Atkins–Clinton–Mountain View–Highland, Arkansas
- The tornado as it was in rural Izard County

Meteorological history
- Formed: February 5, 2008, 4:49 p.m. CST (UTC−06:00)
- Dissipated: February 5, 2008, 6:56 p.m. CST (UTC−06:00)
- Duration: 2 hours, 7 minutes

EF4 tornado
- on the Enhanced Fujita scale
- Highest winds: 166–200 mph (267–322 km/h)

Overall effects
- Casualties: 13 fatalities, 139 injuries
- Economic losses: $119.31 million (2008 USD)

The first long-lived supercell, which spawned the tornado with the longest continuous track of any single tornado to occur during this outbreak, developed around 4:50 p.m. CST (2250 UTC) southeast of Centerville in Yell County, Arkansas. The tornado touched down to the southwest of New Neely, causing minor damage to two structures and downing trees at EF0 to EF1 strength. The tornado tracked into Pope County, rapidly intensifying to EF3 strength as it slammed into Lucky Landing, a marina at Lake Atkins, where one woman was killed. Continuing northeast, the tornado struck the southern and eastern outskirts of Atkins, killing three people. Northeast of Atkins, the tornado toppled metal truss towers, destroyed chicken houses, and heavily damaged a large church and gym. In the Happy Bend area, another fatality occurred as a man abandoned his mobile home and sought shelter in a large metal shipping container, which was tossed hundreds of yards into a wooded area.

The tornado intensified to EF4 strength as it entered Van Buren County and tore through the south edge of Clinton, killing three people in the vicinity. The tornado maintained EF4 intensity as it continued into Stone County, slamming into the town of Mountain View. In the Mountain View area, 38 homes and mobile homes were destroyed, 15 sustained major damage, and 15 sustained minor damage. The tornado weakened slightly to high-end EF3 strength as it crossed into Izard County and impacted the rural community of Zion, killing two people. Hundreds of cattle were killed in this area; an unanchored home was swept clean from its foundation. Maintaining EF3 intensity, the tornado then struck the town of Highland in Sharp County, resulting in severe damage. To the northeast of Highland, the tornado rapidly weakened and dissipated.

=== Southaven, Mississippi/Memphis, Tennessee ===
Southaven, Mississippi/Memphis, Tennessee
- The tornado tracking through Memphis shortly before becoming rain-wrapped

Meteorological history
- Formed: February 5, 2008, 5:32 p.m. CST (UTC−06:00)
- Dissipated: February 5, 2008, 5:45 p.m. CST (UTC−06:00)
- Duration: 13 minutes

EF2 tornado
- on the Enhanced Fujita scale
- Highest winds: 125 mph (201 km/h)

Overall effects
- Casualties: 3 fatalities, 13 injuries

At 5:32 p.m. CST (2332 UTC), a supercell thunderstorm produced a multiple-vortex tornado in Southaven, Mississippi. The tornado first struck Southaven High School, where 30 windows were broken, minor roof damage occurred, and damage was rated EF0. In the nearby Carriage Hill subdivision, several homes sustained minor damage as well. The tornado rapidly intensified to EF2 strength as it crossed the intersection of Stateline Road and Airways Boulevard, destroying three warehouse buildings. One of the buildings destroyed was the Cooper Lighting Plant, and a gas station in this area was damaged as well. Numerous trees and power poles were also downed in Southaven.

The tornado maintained EF2 intensity as it quickly tracked across the Mississippi – Tennessee state line and into southeastern portions of Memphis, where WREG tower cameras broadcast live footage of the tornado moving through the southeastern parts of Memphis, producing multiple bright blue power flashes along the way. By this point, the National Weather Service issued a Tornado Emergency (the first of five to be issued during the outbreak) for most of the Memphis metropolitan area. The tornado produced an extensive swath of damage as it moved through residential and commercial areas. Considerable damage was reported at Memphis International Airport, where a hangar lost its roof, the FedEx freight terminal's fire station suffered roof damage, airstair trucks were thrown 100 yards (91 m), and aircraft were moved around, including a Boeing 737 that was moved one foot. FedEx service was disrupted due to flight delays and closed roads, all because of the tornado damage in surrounding areas. The airport weather station's reporting equipment recorded a wind gust of 73 knots (84 mph; 135 km/h). In the Clarke Road area, tractor trailers were tossed around, a power substation was severely damaged, and several warehouse structures sustained heavy damage. This included a DSC warehouse that was destroyed, killing three people inside. Numerous windows were shattered at the Willow Lake Business Park, and utility poles and trees were snapped in the area. Multiple homes along Maple Tree Drive and Pinbranch Court were damaged, five of which sustained major damage. The Hardy Bottling Company facility was also damaged, which released 120,000 pounds (54,000 kg) of anhydrous ammonia into the atmosphere, although no public health impacts were reported. Continuing northeast, the tornado weakened to EF1 strength and struck the Hickory Ridge Mall, resulting in total collapse of a large wall and much of the roof at the Sears department store. Damage surveyors noted very poor construction at this location, and six people in the mall were injured. Cars and semi-trailers near the mall were flipped and damaged as well. A Taco Bell and a few other businesses were damaged along Winchester Road before the tornado dissipated. Numerous trees and power poles were snapped along much of the tornado's path through Southaven and Memphis, and electricity supply to about 65,000 customers was briefly cut.

The National Weather Service office in Memphis rated the tornado as an EF2. Three people were killed and 13 others were injured. Shelby County Election Commission administrator James Johnson stated the weather did not interfere with Super Tuesday primary voting.

=== Jackson, Tennessee tornado family ===
Jackson, Tennessee tornado family
- The EF4 tornado illuminated by lightning as seen within Jackson, Tennessee

Meteorological history
- Formed: February 5, 2008, 6:21 p.m. CST (UTC−06:00)
- Dissipated: February 5, 2008, 7:07 p.m. CST (UTC−06:00)
- Duration: 46 minutes

Tornado family
- Tornadoes: 2
- Max. rating: EF4 tornado
- Highest winds: 170 mph (270 km/h) (Jackson, Tennessee tornado)

Overall effects
- Casualties: 3 fatalities, 65 injuries
- Economic losses: Unknown

Confirmed tornadoes by Enhanced Fujita rating
EFU	EF0	EF1	EF2	EF3	EF4	EF5	Total
0	0	0	0	1	1	0	2

At 6:21 pm CST northeast of Memphis in Fayette County, another powerful tornado touched down near the rural community of Yum Yum and quickly reached EF3 intensity. This tornado was spawned by the same supercell that had affected Memphis about an hour earlier. Near the beginning of the path, a shed was obliterated and a pickup truck parked inside was thrown 40 feet (12 m) and mangled, killing a man inside the vehicle. Several other vehicles were tossed, and significant damage to large trees was observed before the tornado crossed into Haywood County. Weakening to EF2 strength, the tornado struck the town of Dancyville, destroying a house, severely damaging another house and a church, and uprooting numerous large trees. The tornado then struck the rural community of Hillville, where two mobile homes were completely destroyed, a frame home was heavily damaged, and a convenience store sustained roof damage. Numerous large trees in this area were snapped, and an outbuilding was flattened. Several other homes along this segment of the path sustained minor damage. Regaining EF3 strength, the tornado crossed into Madison County, striking the Huntersville community. Numerous homes were damaged or destroyed in Huntersville, and two people were killed. A church in town sustained major damage, and a nearby church bus was tossed several hundred feet and flipped upside down. The tornado then exited Huntersville and headed towards the city of Jackson. Several cars and at least 13 tractor trailers were blown off of I-40 by the tornado in this area. One car was tossed 75 yards (69 m) into a farm field. A rest area along the interstate was severely damaged before the tornado began to weaken and lifted as it approached US 412, dissipating just before it would have entered densely populated areas of western and northern Jackson at 6:54 pm CST.

Shortly after the initial tornado dissipated, a new circulation rapidly developed to the east of the old one. This new circulation produced a tornado that touched down at the Union University campus in Jackson at 6:59 pm CST, almost immediately intensifying into a violent EF4 and causing tremendous damage. Several large, brick, two-story dormitory buildings sustained major structural damage, two of which completely collapsed. In total, 80% of the dormitory buildings on campus were damaged or destroyed, and hundreds of vehicles were damaged or destroyed in the parking lots around campus. Twelve students at the university were trapped in damaged buildings but all were eventually rescued. Due to the damage, the university was closed until February 18. Past Union University, the tornado weakened slightly and maintained EF3 strength along the remainder of the path. It tracked across US 45, heavily damaging several banks, businesses, a hospital, and several doctors offices. The tornado then moved through the northern part of Jackson, inflicting significant damage to many subdivisions and businesses. The Chapel Creek, Indian Hills, and Wyndhurst subdivisions were all struck by the tornado. Numerous homes were damaged in this area, some of which sustained loss of roofs and exterior walls. Additional damage was noted at Northside High School, at the Jackson Oaks Senior Living Complex, and in the Walnut Trace subdivision as well. Continuing northeast, the tornado caused major damage to multiple additional homes as it crossed near the intersection of Christmasville Road and Ashport Road. The Madison County Fire Station #11 was destroyed in this area as well, with the station's fire engine and pumper, along with its water and brush trucks all being damaged. Beyond this point, the tornado weakened and dissipated at 7:07 pm CST. Overall, 70 structures in Jackson were destroyed and more than 500 more damaged. Despite causing EF4 damage after dark in a densely populated area, the tornado did not cause any deaths in Jackson, though 51 people were injured, and the initial EF3 tornado caused three fatalities and 14 injuries. The second of the two tornadoes was the third violent tornado to hit Jackson in 10 years. Two others, both rated F4, had devastated the community on January 17, 1999 and May 4, 2003. Over 60 people in the city of Jackson were treated for injuries as a result of the severe weather, 50 of whom were released immediately. Estimates indicate that the tornadoes caused about $47 million worth of damages in Madison County, with $40 million of that total occurring at Union University alone.

=== Castalian Springs–Lafayette, Tennessee/Tompkinsville, Kentucky ===
Castalian Springs–Lafayette, Tennessee/Tompkinsville, Kentucky
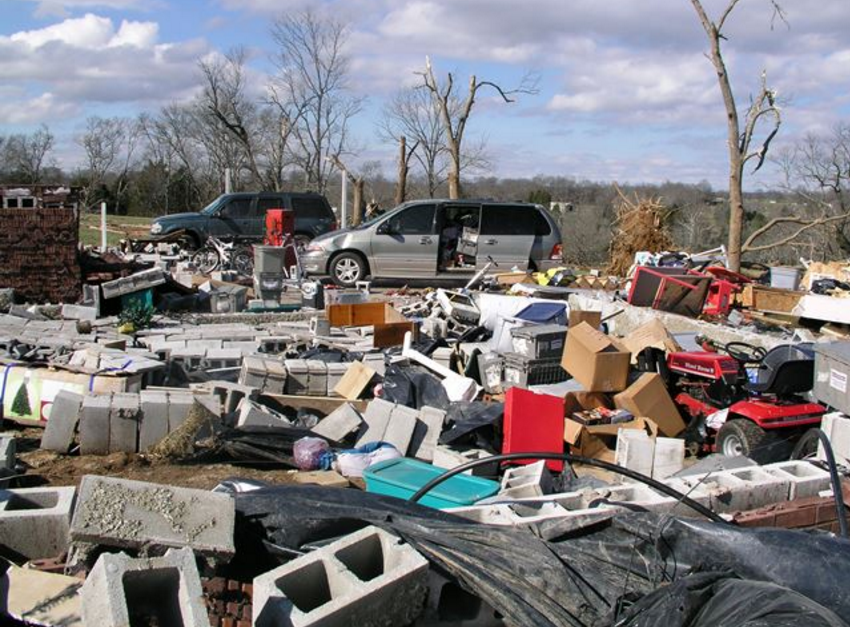
- EF3 damage to a block foundation home that was leveled in Castalian Springs, Tennessee.

Meteorological history
- Formed: February 5, 2008, 10:02 p.m. CST (UTC−06:00)
- Dissipated: February 5, 2008, 10:50 p.m. CST (UTC−06:00)
- Duration: 48 minutes

EF3 tornado
- on the Enhanced Fujita scale
- Highest winds: 160 mph (260 km/h)

Overall effects
- Casualties: 22 fatalities (+1 indirect), 63 injuries

Just after 9:00 p.m. CST (0300 UTC), a supercell that had spawned tornadoes over northern Mississippi as well as a deadly EF4 in Hardin County, Tennessee, moved to the northeast over Nashville. Funnel clouds were sighted during the storm's passage, though no tornadoes were reported and no significant damage was reported in Nashville or Davidson County. At the time the supercell moved over Nashville, a National Hockey League game between the Nashville Predators and the Carolina Hurricanes, which was nationally televised on Versus, was being played at the Sommet Center. With just over nine minutes left in the third period, Predators head coach Barry Trotz was told that the game may have to be stopped. Although the game continued to completion, at the game's end fans were not allowed to leave the arena until the storm had passed. National Weather Service Meteorologist Bobby Boyd theorized that cold air downbursts impinged on the development of a strong, low-level circulation as the storm moved through the Nashville area, forcing the area of rotation to remain aloft as it crossed over Davidson County and downtown Nashville.

Radar loop of the Nashville, Jackson and Christian County, Kentucky supercells. These supercells were responsible for 31 deaths alone.

After the supercell moved through Nashville and the environment became favorable again, a tornado touched down to the southwest of Castalian Springs in Sumner County, Tennessee, just after 10:00 p.m. CST (0400 UTC). This was the beginning of a devastating, long-track EF3 tornado that would go on to directly kill 22 people and become the deadliest of the outbreak (as well as the entire year). At the beginning of the path, damage was relatively minor and limited to snapped trees and damaged roofs. However, the tornado rapidly intensified to EF3 strength as it tore directly through Castalian Springs, destroying numerous homes and businesses. The town's post office was completely leveled, mobile homes were obliterated, and several block-foundation homes were leveled or swept away. The 19th century Wynnewood Inn, a national historical landmark and stagecoach stop, suffered major damage to its second floor and grounds during the storm. 11-month old Castalian Springs resident Kyson Stowell survived being thrown from his family's home and carried through the air by the tornado as the structure was completely destroyed. Kyson was found unharmed in an open field, nearly 500 feet away from where he originated. Kyson's mother, Kerri Stowell, was killed in the tornado. A total of 85 homes were destroyed along this portion of the tornado's path. Seven fatalities were confirmed in Castalian Springs, and 14 other people were injured.

The tornado then tracked into Trousdale County and passed through rural areas to the northwest of Hartsville, weakening slightly to high-end EF2 strength. Frame homes were damaged or destroyed, vehicles were tossed and damaged, numerous trees were snapped and denuded, and mobile homes were obliterated with debris and insulation strewn long distances downwind. Ten homes were destroyed, and 23 homes had major damage along this segment of the path. As a result of the tornado, a major fire occurred as a natural gas plant was ripped apart by the tornado in the southwestern portion of the county. The area was evacuated and no one was injured at the plant. Two people were killed at a home along US 231, and five other people were injured in the county. Crossing into Macon County, the tornado regained EF3 intensity as it struck the western and northern sections of Lafayette, resulting in widespread, major destruction in the area. Numerous homes and several churches were destroyed in Lafayette, with several leveled to the ground. An auto sales business in town sustained heavy damage as well. Surveyors observed major damage to a large, expensive brick home that was built unanchored on a very weak, unreinforced cinder block foundation. The house shifted off the foundation during the tornado, causing walls to buckle and collapse. 170 homes were destroyed, and 9 homes had major damage in the Lafayette area. Thirteen people were killed in and around town, and 44 others were injured. President George W. Bush toured the Macon County destruction on February 8 and promised relief to individuals. The logging industry in Macon County was hit hard, with about a million dollars' worth of trees destroyed. Debris from Lafayette was found as far north as Sano, Kentucky, in Adair County, approximately 70 miles (113 km) to the northeast. Sixteen thousand TVA electricity customers in Macon and Trousdale Counties lost power, some of whom did not have their service restored for a week. Macon County schools were closed until February 19. In total, roughly 260 houses in the three Tennessee counties were destroyed, and damage amounts were estimated at $78 million in Macon County alone.

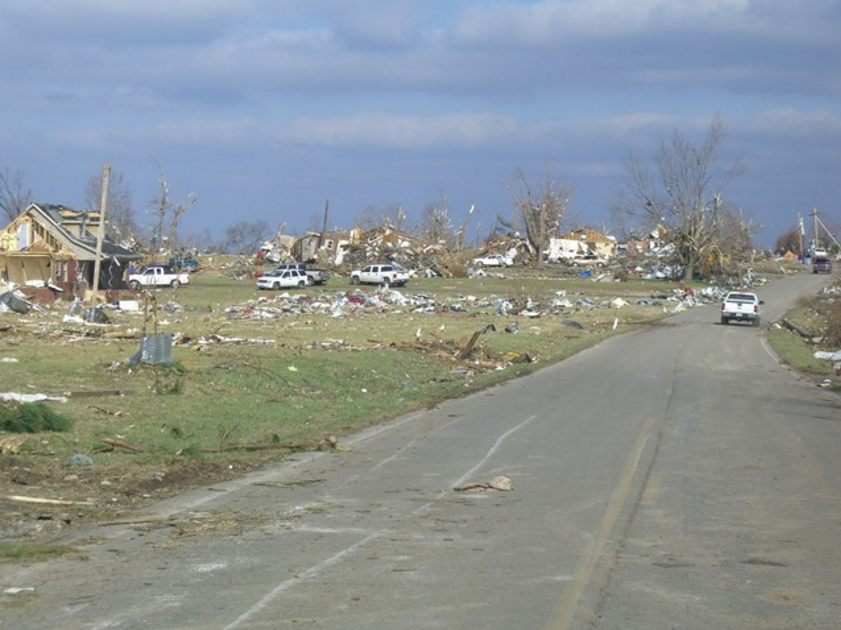
Widespread destruction from the tornado in Lafayette, Tennessee.

The tornado continued across the state boundary into Monroe County, Kentucky as an EF3, where two frame homes and two mobile homes near Gamaliel were destroyed, and several other structures suffered extensive damage. Thirteen people from an adjacent trailer park took shelter in the basement of one of the frame homes that was destroyed, and were trapped by debris for up to 30 minutes before being rescued. Past Gamaliel, the tornado struck a subdivision and damaged several homes at that location before moving through rural areas towards Tompkinsville, snapping and uprooting numerous large trees along the way. The tornado maintained EF3 strength as it clipped the north edge of Tompkinsville, where a large wood frame warehouse was destroyed, a metal frame industrial building was twisted off of its foundation, and a large, well-built brick home was left with only interior walls remaining. A three car detached garage was completely destroyed as well. Continuing northeast past Tompkinsville, the tornado began to weaken, and eventually lifted as it crossed into Cumberland County. The tornado caused no injuries or fatalities in Kentucky.

Extensive damage surveys by the National Weather Service office in Nashville confirmed that all 22 deaths along the path (which was revised downward from 24 due to double-counting) were caused by a single long-track EF3 tornado. The tornado path was 50.32 miles (80.98 km) long and up to 880 yards (800 m) wide at times. The devastation was described by Governor Phil Bredesen as this: "It looks like the Lord took a Brillo pad and scrubbed the ground," while he was surveying by helicopter. This tornado was the deadliest single tornado to strike Middle Tennessee in over 75 years and the deadliest tornado in the United States since the Evansville tornado of November 2005, which killed 24 people; both tornadoes occurred during nighttime hours.

=== Moulton–Decatur, Alabama ===
Moulton–Decatur, Alabama
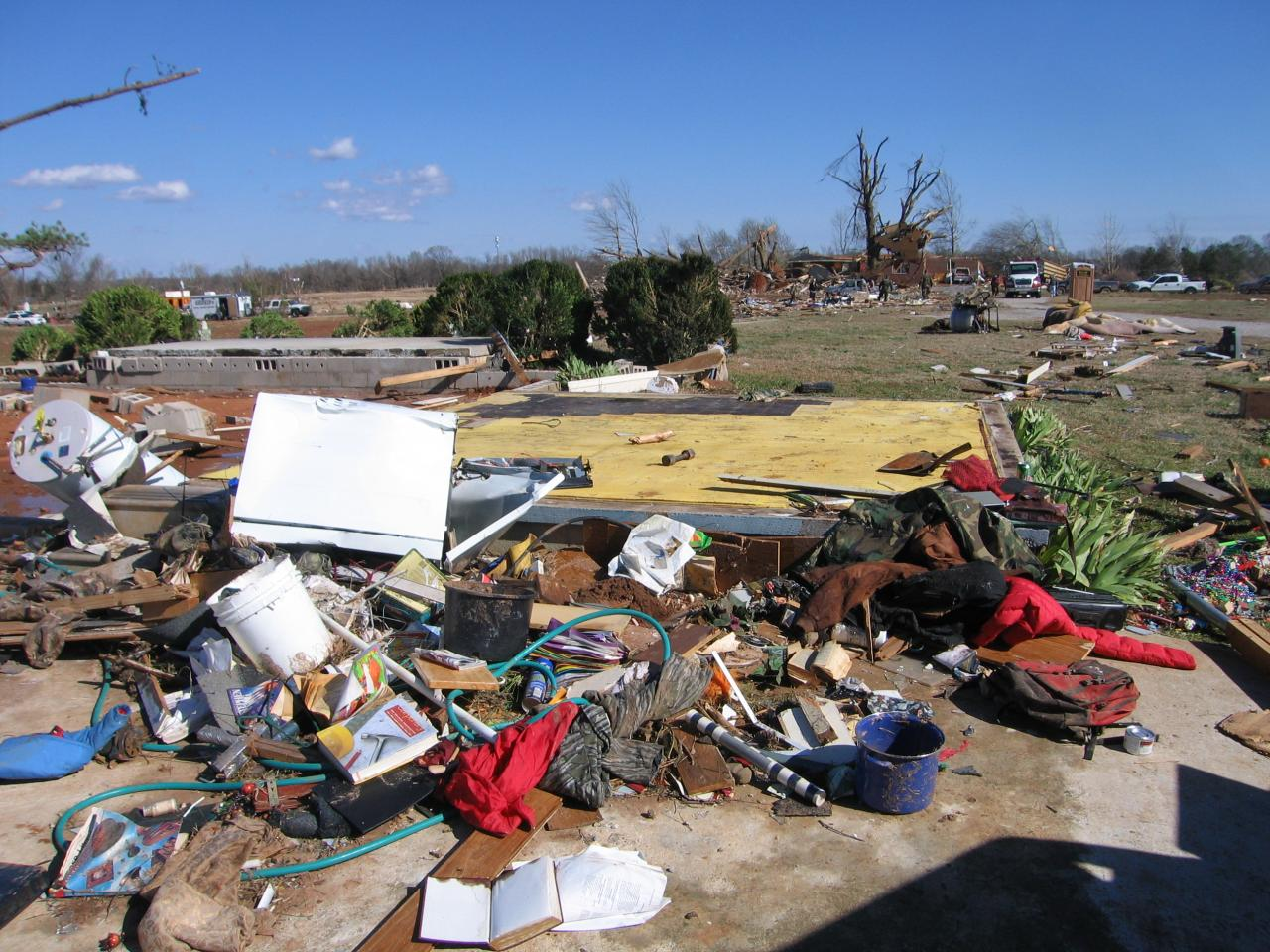
- Low-end EF4 damage to a home near Moulton, Alabama.

Meteorological history
- Formed: February 6, 2008, 03:02 a.m. CST (UTC−06:00)
- Dissipated: February 6, 2008, 03:24 a.m. CST (UTC−06:00)
- Duration: 22 minutes

EF4 tornado
- on the Enhanced Fujita scale
- Highest winds: 170 mph (270 km/h)

Overall effects
- Casualties: 4 fatalities, 23 injuries

At approximately 1:00 a.m. CST (0700 UTC), the broken squall line that had affected Oklahoma and Missouri entered the state of Alabama. Individual supercell storms began to develop ahead of the squall line along the Alabama–Mississippi border due to the strengthening of the upper-level jet stream. A supercell that developed over Starkville, Mississippi, and tracked over Lamar, Marion and Fayette Counties in Alabama spawned a tornado in Lawrence County, Alabama, at 3:02 a.m. CST (0902 UTC). The tornado touched down south of Moulton near the William B. Bankhead National Forest. Many houses were damaged or destroyed, and a church was leveled. Three fatalities, all from a single family, were reported north of Aldridge Grove. A large, brick, two story home was completely leveled to the ground at one location, and a truck was thrown more than 100 yards into a field. Fence posts anchored in concrete were ripped out of the ground and thrown up to 100 feet away in different directions. Numerous large trees were snapped, uprooted, and denuded along the path as well. In addition to the other three fatalities, an elderly woman was also killed in the destruction of her mobile home, and 23 others were injured. The tornado was initially classified as an EF3, although it was upgraded to EF4 in later analysis. The hardest hit communities were the rural communities of Wren, Speake, Pin Hook and Five Points. The tornado moved into Morgan County and threatened the Decatur area, leading the NWS in Huntsville to issue a tornado emergency (the fifth for the outbreak) for Morgan County and southern Limestone County. The tornado lifted off the ground before reaching Decatur. The same supercell moved over the Huntsville Metro area, though no tornadoes were reported.

== Non-tornadic events ==
Numerous reports of damaging winds were associated with the passage of the cold front. Wind gusts from Arkansas to Indiana exceeded 50 mph (80 km/h), bringing down numerous trees and power lines, and causing widespread power outages. A 67 mph (108 km/h) wind gust was recorded during the passage of a squall line at Little Rock National Airport. The highest recorded wind gust associated with the passage of the squall line was 82 mph (132 km/h) in Terre Haute, Indiana. Hail as large as softballs (4.5 inches (11 cm) in diameter) was reported in several communities. In Canada, unseasonably early thunderstorms brought bouts of heavy rainfall to parts of southern Ontario late on February 4.

=== Flooding ===
Heavy rains in association with thunderstorms on February 4 to February 6, combined with the melting of snow, caused flooding across parts of Illinois, New York, Kentucky, Indiana and Ohio. Among the areas hardest hit by the flooding rivers and streams were the Miami Valley, areas along the Blanchard River in Findlay and parts of northern Indiana between Indianapolis and north of Fort Wayne along the Tippecanoe, St. Marys and Wabash Rivers. Several streets in Fort Wayne were under water, and flooding also occurred between Lafayette and Terre Haute.

=== Winter storm ===
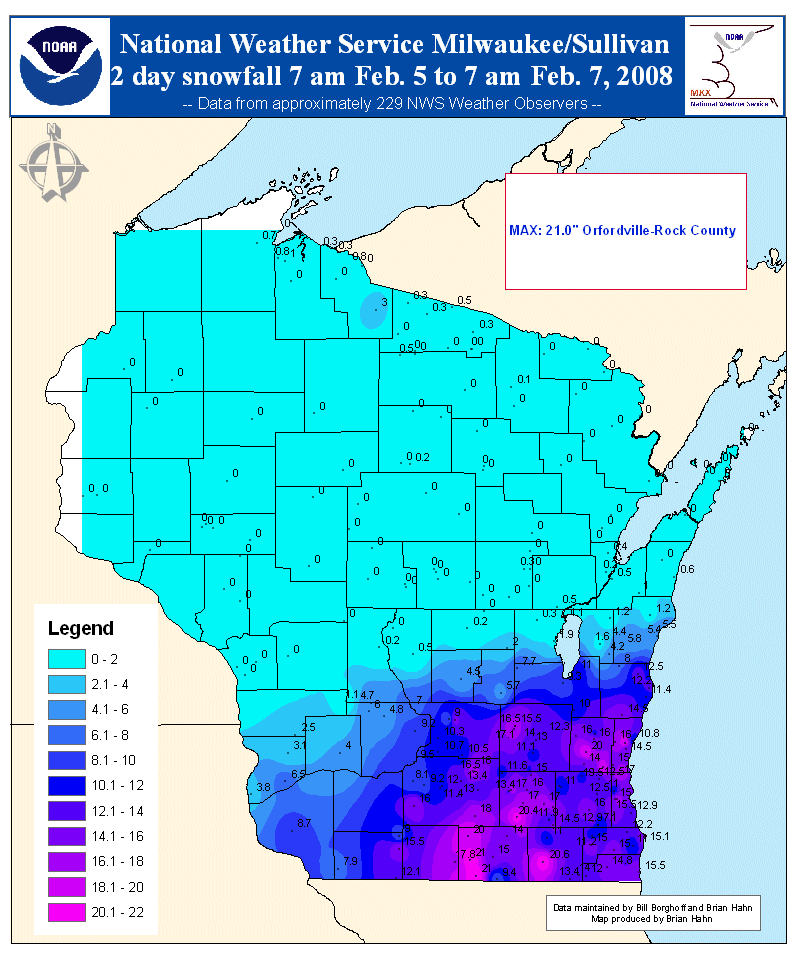
Wisconsin snowfall map amounts from February 5–6 event

The same low pressure systems that caused the tornado outbreak also spawned a significant snowstorm from the Central Plains to the western Great Lakes where winter storm warnings were issued. Between 10 and 15 inches (25 and 38 centimetres) of snow fell from eastern Iowa to southern Wisconsin and Northern Illinois, with local amounts ranging from 18 to 21 inches (46 to 53 centimetres) in southeastern Wisconsin. In Michigan, up to 14 inches (36 cm) of snow fell north of Grand Rapids. Environment Canada also issued freezing rain and winter storm warnings for Southern Ontario, where some areas north of Lake Erie received close to 1 inch (25 mm) of freezing rain. In Toronto, two waves of moderate to heavy snow accompanied by thunder and lightning, along with ice pellets, brought up to 14 inches (36 cm) of accumulated winter precipitation on February 6 and 7. Other areas from Windsor to Ottawa, as well as southwestern Nova Scotia, received from 4 to 20 inches (10 to 51 centimetres) of snow.

Over 1,000 flight cancellations were reported at Chicago's O'Hare International Airport, and numerous flight cancellations also occurred at Toronto's Pearson International Airport. In Milwaukee, whiteout conditions and 13 inches (33 cm) of snow briefly shut down the General Mitchell International Airport. Near Madison, Wisconsin, about 1,000 vehicles were stranded on Interstate 90 due to the snow. Wisconsin Governor Jim Doyle declared a state of emergency for the area and activated the Wisconsin National Guard. On February 6, numerous schools, colleges, government buildings, churches, businesses, and shopping malls were forced to close throughout southern Wisconsin and northern Illinois due to the inclement weather. The winter storm was responsible for at least four deaths: one each in Illinois, Wisconsin, Michigan and Quebec.

== Aftermath ==
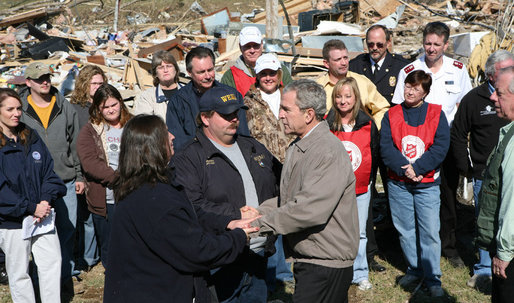
US President George W. Bush touring tornado-ravaged Middle Tennessee areas on February 8, 2008

On February 7 a federal disaster declaration was made by President George W. Bush for 11 counties in Arkansas and five counties in Tennessee. Sixteen additional counties in Tennessee requested federal aid, and on February 12, Tennessee Governor Bredesen announced that eight counties in Tennessee became eligible. President Bush also visited Tennessee to tour the devastated areas on February 8.

The American Red Cross, the Salvation Army, the United Way and other charitable groups also quickly mobilized volunteers to assist survivors in the aftermath across the regions affected. In the three hardest hit Middle Tennessee counties alone, the Red Cross sent out over 100 volunteers to deliver meals and supplies. Emergency assistance was also offered by the Tennessee Department of Human Services for low income victims in the counties affected by the tornadoes. In addition, the Nashville Predators announced that for their game on February 7 against the Tampa Bay Lightning, half the ticket sales revenue would be donated to the American Red Cross to help with their efforts, and that fans could make additional donations to Red Cross volunteers at the arena's main entrances. The National Football League's Tennessee Titans along with the Mayor's Office of Emergency Management of Nashville organized a donation drive during the weekend of February 9 at LP Field.

== See also ==
- List of North American tornadoes and tornado outbreaks
- Tornadoes of 2008
- Winter storms of 2007–08
- Tornado outbreak of March 2–3, 2020 – also occurred during Super Tuesday
