= 2025 Fifty-Six–Larkin tornado =

Long-track 2025 EF4 tornado across Arkansas and Missouri, USA

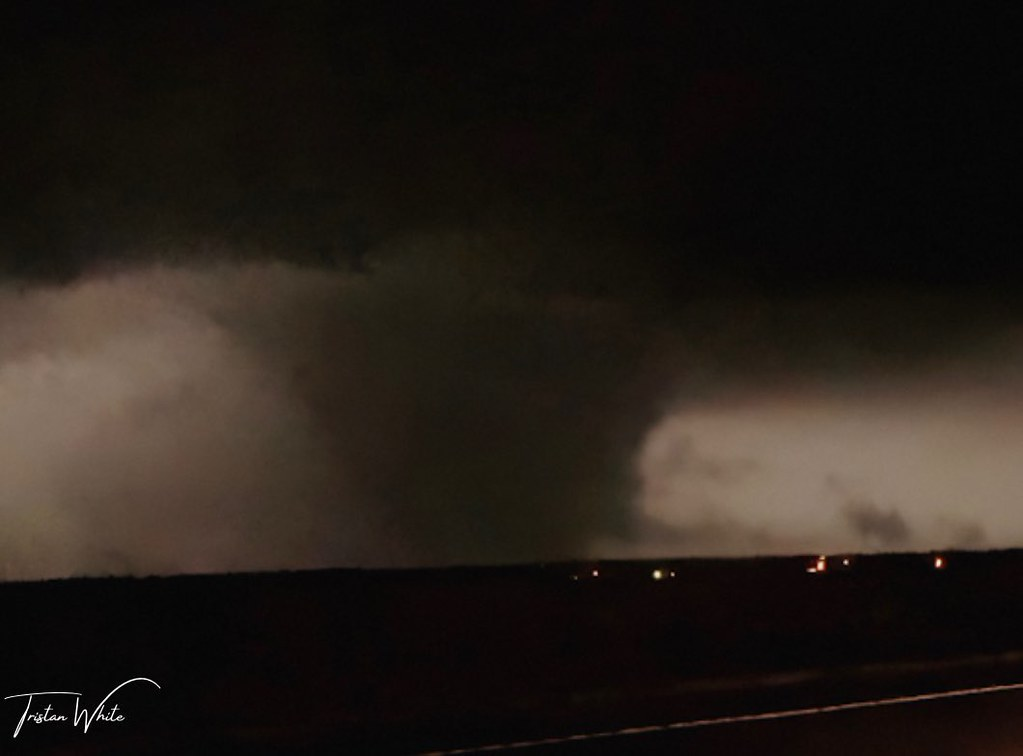
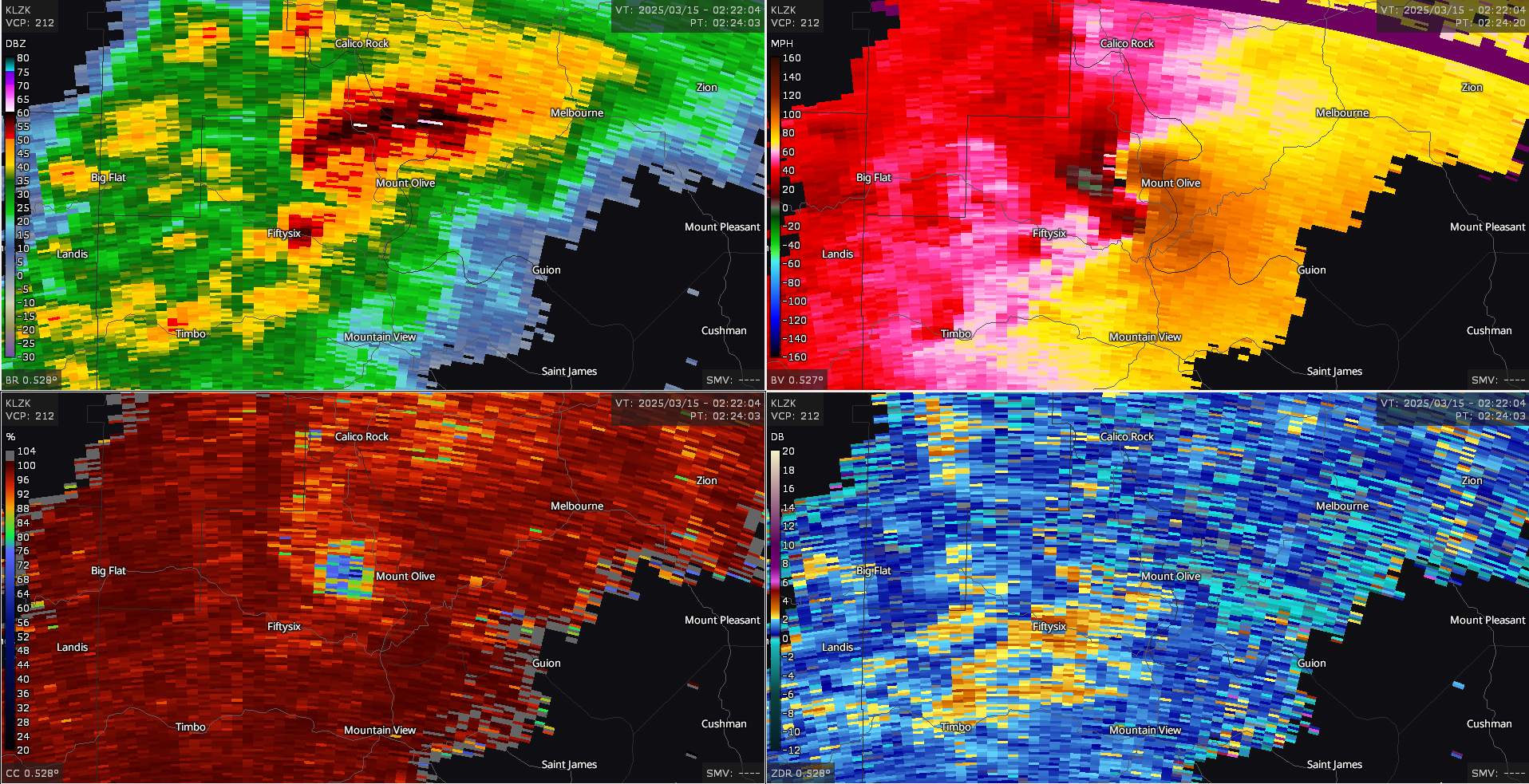
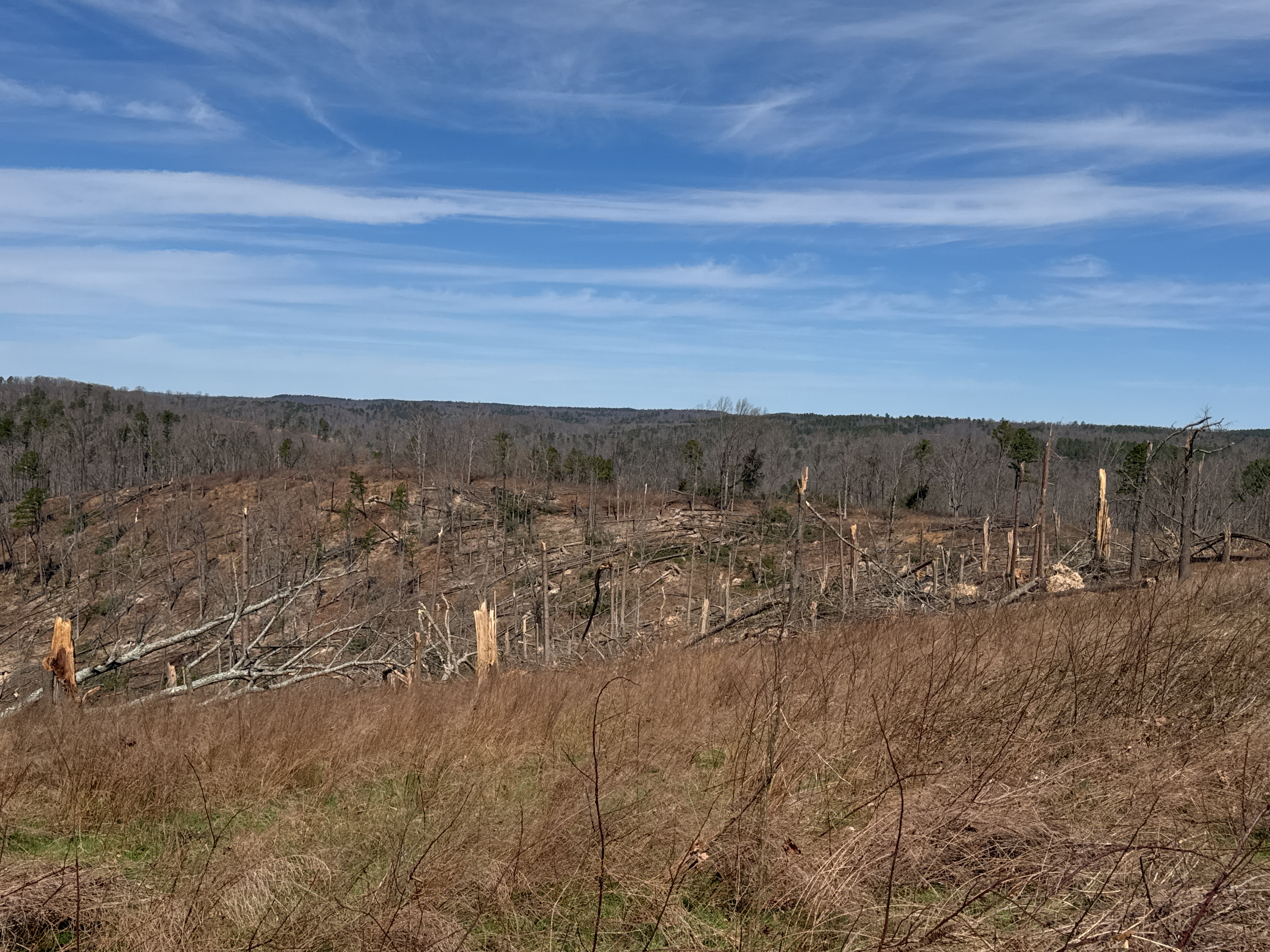
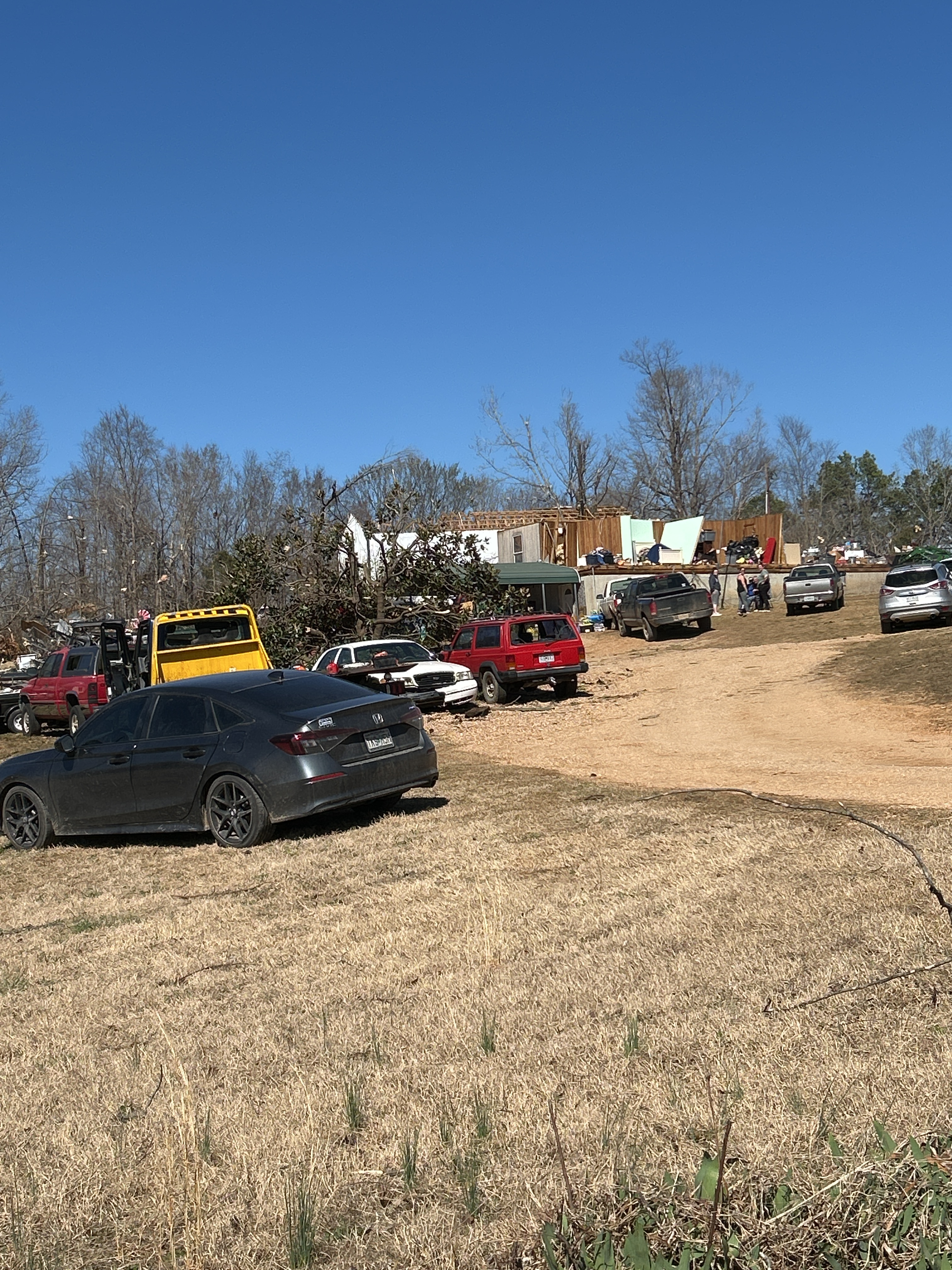
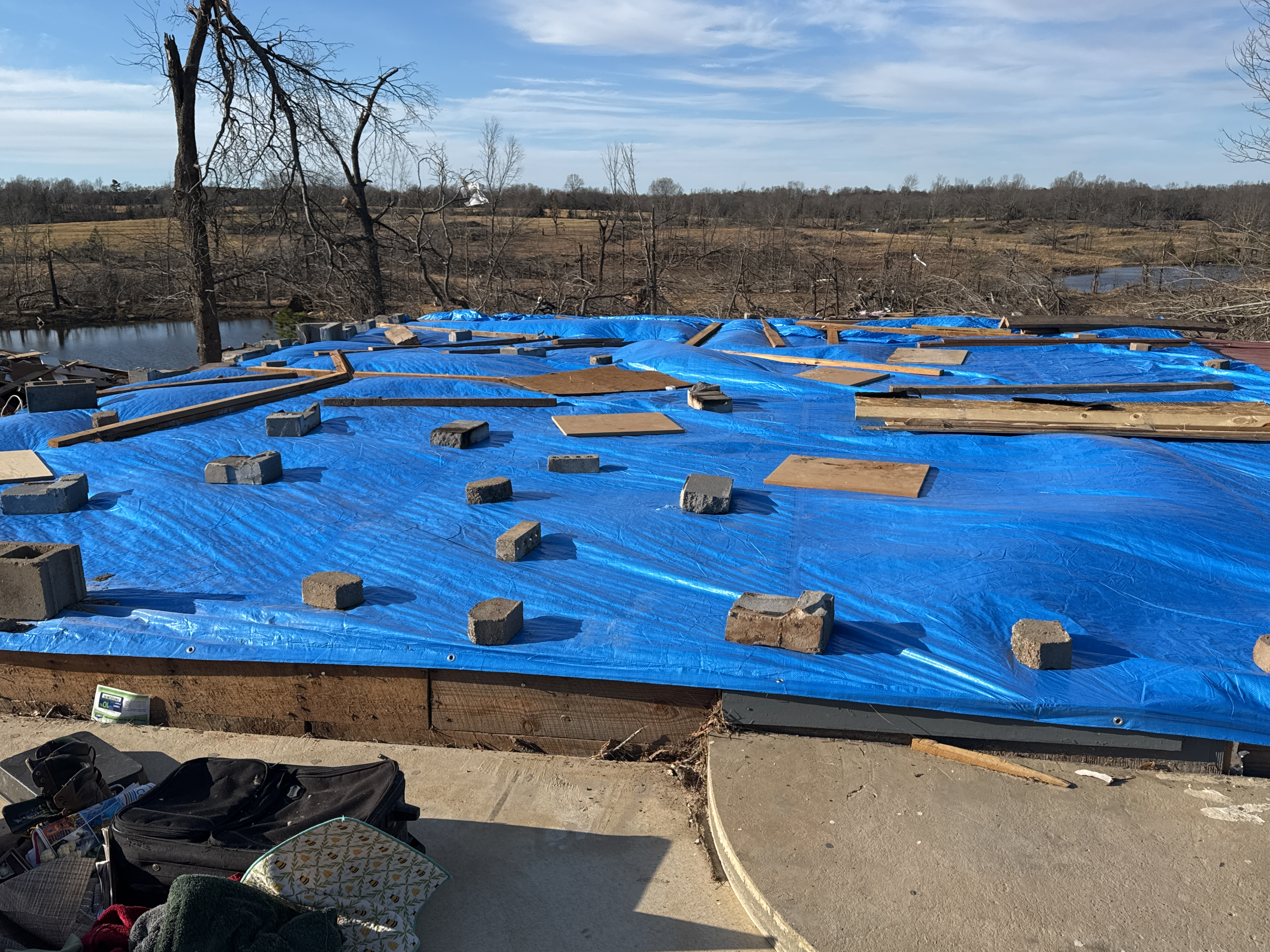
- Clockwise from the top: The tornado seen near Fairdealing, Missouri; forested areas of the Blanchard Springs Caverns leveled by the tornado, where a RAWS unit measured intense winds during the event; low-end EF4 damage to a house along County Road 102 near Larkin, Arkansas; a home damaged at high-end EF2 intensity along County Road 488 near Fairdealing; a Next-Generation Radar scan of the tornado after it impacted Fifty-Six, Arkansas.

Meteorological history
- Formed: March 14, 2025, 9:11 p.m. CDT (UTC–05:00)
- Dissipated: March 14, 2025, 11:24 p.m. CDT (UTC–05:00)
- Duration: 2 hours, 13 minutes

EF4 tornado
- on the Enhanced Fujita scale
- Max width: 1,400 yd (0.80 mi; 1.3 km)
- Path length: 118.96 mi (191.45 km)
- Highest winds: 170 mph (270 km/h)

Overall effects
- Fatalities: 0
- Injuries: 4
- Areas affected: Multiple locations in Stone, Izard, Sharp and Randolph counties, Arkansas to Ripley and Butler counties, Missouri, United States
- Part of the Tornado outbreak of March 14–16, 2025 and Tornadoes of 2025

Throughout the late evening hours of March 14, 2025, a long-tracked EF4 tornado carved a 119 mi (192 km) long path and a 1,400 yd (1.3 km) width as it tore across Stone, Izard, Sharp and Randolph counties in northern Arkansas, as well as Ripley and Butler counties in southeastern Missouri. Part of a historic mid-March tornado outbreak sequence across the central United States, the tornado was the longest-lived and one of the strongest of the 117 tornadoes that occurred during the outbreak, as well as the third longest-tracked tornado in Arkansas history and the longest-tracked tornado of 2025. The tornado was also the first violent (F/EF4+) tornado in Arkansas since the 2014 Mayflower–Vilonia tornado nearly 11 years prior.

In its wake, the tornado passed near or struck the communities of Fifty-Six, Mount Olive, Larkin, Violet Hill, Franklin, Williford, Ravenden Springs, Arkansas; and also around Poynor, Doniphan and Fairdealing, Missouri, across its near 119 mi (192 km) path, causing widespread damage across the region. Despite the length of the tornado, no deaths occurred and only four people were injured, three in Arkansas and one in Missouri.

== Meteorological synopsis ==
=== Episode narrative ===
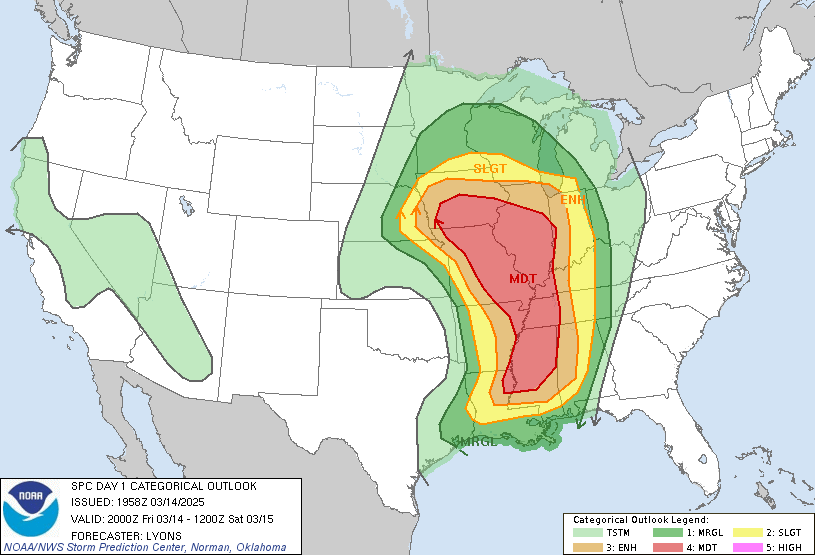
The SPC Day 1 convective outlook for March 14, 2025, at 20:00 UTC, showing the widespread risk of severe weather across the Mississippi Valley and Southeastern United States.

A strong negatively-tilted upper-level shortwave trough detected on satellite on morning of March 14 was expected to produce an intense mid-level jet that followed its parent shortwave and move towards the center of the continental United States. These features produced strong ascent, which, alongside a powerful surface cyclone expected to form and move from the central High Plains towards the Upper Midwest, produced the conditions necessary for the development of significant severe weather, necessitating the issue of a moderate risk for a large portion of the Mississippi Valley by the Storm Prediction Center. Over much of the middle Mississippi Valley, strong diurnal heating was expected to occur, which, alongside a low-level jet to aid boundary-level moisture, allowed for the development of surface-based storms, which were expected to produce a single fast-moving band of convection that was expected to produce gusts up to 80–100 mph (130–160 km/h) over the region.

Further to the southeast over Missouri, forecasters outlined the risk of more discrete thunderstorms developing on the northern edge of a more concentrated area of low-level moisture. These storms were expected to form into at least semi-discrete supercells due to the presence of strong upper-level flow and strong deep-layer shear. The HRRR model suggested that widespread supercells could develop late in the afternoon, potentially as far south as the border of Mississippi, Arkansas, and Tennessee, with soundings of other forecast models, including the NAM model, favoring the development of intense supercells capable of producing large hail of 2–3 in (5.1–7.6 cm) and potentially significant or intense tornadoes.

=== Event narrative ===
The first complex of storms had emerged by 10:25 a.m. Central Daylight Time (UTC–5) over southern Kansas and northeastern Oklahoma, which moved into a region of high atmospheric stability and strong convective inhibition, with a minimal severe hazard risk expected to be limited to small hail up to 1.25 in (3.2 cm). The Storm Prediction Center was expecting the formation of an intense squall line to initiate between 3 and 5 p.m. that afternoon. In the evening, a PDS tornado watch was issued for an area in the Mississippi Valley, with severe thunderstorms expected to develop in conditions primed for supercells capable of producing strong, long-track tornadoes. As forecast, numerous supercells began developing across the main risk area, and began producing tornadoes, some of which have presumably been strong to intense.

== Tornado summary ==
=== Formation and impact on Fifty-Six ===
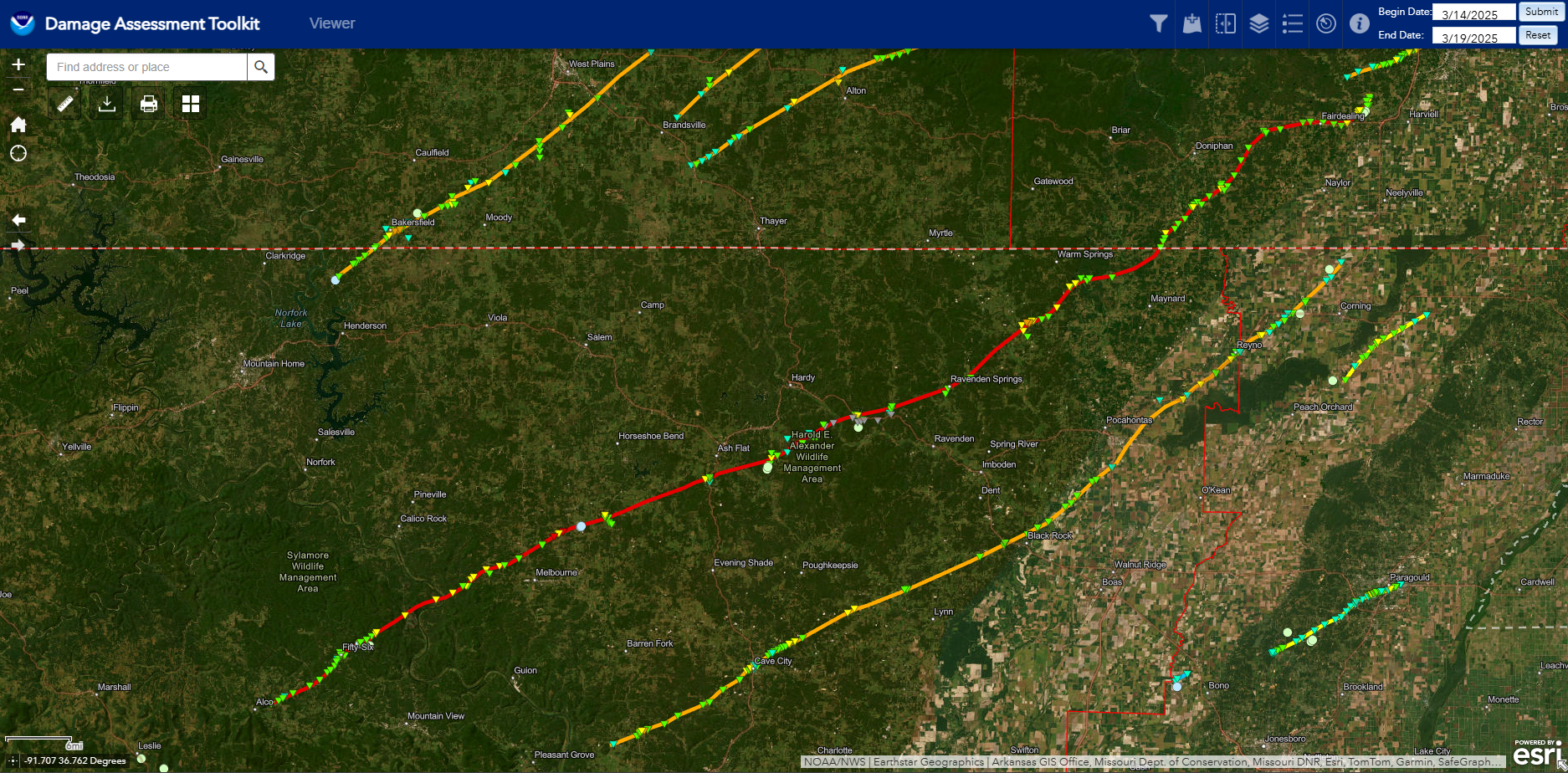
Map of the tornadoes that struck northern Arkansas and southern Missouri on March 14, 2025. Parameters Other (Miscellaneous) Thunderstorm wind EFU / Unknown EF0 / 65–85 mph EF1 / 86–110 mph EF2 / 111–135 mph EF3 / 136–165 mph EF4 / 166–200 mph

The tornado formed along a tree line at EF1 intensity, to the southwest of Fairview Road or northeast of Alco in northwestern Stone County, Arkansas at 9:11 p.m. CDT (02:11 UTC). A few homes along the road were impacted as the tornado was at this weak intensity. Many trees were snapped as the tornado remained mainly insignificant at this point.

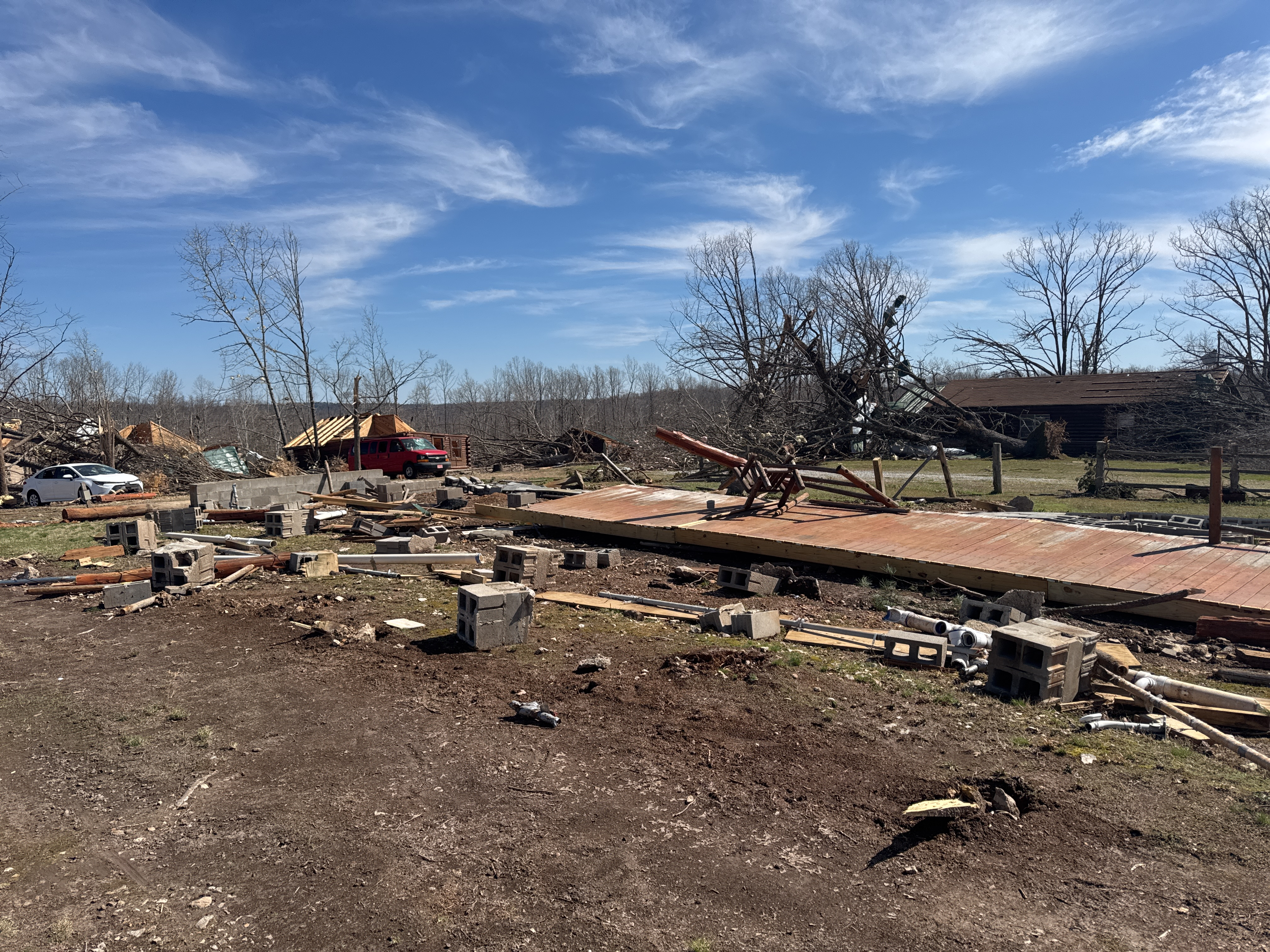
A manufactured residence destroyed at EF3 intensity in Fifty-Six, Arkansas.

As it traversed through forested areas, at 9:26 p.m. CDT (02:26 UTC) a tornado warning was issued by the National Weather Service as the tornado began to approach Fifty-Six and the surrounding areas. Along Roasting Ear Road, the tornado impacted its first structure as it encountered in town; a residence which suffered minor roof damage at EF0 (65-85 MPH) intensity. Continuing along the road into the central part of the community, the tornado abruptly became intense as it crossed AR 14, heavily damaging a barn and a framed house at EF2 intensity, and wiping a manufactured home completely away at EF3 intensity. The unit was lofted hundreds of yards, with its remnants no longer identifiable.

After causing severe damage to these residences, the tornado exited Fifty-Six as it paralleled Rowland Cave Road. To the northeast, the tornado impacted the Blanchard Springs Caverns area, where a Remote Automated Weather Station (RAWS) recorded intense winds of 151 mph (243 km/h). The tornado would continue northeastward, damaging many trees at EF2 intensity as it tracked through northern Stone County, northwest of Mount Olive.

=== Peak intensity in Izard County ===
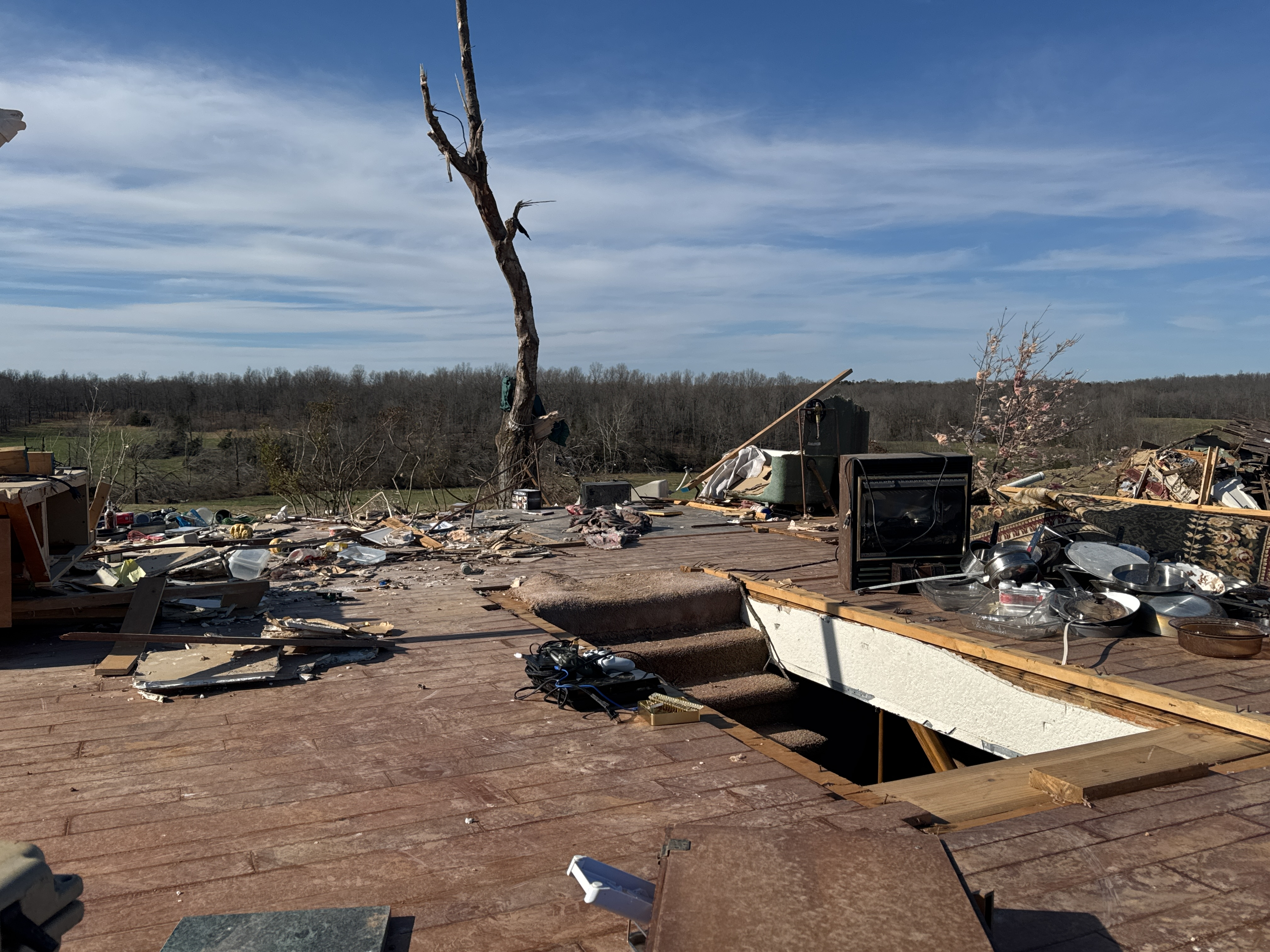
EF4 damage to a large farmhouse in the Larkin area; south of Violet Hill, Arkansas.

Crossing the White River, the tornado entered Izard County at EF2 intensity. It immediately struck areas in southern Boswell with significant strength, with hundreds of trees uprooted in the area. The tornado then paralleled Jumbo and crossed Preacher Roads, snapping more trees and one wooden electrical pole, as well as destroying an outbuilding at EF2 intensity northwest of Jumbo. EF2 damage persisted as the track passed west of the city of Melbourne before the tornado weakened down to EF1 intensity.

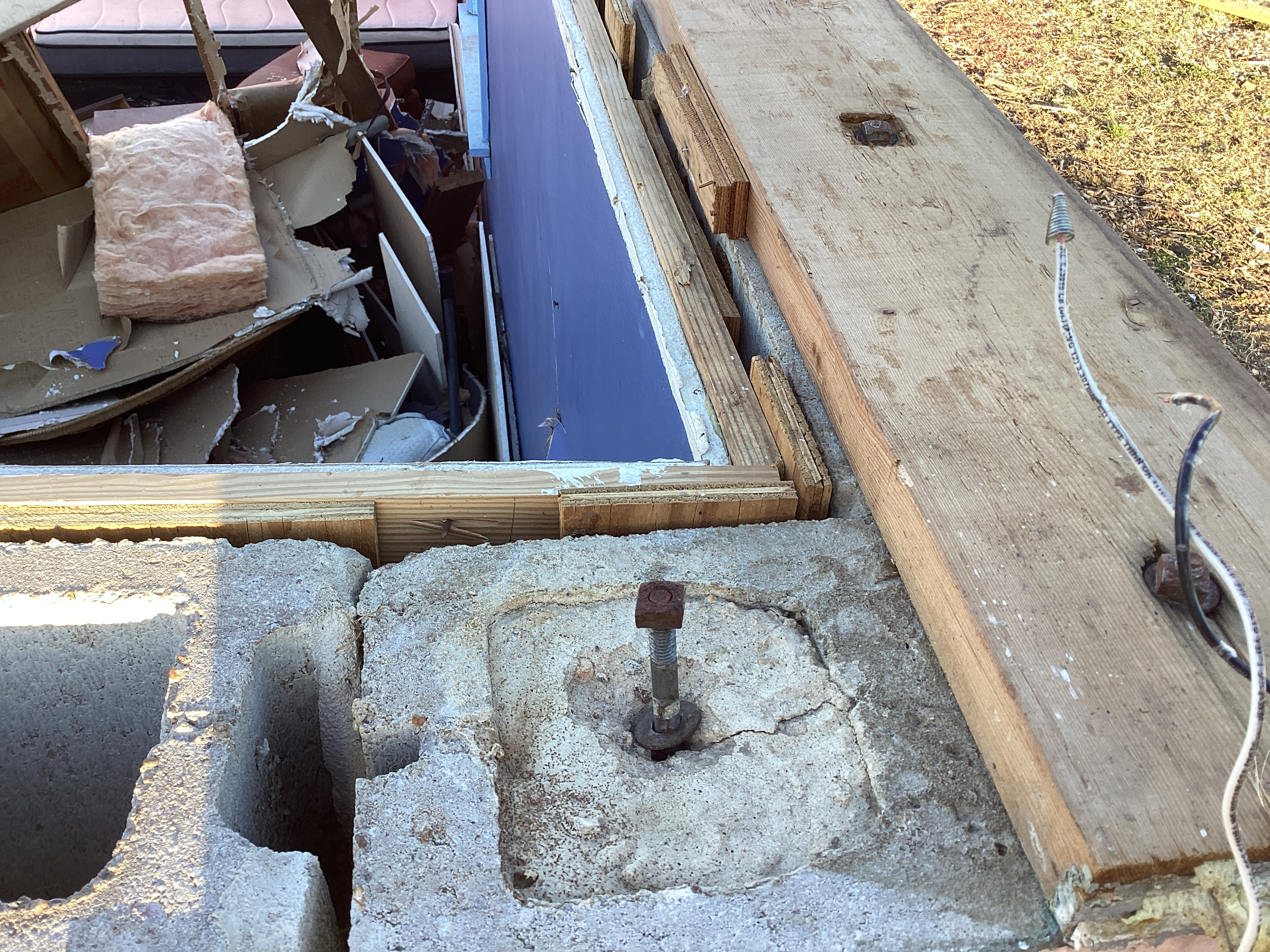
Visible anchor bolts are seen from a house destroyed at EF4 intensity in northeastern Izard County, Arkansas.

Southwest of Violet Hill, the tornado would abruptly reach EF4 intensity for the first time as it impacted the Larkin area. Along County Road 102, the now violent tornado would completely destroy a house as it collapsed all of its walls, strewing debris downwind and throwing a car into a nearby lake. The tornado then weakened back to EF2 intensity, wiping away a barn where a tractor inside was blown over to its side, and destroying a poultry house near the intersection of County Road 15 and McCollum Drive. Along the latter, the tornado would reach violent status for a second time, as a large farmhouse was leveled at EF4 intensity. One person was in the basement of the home at the time the tornado struck, surviving with no injuries reported. Once again, the tornado weakened down to EF2 intensity as it continued its path to the east-northeast. As the tornado approached Caston Road, intersecting with Ebi Quarry Lane, another home would be leveled away as it passed through. Encroaching County Road 57, just south of Franklin, the tornado would for a third time become violent, obliterating a house at EF4 intensity. A nearby auto repair shop was completely destroyed at EF3 intensity, and a mobile home frame was left unrecognizable after being thrown from an unknown location per a National Weather Service damage surveyor. A metal building along the county road was damaged at EF2 intensity, as it was impacted on the north side of the tornado. After causing considerable levels of damage, the tornado weakened down to EF1 intensity before again increasing to EF2 intensity, as it tracked through forested areas and some occasional fields in eastern Izard County before exiting the area.

=== Track through Sharp and Randolph Counties ===
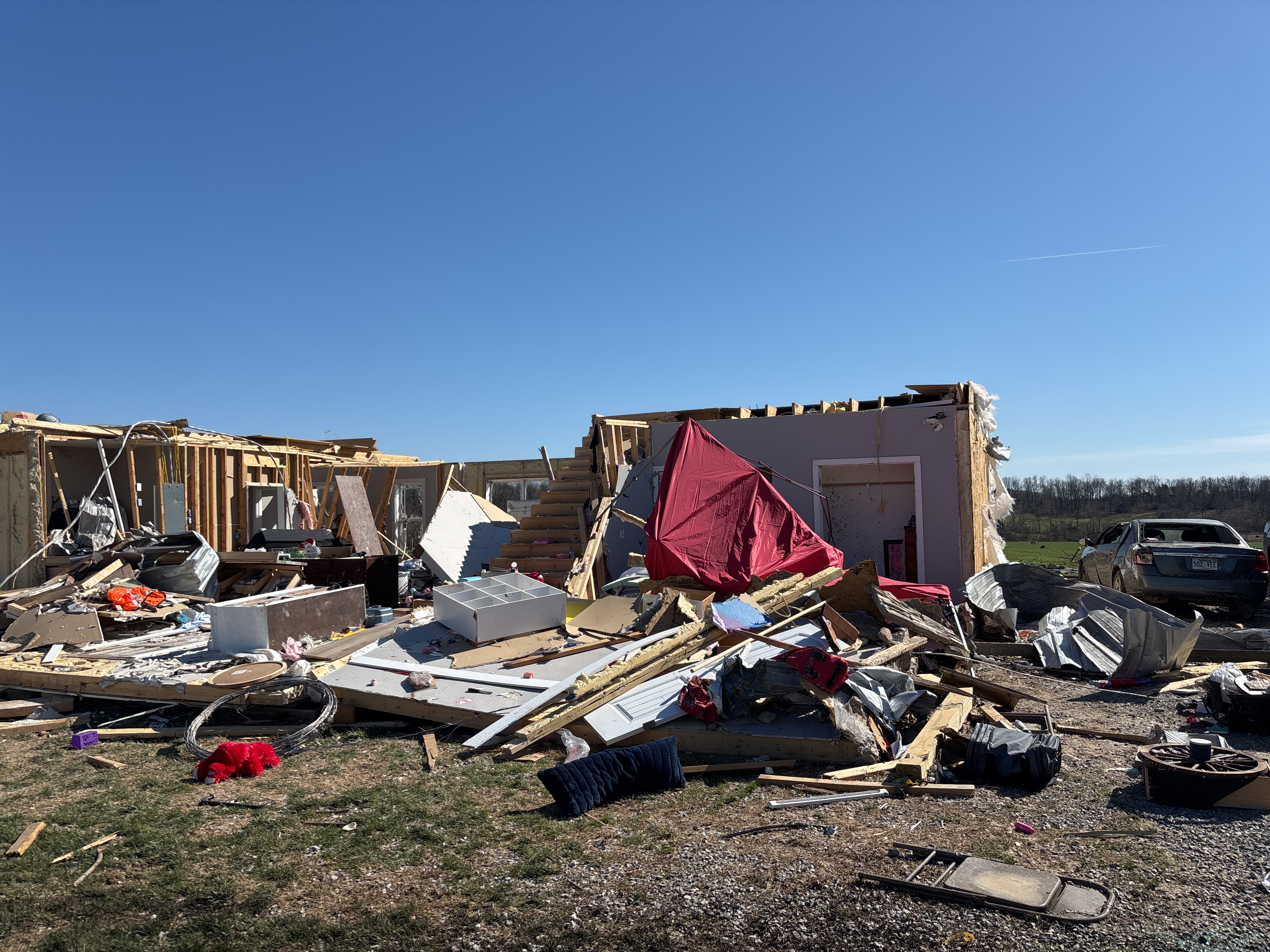
High-end EF3 damage to a home near Elevenpoint, Arkansas.

Now entering Sharp County, the tornado continued its destruction of forested areas it was passing through prior to crossing county lines, as hundreds of trees were destroyed at EF2 intensity. Continuing at this significant strength, south-southwest of Ash Flat a farmstead was impacted by the tornado. The property residence had its windows shattered, while a nearby farm shed was destroyed. Traversing through the wooded landscape, south of the outskirts of Highland, another rural residence was impacted at EF2 intensity, with its exterior walls collapsed. After moving through the Harold E. Alexander Wildlife Management Area and crossing the Spring River, another instance of EF2 damage occurred as the tornado traveled north of Williford, where an unanchored house blown off the concrete block foundation and a barn which had parts of its roof torn off, before leaving Sharp County and weakening down to EF1 intensity. The tornado then entered Randolph County, immediately beelining for Ravenden Springs. Despite the direct impact on the town itself, no significant damage occurred by the tornado, as it remained at EF1 intensity upon passing through. The track continued through northern Randolph County, with no considerable damage higher than EF2 inflicted to structures and vegetation. The tornado then began to intensify abruptly as it was passing west of Hamil. Here, the tornado caused EF3 damage to a chicken farm. The farmhouse residing on the property was heavily destroyed, with mainly its interior walls left standing, and a nearby metal building was completely destroyed and twisted of its steel beams. Numerous instances of EF2 damage was inflicted nearby, including an anchored garage that was completely swept clean of debris. After that, the tornado persisted to the northeast, with more EF2 damage spread across the final miles of its track within extreme northern Randolph County, before it exited the state of Arkansas completely.

=== Continuation into Missouri and dissipation ===
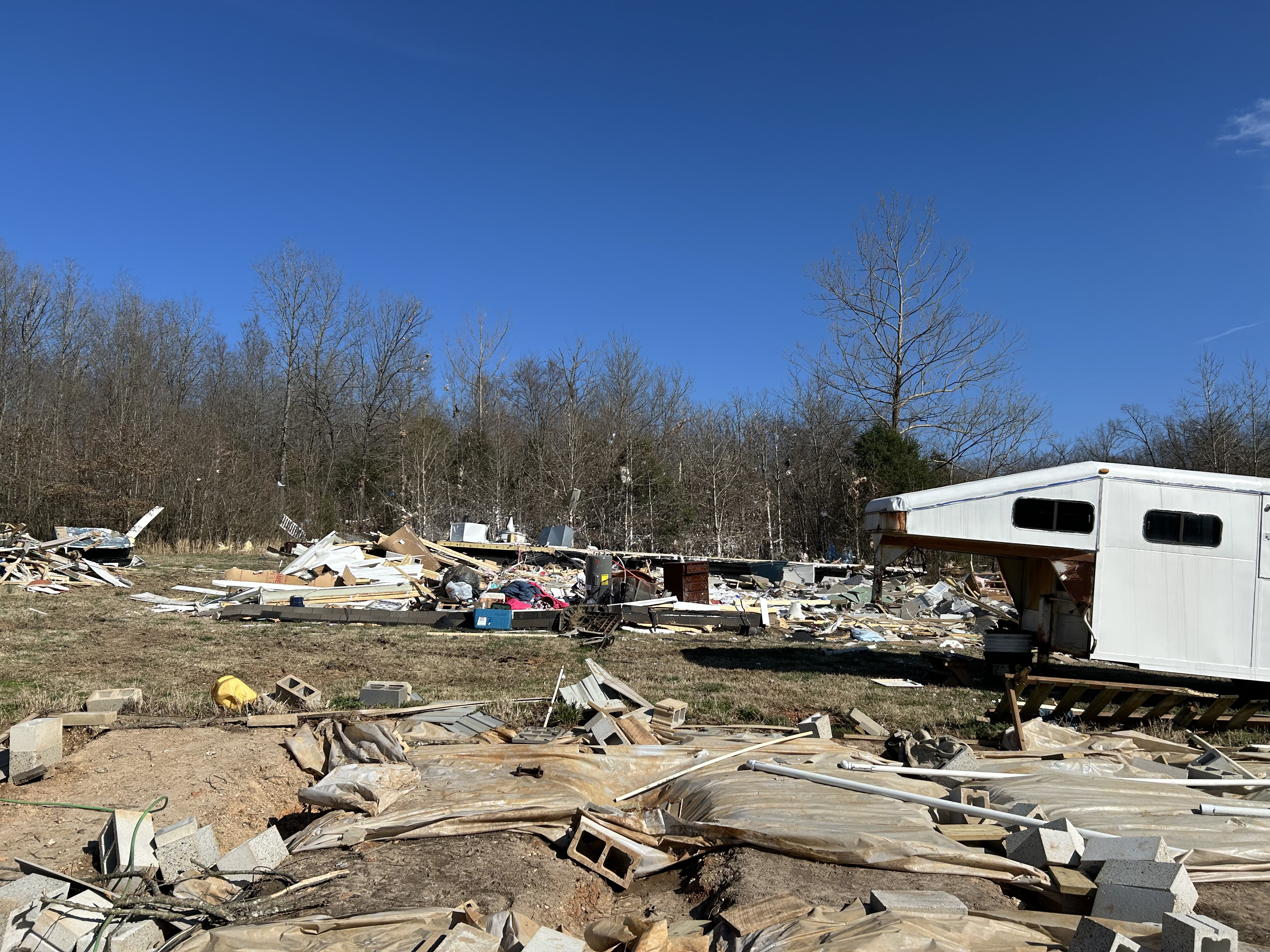
EF2 damage to a mobile home, which was completely destroyed to the east of Poynor, Missouri. The resident sought shelter in a bath tub here and survived.

After causing EF4 damage along a near 94 mi (151 km) track across Arkansas, the storm crossed state lines and entered Ripley County, Missouri, to the southeast of Poynor at EF1 intensity as many trees were snapped. Passing directly east of Poynor, the tornado strengthened to EF2 intensity, completely destroying a mobile home, where the resident was sheltering inside a bath tub and survived with relatively minor injuries. The tornado fluctuated in intensity at this point, as it caused for most parts EF1-EF2 damage to homes, poles and trees as it was passing southeast of Doniphan. To the northeast of the Ripley County seat, the tornado made an abrupt turn to the east, towards the community of Fairdealing. Weak damage ensued as the tornado went directly through, paralleling US 160 to its south and causing EF2 roof damage to a home to the east along the highway. The occluding tornado then began to veer to the north, causing a relatively lengthened area of EF2 damage to homes along County Road 488, and a more localized spot next to Highway F. After traveling for just under 119 mi (192 km) across the northern and southeastern portions of Arkansas and Missouri, the tornado dissipated northwest of Harviell, Missouri at 11:24 p.m. CDT (04:24 UTC) after remaining on the ground for 2 hours and 13 minutes.

After the EF4 tornado dissipated in Butler County, the parent supercell responsible this long-lived tornado dropped another intense tornado that impacted Poplar Bluff, Missouri, killing one person along a 17.92 mi (28.84 km) path.

== Aftermath & Statistics ==
=== Historical feats and statistics ===
==== Preliminary surveys ====
National Weather Service preliminary damage surveys on March 18, 2025

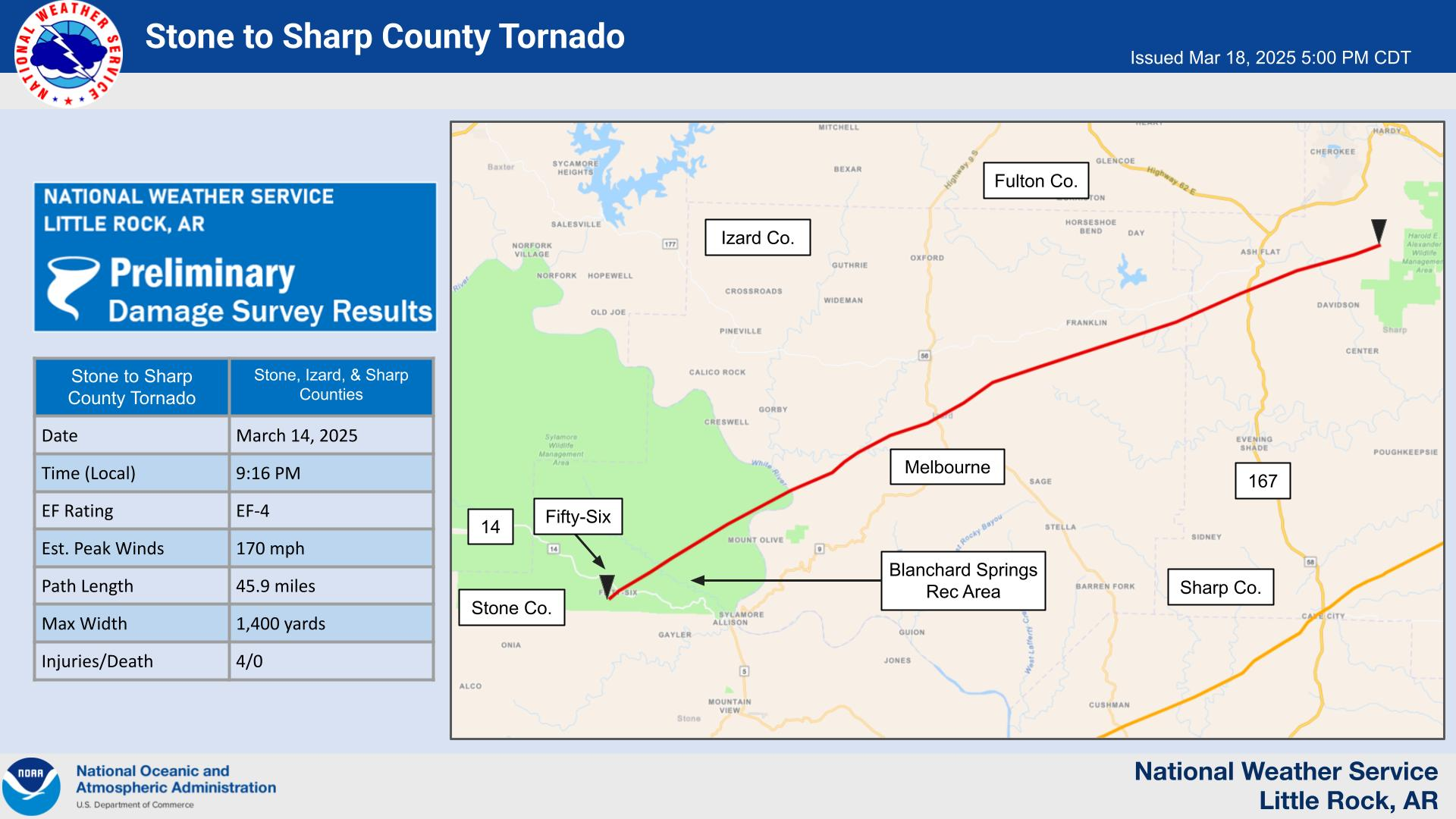
Map of the Stone–Sharp County, Arkansas EF4 tornado.

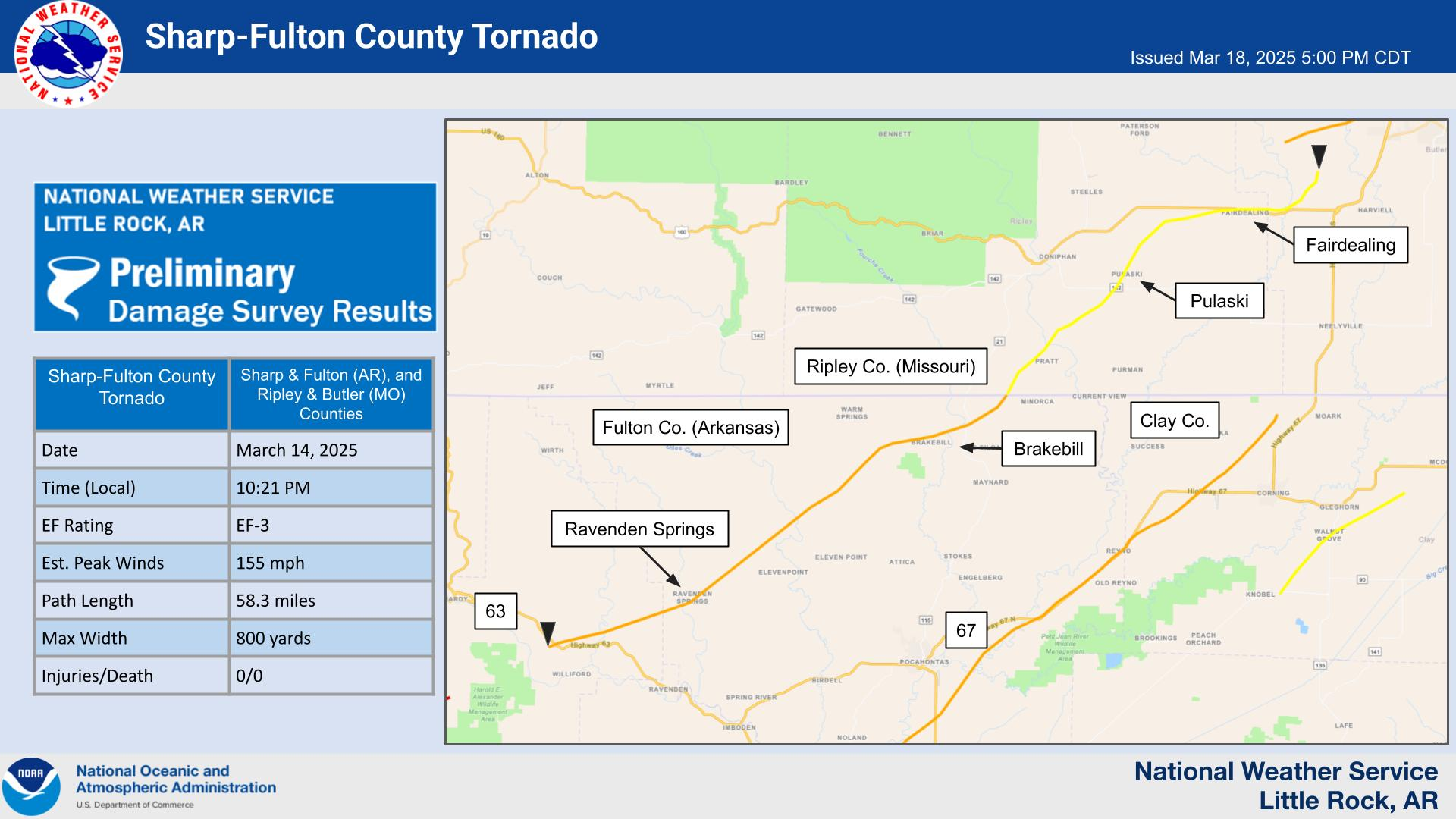
Map of the Sharp–Fulton County, Arkansas EF3 tornado, extending to Butler County, Missouri as an EF2.

On March 18, preliminary damage assessments by the National Weather Service office in Little Rock, Arkansas confirmed two separate tornado tracks across northern Arkansas. The first section was rated low-end EF4 with winds of 170 mph (270 km/h) along a 45.9 mi (73.9 km) path from Stone to Sharp counties. The second portion was rated high-end EF3 with winds of 155 mph (249 km/h) and a 58.3 mi (93.8 km) path from Sharp County, Arkansas to Butler County, Missouri. On April 16, the neighboring National Weather service office in Paducah, Kentucky, released a public statement regarding the track estimate of the tornadoes. The two tracks of both the EF3 and EF4 tornadoes, were merged into one, long path spanning 117.15 mi (188.53 km) from Stone County, Arkansas to Butler County, Missouri in both National Weather Service offices' county warning areas.

==== Statistics and records ====
The tornado was the first F/EF4+ tornado of the 2025 tornado season and the first of three during the outbreak, along with a violent, high-end EF4 tornado that destroyed a farmstead and homes in Jackson County, Arkansas, and an additional long-tracked, deadly EF4 tornado the following day that went through portions of Louisiana and Mississippi. It was also the first EF4 tornado to occur in Arkansas since a devastating EF4 tornado struck Mayflower and Vilonia in 2014. With the previously mentioned EF4 tornado the same night in Jackson County on March 14, this was the first time multiple violent tornadoes struck Arkansas since March 1, 1997. That day, a couple F4 tornadoes occurred in the central and eastern parts of the state.

Along its 2-hour and 13-minute lifespan, the tornado traveled 118.96 mi (191.45 km) through both portions of Arkansas and Missouri, with a width of 1,400 yd (0.80 mi; 1.3 km) at its maximum size. Despite its intensity and extremely long track, only four people were injured; three in Arkansas and one in Missouri as the tornado mainly went over sparsely populated areas of the Ozark Highlands. Its fast forward speed and long life made it the third longest tracked tornado in Arkansas history since 1950, with a 93.58 mi (150.60 km) track within the state. It was the first tornado to track nearly 100 mi (160 km) in Arkansas since a similar but lethal EF4 tornado impacted nearby areas during the early 2008 season, killing 13.

=== Damage & Recovery ===
On the night of March 14, 2025, northern Arkansas was struck by two long tracked tornadoes. The long-lived EF4 tornado was the first of the two, with the other being a deadly EF3 tornado that impacted near Cushman and directly Cave City. However, the more significant EF4 tornado caused extensive damage throughout Stone, Izard, Sharp, Randolph, Ripley and Butler counties in both Arkansas and Missouri, predominantly the community of Fifty-Six, Arkansas but also within rural portions of Izard County, where many homes were destroyed and roads were blocked by downed trees and powerlines. Back in Fifty-Six, 26 structures were considered totaled and another 24 deemed damaged according Earnestdine McDaniel, the mayor of Fifty-Six on March 18. Recovery was immediate, as volunteers and donations helped the community during its first steps of recovery in the leadings after the tornado. In Randolph County, Arkansas on May 14, two months after the tornado, recovery continued across rural parts of the county. 33 homes were reportedly damaged by the tornado, alongside countless trees, powerlines and roads. Though steady, management was overwhelming for much of the population as funds, manpower and equipment for recovery was limited according to Randolph County Judge Ben Wicker. In early April of 2025, another major tornado outbreak and flood event that impacted parts of eastern Arkansas halted rebuilding and cleanup efforts that were ongoing at the time.

==== Statewide assistance and denial of federal aid ====
On April 11, President Donald Trump, during his second term, denied a federal aid request to Arkansas, which was issued by Arkansas governor Sarah Sanders on March 21, in response to the tornadoes on March 14, alongside Mississippi for its tornadoes on the 15th. According to the Trump administration, damage from the tornadoes wasn't deemed enough to grant a federal aid package as to be beyond the capabilities of the state of Arkansas, its affected local governments and voluntary agencies. Federal assistance was granted for the floods that occurred on April 2 almost instantly after. The aid for the April 2 floods were only allowed for the counties affected during the event, and couldn't be used to help other counties that were affected by the tornadoes on March 14. This caused Sanders to file an immediate appeal to Trump to reconsider his statement on April 18. According to a preliminary survey done by FEMA, 456 residences were impacted in Arkansas, with 156 considered destroyed and 93 with major damage. Trump did declare that a major disaster exists in Arkansas at the time on May 8 and granted access to the Individual Assistance program for affected residents across Greene, Hot Spring and Lawrence counties, alongside Independence, Izard, Jackson, Randolph, Sharp and Stone counties.

Meanwhile in Missouri, on May 24, FEMA gave way to federal aid after Trump approved a major disaster declaration issued by Missouri governor Mike Kehoe. Residents in 18 Missouri counties, listed as Bollinger, Callaway, Carter, Dunklin, Franklin, Howell, Iron, Madison, New Madrid, Oregon, Ozark, Perry, Phelps, Reynolds, Scott, Shannon, Stoddard and Wayne counties, as well as Butler and Ripley counties impacted by the March 14 tornadoes, alongside straight-line winds and wildfires were eligible for reparations under FEMA's Public Assistance program.

==== Reversal of Trump administration's consideration ====
On May 13, the Trump administration reversed their stance and approved a FEMA assistance package to Arkansas for the March 14 tornadoes. The assistance included temporary housing, home repairs, low-interest loans for uninsured losses to property and other programs to aid victims in their recovery.

On January 14, 2026, Arkansas governor Sarah Sanders added an additional $10,000 USD in state recovery funds to the already authorized $380,000 USD she issued for the March 14, 2025 tornadoes. The state's emergency management director, A.J. Gary had the order of the discretion of monetary funds, on “defraying program and administrative costs," according to this order.

== See also ==
- Tornadoes of 2025
- List of F4, EF4, and IF4 tornadoes
  - List of F4, EF4, and IF4 tornadoes (2020–present)
- List of North American tornadoes and tornado outbreaks
