= Poynor =

Poynor may refer to:

== Places ==
- Poynor, Texas, a town in Henderson County, Texas, United States
- Poynor, Missouri, an unincorporated community in Ripley County, Missouri, United States

== People with the surname ==
- Rick Poynor, British writer
