= Sano =

Sano may refer to:

== Geography ==
- Sano, Kentucky, U.S.
- Sano, Tochigi, Japan
- Monte Sano Mountain, a mountain in Alabama, United States
  - Monte Sano State Park
- Wai Sano, a volcano in Flores, Indonesia

== Fiction ==
- Sano (Rurouni Kenshin), a character in Rurouni Kenshin media
- Sano Ichirō, a samurai detective from a mystery novel series by Laura Joh Rowland
- Izumi Sano, a character from the manga series Hana-Kimi by Hisaya Nakajo
- Seiichhiro Sano, a character from The Law of Ueki

== Other uses ==
- Sano (company), an Israeli manufacturer of chemical products
- Sano (surname), Japanese surname
- Sano di Pietro (1406–1481), early Italian Renaissance painter
- A defunct brand of cigarettes from United States Tobacco Company endorsed by Martin Kane, Private Eye
