= Fairdealing, Missouri =

- Census-designated place and unincorporated community
- Location of Fairdealing within the state of Missouri
- Coordinates: 36°39′42″N 90°35′30″W
- Country: United States
- State: Missouri
- County: Ripley, Butler

Area
  - Total: 5.71 sq mi (14.79 km^{2})
  - Land: 5.70 sq mi (14.77 km^{2})
  - Water: 0.0077 sq mi (0.02 km^{2})
- Elevation: 459 ft (140 m)

Population (2020)
  - Total: 543
  - Density: 95.2/sq mi (36.77/km^{2})
- ZIP code: 63939
- Area code: 573
- FIPS code: 29-23248
- GNIS feature ID: 2587068

Fairdealing is an unincorporated community and census-designated place located in northeastern Ripley County and western Butler County in southeastern Missouri, United States. As of the 2020 census, the community had a population of 543. It is located along U.S. Route 160, approximately 16 miles (26 km) southwest of Poplar Bluff.

A post office has been in operation at Fairdealing since 1883. Several traditions attempt to explain the name.

== History ==
On March 14, 2025, an EF4 tornado struck the community at EF2 strength, which caused damage to homes, trees, and power poles in the area.

== Demographics ==
Historical population
Census	Pop.	Note	%±
2020	543		—
U.S. Decennial Census
