= Larkin, Arkansas =

- Unincorporated community
- Location within Arkansas Location within the United States
- Coordinates: 36°06′42.25″N 91°52′04.53″W
- Country: United States
- State: Arkansas
- County: Izard
- Elevation: 781 ft (238 m)
- Time zone: UTC-6 (CST)
  - Summer (DST): UTC-5 (CDT)
- GNIS feature ID: 58047

Larkin is an unincorporated community in Izard County, Arkansas, United States.

== History ==
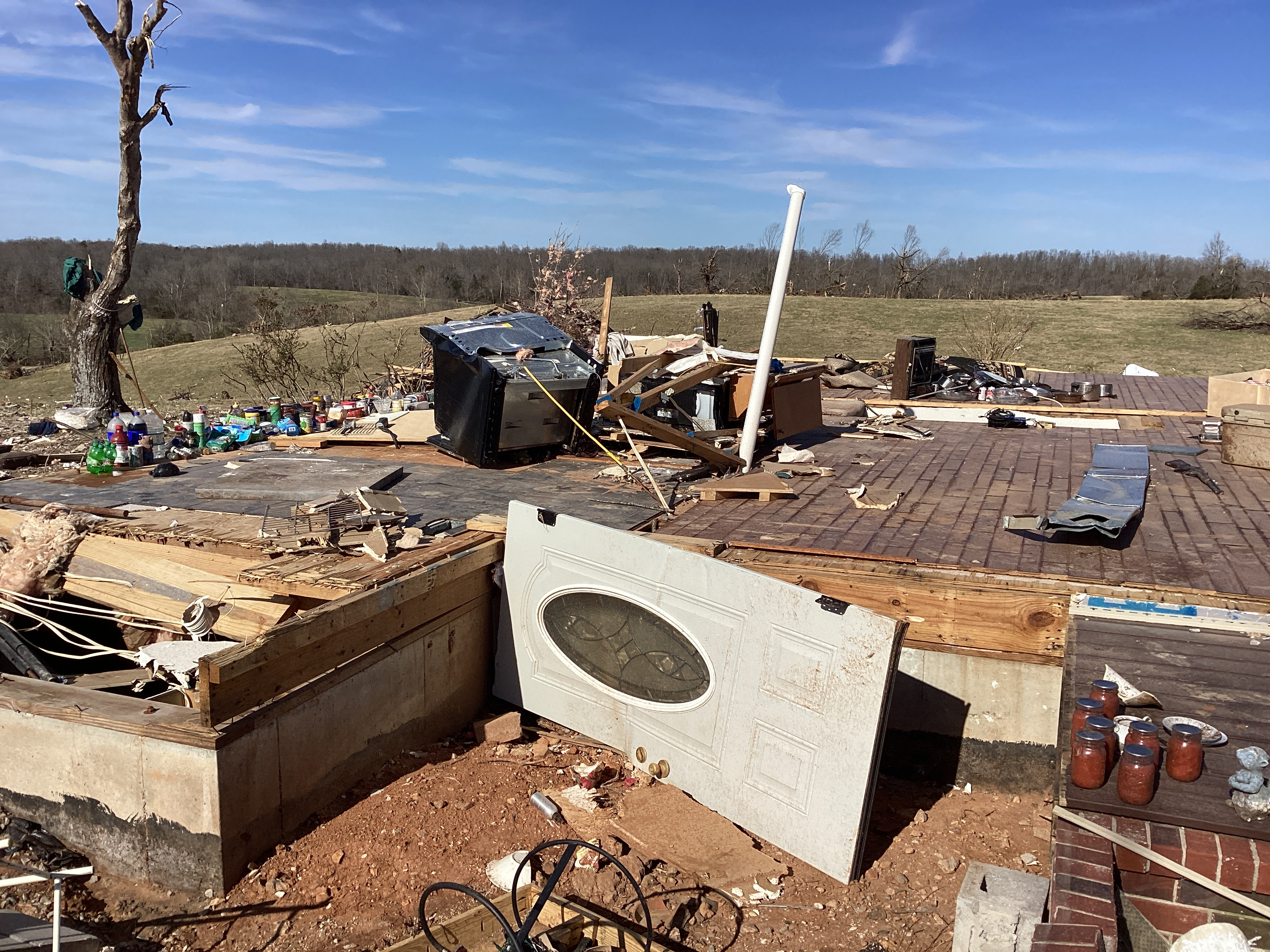
A two-story home in Larkin was swept away by the tornado at EF4 intensity.

Larkin was hit by an EF4 tornado on March 14, 2025 that completely destroyed two houses in the community.
