= Poynor, Missouri =

Unincorporated community in Missouri, U.S.

Coordinates: 36°31′13″N 90°54′25″W

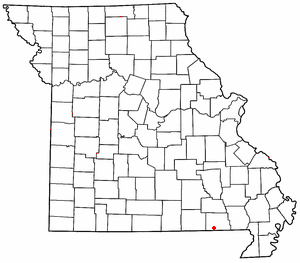

Poynor is an unincorporated community in southern Ripley County, Missouri, United States. It is located on Route 21, approximately seven miles southwest of Doniphan. It lies about 1.5 miles north of the Missouri-Arkansas border.

== History ==
A post office called Poynor was established in 1891, and remained in operation until 1992. The community has the name of Marion C. Poynor, a local merchant.
