= Zion, Arkansas =

- Unincorporated community
- Location within Arkansas Location within the United States
- Coordinates: 36°4′49″N 91°46′12″W
- Country: United States
- State: Arkansas
- County: Izard
- Township: Pleasant Hill
- Elevation: 692 ft (211 m)
- Time zone: UTC-6 (Central (CST))
  - Summer (DST): UTC-5 (CDT)
- Area code: 870
- GNIS feature ID: 56626

Zion is an unincorporated community in Izard County, Arkansas, United States.
