= Happy Bend, Arkansas =

- Unincorporated community
- Happy Bend's position in Arkansas. Happy Bend, Arkansas (the United States)
- Coordinates: 35°15′50″N 92°52′03″W
- Country: United States
- State: Arkansas
- County: Pope
- Elevation: 318 ft (97 m)
- Time zone: UTC-6 (Central (CST))
  - Summer (DST): UTC-5 (CDT)
- GNIS feature ID: 57879

Happy Bend is an unincorporated community in Wilson Township, Pope County, Arkansas, United States.
