= Sano, Kentucky =

Unincorporated community in Kentucky, United States

Sano
- Unincorporated community
- Location within the state of Kentucky Sano (the United States)
- Coordinates: 37°6′30″N 85°6′13″W
- Country: United States
- State: Kentucky
- County: Russell
- Elevation: 1,020 ft (310 m)
- Time zone: UTC-6 (Central (CST))
  - Summer (DST): UTC-5 (EDT)
- GNIS feature ID: 509013

Sano is an unincorporated community located in Russell County, Kentucky, United States.
