= Special routes of U.S. Route 63 =

Special routes of U.S. Route 63

Highway system
- United States Numbered Highway System; List; Special; Divided

Twelve special routes of U.S. Route 63 currently exist. Arkansas and Missouri each contain five, with two in Iowa. There are also five former routings that have been removed from the system.

== Arkansas ==
=== Hermitage business route ===
U.S. Highway 63B
- Location: Hermitage, Arkansas
- Length: 0.838 mi (1,349 m)
- Existed: January 11, 2000–present

U.S. Route 63 Business (US 63B and Hwy. 63B) is a 0.838-mile (1.349 km) business route of U.S. Route 63 in the small town of Hermitage, Arkansas.

US 63B begins at US 63 in Hermitage in South Arkansas. Highway 160 also comes into this junction along US 63, turning south at the junction. US 63B runs north as Main Street, passing through the commercial district of the town before turning right onto Grand Avenue. Now running east, US 63B passes one block north of the historic Hermitage City Hall and Jail and Hermitage Volunteer Fire Department before continuing east and terminating at US 63.

The designation was created by the Arkansas State Highway Commission along a former segment of US 63 on January 11, 2000.

Major intersections

The entire route is in Bradley County.

Location	mi	km	Destinations	Notes
0.000	0.000	US 63 / AR 160 (Main Street)	Southern terminus	
0.838	1.349	US 63	Northern terminus	
1.000 mi = 1.609 km; 1.000 km = 0.621 mi

=== Warren business route ===
U.S. Highway 63B
- Location: Warren, Arkansas
- Length: 2.699 mi (4.344 km)
- Existed: October 2, 1999–present

U.S. Route 63 Business (US 63B and Hwy. 63B) is a 2.699-mile (4.344 km) business route of U.S. Route 63 in Warren, the county seat of Bradley County, Arkansas.

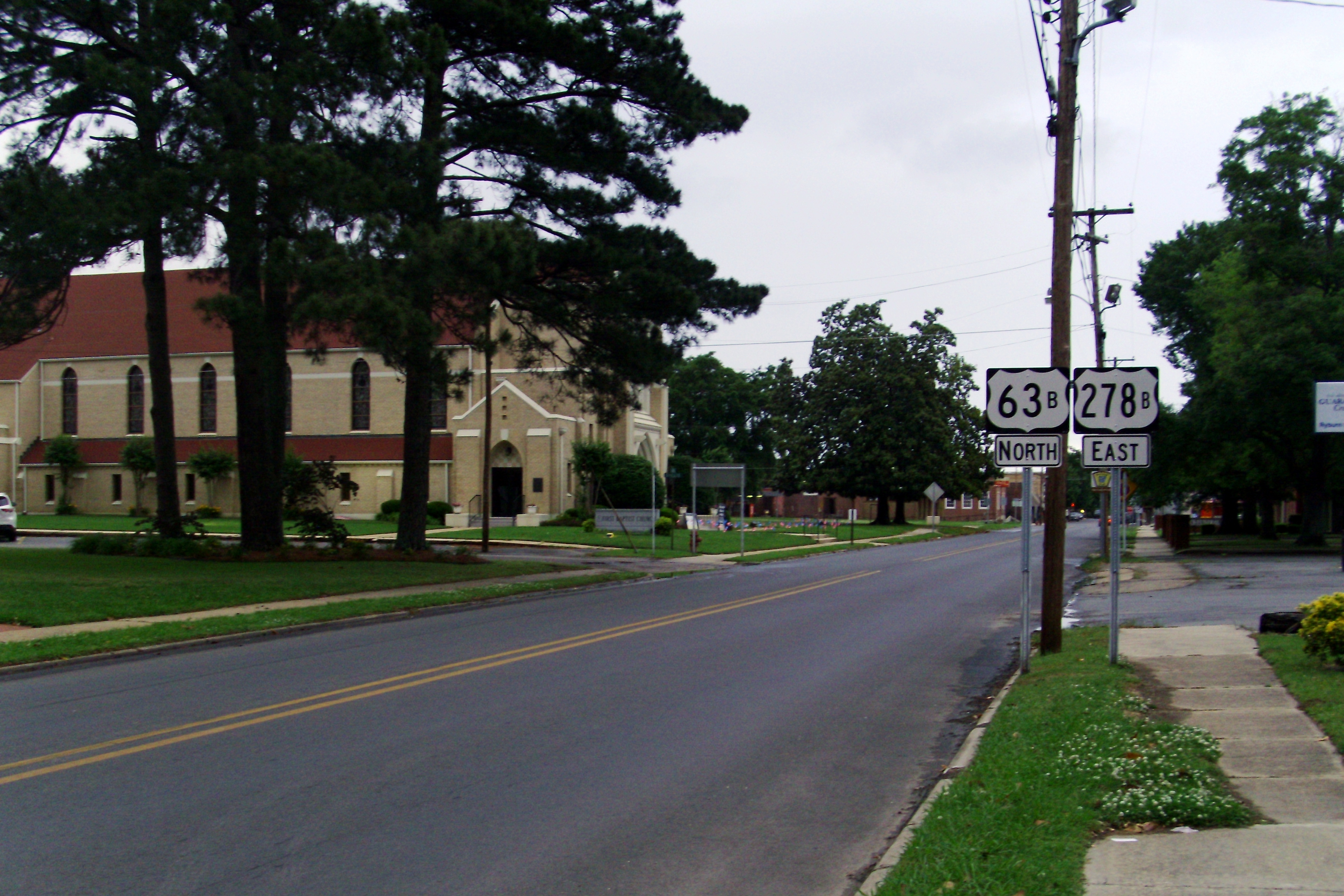
First reassurance markers northbound of a combined US 63B and US 278B in Warren

The route's southern terminus is at US 63 at the northern city limits of Warren. The junction also serves as the northern terminus of Highway 189. US 63B runs south as Myrtle Street (past Warren High School) until turning onto Bond Street near the Davis-Adams House, listed on the National Register of Historic Places (NRHP). After one block, the route turns south onto Main Street and runs through downtown Warren. Passing historic structures, including the Bradley County Courthouse and Clerk's Office, Blankinship Motor Company Building, Warren Post Office, and the Ederington House (all NRHP listed). Between Church Street and Central Street the highway overlaps with US 278B. After the Central Street intersection, US 63B runs south to terminate at its parent route.

The route was created by the Arkansas State Highway Commission as Highway 15 Business (AR 15B) along a former alignment of AR 15 following completion of a bypass around downtown Warren. Shortly thereafter, the route was renumbered to US 63B when US 63 supplanted AR 15 as part of an extension south from West Memphis to Ruston, Louisiana; approved by AASHTO on October 2, 1999.

Major intersections

The entire route is in Bradley County.

mi	km	Destinations	Notes
0.000	0.000	US 63 / AR 8	Southern terminus
1.05– 1.26	1.69– 2.03	US 278B (Central Street / Church Street)	US 278 overlap
2.699	4.344	US 63 / AR 189 south (Smith Road) – Pine Bluff, Monticello	Northern terminus, AR 189 northern terminus
1.000 mi = 1.609 km; 1.000 km = 0.621 mi

=== Bono business route ===
U.S. Highway 63B
- Location: Bono, Arkansas
- Length: 2.735 mi (4.402 km)
- Existed: May 29, 2014–present

U.S. Route 63 Business (US 63B and Hwy. 63B) is a business route of 2.735 miles (4.402 km) in Craighead County, Arkansas.

US 63B begins at US 63 at the southern edge of the small town of Bono in the Arkansas Delta. The roadway continues northwesterly, paralleling the BNSF Railway tracks through a commercial part of town. US 63B serves as the eastern terminus of Highway 230 (Church Street) near the center of town before continuing northwest to terminate at the parent route.

US 63B was created in Bono along a former alignment of US 63 following construction of a new bypass to the west of town. The Arkansas State Highway Commission created the designation on November 17, 2004, and the designation was approved by the American Association of State Highway and Transportation Officials (AASHTO) on May 29, 2014.

Major intersections

The entire route is in Bono, Craighead County.

mi	km	Destinations	Notes
0.000	0.000	US 63 – Jonesboro, Walnut Ridge	Southern terminus
		AR 230 west (Church Street) / Gillihan Street	AR 230 eastern terminus
2.68	4.31	US 63 – Jonesboro, Walnut Ridge	Northern terminus
1.000 mi = 1.609 km; 1.000 km = 0.621 mi

=== Hoxie business route ===
U.S. Highway 63B
- Location: Hoxie, Arkansas
- Length: 4.26 mi (6.86 km)
- Existed: May 13, 1998–present

U.S. Highway 63 Business (US 63B and Hwy. 63B) is a business route of 4.26 miles (6.86 km) in Lawrence County, Arkansas.

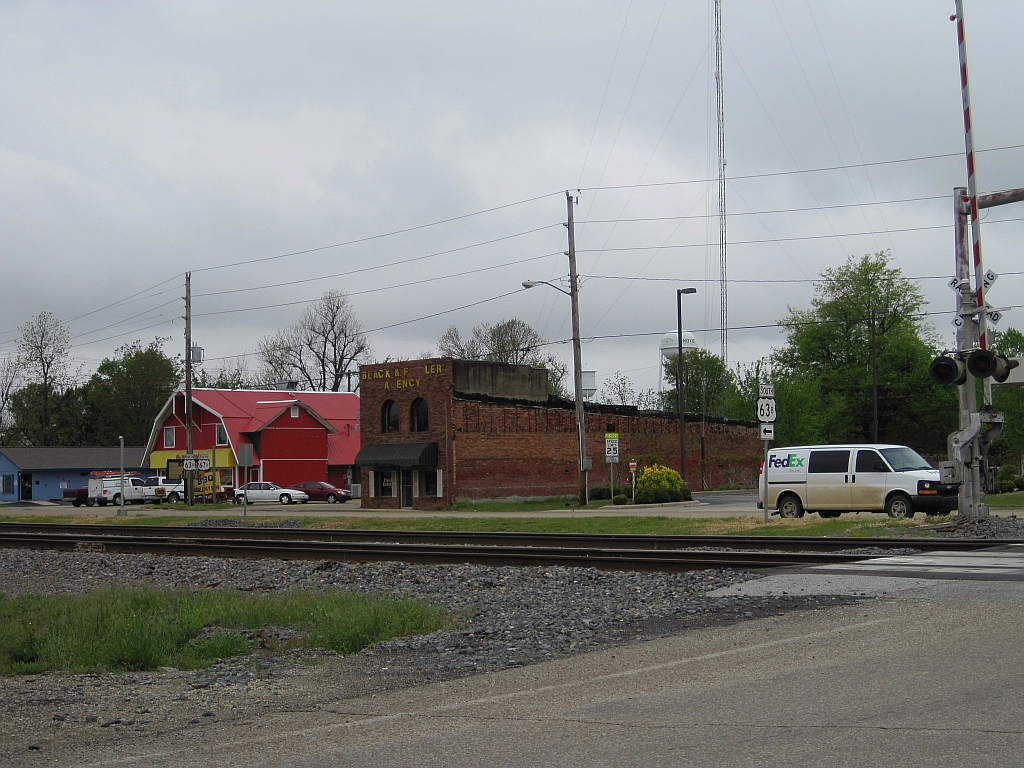
US 63B turns onto AR 367 along Texas Street in Hoxie

US 63B begins at US 63 in Walnut Ridge, a small city on Crowley's Ridge in Northeast Arkansas. The two-lane road runs northwest, paralleling the BNSF Railway tracks and crossing under a freeway segment of US 67 and US 412 (with no connection) before entering Hoxie as Lindsey Street. After passing through a residential section, US 63B crosses the Union Pacific Railroad tracks before intersecting AR 367; the two routes form a concurrency southbound as Texas Street for four blocks. The concurrency ends at Hartigan Road (a one-way pair), US 63B turns northwest and passes Hoxie High School and the Hoxie School District administration offices. The route curves to again parallel the BNSF railroad tracks before a junction with US 63 and US 412, where it terminates.

The Arkansas State Highway Commission created the US 63B designation in Hoxie on May 13, 1998. The designation was established following completion of a bypass around the town, with US 63 rerouted onto the bypass and US 63B created along former US 63 through downtown.

Major intersections

Mileage reflects northbound travel. The entire route is in Lawrence County.

Location	mi	km	Destinations	Notes
Walnut Ridge	0.000	0.000	US 63 – Jonesboro	Southern terminus
Hoxie	2.087– 2.33	3.359– 3.75	AR 367 (Texas Street)	Former US 67
	4.26	6.86	US 63 / US 412 – Jonesboro, Imboden	Northern terminus
1.000 mi = 1.609 km; 1.000 km = 0.621 mi

=== Hardy business route ===
Main Street
- Location: Hardy, Arkansas
- Length: 1.517 mi (2.441 km)
- Existed: November 20, 2014–present

U.S. Highway 63 Business (US 63B, Hwy. 63B, and Main Street) is a business route in Hardy, Arkansas.

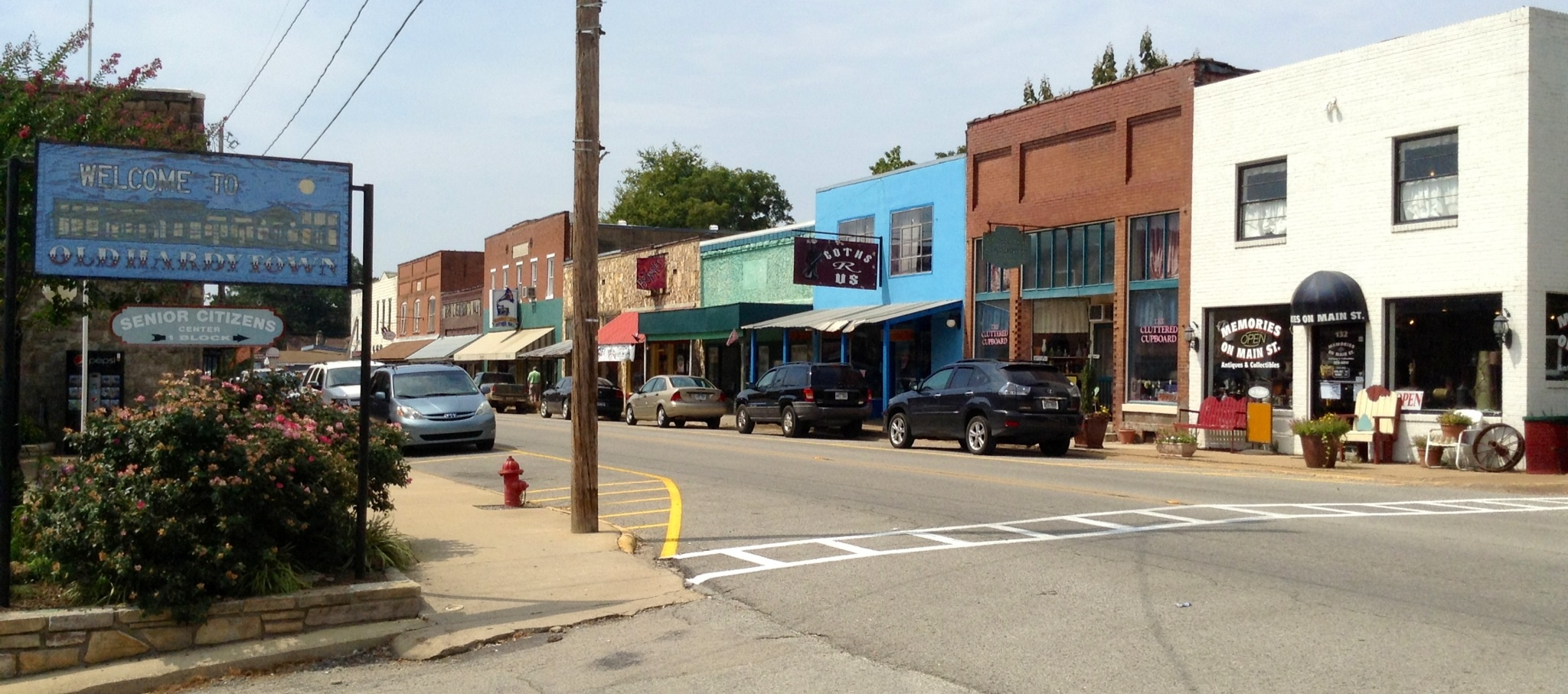
US 63B (Main Street) serves the Hardy Downtown Historic District

US 63B begins near the western city limits of Hardy at US 63 and runs east toward the Spring River as Main Street concurrently with US 62/US 412. Shortly after beginning, US 63B has a junction ending the US 62/US 412 concurrency; US 63B continues eastbound alone into the Hardy Downtown Historic District. The highway intersects Spring Street (former AR 175) and parallels the BNSF Railroad and Spring River, passing through downtown Hardy and the historic Lee Weaver House. East of downtown, US 63B passes a historic residential section of homes with notable vernacular architecture, including the Sherman Bates House, Sherman and Merlene Bates House, Carrie Tucker House, Fred Graham House, and the Web Long House and Motel before intersecting US 62/US 63/US 412, where it terminates.

The Arkansas State Highway Commission created the designation in 2006 along US 63 through downtown Hardy following construction of a bypass of the town, with the US 63 designation moving onto the new terrain route. The change was approved by the American Association of State Highway and Transportation Officials on November 20, 2014.

Major intersections

The entire route is in Hardy, Sharp County.

mi	km	Destinations	Notes
0.000	0.000	US 62 east / US 63 / US 412 east – Imboden, Hoxie, Mammoth Spring, Thayer, MO	West end of US 62/412 overlap, southern terminus
0.28	0.45	US 62 west / US 412 west to US 167 – Ash Flat, Little Rock, Batesville, Mountain Home	East end of US 62/412 overlap
0.63	1.01	Spring Street	Former AR 175
1.517	2.441	US 62 / US 63 / US 412 – Mammoth Spring, Ash Flat	Northern terminus
1.000 mi = 1.609 km; 1.000 km = 0.621 mi: Concurrency terminus

== Missouri ==
=== Thayer business route ===
U.S. Route 63 Business
- Location: Thayer, Missouri
- Length: 2.14 mi (3.44 km)

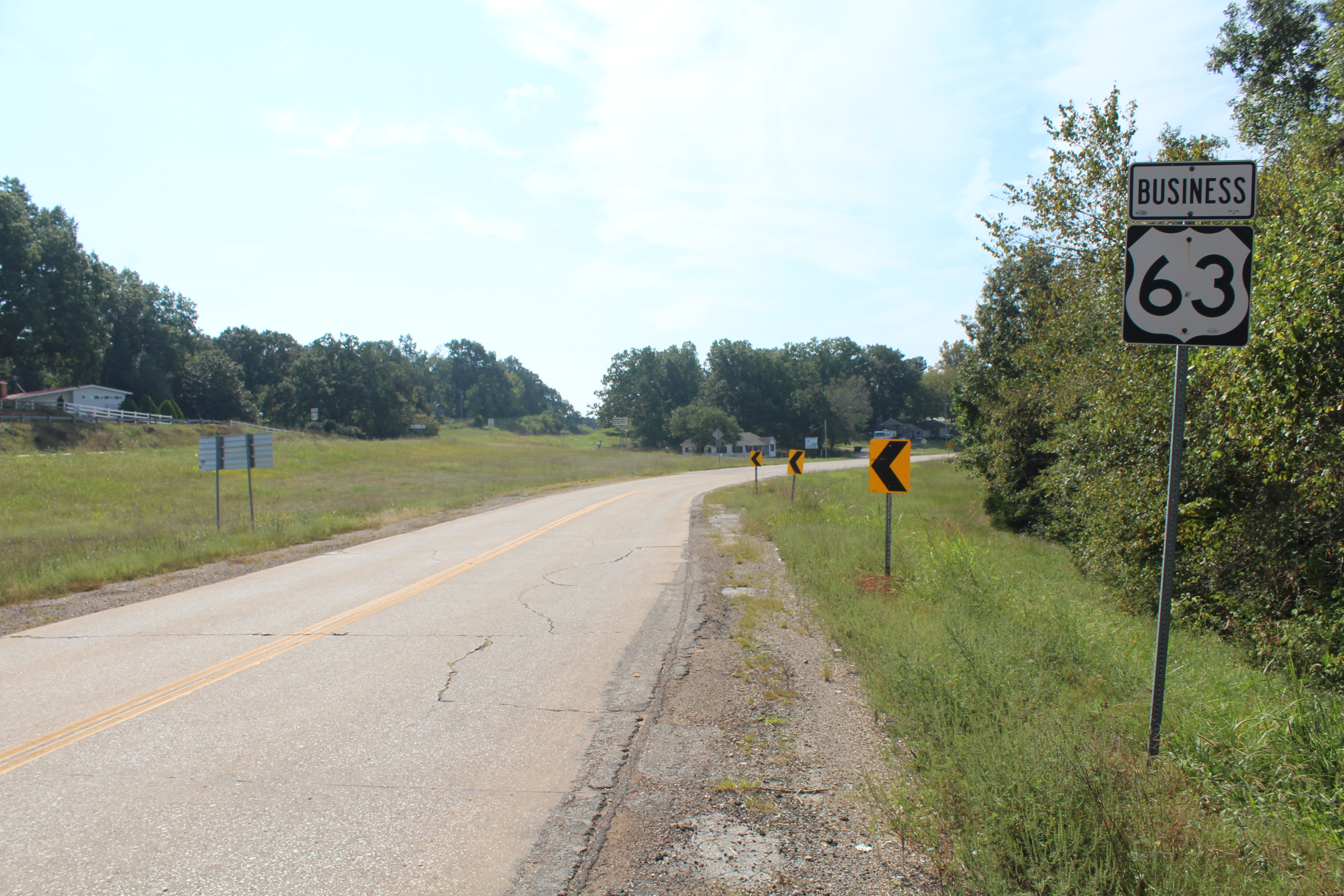
Business 63 southbound from its northern terminus with US 63 and Missouri route 19

U.S. Highway 63 Business is a business route in Thayer, Missouri. the route begins on a concurrency with Missouri Route 142 after about half a mile route 142 leaves the concurrency, then business 63 continues along the west side of Thayer. North of Thayer the route terminates at US 63 and the southern terminus of Missouri Route 19

=== West Plains business route ===
U.S. Route 63 Business
- Location: West Plains, Missouri
- Length: 4.416 mi (7.107 km)

U.S. Highway 63 Business is a business route in West Plains, Missouri. It starts about 0.75 miles (1.21 km) north of Missouri Supplemental Highway ZZ, and locally is known as Bill Virdon Blvd. As the road starts to turn to the west around Grace Ave., the road changes names to East Main St., passing by Ozark Action. About 0.25 miles (0.40 km) west of Ozark Action at Howell Ave., East Main St. turns off at Howell Ave., and the road is named Jackie Garrett Dr., after a local service station owner for many years. The station is at the corner of Porter Wagoner Blvd. and Broadway. Crossing Washington Ave near Court Square, the road changes names again to Broadway. After running as Broadway for about 1 mile (1.6 km), the road turns toward the north again at Porter Wagoner Blvd., where the Garrett service station stands, and remains that name until it meets back with US 63 near the Wayhaven area of West Plains.

=== Willow Springs business route ===
U.S. Route 63 Business
- Location: Willow Springs, Missouri
- Length: 4.400 mi (7.081 km)

U.S. Highway 63 Business is a business route in Willow Springs, Missouri, and coincides with Business US 60.

=== Columbia connector route ===
U.S. Route 63 Connector
- Location: Columbia, Missouri
- Length: 1.251 mi (2.013 km)

A connector highway exists in Columbia, Missouri. This route begins/ends at US 63 and intersects Interstate 70 and Interstate 70 Business.

=== Moberly business route ===
U.S. Route 63 Business
- Location: Moberly, Missouri
- Length: 9.593 mi (15.438 km)

U.S. Highway 63 Business is a business route in Moberly, Missouri.

=== Kirksville business route ===
U.S. Route 63 Business
- Location: Kirksville, Missouri
- Length: 7.637 mi (12.291 km)

U.S. Highway 63 Business is a business route in Kirksville, Missouri.

== Iowa ==
=== Ottumwa business route ===
U.S. Highway 63 Business
- Location: Ottumwa, Iowa
- Length: 6.426 mi (10.342 km)

U.S. Highway 63 Business is a business route in Ottumwa, Iowa.

Major intersections

The entire route is in Wapello County.

Location	mi	km	Destinations	Notes
Ottumwa	0.000	0.000	US 34 east / US 63 – Bloomfield, Burlington	Roundabout; southern end of US 34 overlap
Ottumwa	0.967– 0.593	1.556– 0.954	Vine Street, Jefferson Street (US 34 Bus.) – Amtrak station	
Ottumwa	1.473	2.371	US 34 west (Albia Road) / Iowa 149 begins (Wapello Street)	Northern end of US 34 overlap; southern end of Iowa 149 overlap
Richland–Highland township line	6.426	10.342	US 63 / Iowa 149 north – Hedrick, Oskaloosa, Bloomfield	Northern end of Iowa 149 overlap
1.000 mi = 1.609 km; 1.000 km = 0.621 mi: Concurrency terminus

=== New Hampton business route ===
U.S. Highway 63 Business
- Location: New Hampton, Iowa
- Length: 4.5 mi (7.2 km)

U.S. Highway 63 Business is a business route in New Hampton, Iowa.

== Former ==
=== Pine Bluff business route ===
U.S. Highway 63B
- Location: Pine Bluff, Arkansas
- Length: 7.30 mi (11.75 km)
- Existed: October 2, 1999–November 2020

U.S. Route 63 Business (US 63B and Hwy. 63B) is a former 7.30-mile (11.75 km) business route of US 63 in Pine Bluff, Arkansas.

The route began at Exit 43 on I-530/US 79; where US 63 joins the freeway eastbound and the northbound Olive Street continuing as US 63B. Olive Street runs north, bridging Bayou Bartholomew and entering a residential section of the city. It passed the historic McDonald's Store#433 Sign, as well as the Puddephatt House and Howson House before turning onto Harding Avenue and then to Main Street. It turned onto 8th Street, entering the Pine Bluff Commercial Historic District and passing the George Howard Jr. Federal Building and United States Courthouse, Arts and Science Center for Southeast Arkansas, the Pine Bluff Civic Center, and the Pine Bluff Convention Center. US 63B next turned onto Convention Center Drive and briefly overlapping Highway 190 (5th Avenue/6th Avenue, a one-way pair) and crossing the Union Pacific Railway tracks before turning onto US 65B (Martha Mitchell Expressway) eastbound. US 63B followed US 65B until an intersection with US 63/US 79, where US 63B terminated

The route was created by renumbering Highway 15 Business (AR 15B) when US 63 supplanted AR 15 as part of an extension south from West Memphis to Ruston, Louisiana; approved by AASHTO on October 2, 1999. The designation was deleted in November 2020; with the segment along Olive Street between I-530 and Harding Street becoming a new segment of Highway 463.

Major intersections

The entire route was in Pine Bluff, Jefferson County.

mi	km	Destinations	Notes
0.00	0.00	US 63 / US 79 / US 65B / AR 15 – Altheimer, Stuttgart	Northern terminus, begin US 65B concurrency
2.59	4.17	US 65B west (Martha Mitchell Expressway)	End US 65B concurrency
2.96– 3.18	4.76– 5.12	AR 190 (5th Avenue / 6th Avenue)	Officially designated exception
7.30	11.75	I-530 / US 63 / US 79 – Warren, Little Rock, Lake Village	Southern terminus
1.000 mi = 1.609 km; 1.000 km = 0.621 mi

=== Hazen spur ===
U.S. Highway 63S
- Location: Hazen, Arkansas
- Length: 0.8 mi (1,300 m)
- Existed: October 2, 1999–February 6, 2008

U.S. Route 63 Spur (US 63S and Hwy. 63S) is a former spur route of 0.8 miles (1.3 km) in Hazen, Arkansas.

US 63S began at US 63 in Hazen, a small town on the Arkansas Grand Prairie. The route ran west as North Front Street through a residential area, paralleling the former Chicago, Rock Island and Pacific Railroad tracks, since converted to the Hazen Trail and the Railroad Prairie Natural Area. US 63B continued west past the historic Rock Island Depot before turning left onto Livermore Street and terminating at US 70 (South Front Street) in downtown Hazen.

The roadway was previously part of Highway 11 (AR 11), and was later redesignated Highway 11 Spur. The US 63B designation replaced AR 11S when US 63 supplanted AR 11 as part of an extension south from West Memphis to Ruston, Louisiana; approved by AASHTO on October 2, 1999. On February 6, 2008, the Arkansas State Highway Commission relinquished control of the roadway to local maintenance.

Major intersections

The entire route was in Hazen, Prairie County.

mi	km	Destinations	Notes
0.00	0.00	US 63 – Des Arc, Stuttgart	Eastern terminus
0.8	1.3	US 70 (South Front Street) – Lonoke, DeValls Bluff	Western terminus
1.000 mi = 1.609 km; 1.000 km = 0.621 mi

=== Marked Tree business route ===
U.S. Highway 63B
- Location: Marked Tree, Arkansas
- Length: 2.4 mi (3.9 km)
- Existed: November 6, 1970–May 20, 2019

U.S. Highway 63 Business (US 63B and Hwy. 63B) is a former business route of 2.4 miles (3.9 km) in Marked Tree, Poinsett County, Arkansas.

US 63B began at an exit along I-555/US 63 and the northern terminus of AR 149 in Marked Tree, a small town in the Arkansas Delta. It ran northeast as 10th Street to turn onto Frisco Street, with the roadway continuing straight as AR 308 toward the Marked Tree Municipal Airport. Now paralleling the BNSF Railway tracks, the route passed through the Marked Tree Commercial Historic District, the historic commercial center of the city, before an intersection with Gayosa Street. US 63B turned left onto Gayosa Street, beginning an concurrency with AR 14, with AR 140 beginning eastward from this junction. US 63B/AR 14 continued southwest together over the St. Francis River to I-555/US 63, where US 63B terminated.

Mainline US 63 was rerouted onto the bypass with US 63B designated along the former alignment through downtown Marked Tree. It was deleted on May 20, 2019 when US 63 was rerouted to overlap US 49 between Brinkley and Jonesboro, thus removing US 63 from Interstate 555 (I-555), which it had overlapped between West Memphis and Jonesboro.

Major intersections

This table reflects the highway's junctions upon decommissioning. The entire route was in Marked Tree, Poinsett County.

mi	km	Destinations	Notes
0.0	0.0	I-555 / US 63 / AR 149 south – Memphis, Jonesboro, Earle	Southern terminus, AR 149 northern terminus
0.6	0.97	AR 308 east	AR 308 western terminus
1.6	2.6	AR 140 north / AR 14 east (Gayosa) – Jonesboro, Lepanto, Osceola	north end of AR 14 overlap
2.4	3.9	I-555 / US 63 / AR 14 west / AR 75 south – Memphis, Jonesboro, Parkin	Northern terminus, south end of AR 14 overlap, AR 75 northern terminus
1.000 mi = 1.609 km; 1.000 km = 0.621 mi: Concurrency terminus

=== Trumann city route ===
U.S. Highway 63C
- Location: Trumann, Arkansas
- Length: 1.7 mi (2.7 km)
- Existed: March 4, 1959–October 28, 1970

U.S. Route 63 City (US 63C and Hwy. 63C) is a former city route of 1.7 miles (2.7 km) in Trumann, Arkansas.

The US 63C designation began at US 63 (now AR 463 in Trumann, a small town in Northeast Arkansas. It ran northeast along Melton Avenue before curving northwest and paralleling the St. Louis–San Francisco Railway (Frisco) railroad tracks. The highway designation turned onto Oak Street through a residential area before turning onto Pine Street for one block, then onto Speedway Street to again parallel the Frisco railroad before terminating at an intersection with US 63. The roadway continued west as AR 69.

The Arkansas General Assembly passed the Act 148 of 1957, the Milum Road Act, creating 10–12 miles (16–19 km) of new state highways in each county. The City of Trumann requested the Arkansas State Highway Commission add this segment to the state highway system as a city truck route, however adding routes within municipalities was not permitted initially. Following a change in policy, Trumann again requested the route's addition, which was granted on March 4, 1959. US 63C was deleted on October 28, 1970, with the segment between US 63 (now AR 463) and Pine Avenue becoming an extension of AR 69 and the remainder becoming a city street.

Major intersections

The entire route was in Trumann, Poinsett County.

mi	km	Destinations	Notes
0.0	0.0	US 63	Southern terminus
1.7	2.7	US 63 / AR 69 south (Speedway Street)	Northern terminus, AR 69 northern terminus
1.000 mi = 1.609 km; 1.000 km = 0.621 mi

=== Jonesboro business route ===
U.S. Highway 63B
- Location: Jonesboro, Arkansas
- Length: 10.3 mi (16.6 km)
- Existed: November 8, 1961–November 20, 2014

U.S. Highway 63 Business (U.S. 63B, formerly U.S. Highway 63 City [U.S. 63C]) was a 10.3-mile (16.6 km) business route of U.S. Route 63 in Craighead County. The route ran through downtown Jonesboro until being redesignated Arkansas Highway 91 on October 27, 2006.

US 63 BUS ran northwest from US 63 to meet AR 18. US 63 BUS/AR 18 became Highland Drive east across US 49/AR 1 and north with AR 141 (former US 49 BUS). The route ran west as Dan Ave. to terminate at US 63.

In 1961, the Arkansas Highway Department collaborated with the city planning division of Arkansas State University, the City of Jonesboro, and Craighead County to develop transportation plans for the area. The top priority in the plan was the "Johnson Street Connection", which connected Main Street (AR 1) and US 63 along Johnson Avenue, Floyd Street, and Dan Avenue. On November 8, 1961, the Arkansas State Highway Commission designated the Johnson Avenue Extension as U.S. 63 City Route (US 63C). Following construction of a bypass around downtown Jonesboro; US 63 was rerouted onto the new bypass; with US 63C and former alignments of US 63 becoming part of a newly designated US 63B, including concurrencies with AR 1 (Main Street) and AR 18 (Highland Avenue). The changes were made by the Arkansas State Highway Commission on May 27, 1970 and were officially confirmed by the United States Route Number Committee of the American Association of State Highway and Transportation Officials (AASHTO) later in the year.

== See also ==
- List of special routes of the United States Numbered Highway System
