= Locke House =

Locke House may refer to:

in the United States (by state then city)

- Esther Locke House, Hardy, Arkansas, listed on the National Register of Historic Places (NRHP) in Sharp County
- Locke-Nall House, Lockesburg, Arkansas, listed on the NRHP in Sevier County
- Locke House and Barn, Lockeford, California, listed on the NRHP in San Joaquin County
- Locke House (Oakland, California), listed on the National Register of Historic Places in Alameda County
- Locke-Mount House, Goshen, Kentucky, listed on the NRHP in Oldham County
- Capt. Benjamin Locke House, Arlington, Massachusetts, listed on the NRHP
- Charles Adams-Woodbury Locke House, Somerville, Massachusetts, listed on the NRHP in Middlesex County
- Locke-Baldwin-Kinsley House, Stoneham, Massachusetts, listed on the NRHP
- Asa Locke House, Winchester, Massachusetts, listed on the NRHP
- Capt. Josiah Locke House, Winchester, Massachusetts, listed on the NRHP
- Philemon Wright/Asa Locke Farm, Winchester, Massachusetts, listed on the NRHP
- Elijah Locke House, Rye, New Hampshire, listed on the NRHP in Rockingham County
- Hadley-Locke House, Corvallis, Oregon, listed on the NRHP in Benton County
- Locke House (Decatur, Tennessee), formerly listed on the National Register of Historic Places in Meigs County
