= William Shaver House =

Historic house in Arkansas, United States

- U.S. National Register of Historic Places
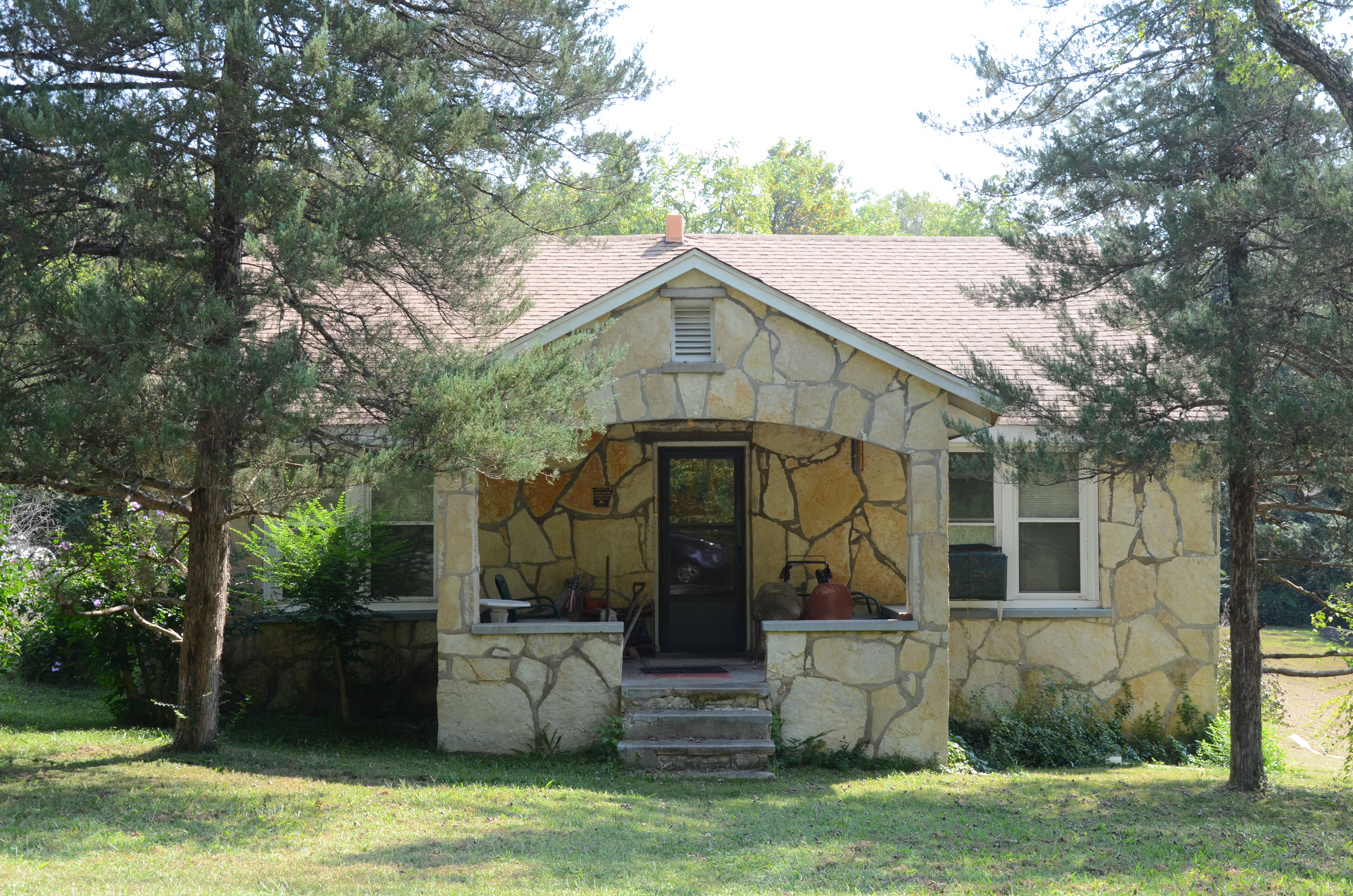

- Location within Arkansas Location within the United States
- Location: School Ave., N of jct. with 4th St., Hardy, Arkansas
- Coordinates: 36°19′8″N 91°29′0″W
- Area: 1 acre (0.40 ha)
- Built: 1947
- Architect: Johnson, Roy Lee
- Architectural style: Bungalow/craftsman
- MPS: Hardy, Arkansas MPS
- NRHP reference No.: 98001511
- Added to NRHP: December 17, 1998

The William Shaver House is a historic house on the east side of School Street, north of 4th Street, in Hardy, Arkansas. It is a single story fieldstone structure, with a side gable roof and a projecting gable-roofed porch. The porch is supported by stone columns with an elliptical arch, and a concrete base supporting a low stone wall. The main facade is three bays wide, with the porch and entrance at the center, and flanking sash windows. The house is a fine local example of a vernacular stone house, built c. 1947 for a working-class family.

The house was listed on the National Register of Historic Places in 1998.

== See also ==
- Fred Carter House, a nearby house built by the same builder around the same time
- National Register of Historic Places listings in Sharp County, Arkansas
