= Sam Davidson House =

Historic house in Arkansas, United States

- U.S. National Register of Historic Places
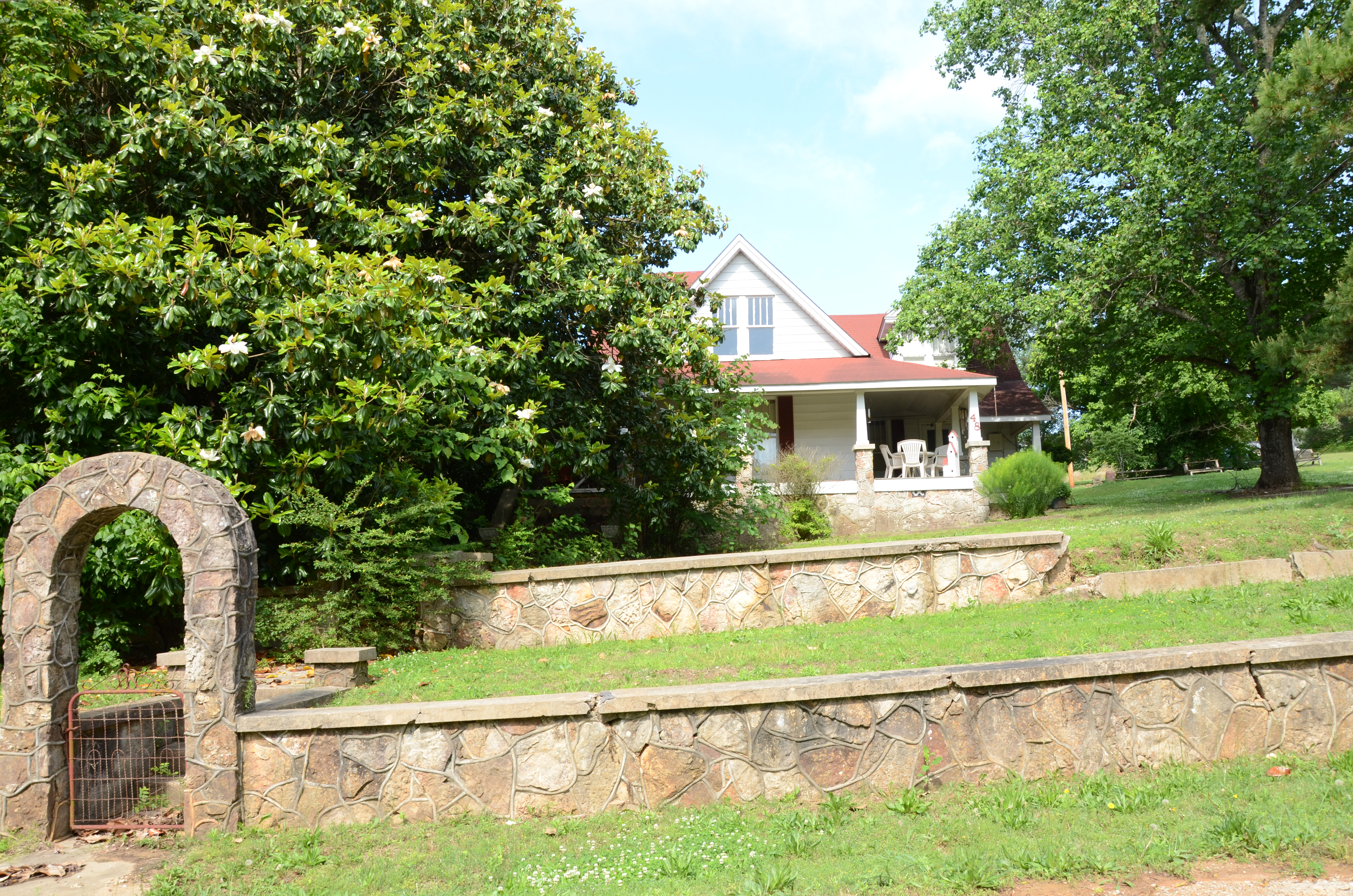

- Location within Arkansas Location within the United States
- Location: Cammack St., Evening Shade, Arkansas
- Coordinates: 36°4′23″N 91°37′11″W
- Area: less than one acre
- Built: 1880
- MPS: Evening Shade MRA
- NRHP reference No.: 82002135
- Added to NRHP: June 2, 1982

The Sam Davison House is a historic house on Cammack Street in Evening Shade, Arkansas. Set on a corner lot behind sandstone retaining walls, it is a 1 1/2-story wood-frame structure with an ell extending to the north. Built c. 1880 by a prominent local lawyer, the house is one of a modest number of 19th century houses in the community, and is architecturally distinctive for its 1920s era porch, which wraps around three sides and features Craftsman style exposed rafter tails.

The house was listed on the National Register of Historic Places in 1982.

== See also ==
- National Register of Historic Places listings in Sharp County, Arkansas
