= David L. King House =

Historic house in Arkansas, United States

- U.S. National Register of Historic Places
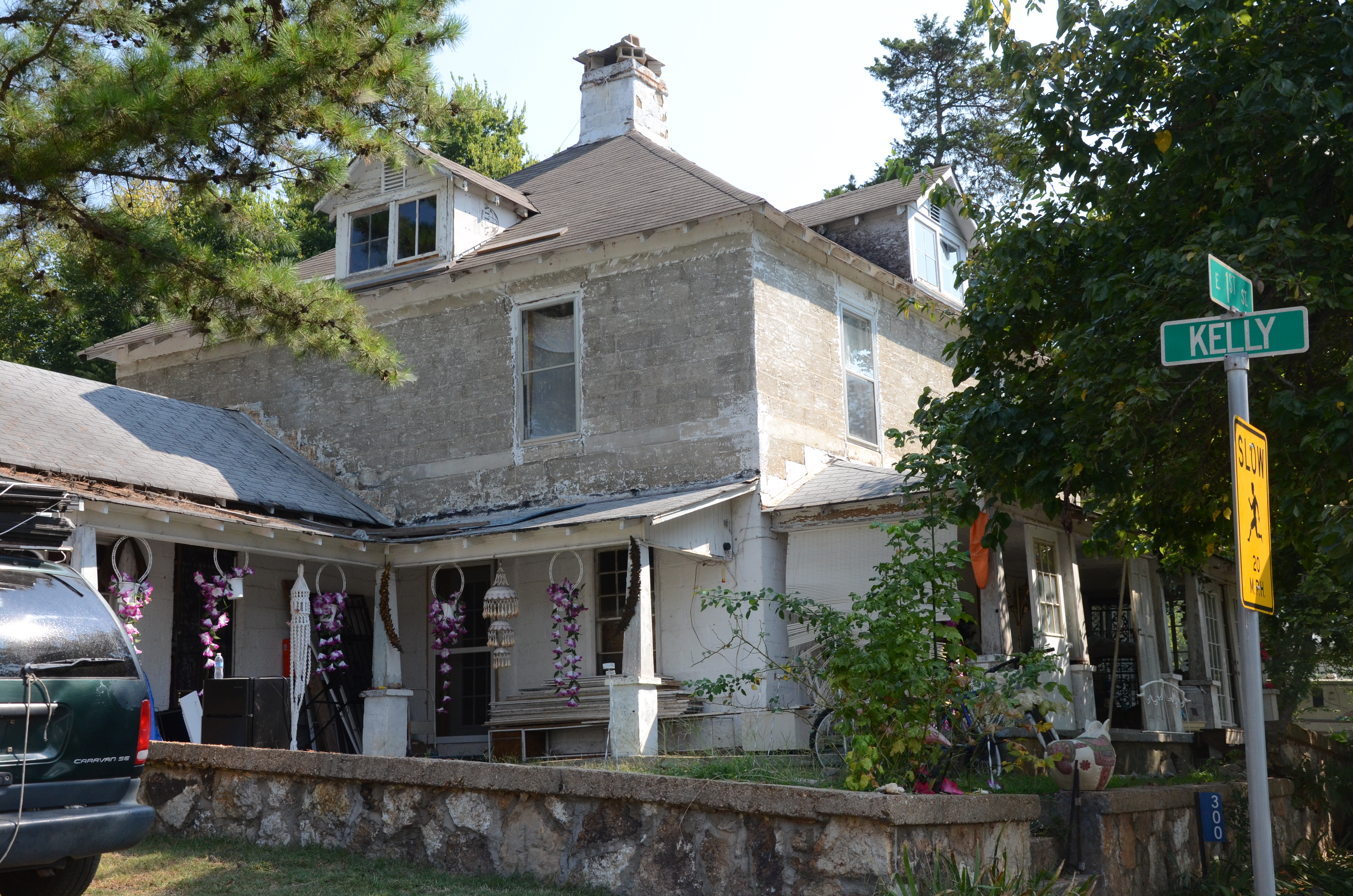

- Location within Arkansas Location within the United States
- Location: 2nd and Kelly St., Hardy, Arkansas
- Coordinates: 36°18′58″N 91°28′46″W
- Area: less than one acre
- Built: 1919
- Architectural style: American Foursquare
- MPS: Hardy, Arkansas MPS
- NRHP reference No.: 02001076
- Added to NRHP: October 4, 2002

The David L. King is a historic house at 2nd and Kelly Street in Hardy, Arkansas. It is a two-story American Foursquare structure with a hip roof, and is fashioned from locally manufactured concrete blocks. It has a hip-roofed porch extending across its front. The house was built in 1919 for David L. King, a prominent lawyer in Sharp County, and is distinctive as a rare example of residential concrete block construction in the community.

The house was listed on the National Register of Historic Places in 2002.

== See also ==
- National Register of Historic Places listings in Sharp County, Arkansas
