= Silas Sherrill House =

Historic house in Arkansas, United States

- U.S. National Register of Historic Places
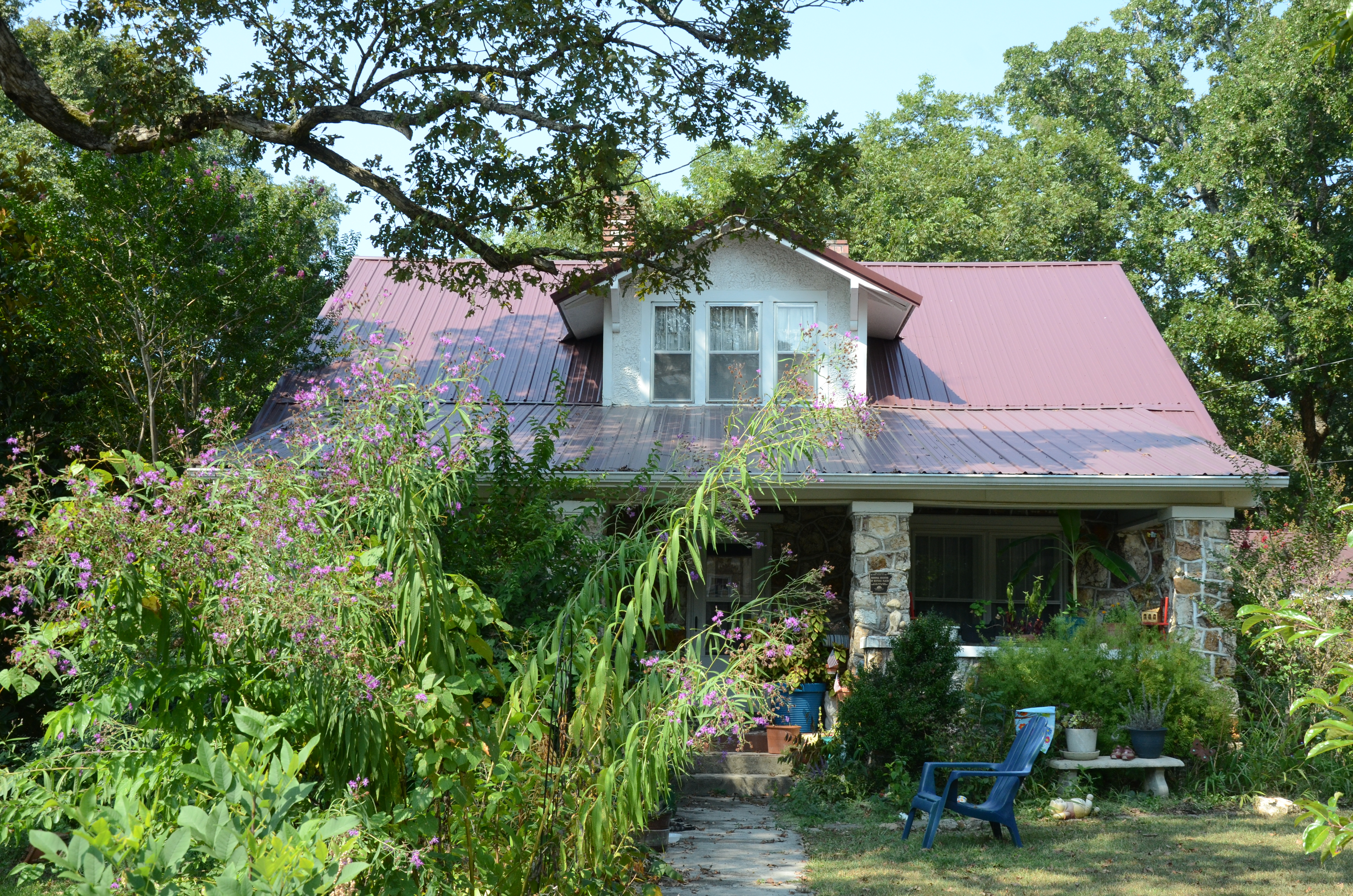

- Location within Arkansas Location within the United States
- Location: Jct. of 4th and Spring Sts., Hardy, Arkansas
- Coordinates: 36°19′5″N 91°28′56″W
- Area: 1.5 acres (0.61 ha)
- Built: 1928
- Architectural style: Bungalow/craftsman
- MPS: Hardy, Arkansas MPS
- NRHP reference No.: 98001514
- Added to NRHP: December 17, 1998

The Silas Sherrill House is a historic house at the southwest corner of 4th and Spring Streets in Hardy, Arkansas. It is a 1 1/2-story structure, fashioned out of rough-cut native stone, uncoursed and finished with beaded mortar. It has a side gable roof with knee brackets in the extended gable ends, and brick chimneys with contrasting colors and gabled caps. A gable-roof dormer pierces the front facade roof, with stuccoed wall finish, exposed rafter tails, and knee brackets. The front has a single-story shed-roof porch extending its full width, supported by piers of conglomerated stone, and with a fieldstone balustrade. Built in 1927–28, it is a fine local example of craftsman architecture executed in stone.

The house was listed on the National Register of Historic Places in 1998.

== See also ==
- National Register of Historic Places listings in Sharp County, Arkansas
