= Woodland Courts =

- U.S. National Register of Historic Places
- U.S. Historic district
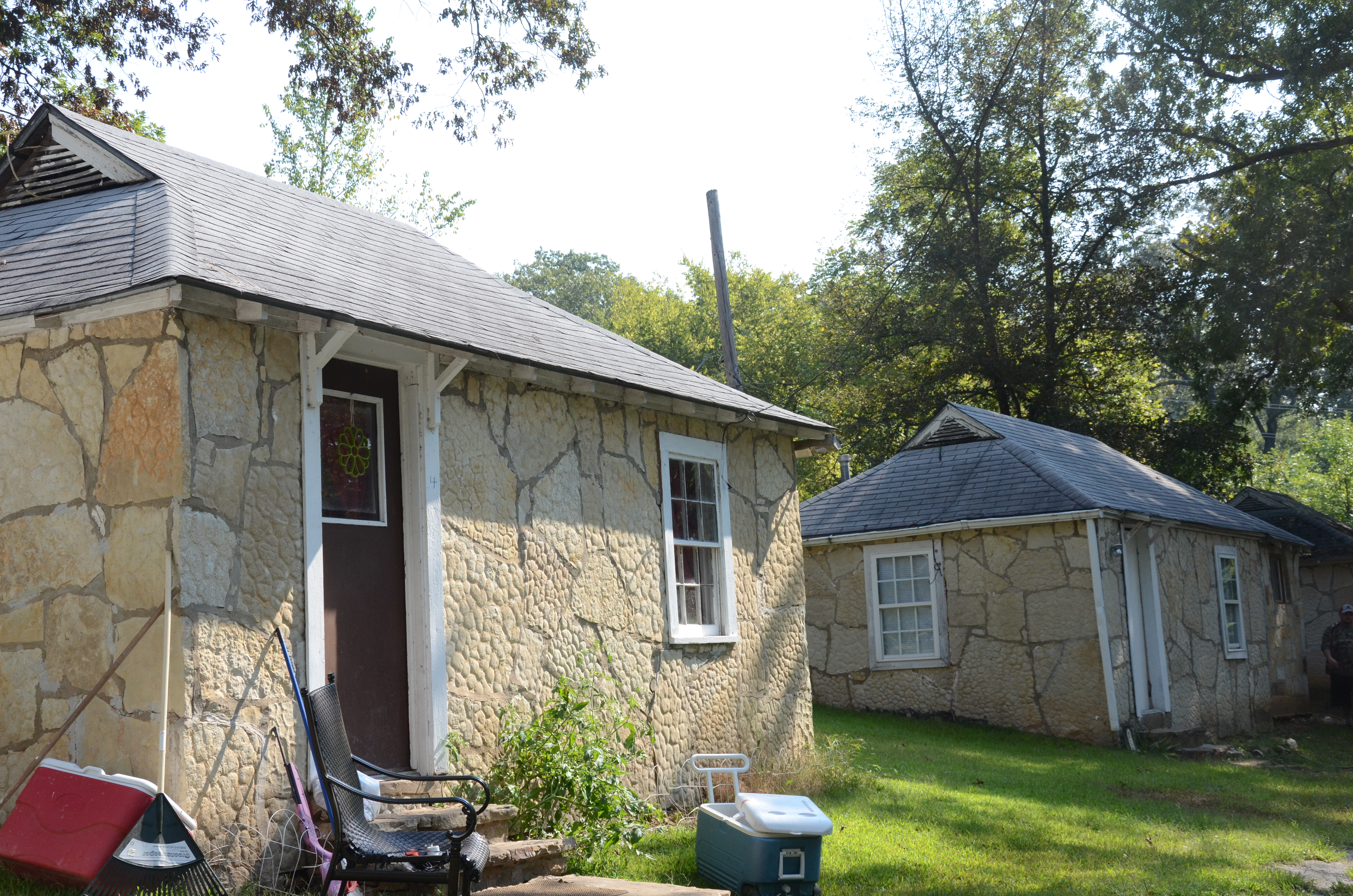

- Location within Arkansas Location within the United States
- Location: NW of jct. of Dawson and Old CC Rds., Hardy, Arkansas
- Coordinates: 36°18′56″N 91°28′26″W
- Area: 1.5 acres (0.61 ha)
- Built: 1938
- Architectural style: Bungalow/craftsman, Plain Traditional
- NRHP reference No.: 92001634
- Added to NRHP: November 27, 1992

Woodland Courts is a collection of tourist cabins in Hardy, Arkansas. They are located along Dawson Street, between Echo Lane and Springwood Street. They are ten vernacular wood-frame structures finished in a fieldstone veneer, with a gable roof. They are generally oriented to face east, regardless of their position with respect to the street. They were built c. 1938, and are the oldest surviving tourist facilities in Hardy, which had become a noted regional tourist area by the early 20th century.

The cabins were listed on the National Register of Historic Places in 1992.

== See also ==
- National Register of Historic Places listings in Sharp County, Arkansas
