= Coger House =

Historic house in Arkansas, United States

- U.S. National Register of Historic Places
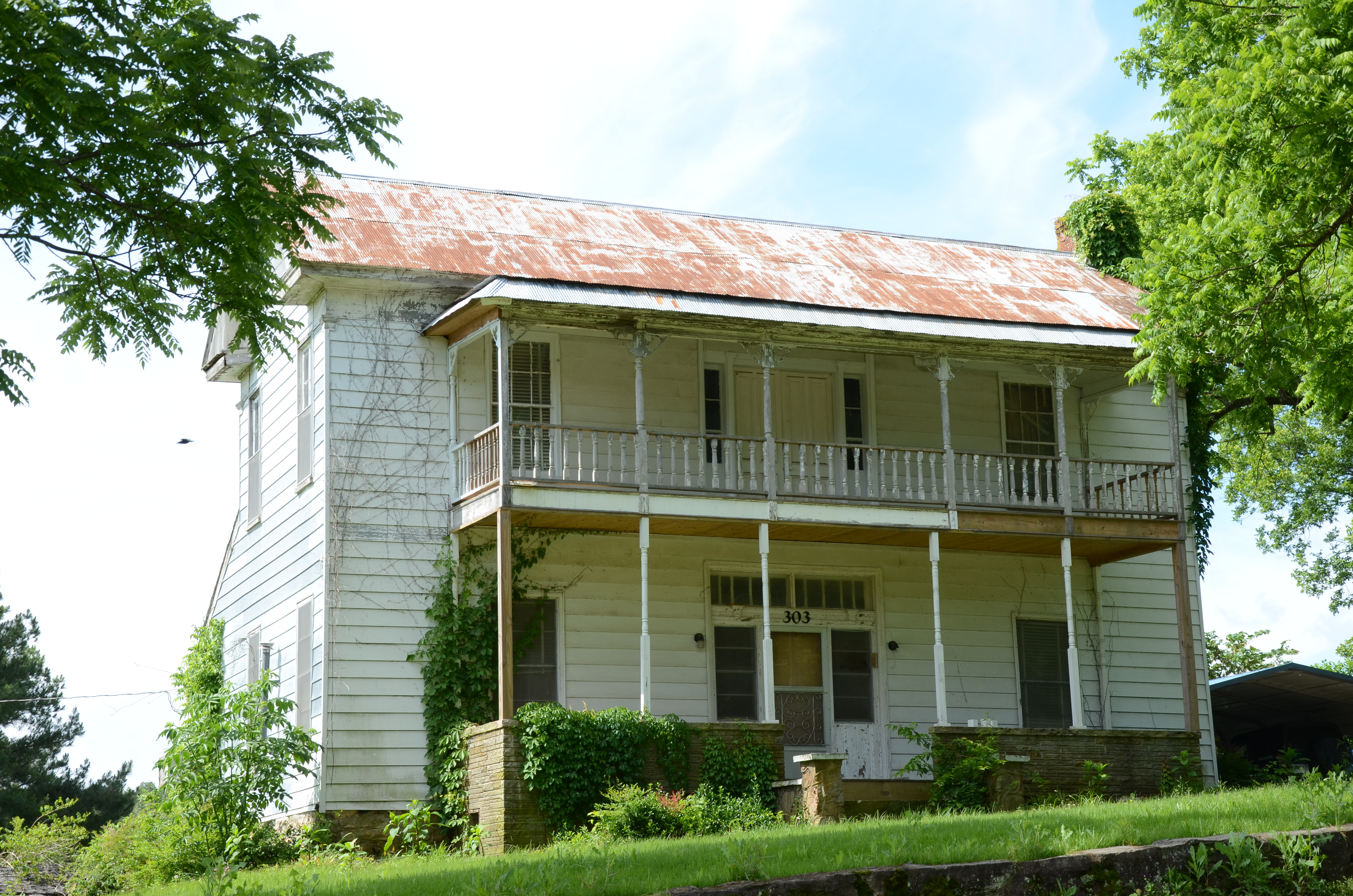

- Location within Arkansas Location within the United States
- Location: Main St., Evening Shade, Arkansas
- Coordinates: 36°4′16″N 91°37′11″W
- Area: less than one acre
- Built: 1870
- MPS: Evening Shade MRA
- NRHP reference No.: 82002134
- Added to NRHP: June 2, 1982

The Coger House is a historic house on Main Street in Evening Shade, Arkansas. It is a two-story wood-frame structure, fronted by a two-story flat-roof porch set on a sandstone foundation. The house was built c. 1870 by Polk Jones, but owned for many years by Claude Coger, owner of the Sharp County Record. Originally a somewhat vernacular Greek Revival in its style, later alterations (including the front porch woodwork) give the house a more Victorian feel.

The house was listed on the National Register of Historic Places in 1982.

== See also ==
- National Register of Historic Places listings in Sharp County, Arkansas
