= Thomas Walker House =

Historic house in Arkansas, United States

- U.S. National Register of Historic Places
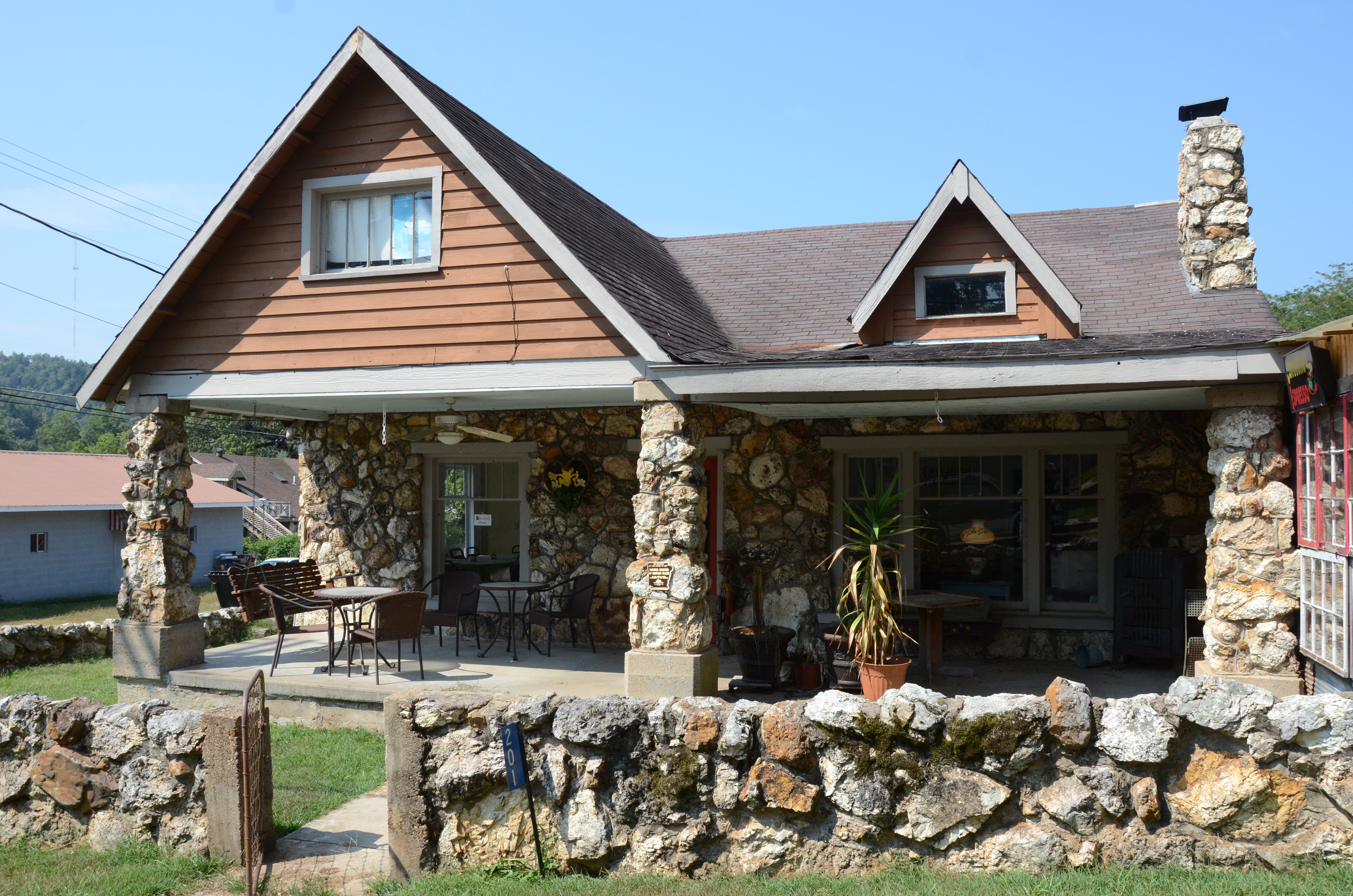

- Location within Arkansas Location within the United States
- Location: 201 N. Spring St., Hardy, Arkansas
- Coordinates: 36°18′52″N 91°28′57″W
- Area: less than one acre
- Built: 1925
- Architectural style: Bungalow/craftsman
- MPS: Hardy, Arkansas MPS
- NRHP reference No.: 04001490
- Added to NRHP: January 20, 2005

The Thomas Walker House is a historic house at 201 North Spring Street in Hardy, Arkansas. Built in 1925, this 1 1/2-story stone structure is a particularly fine local example of Craftsman style. It is fashioned out of rough-cut local fieldstone, and has a prominent front porch supported by tapered square columns, and its low-pitch cross gable roof has exposed rafter ends. The interior retains period flooring, woodwork, and hardware. The house was built for Leonard Brophy, who only lived there a few years before selling it to Thomas Walker.

The house was listed on the National Register of Historic Places in 2005.

== See also ==
- National Register of Historic Places listings in Sharp County, Arkansas
