= Carrie Tucker House =

Historic house in Arkansas, United States

- U.S. National Register of Historic Places
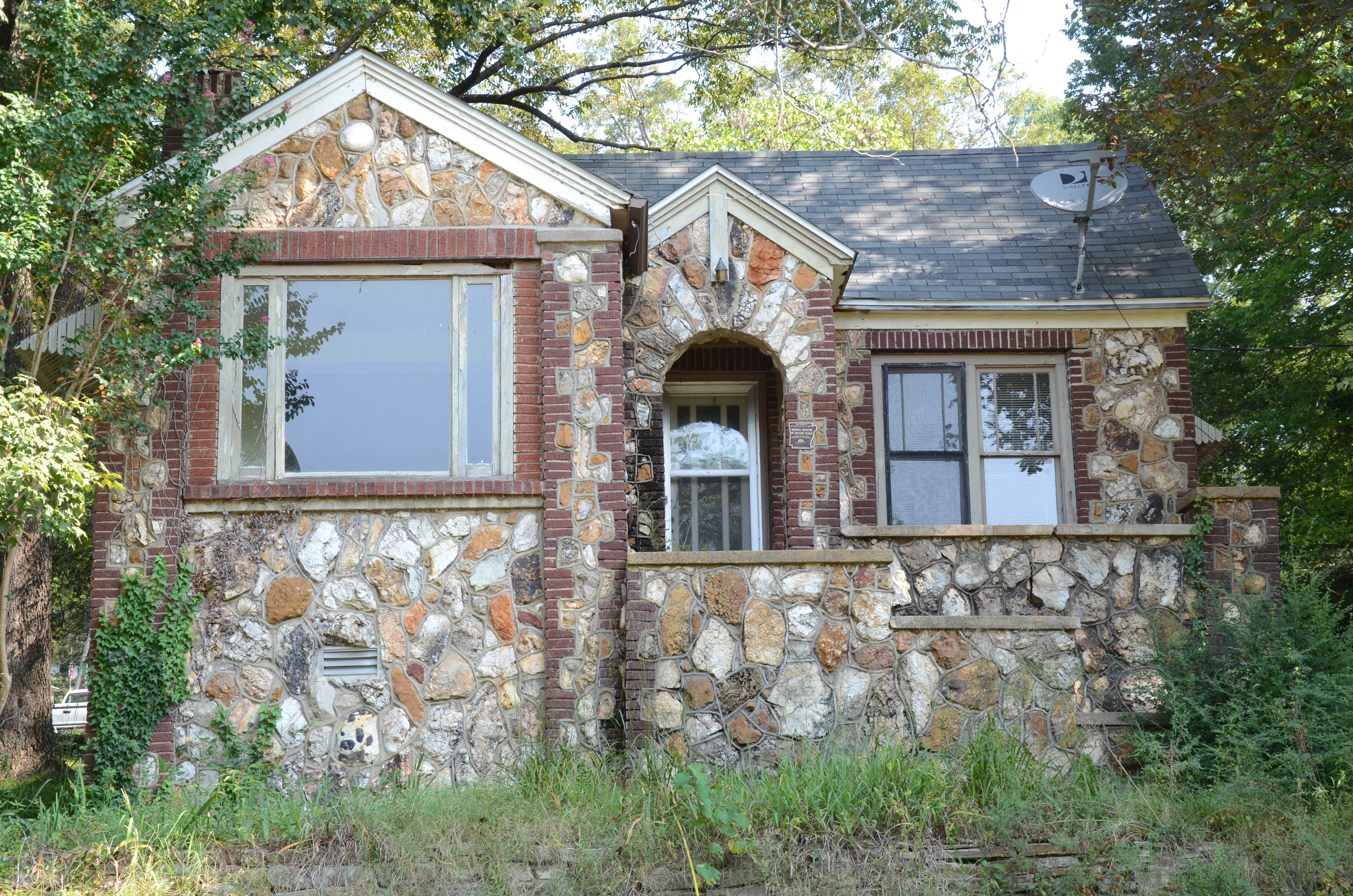

- Location within Arkansas Location within the United States
- Location: 609 Dawson St. - US 62/63, E of jct. with Echo Ln., Hardy, Arkansas 72542
- Coordinates: 36°18′54″N 91°28′28″W
- Area: less than one acre
- Built: 1928
- Built by: Dolph Hall
- Architectural style: Tudor Revival
- MPS: Hardy, Arkansas MPS
- NRHP reference No.: 99000156
- Added to NRHP: February 12, 1999

The Carrie Tucker House is a historic house on the north side of East Main Street (United States Routes 62/63), east of Echo Lane in Hardy, Arkansas. It is a single story structure, with a cross-gable roof, and is fashioned out of native rough-cut stone in a vernacular rendition of Tudor Revival styling. The stone is laid in a random uncoursed manner, and dark-colored brick is used at the corners and as trim around the doors and windows, laid as quoining at the corners. The house was built in the late 1920s by Dolph Lane for Carrie Tucker, and is a well-preserved example of vernacular Tudor Revival styling in the city.

The house was listed on the National Register of Historic Places in 1999.

== See also ==
- Fred Graham House, which is next door to the east
- National Register of Historic Places listings in Sharp County, Arkansas
