= John McCaleb House =

Historic house in Arkansas, United States

- U.S. National Register of Historic Places
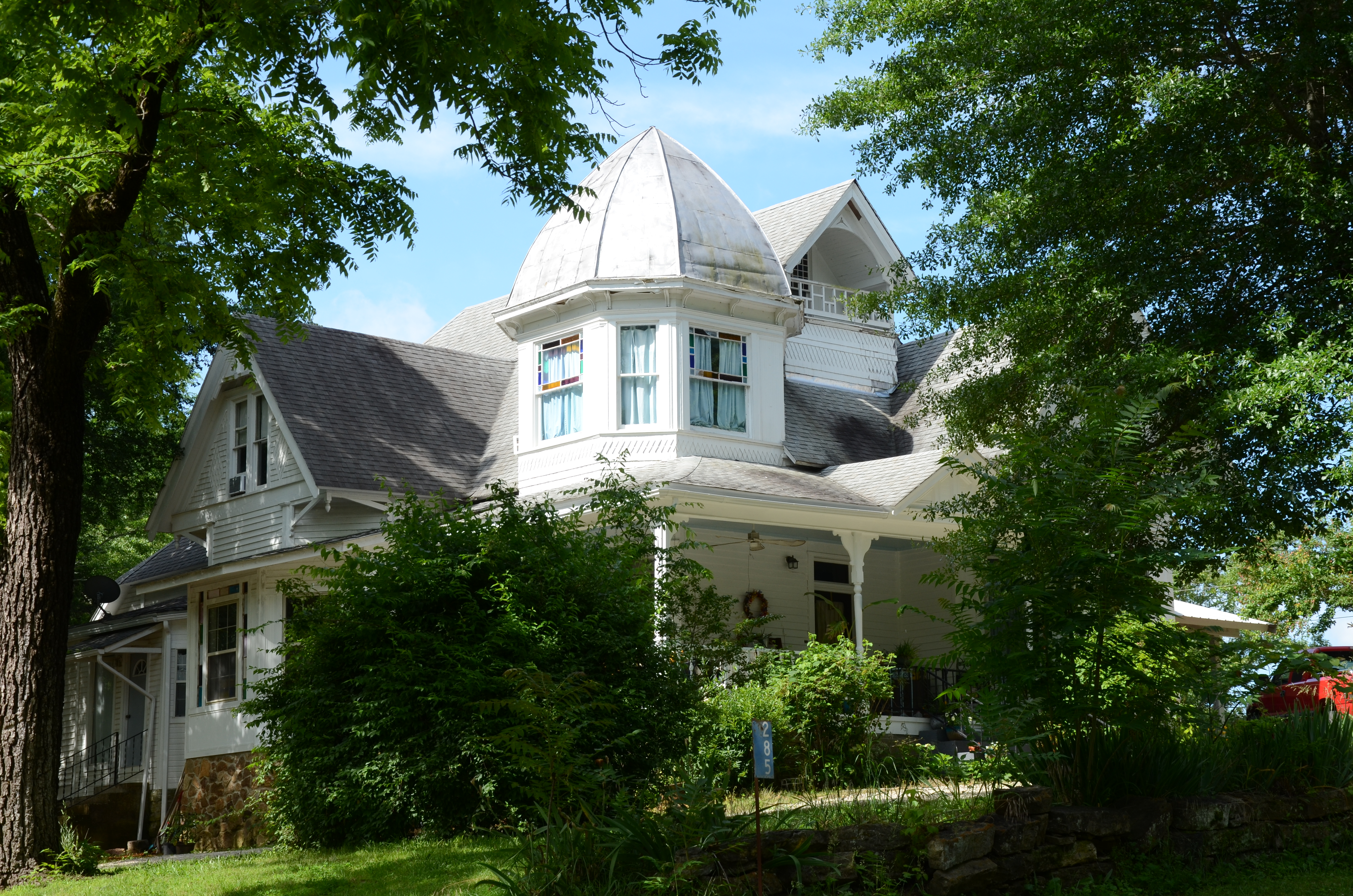

- Location within Arkansas Location within the United States
- Location: Main St., Evening Shade, Arkansas
- Coordinates: 36°4′14″N 91°37′34″W
- Area: less than one acre
- Built: 1900
- MPS: Evening Shade MRA
- NRHP reference No.: 82002137
- Added to NRHP: June 2, 1982

The John McCaleb House is a historic house at Main Street and Sidney Road in Evening Shade, Arkansas. It is a 1 1/2-story wood-frame structure with a gable roof studded with cross gables and dormers. Built c. 1900, it is an outstanding local example of Queen Anne styling, with its complex massing and roofline, projecting gable sections, a recessed attic porch, an octagonal turret, and porch with turned posts and jigsawn brackets. The interior retains significant period decoration, including woodwork and wallpaper.

The house was listed on the National Register of Historic Places in 1982.

== See also ==
- National Register of Historic Places listings in Sharp County, Arkansas
