= Floyd Jackson House =

Historic house in Arkansas, United States

- U.S. National Register of Historic Places
- Location within Arkansas Location within the United States
- Location: Jackson St., Hardy, Arkansas
- Coordinates: 36°18′57″N 91°29′46″W
- Area: less than one acre
- Built: 1929
- Built by: Dolph Hall
- Architectural style: Bungalow/American craftsman
- MPS: Hardy, Arkansas MPS
- NRHP reference No.: 98001516
- Added to NRHP: December 17, 1998

The Floyd Jackson House is a historic house on Jackson Street in Hardy, Arkansas. It is a single story fieldstone structure, built in 1929. Its architecturally distinctive features include a gable roof with extended eaves and exposed rafter tails, with colored wood shingles decorating the gable ends. The interior of the house retains original pine woodwork. It is an example of American craftsman/Bungalow style.

The house was listed on the National Register of Historic Places in 1998.

== See also ==
- National Register of Historic Places listings in Sharp County, Arkansas
