= National Register of Historic Places listings in Sharp County, Arkansas =

Location of Sharp County in Arkansas

This is a list of the National Register of Historic Places listings in Sharp County, Arkansas.

This is intended to be a complete list of the properties and districts on the National Register of Historic Places in Sharp County, Arkansas, United States. The locations of National Register properties and districts for which the latitude and longitude coordinates are included below, may be seen in a map.

There are 28 properties and districts listed on the National Register in the county.

Contents: Counties in Arkansas
- Arkansas
- Ashley
- Baxter
- Benton
- Boone
- Bradley
- Calhoun
- Carroll
- Chicot
- Clark
- Clay
- Cleburne
- Cleveland
- Columbia
- Conway
- Craighead
- Crawford
- Crittenden
- Cross
- Dallas
- Desha
- Drew
- Faulkner
- Franklin
- Fulton
- Garland
- Grant
- Greene
- Hempstead
- Hot Spring
- Howard
- Independence
- Izard
- Jackson
- Jefferson
- Johnson
- Lafayette
- Lawrence
- Lee
- Lincoln
- Little River
- Logan
- Lonoke
- Madison
- Marion
- Miller
- Mississippi
- Monroe
- Montgomery
- Nevada
- Newton
- Ouachita
- Perry
- Phillips
- Pike
- Poinsett
- Polk
- Pope
- Prairie
- Pulaski (Little Rock)
- Randolph
- St. Francis
- Saline
- Scott
- Searcy
- Sebastian
- Sevier
- Sharp
- Stone
- Union
- Van Buren
- Washington
- White
- Woodruff
- Yell

This National Park Service list is complete through NPS recent listings posted October 9, 2026.

== Current listings ==
	Name on the Register	Image	Date listed	Location	City or town	Description
1	Sherman and Merlene Bates House	Sherman and Merlene Bates House	October 4, 2002 (#02001077)	Junction of Dawson and Echo; 36°18′54″N 91°28′30″W	Hardy	
2	Sherman Bates House	Sherman Bates House	December 17, 1998 (#98001515)	Junction of U.S. Route 63 and Echo Ln. 36°18′55″N 91°28′30″W	Hardy	
3	Fred Carter House	Fred Carter House	December 17, 1998 (#98001510)	School Ave., north of its junction with 4th St. 36°19′09″N 91°29′02″W	Hardy	
4	Coger House	Coger House	June 2, 1982 (#82002134)	Main St. 36°04′16″N 91°37′11″W	Evening Shade	
5	Crystal River Tourist Camp	Crystal River Tourist Camp	June 6, 1991 (#91000620)	Junction of U.S. Route 167 and Cave St. 35°56′36″N 91°32′52″W	Cave City	
6	Ernest Daugherty House	Ernest Daugherty House	December 17, 1998 (#98001513)	3rd St., west of its junction with Kelly Ave. 36°18′29″N 91°28′49″W	Hardy	
7	Sam Davidson House	Sam Davidson House	June 2, 1982 (#82002135)	Cammack St. 36°04′23″N 91°37′11″W	Evening Shade	
8	W.A. Edwards House	W.A. Edwards House	June 2, 1982 (#82002136)	Main St. 36°04′16″N 91°37′12″W	Evening Shade	
9	Fred Graham House	Fred Graham House	February 12, 1999 (#99000157)	U.S. Route 62, west of its junction with Springwood Rd. 36°18′53″N 91°28′27″W	Hardy	
10	Hardy Cemetery Historic Section	Hardy Cemetery Historic Section	March 2, 2006 (#06000089)	Bounded by Main St., Kelly St., Cope Ave., and the BNSF railroad line 36°19′02″N 91°28′44″W	Hardy	
11	Hardy Downtown Historic District	Hardy Downtown Historic District	September 22, 1995 (#95001121)	Roughly bounded by Kelly, Front, Church, and 3rd Sts. 36°18′58″N 91°28′56″W	Hardy	
12	Floyd Jackson House		December 17, 1998 (#98001516)	Jackson St. 36°18′57″N 91°29′46″W	Hardy	
13	David L. King House	David L. King House	October 4, 2002 (#02001076)	2nd and Kelly St. 36°18′58″N 91°28′46″W	Hardy	
14	Little Springs Missionary Baptist Church		June 7, 2016 (#16000321)	4040 AR 58; 36°04′32″N 91°28′33″W	Poughkeepsie	
15	Esther Locke House	Esther Locke House	December 17, 1998 (#98001509)	Junction of Spring and 3rd Sts. 36°19′02″N 91°28′56″W	Hardy	
16	Web Long House and Motel	Web Long House and Motel	December 17, 1998 (#98001512)	U.S. Route 63, east of its junction with Springwood Rd. 36°18′53″N 91°28′22″W	Hardy	
17	John McCaleb House	John McCaleb House	June 2, 1982 (#82002137)	Main St. 36°04′14″N 91°37′34″W	Evening Shade	
18	Poughkeepsie School Building	Poughkeepsie School Building	September 10, 1992 (#92001198)	Highway 58 south of County Road 137; 36°04′22″N 91°28′00″W	Poughkeepsie	
19	Charles W. Shaver House	Charles W. Shaver House	September 30, 1982 (#82002139)	Court St. 36°04′22″N 91°37′15″W	Evening Shade	
20	John W. Shaver House	John W. Shaver House	June 2, 1982 (#82002140)	Main St. 36°04′19″N 91°37′10″W	Evening Shade	
21	William Shaver House	William Shaver House	December 17, 1998 (#98001511)	School Ave., north of its junction with 4th St. 36°19′08″N 91°29′00″W	Hardy	
22	Silas Sherrill House	Silas Sherrill House	December 17, 1998 (#98001514)	Junction of 4th and Spring Sts. 36°19′05″N 91°28′56″W	Hardy	
23	Stokes House	Stokes House	June 2, 1982 (#82002141)	Cammack St. 36°04′15″N 91°37′07″W	Evening Shade	
24	Carrie Tucker House	Carrie Tucker House	February 12, 1999 (#99000156)	U.S. Routes 62/63, east of their junction with Echo Ln. 36°18′54″N 91°28′28″W	Hardy	
25	Thomas Walker House	Thomas Walker House	January 20, 2005 (#04001490)	201 N. Spring St. 36°18′52″N 91°28′57″W	Hardy	
26	Lee Weaver House	Lee Weaver House	December 17, 1998 (#98001508)	Junction of Main and Cope Sts. 36°18′59″N 91°28′44″W	Hardy	
27	Williford Methodist Church	Williford Methodist Church	November 27, 1992 (#92001629)	Northwest of the junction of Ferguson and Hail Sts. 36°15′10″N 91°21′34″W	Williford	
28	Woodland Courts	Woodland Courts	November 27, 1992 (#92001634)	Northwest of the junction of Dawson and Old CC Rds. 36°18′56″N 91°28′26″W	Hardy	

== Former listings ==
	Name on the Register	Image	Date listed	Date removed	Location	City or town	Description
1	Cochran Store	Cochran Store	June 2, 1982 (#82002133)	October 4, 1999	301 W Main St. 36°04′18″N 91°37′10″W	Evening Shade	Demolished
2	Herrn House	Herrn House	September 29, 1976 (#76000469)	October 4, 1999	215 W Main St. 36°04′15″N 91°37′25″W	Evening Shade	Destroyed by fire
3	Maxville School Building		September 10, 1992 (#92001199)	September 3, 1999	US 167 N of Cave City	Cave City	Delisted due to significant alterations to the property.
4	Metcalfe House		June 2, 1982 (#82002138)	January 14, 2002	Gin Drive; 36°04′13″N 91°37′04″W	Evening Shade	Destroyed by fire

== See also ==
- List of National Historic Landmarks in Arkansas
- National Register of Historic Places listings in Arkansas
