= Ernest Daugherty House =

Historic house in Arkansas, United States

- U.S. National Register of Historic Places
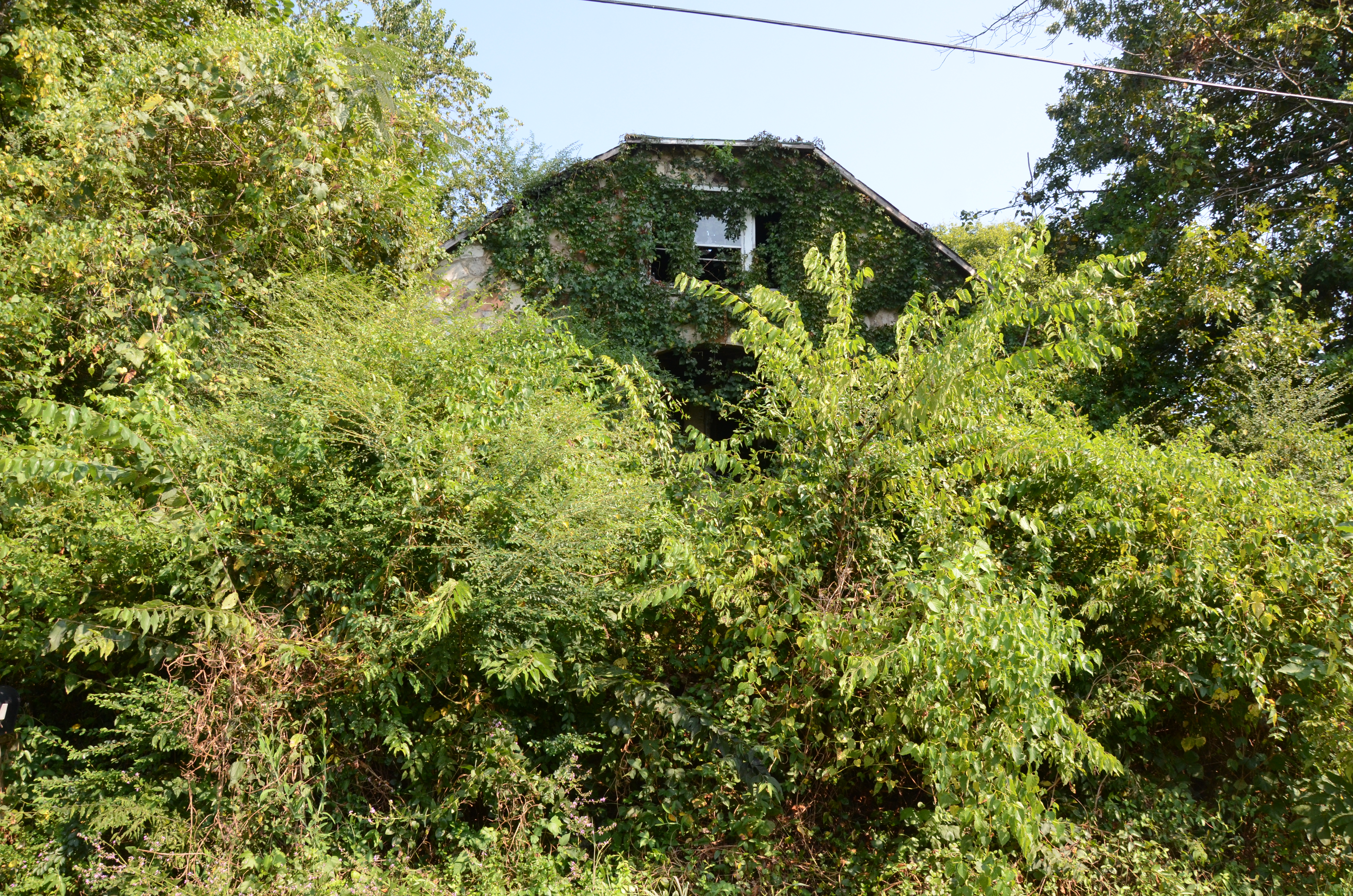

- Location within Arkansas Location within the United States
- Location: Third St., W of jct. with Kelly AVe., Hardy, Arkansas
- Coordinates: 36°18′29″N 91°28′49″W
- Area: less than one acre
- Built: 1932
- Built by: J.W. Boak
- Architectural style: Bungalow/American Craftsman
- MPS: Hardy, Arkansas MPS
- NRHP reference No.: 98001513
- Added to NRHP: December 17, 1998

The Ernest Daugherty House is a historic house on Third Street west of Kelly in Hardy, Arkansas. It is a stone structure, set into a hillside on the north side of Third Street, presenting 2 1/2 stories in the front and 1-1/2 in the rear. Rectangular in shape, it has a roof with clipped gables, and clipped-gable dormers on the sides, and exposed rafter tails. Built in 1932, it is an excellent local example of a stone house with Craftsman styling.

The house was listed on the National Register of Historic Places in 1998.

== See also ==
- National Register of Historic Places listings in Sharp County, Arkansas
