= W.A. Edwards House =

Historic house in Arkansas, United States

- W. A. Edwards House
- U.S. National Register of Historic Places
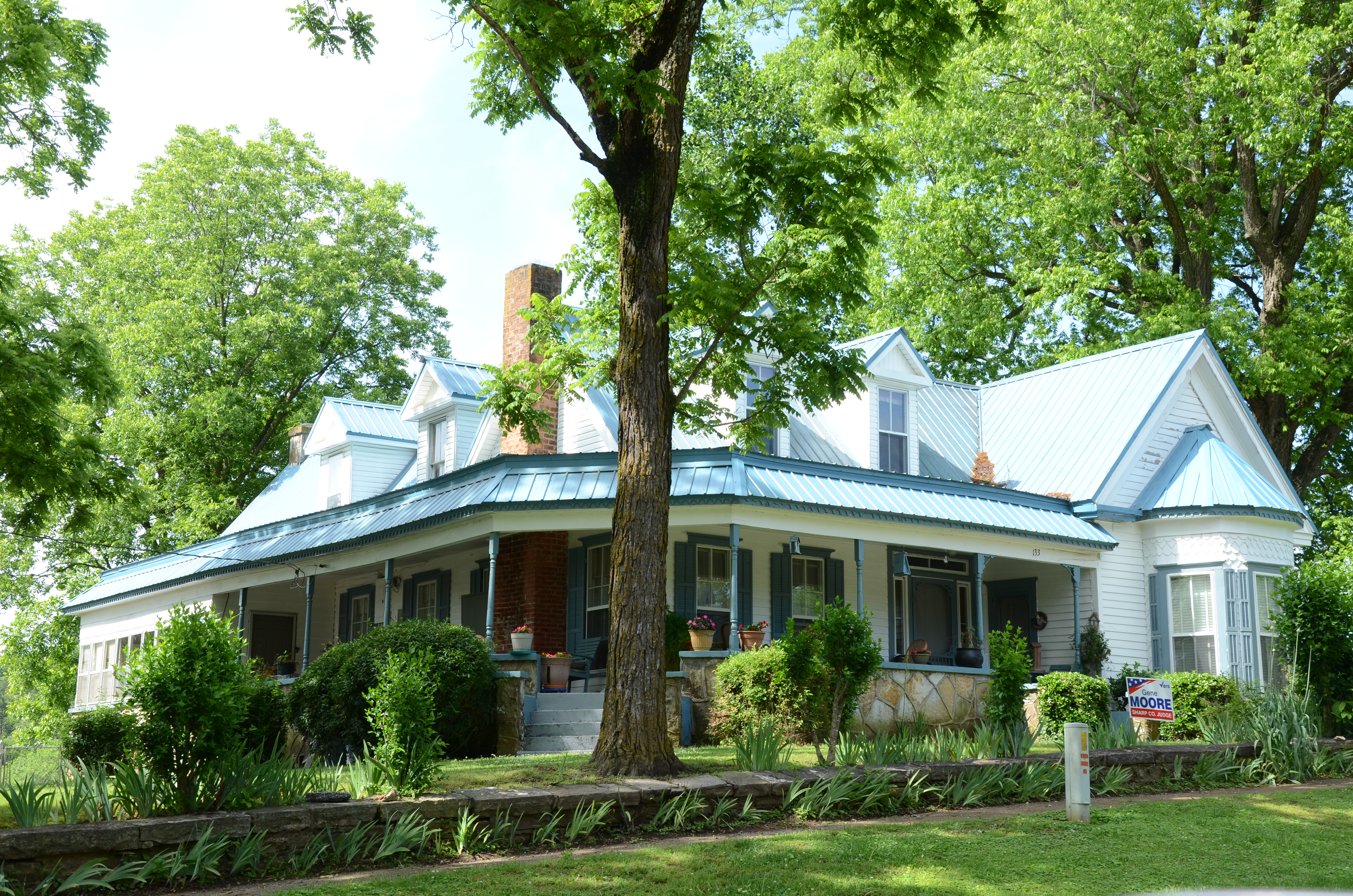

- Location within Arkansas Location within the United States
- Location: Main St., Evening Shade, Arkansas
- Coordinates: 36°4′16″N 91°37′12″W
- Area: 2 acres (0.81 ha)
- Built: 1890
- MPS: Evening Shade MRA
- NRHP reference No.: 82002136
- Added to NRHP: June 2, 1982

The W.A. Edwards House is a historic house on Main Street in Evening Shade, Arkansas. It is a 1 1/2-story wood-frame structure with a dormered side-gable roof, and a front-facing cross gable with decorative shingling. A single-story porch extends across much of the front and one side, supported by a sandstone foundation and turned posts. Built c. 1890, by a prominent local merchant, it is one of the community's few 19th-century buildings.

The house was listed on the National Register of Historic Places in 1982.

== See also ==
- National Register of Historic Places listings in Sharp County, Arkansas
