= Stokes House (Evening Shade, Arkansas) =

Historic house in Arkansas, United States

- U.S. National Register of Historic Places
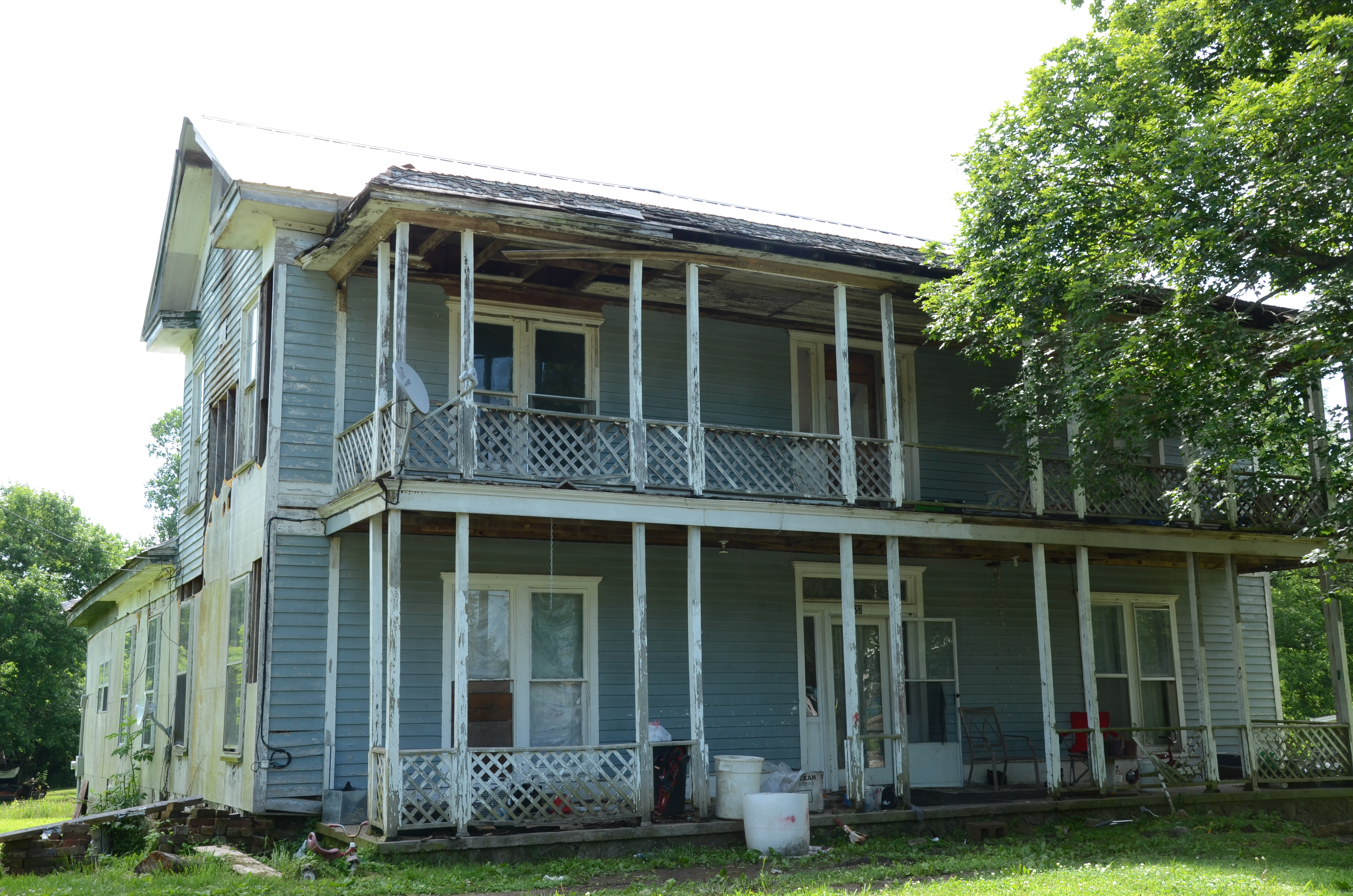

- Location within Arkansas Location within the United States
- Location: Cammack St., Evening Shade, Arkansas
- Coordinates: 36°4′15″N 91°37′7″W
- Area: less than one acre
- Built: 1882
- MPS: Evening Shade MRA
- NRHP reference No.: 82002141
- Added to NRHP: June 2, 1982

The Stokes House is a historic house on the east side of Cammack Street in Evening Shade, Arkansas. It is a two-story wood-frame structure with a side gable roof, and a pair of single-story additions extending to the rear. The front facade is dominated by an elegant Queen Anne porch, which is two stories in height and covers the full width of the house. It has delicate turned posts, a spindled frieze, and jigsaw-cut brackets. It is one of the community's finest examples of Queen Anne architecture.

The house was listed on the National Register of Historic Places in 1982.

== See also ==
- National Register of Historic Places listings in Sharp County, Arkansas
