= Fred Carter House =

Historic house in Arkansas, United States

- U.S. National Register of Historic Places
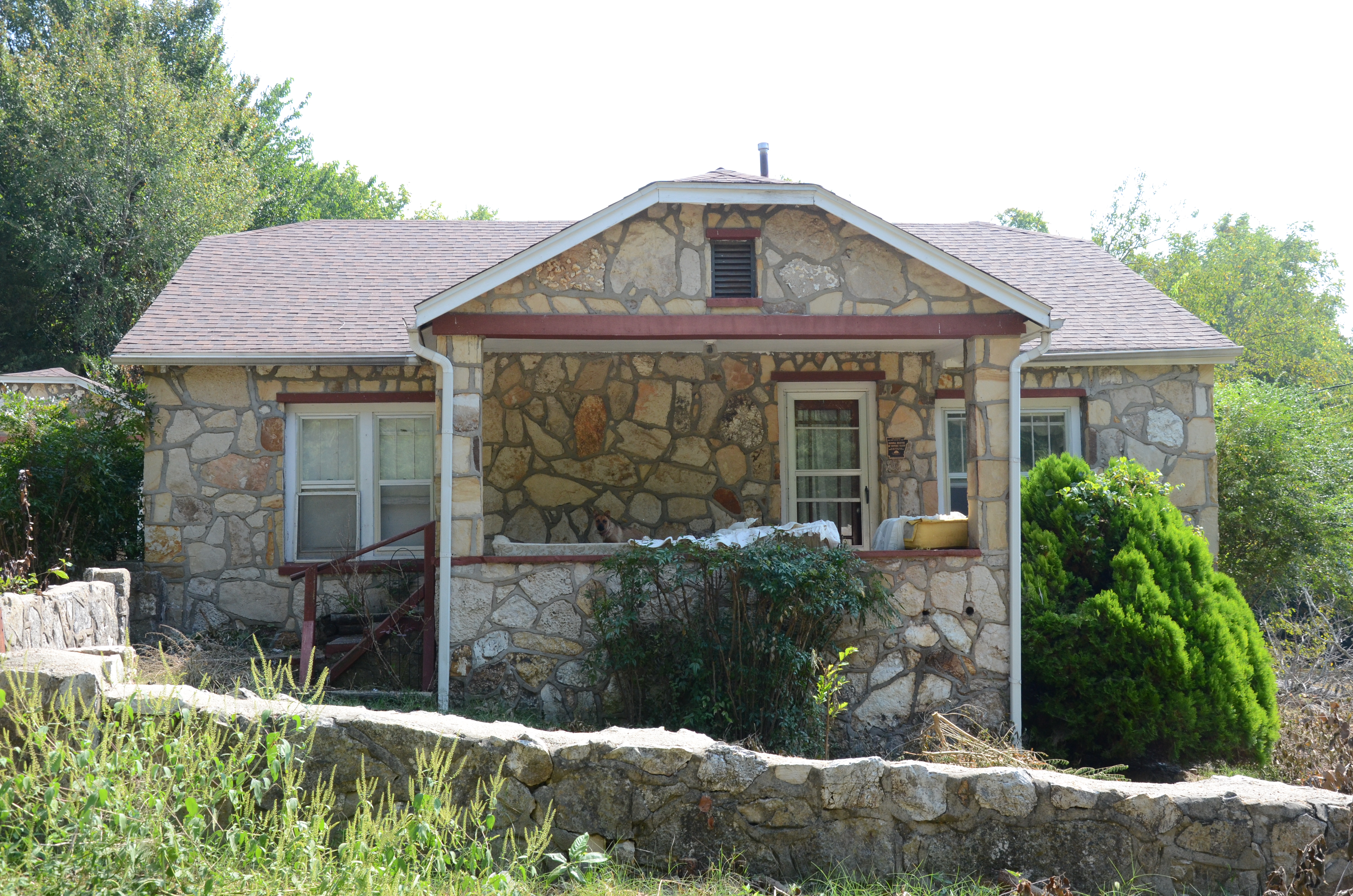

- Location within Arkansas Location within the United States
- Location: School Avenue, N of jct. with 4th Street, Hardy, Arkansas
- Coordinates: 36°19′9″N 91°29′2″W
- Area: less than one acre
- Built: 1947
- Architect: Roy Lee Johnson
- Architectural style: Bungalow/Craftsman
- MPS: Hardy, Arkansas MPS
- NRHP reference No.: 98001510
- Added to NRHP: December 17, 1998

The Fred Carter House is a historic house located on School Avenue, north of 4th Street, in Hardy, Arkansas.

== Description and history ==
It is a single-story fieldstone structure with a clipped gable roof and an irregular layout. A projecting stone porch also features a clipped-gable roof and provides access to the main entrance, and is flanked by pairs of sash windows. The property also includes a period stone wall and stone garage. The house was built c. 1947 for Fred and Doris Carter, and was the first to be built in this neighborhood, whose land had been tied up in an estate. It is also one of the first stone houses in the community that was built for middle-class working class owners, where earlier stone houses had been built for business owners and the like.

The house was listed on the National Register of Historic Places on December 17, 1998.

== See also ==
- National Register of Historic Places listings in Sharp County, Arkansas
