= Web Long House and Motel =

Historic house in Arkansas, United States

- U.S. National Register of Historic Places
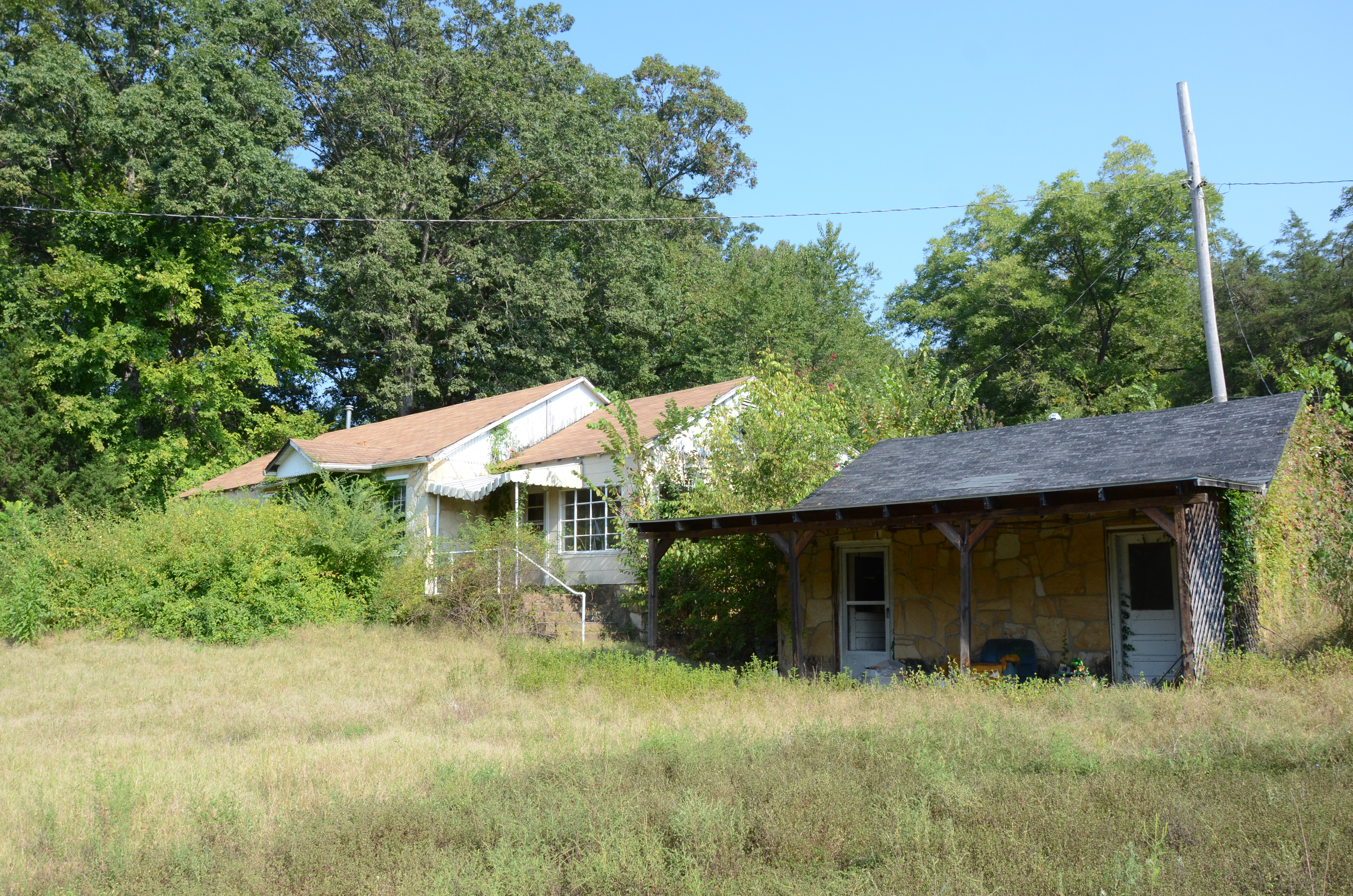

- Location within Arkansas Location within the United States
- Location: US 63, E of jct. with Springwood Rd., Hardy, Arkansas
- Coordinates: 36°18′53″N 91°28′22″W
- Area: 1.5 acres (0.61 ha)
- Built: 1943
- Architectural style: Bungalow/craftsman
- MPS: Hardy, Arkansas MPS
- NRHP reference No.: 98001512
- Added to NRHP: December 17, 1998

The Web Long House and Motel is a historic former motel complex on the north side of United States Route 63, just east of Springwood Road, on the outskirts of Hardy, Arkansas. The complex includes three buildings: a single-story stone house, which also served as the office for the motel, a duplex located just to its east, also built of flagstone, and a four-unit stone motel building facing south. The complex was built in 1943 by Web Long, president of the Hardy Development Council, as a home for his family and a business serving travelers. It is one of the earliest known examples of motel architecture in Sharp County.

The buildings were listed on the National Register of Historic Places in 1998.

== See also ==
- National Register of Historic Places listings in Sharp County, Arkansas
