= Lee Weaver House =

Historic house in Arkansas, United States

- U.S. National Register of Historic Places
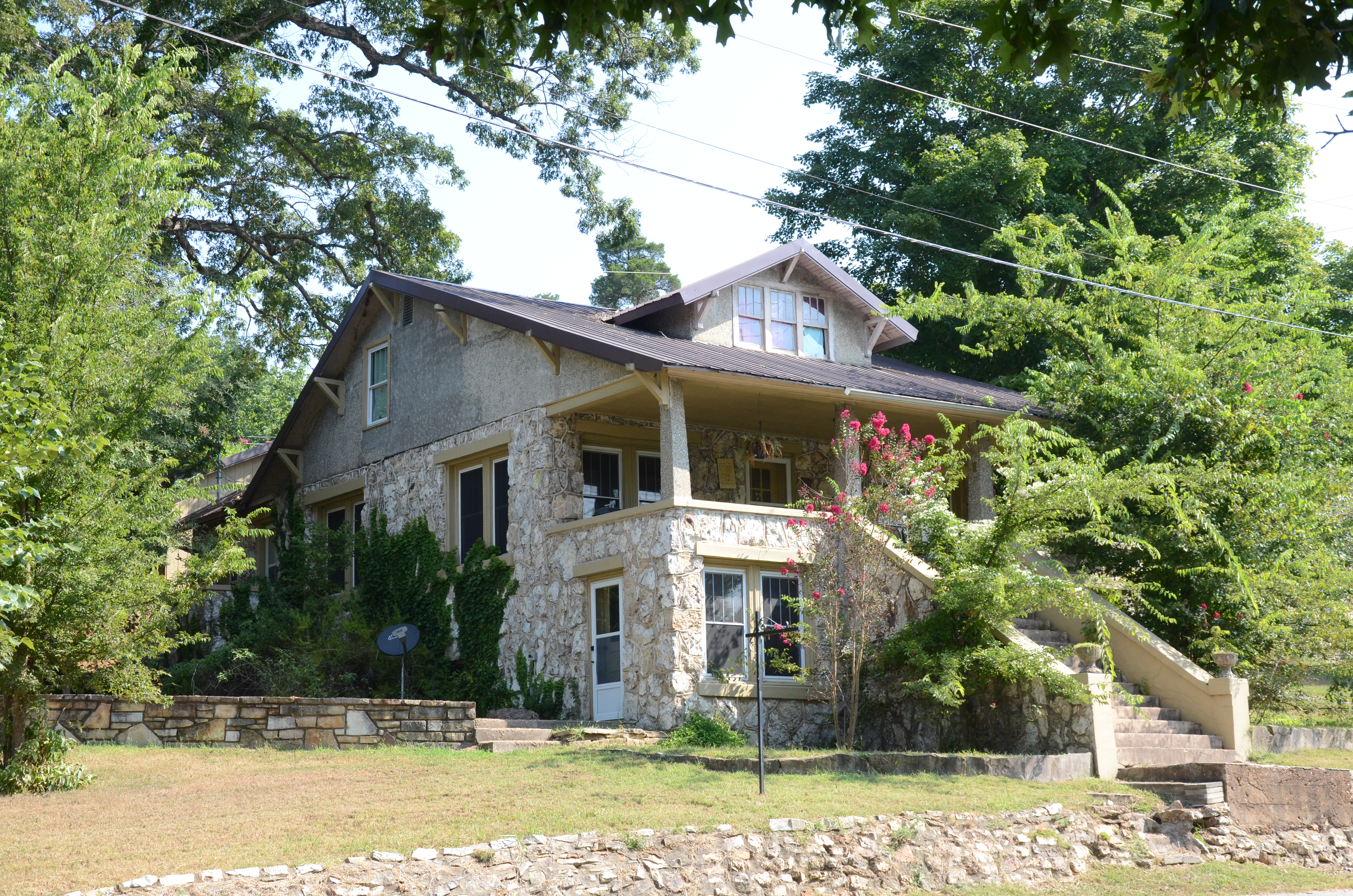

- Location within Arkansas Location within the United States
- Location: Jct. of Main and Cope Sts., Hardy, Arkansas
- Coordinates: 36°18′59″N 91°28′44″W
- Area: less than one acre
- Built: 1926
- Built by: Hank Morgan Lumber Co.
- Architectural style: Bungalow/Craftsman
- MPS: Hardy, Arkansas MPS
- NRHP reference No.: 98001508
- Added to NRHP: December 17, 1998

The Lee Weaver House is a historic house at the northwest corner of Main and Cope Streets in Hardy, Arkansas. Built 1924–26, this 1 1/2-story stone structure is a fine local example of the Bungalow style. It is fashioned out of native rough-cut stone, joined with beveled mortar. It has a side gable roof with a shallow pitch, and extended eaves with exposed rafter ends and knee braces. A wide gable-roof dormer with three sash windows pierces the front slope. The roof shelters a front porch supported by tapered square columns.

The house was listed on the National Register of Historic Places in 1998.

== See also ==
- National Register of Historic Places listings in Sharp County, Arkansas
