= Hardy Downtown Historic District =

Historic district in Arkansas, United States

- U.S. National Register of Historic Places
- U.S. Historic district
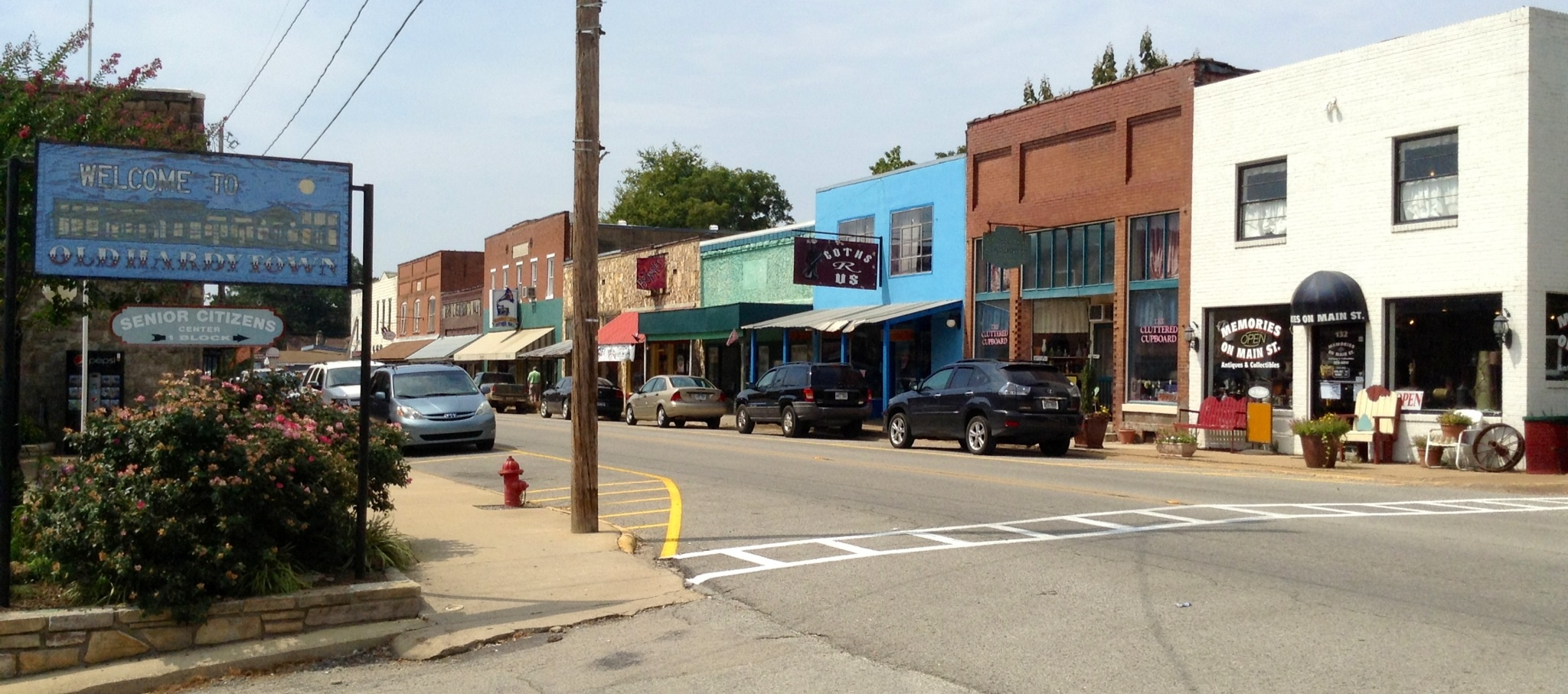
- Main Street view

- Location within Arkansas Location within the United States
- Location: Roughly bounded by Kelly, Front, Church and 3rd Sts., Hardy, Arkansas
- Area: 36 acres (15 ha)
- Built: 1880
- NRHP reference No.: 95001121
- Added to NRHP: September 22, 1995

The Hardy Downtown Historic District encompasses most of the central business district of the resort community of Hardy, Arkansas. It extends along Main Street, between Church and Cope Streets, and includes a few buildings on adjacent streets. Hardy was founded as a railroad town in the 1880s, but grew by the end of the 19th century into a resort community, serving as commercial center for vacationers from Memphis, Tennessee. Most of the 43 buildings in the district are between one and three stories in height, and of masonry construction. Twenty-four are historically significant, and many of the remaining buildings date to the early 20th century but have been altered in unsympathetic ways. Notable buildings include the Hardy Church of Christ, and the Raymond Daugherty House, one of the community's oldest buildings.

The district was listed on the National Register of Historic Places in 1995.

== See also ==
- National Register of Historic Places listings in Sharp County, Arkansas
