= Esther Locke House =

Historic house in Arkansas, United States

- U.S. National Register of Historic Places
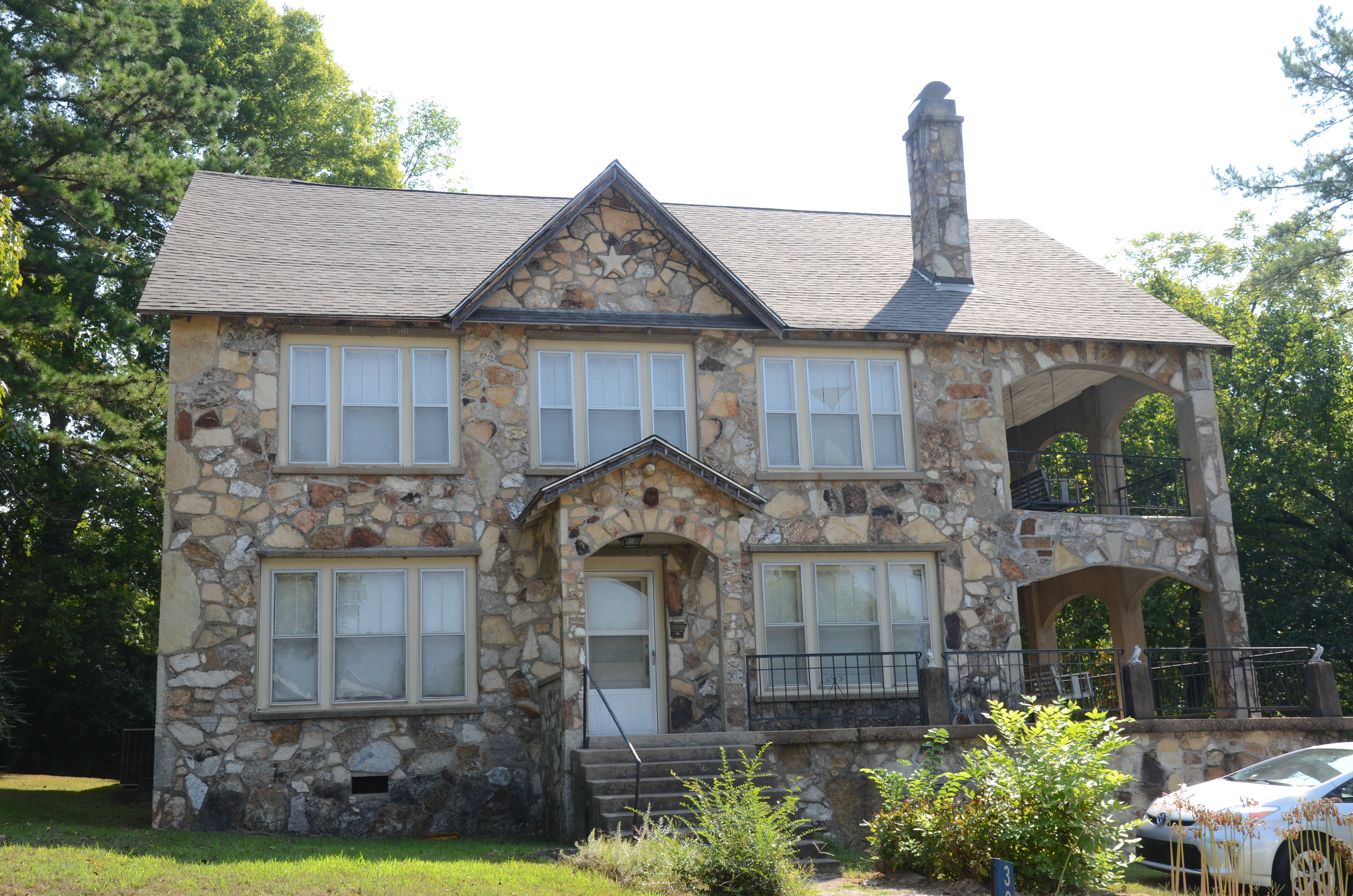

- Location within Arkansas Location within the United States
- Location: Jct. of Spring and Third Sts., Hardy, Arkansas
- Coordinates: 36°19′2″N 91°28′56″W
- Area: less than one acre
- Built: 1937
- Built by: J. W. Boak
- Architectural style: Plain traditional
- MPS: Hardy, Arkansas MPS
- NRHP reference No.: 98001509
- Added to NRHP: December 17, 1998

The Esther Locke House is a historic house at the southeast corner of Spring and 3rd Streets in Hardy, Arkansas. It is a large Plain Traditional rubble stone structure, with a gable roof and rubble stone foundation. The dominant feature of its main facade is a recessed two-story porch. Built in 1936–37, it is locally distinctive as a Depression-era structure built as a residence and rooming house. The downstairs housed Esther and Norma Sue Locke, who owned the property, and there were seven rooms upstairs that were rented to long-term tenants.

The house was listed on the National Register of Historic Places in 1998.

== See also ==
- National Register of Historic Places listings in Sharp County, Arkansas
