= Capt. Josiah Locke House =

Historic house in Massachusetts, United States

- U.S. National Register of Historic Places
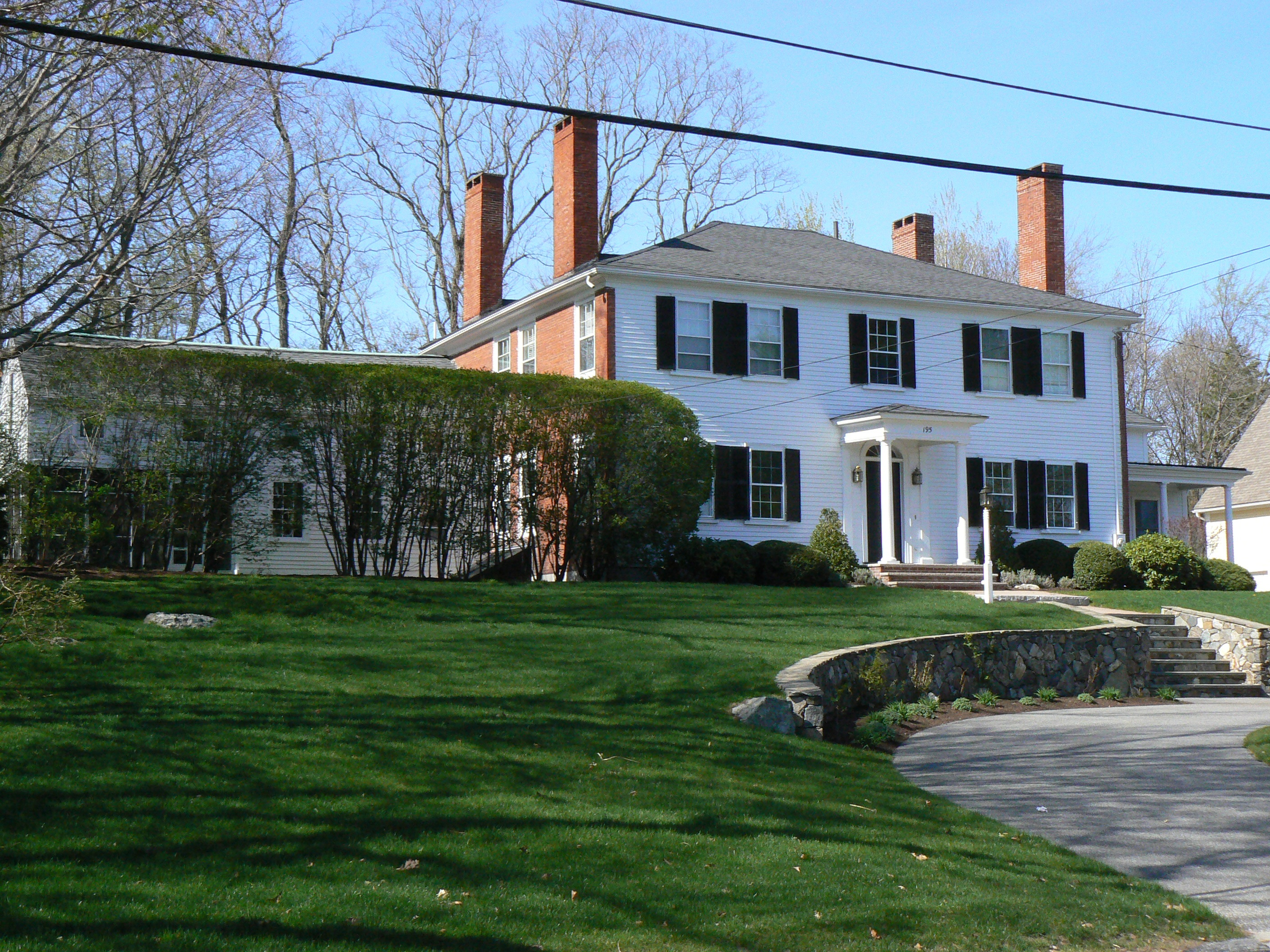

- Location within Massachusetts Location within the United States
- Location: 195 High Street, Winchester, Massachusetts
- Coordinates: 42°26′37″N 71°10′24″W
- Built: 1803
- Architectural style: Federal
- NRHP reference No.: 79000356
- Added to NRHP: March 2, 1979

The Capt. Josiah Locke House is a historic house in Winchester, Massachusetts. The two story wood frame Federal style house was built in 1803 by Josiah Locke, a captain in the Woburn militia (the area then being part of Woburn), in an area farmed by other members of his extended family (including his brother Asa). The interior of the house has retained significant early details, including period Federal and Greek Revival details, and very early wallpaper. The home is also notable as the residence of 9-time US Women's Figure Skating Champion Maribel Vinson Owen (1911-1961) and her daughter, 1961 US Women's Figure Skating Champion Laurence Owen (1944-1961), both of whom perished in the Sabena Flight 548 crash in February 1961.

The house was listed on the National Register of Historic Places in 1979.

== See also ==
- National Register of Historic Places listings in Winchester, Massachusetts
