= Fred Graham House =

Historic house in Arkansas, United States

- U.S. National Register of Historic Places
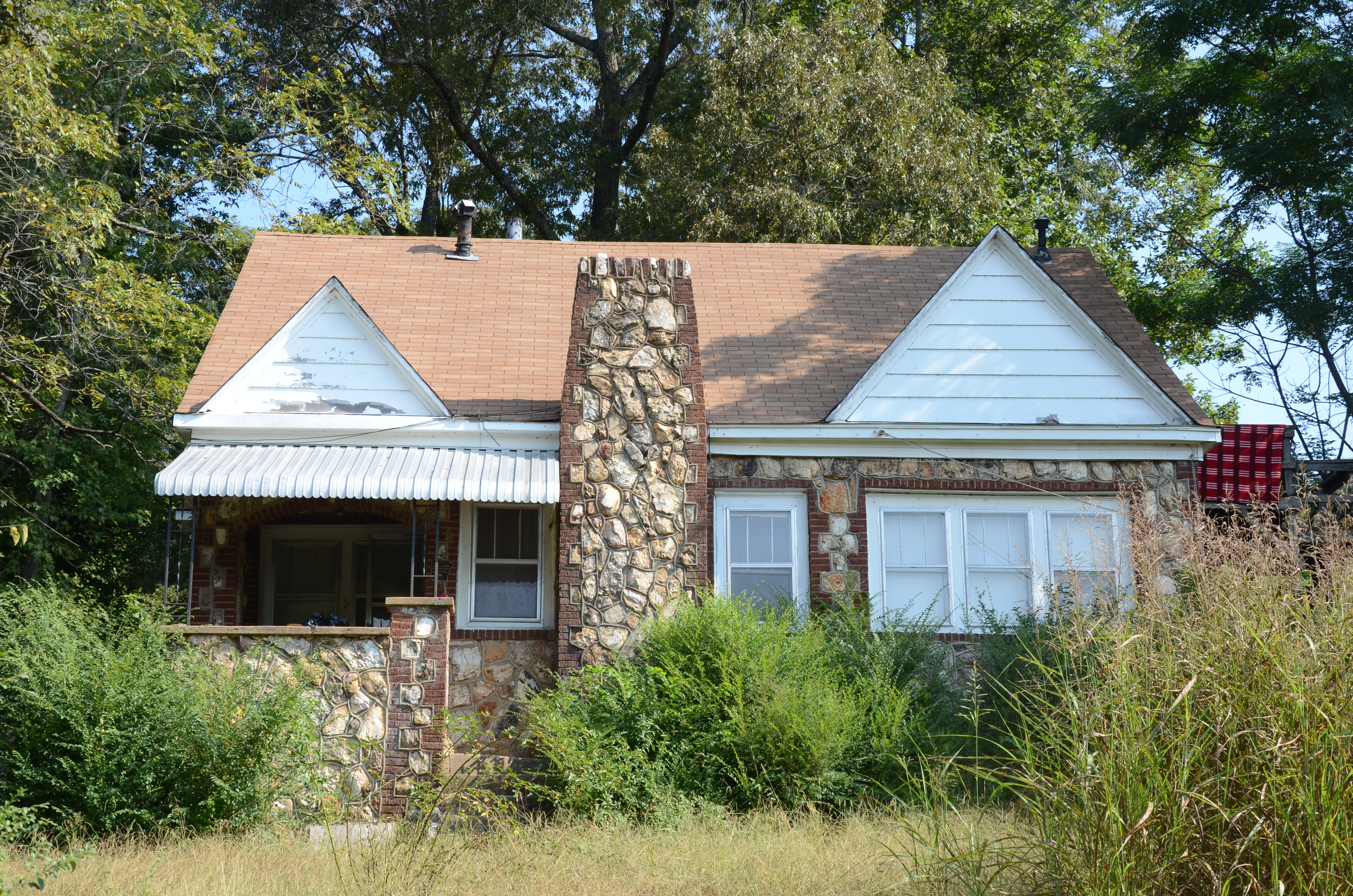

- Location within Arkansas Location within the United States
- Location: US 62, W of jct. with Springwood Rd., Hardy, Arkansas
- Coordinates: 36°18′53″N 91°28′27″W
- Area: less than one acre
- Built: 1931
- Architectural style: Bungalow/craftsman, Tudor Revival
- MPS: Hardy, Arkansas MPS
- NRHP reference No.: 99000157
- Added to NRHP: February 12, 1999

The Fred Graham House is a historic house on United States Route 62 in Hardy, Arkansas. It is a vernacular Tudor Revival structure, 1 1/2 stories in height, built out of uncoursed native fieldstone finished with beaded mortar. The roof is side gabled, with two front-facing cross gables. The south-facing front facade has a stone chimney with brick trim positioned just west of center between the cross gables, and a raised porch to the west of that. Built c. 1931, it is a fine local example of vernacular Tudor Revival architecture.

The house was listed on the National Register of Historic Places in 1999.

== See also ==
- National Register of Historic Places listings in Sharp County, Arkansas
