= Evening Shade, Arkansas =

- City
- Location of Evening Shade in Sharp County, Arkansas.
- Coordinates: 36°4′14″N 91°37′17″W
- Country: United States
- State: Arkansas
- County: Sharp

Area
  - Total: 1.66 sq mi (4.31 km^{2})
  - Land: 1.66 sq mi (4.31 km^{2})
  - Water: 0 sq mi (0.00 km^{2})
- Elevation: 459 ft (140 m)

Population (2020)
  - Total: 420
  - Estimate (2025): 433 ▲
  - Density: 252.2/sq mi (97.36/km^{2})
- Time zone: UTC−6 (Central (CST))
  - Summer (DST): UTC−5 (CDT)
- ZIP Code: 72532
- Area code: 870
- FIPS code: 05-22360
- GNIS feature ID: 2403582

Evening Shade is a city in southwest Sharp County, Arkansas, United States. As of 2022, the population was 429.

== Name origin ==
Evening Shade was named in 1817 from the density of shade cast by the tall pine timber on an adjacent hill.

== History ==
Evening Shade was a part of Lawrence County until 1868. In July 1868, Evening Shade became the county seat of the newly created Sharp County. In 1894, Hardy, in the northern part of the county, was given the designation of county seat alongside Evening Shade. The two cities served as the county seats of Sharp County until 1967, when Ash Flat became the county seat.

On March 6, 2022, a strong EF2 tornado struck the town, impacting two houses.

It has frequently been noted on lists of unusual place names.

== Geography ==
Evening Shade is located at 36°4′14″N 91°37′17″W (36.070507, −91.621411).

According to the United States Census Bureau, the town has a total area of 1.6 square miles (4.1 km^{2}), all land.

=== Climate ===
The climate in this area is characterized by hot, humid summers and generally mild to cool winters. According to the Köppen Climate Classification system, Evening Shade has a humid subtropical climate, abbreviated "Cfa" on climate maps.

Climate data for Evening Shade, Arkansas (1991–2020 normals, extremes 1923–1926, 1964–present)
Month	Jan	Feb	Mar	Apr	May	Jun	Jul	Aug	Sep	Oct	Nov	Dec	Year
Record high °F (°C)	81 (27)	86 (30)	93 (34)	96 (36)	99 (37)	108 (42)	113 (45)	112 (44)	107 (42)	96 (36)	88 (31)	80 (27)	113 (45)
Mean maximum °F (°C)	69.1 (20.6)	74.5 (23.6)	81.7 (27.6)	85.6 (29.8)	89.8 (32.1)	95.9 (35.5)	99.3 (37.4)	100.1 (37.8)	95.3 (35.2)	88.1 (31.2)	77.8 (25.4)	69.6 (20.9)	101.8 (38.8)
Mean daily maximum °F (°C)	45.4 (7.4)	50.6 (10.3)	59.8 (15.4)	69.8 (21.0)	76.9 (24.9)	85.1 (29.5)	89.2 (31.8)	88.5 (31.4)	81.7 (27.6)	71.3 (21.8)	58.3 (14.6)	47.8 (8.8)	68.7 (20.4)
Daily mean °F (°C)	34.7 (1.5)	38.8 (3.8)	47.7 (8.7)	57.2 (14.0)	65.5 (18.6)	74.0 (23.3)	77.9 (25.5)	76.7 (24.8)	69.2 (20.7)	57.8 (14.3)	46.4 (8.0)	37.5 (3.1)	56.9 (13.8)
Mean daily minimum °F (°C)	24.0 (−4.4)	27.1 (−2.7)	35.6 (2.0)	44.6 (7.0)	54.2 (12.3)	63.0 (17.2)	66.6 (19.2)	64.9 (18.3)	56.7 (13.7)	44.2 (6.8)	34.4 (1.3)	27.1 (−2.7)	45.2 (7.3)
Mean minimum °F (°C)	5.5 (−14.7)	9.7 (−12.4)	17.8 (−7.9)	28.0 (−2.2)	38.1 (3.4)	51.8 (11.0)	57.3 (14.1)	54.2 (12.3)	40.0 (4.4)	27.8 (−2.3)	18.1 (−7.7)	11.3 (−11.5)	2.8 (−16.2)
Record low °F (°C)	−15 (−26)	−13 (−25)	2 (−17)	20 (−7)	30 (−1)	39 (4)	46 (8)	43 (6)	30 (−1)	19 (−7)	5 (−15)	−13 (−25)	−15 (−26)
Average precipitation inches (mm)	3.53 (90)	3.69 (94)	4.88 (124)	5.54 (141)	5.59 (142)	3.23 (82)	4.32 (110)	3.82 (97)	3.35 (85)	4.06 (103)	4.91 (125)	4.53 (115)	51.45 (1,307)
Average snowfall inches (cm)	1.8 (4.6)	2.6 (6.6)	1.4 (3.6)	0.1 (0.25)	0.0 (0.0)	0.0 (0.0)	0.0 (0.0)	0.0 (0.0)	0.0 (0.0)	0.1 (0.25)	0.0 (0.0)	0.7 (1.8)	6.7 (17)
Average precipitation days (≥ 0.01 in)	8.2	7.7	9.4	9.0	10.5	7.6	8.1	7.5	6.2	8.4	8.5	8.5	99.6
Average snowy days (≥ 0.1 in)	1.3	1.1	0.4	0.1	0.0	0.0	0.0	0.0	0.0	0.0	0.1	0.8	3.8
Source: NOAA

== Demographics ==
Historical population
Census	Pop.	Note	%±
1880	286		—
1890	281		−1.7%
1900	312		11.0%
1910	289		−7.4%
1920	290		0.3%
1930	325		12.1%
1940	347		6.8%
1950	360		3.7%
1960	232		−35.6%
1970	309		33.2%
1980	397		28.5%
1990	328		−17.4%
2000	465		41.8%
2010	432		−7.1%
2020	420		−2.8%
2025 (est.)	433	▲	3.1%
U.S. Decennial Census; 2018 Estimate

As of the census of 2000, there were 465 people, 204 households, and 137 families residing in the town. The population density was 294.2 inhabitants per square mile (113.6/km^{2}). There were 244 housing units at an average density of 154.4 per square mile (59.6/km^{2}). The racial makeup of the town was 98.49% White, and 1.51% from two or more races. 0.22% of the population were Hispanic or Latino of any race.

There were 204 households, out of which 28.9% had children under the age of 18 living with them, 53.9% were married couples living together, 10.3% had a female householder with no husband present, and 32.8% were non-families. Of all households, 31.9% were made up of individuals, and 17.2% had someone living alone who was 65 years of age or older. The average household size was 2.28 and the average family size was 2.88.

In the town the population was spread out, with 25.2% under the age of 18, 6.7% from 18 to 24, 25.2% from 25 to 44, 24.9% from 45 to 64, and 18.1% who were 65 years of age or older. The median age was 40 years. For every 100 females, there were 86.0 males. For every 100 females age 18 and over, there were 84.1 males.

The median income for a household in the town was $24,500, and the median income for a family was $31,111. Males had a median income of $23,958 versus $15,833 for females. The per capita income for the town was $13,662. About 8.1% of families and 10.9% of the population were below the poverty line, including 8.3% of those under age 18 and 23.2% of those age 65 or over.

== Education ==
Public education for early childhood, elementary and secondary school students is available from the Cave City School District, which includes the Evening Shade Math & Science Academy (kindergarten through grade four) in Evening Shade, as well as Cave City Intermediate School, Cave City Middle School, and Cave City High School in Cave City.

On July 1, 2004, the Evening Shade School District was annexed into the Cave City School District.

== In popular culture ==
Evening Shade was nominally the locale for the 1990–1994 TV series called Evening Shade, about a former pro football player who moves back to his Arkansas childhood home to coach the local school football team.
