= Hardy, Arkansas =

City in Sharp and Fulton counties, US

- City
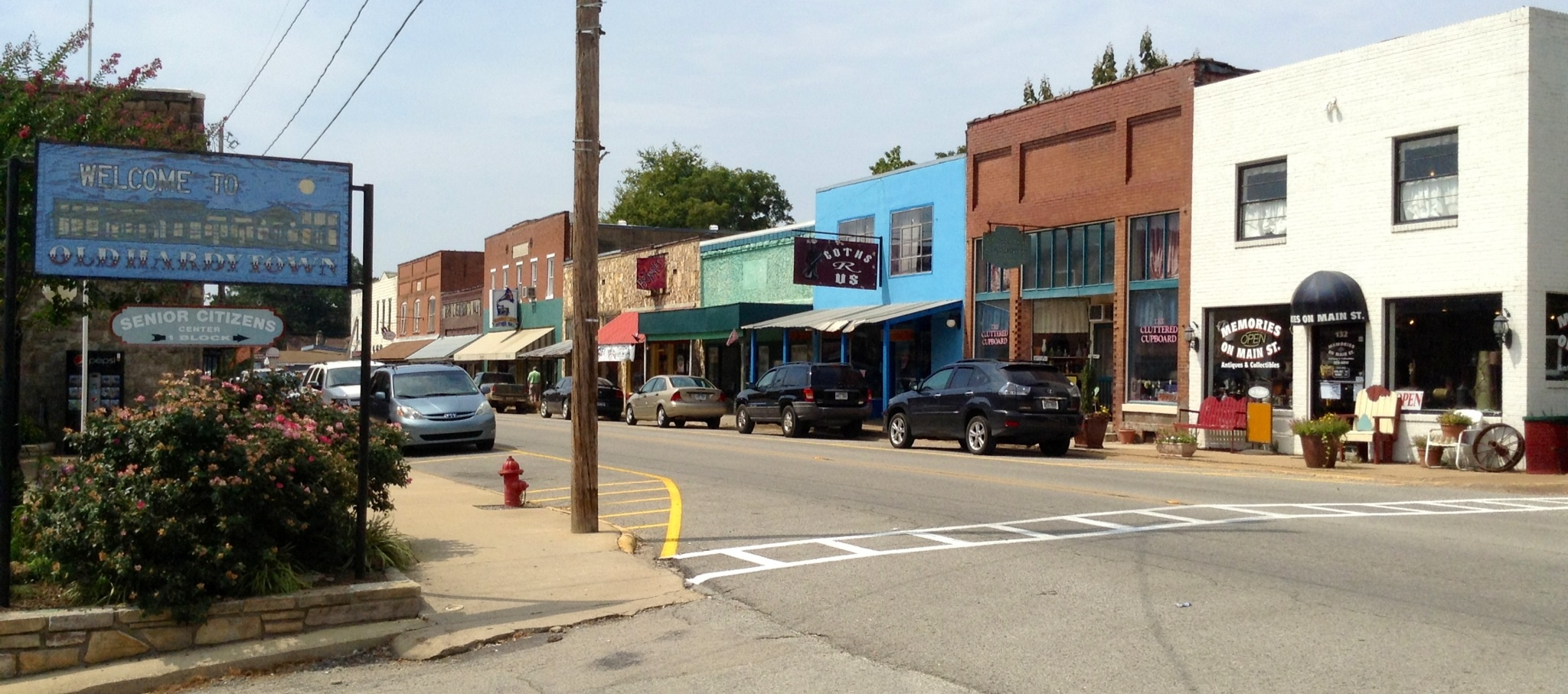
- Downtown Hardy

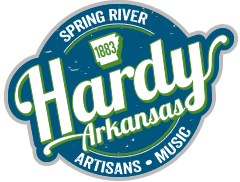
- Logo

- Location of Hardy in Fulton County and Sharp County, Arkansas.
- Coordinates: 36°19′14″N 91°28′50″W
- Country: United States
- State: Arkansas
- Counties: Sharp, Fulton

Government
  - Mayor: Eathan Barnes

Area
  - Total: 5.31 sq mi (13.76 km^{2})
  - Land: 5.05 sq mi (13.09 km^{2})
  - Water: 0.26 sq mi (0.67 km^{2})
- Elevation: 440 ft (130 m)

Population (2020)
  - Total: 743
  - Estimate (2025): 780 ▲
  - Density: 147.0/sq mi (56.74/km^{2})
- Time zone: UTC-6 (Central (CST))
  - Summer (DST): UTC-5 (CDT)
- ZIP codes: 72525, 72529, 72542
- Area code: 870
- FIPS code: 05-29920
- GNIS feature ID: 2403800
- Website: www.cityofhardy.org

Hardy is the 2nd oldest city in Sharp and Fulton counties in the U.S. state of Arkansas. The population was 770 in 2024.

== Geography ==
Hardy is located at 36°19′14″N 91°28′50″W (36.320553, -91.480645).

The Spring River, which begins in Mammoth Spring, flows through Hardy. The Spring River flows into the Black River, which flows into the White River, and the White River eventually empties into the Mississippi River.

US 63 is the main highway which runs through the town. In its course through Arkansas, Route 63 runs from the Missouri state line at Mammoth Spring to connect with I-55 near Gilmore.

When roads were poor and travel much more difficult, Hardy was one of two county seats of Sharp County. The other was Evening Shade. In 1963, Ash Flat was named the county seat, and Hardy and Evening Shade lost that designation.

Hardy is served by the BNSF Railway. Formerly, the railroad through Hardy was part of the Frisco (St. Louis – San Francisco Railway) which had about 5,000 miles (8,000 km) of trackage, and served Arkansas, Missouri, Oklahoma, Kansas, Texas, Tennessee, Alabama, Mississippi, and Florida. In 1980, the much larger Burlington Northern acquired the Frisco and integrated it into its own system.

According to the United States Census Bureau, the city has a total area of 5.4 square miles (14.0 km^{2}), of which 5.2 square miles (13.4 km^{2}) is land and 0.23 square miles (0.6 km^{2}), or 4.63%, is water.

=== Climate ===
Climate data for Hardy, Arkansas (1991–2020)
Month	Jan	Feb	Mar	Apr	May	Jun	Jul	Aug	Sep	Oct	Nov	Dec	Year
Mean daily maximum °F (°C)	45.8 (7.7)	50.3 (10.2)	59.7 (15.4)	69.8 (21.0)	77.0 (25.0)	85.4 (29.7)	89.4 (31.9)	88.6 (31.4)	81.3 (27.4)	70.9 (21.6)	58.2 (14.6)	48.2 (9.0)	68.7 (20.4)
Daily mean °F (°C)	36.0 (2.2)	40.1 (4.5)	48.9 (9.4)	58.7 (14.8)	66.9 (19.4)	75.3 (24.1)	79.1 (26.2)	78.1 (25.6)	70.5 (21.4)	59.5 (15.3)	47.9 (8.8)	39.4 (4.1)	58.4 (14.7)
Mean daily minimum °F (°C)	26.3 (−3.2)	29.8 (−1.2)	38.1 (3.4)	47.7 (8.7)	56.7 (13.7)	65.3 (18.5)	68.9 (20.5)	67.5 (19.7)	59.6 (15.3)	48.2 (9.0)	37.6 (3.1)	30.5 (−0.8)	48.0 (8.9)
Average precipitation inches (mm)	3.76 (96)	3.71 (94)	4.82 (122)	5.25 (133)	5.53 (140)	3.65 (93)	3.71 (94)	3.98 (101)	4.35 (110)	3.99 (101)	4.50 (114)	4.19 (106)	51.44 (1,304)
Average snowfall inches (cm)	1.6 (4.1)	2.0 (5.1)	1.8 (4.6)	0.0 (0.0)	0.0 (0.0)	0.0 (0.0)	0.0 (0.0)	0.0 (0.0)	0.0 (0.0)	0.0 (0.0)	0.3 (0.76)	1.0 (2.5)	6.7 (17.06)
Source: NOAA

== History ==
In the early 1950s, the Horrell and Clay families both had grocery stores there. Conway Horn ran a general mercantile store. Charles Cone ran the Western Auto Store. Two places to eat were Bonnie's Cafe and Mrs. Rogers' sundries store. Arthur Snow was a pharmacist and owned a drugstore. The agent for the Frisco Railroad was Virgil L. Walker, Jr. Dink Booth was the barber. The Thomsons ran the movie theater, and Ben Dalton published a newspaper. Ottie Cate ran a poultry and ice house, and Bill Shaver had the Standard Oil service station. Tom Walker was in charge of the local bank, and Woodrow Wilson ran a Mobil service station. "Peavine" Clouse was the city marshal. "Guinea" Gray was a local painter, and Clifford Brummet had the contract to carry the mail between the post office and the arriving trains. He also had a farm near Hardy. Arthur Garner sold real estate. Dewey Dark ran the Rose Hill Resort. Doctor Miller was a local medical doctor. Leonard Johns worked at the Post Office.

The Discovery Channel reality television series Clash of the Ozarks is set in Hardy. The program focuses on the lives of the people in the community.

== Demographics ==
Historical population
Census	Pop.	Note	%±
1900	347		—
1910	329		−5.2%
1920	399		21.3%
1930	508		27.3%
1940	721		41.9%
1950	599		−16.9%
1960	555		−7.3%
1970	692		24.7%
1980	643		−7.1%
1990	538		−16.3%
2000	578		7.4%
2010	772		33.6%
2020	743		−3.8%
2025 (est.)	780	▲	5.0%
U.S. Decennial Census

=== 2020 census ===
Hardy racial composition
Race	Number	Percentage
White (non-Hispanic)	680	91.52%
Black or African American (non-Hispanic)	1	0.13%
Native American	9	1.21%
Asian	1	0.13%
Other/Mixed	33	4.44%
Hispanic or Latino	19	2.56%

As of the 2020 United States census, there were 743 people, 352 households, and 181 families residing in the city.

=== 2000 census ===
As of the census of 2000, there were 578 people, 298 households, and 159 families residing in the city. The population density was 244.7 inhabitants per square mile (94.5/km^{2}). There were 489 housing units at an average density of 207.0 per square mile (79.9/km^{2}). The racial makeup of the city was 95.33% White, 1.04% Native American, 0.52% Asian, and 3.11% from two or more races. 0.52% of the population were Hispanic or Latino of any race.

There were 298 households, of which 17.4% had children under the age of 18 living with them, 40.9% were married couples living together, 9.7% had a female householder with no husband present, and 46.6% were non-families. 43.6% of all households were made up of individuals, and 23.8% had someone living alone who was 65 years of age or older. The average household size was 1.94 and the average family size was 2.67.

In the city, the population was spread out, with 16.8% under the age of 18, 6.9% from 18 to 24, 20.4% from 25 to 44, 27.9% from 45 to 64, and 28.0% who were 65 years of age or older. The median age was 49 years. For every 100 females, there were 79.5 males. For every 100 females age 18 and over, there were 73.6 males.

The median income for a household in the city was $17,375, and the median income for a family was $25,500. Males had a median income of $20,208 versus $17,857 for females. The per capita income for the city was $12,204. About 12.2% of families and 23.4% of the population were below the poverty line, including 23.6% of those under age 18 and 28.6% of those age 65 or over.

== Education ==
It is served by the Highland School District, which operates Highland High School. The Highland district was formed from the 1962 consolidation of the Ash Flat School District and the Hardy School District. Due to the previous rivalry between the two districts, some members of the community were unsure whether the vote to consolidate would succeed.

== Notable people ==
- The Wilburn Brothers Doyle and Teddy born here in 1930 and 1931.
