= March 2026 North American blizzard =

Weather event in the United States

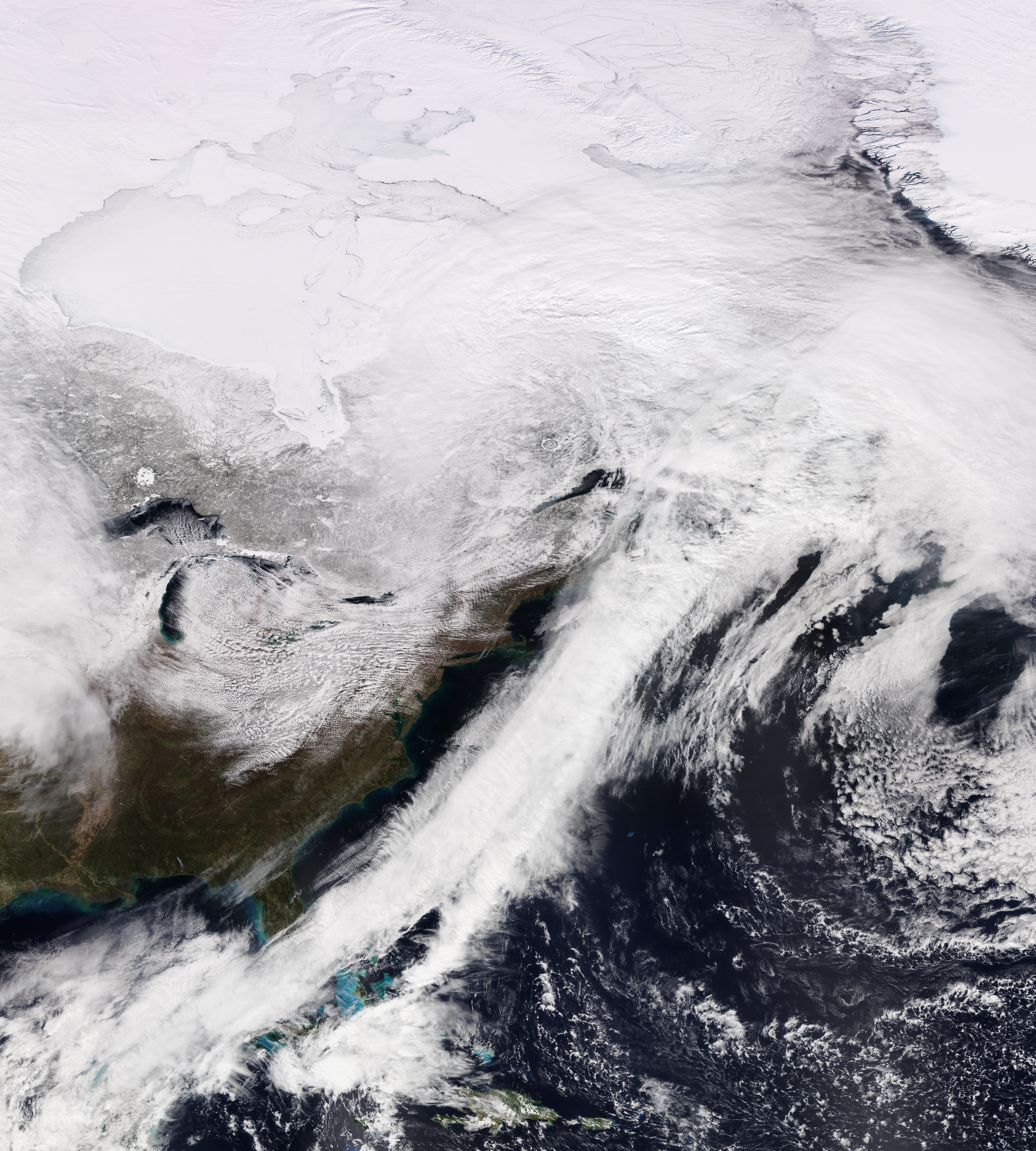
- A satellite image of the powerful storm over eastern Canada on March 17

Meteorological history
- Formed: March 13, 2026
- Exited land: March 17, 2026
- Dissipated: March 19, 2026

Category 5 "Extreme" blizzard
- Regional snowfall index: 26.97 (NOAA)
- Highest gusts: 69 mph (111 km/h) near Grand Marais, Michigan
- Lowest pressure: 944 mbar (hPa); 27.88 inHg
- Max. snowfall: Snow – 52 in (130 cm) near Round Lake, Michigan; Ice – 0.75 in (19 mm) in Alpena, Michigan

Tornado outbreak
- Tornadoes: 56
- Max. rating: EF1 tornado
- Highest winds: Tornadic – 110 mph (180 km/h) (Caneyville, Kentucky EF1 on March 15); Straight-line – 77 mph (124 km/h) near Minturn, Arkansas on March 15
- Largest hail: 2.5 in (6.4 cm) near Cushing, Texas on March 15

Overall effects
- Fatalities: 3 total (Note: Winter weather related)
- Damage: $1.4 billion (2026 USD)
- Areas affected: Pacific Northwest, High Plains, Upper Midwest, Ohio Valley, Appalachia, East Coast of the United States, Canada
- Power outages: > 500,000
- Part of the 2025–26 North American winter and tornado outbreaks of 2026

From March 13–17, 2026, a large and powerful extratropical cyclone produced a variety of significant weather across the Central United States and portions of southern Canada, consisting of a major and historic blizzard – which was unofficially referred to as Winter Storm Iona by the Weather Channel and other media – that affected much of the Upper Midwest and High Plains with up to 3–4 feet (36–48 in; 91–122 cm) of snow, an ice storm over northern Michigan and a severe weather outbreak consisting of damaging winds, large hail and tornadoes across the Lower Mississippi Valley, the Southeastern United States, the Carolinas, and the Mid Atlantic states. The overall system first moved onshore in the Pacific Northwest on March 13, dumping heavy snowfall primarily over the mountainous regions there. Emerging off the Rocky Mountains late on March 14, the storm strengthened as it moved northeastwards.

Widespread winter weather alerts, including winter storm warnings and blizzard warnings were issued from the state of Washington to Wisconsin and the Upper Peninsula of Michigan. Many governors, primarily in the Upper Midwest, issued states of emergencies as forecasts of 2–3 feet (24–36 in; 61–91 cm) were expected in the heaviest accumulations. Hundreds of flights were cancelled across the states of Minnesota and Wisconsin as well. On the severe side of the system, the Storm Prediction Center on March 15 issued an enhanced risk of severe weather across the South, with multiple tornado watches issued. The outbreak was expected to continue into the next day in the Carolinas and Mid-Atlantic, with a moderate risk of severe weather forecast.

As of March 16, at least three fatalities have been confirmed as a result of the winter weather side of the system, and at least 500,000 people were estimated to have lost power. Total damage costs were estimated to be approximately US$1.4 billion. It is the first storm to be rated as a Category 5 on the Regional Snowfall Index since the January 2016 United States blizzard.

== Meteorological history ==
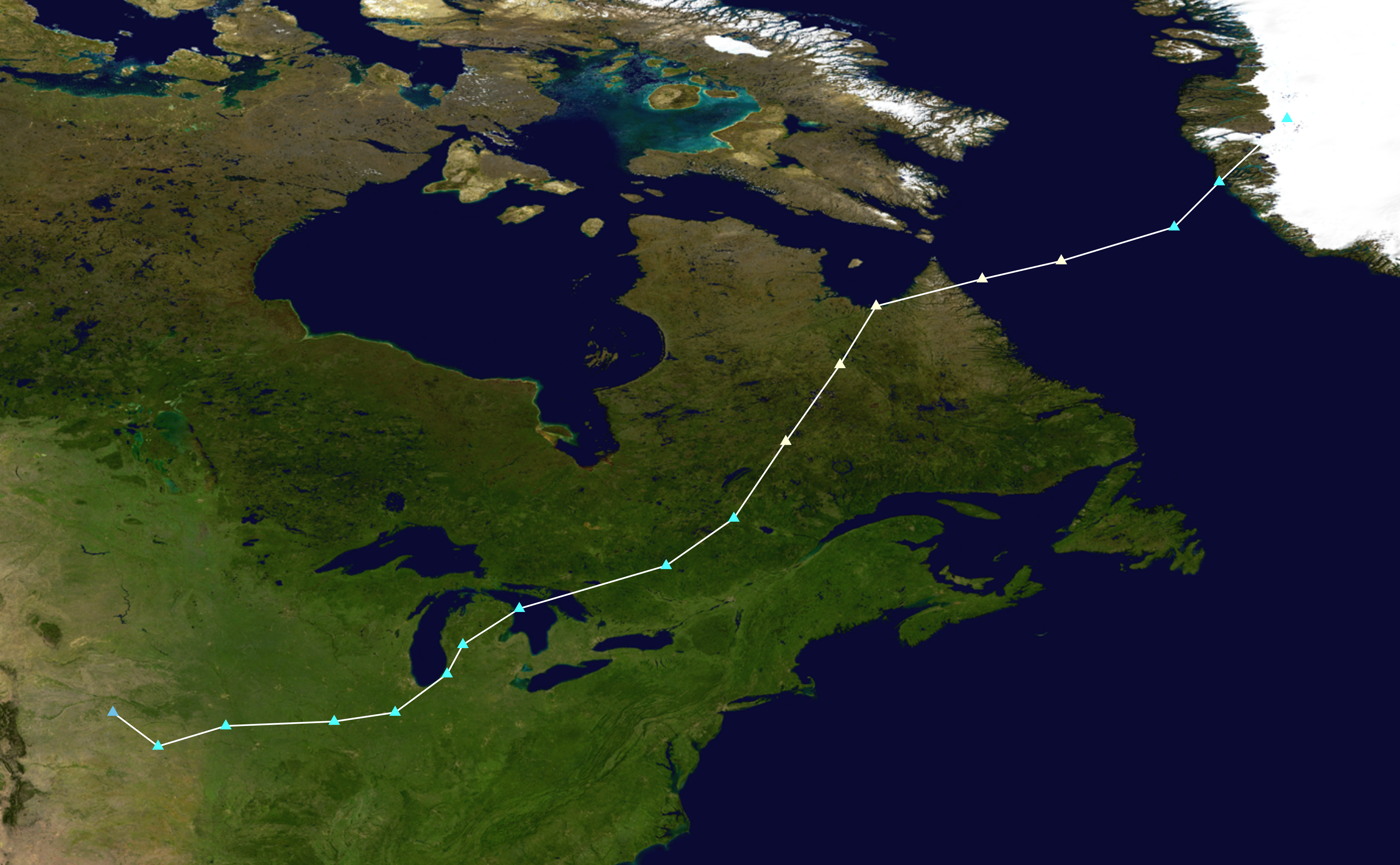
Map plotting the storm's track and intensity, according to the Saffir–Simpson scale Map key Saffir–Simpson scale Tropical depression (≤38 mph, ≤62 km/h) Tropical storm (39–73 mph, 63–118 km/h) Category 1 (74–95 mph, 119–153 km/h) Category 2 (96–110 mph, 154–177 km/h) Category 3 (111–129 mph, 178–208 km/h) Category 4 (130–156 mph, 209–251 km/h) Category 5 (≥157 mph, ≥252 km/h) Unknown Storm type Tropical cyclone Subtropical cyclone Extratropical cyclone, remnant low, tropical disturbance, or monsoon depression

On March 12, an atmospheric river interacted with Arctic air from Canada, producing snowfall across the northern United States Rockies and the northern High Plains on March 13. Throughout March 14, the system moved eastwards slowly deepening, before evolving into a Colorado low as a surface low emerged from the Rocky Mountains. By 03:00 UTC on March 15, the Weather Prediction Center (WPC) began issuing periodic storm summary bulletins on the developing storm. The storm produced blizzard conditions over parts of the Upper Midwest and Great Lakes on March 16, attaining a pressure of 983 millibars (29.0 inHg) over Michigan at 12:00 UTC. Blizzard conditions began to wind down for the Upper Midwest and Great Lakes and the WPC issued its last storm summary at 03:00 UTC on March 17.

The storm intensified as it moved through Quebec, deepening to a pressure of 944 millibars (27.9 inHg) by 06:00 UTC on March 18 as it moved offshore into the Labrador Sea. Afterwards, the system weakened and made landfall in Greenland by 03:00 UTC on March 19.

== Preparations and impact ==
=== United States ===
Winter storm warnings and blizzard warnings were issued for a wide swath of the northern tier from Washington to the Upper Peninsula of Michigan, with the latter type being issued for most of the states of Iowa, Wisconsin, Minnesota, South Dakota and portions of northern Michigan. Ice storm warnings were issued for the northern Lower Peninsula of Michigan. Red flag warnings were issued for the southern Plains due to strong winds and dry air forecasted in the wake of the storm. Over 500,000 lost power across the United States. By the morning of March 16, 5,000 flights were cancelled from the day prior.

==== Pacific Northwest ====
Seattle, Washington received a rare period of snow on March 13, with as much as 1–2 inches (2.5–5.1 cm) falling as a result. Roadways such as Interstate 90 were closed but disruptions were minor. Hundreds of flights ended up being delayed at the Seattle-Tacoma International Airport. The airport set a snowfall record of 3 in (7.6 cm) and a rainfall record of 1.22 in (3.1 cm) for March 13. The Olympia Airport recorded 1.8 in (4.6 cm) of rain also setting a record that day. At higher elevations where heavier snow fell in the mountains, mountain passes were closed. Roughly 56 cm (22 in) of snow fell in the Snoqualmie Pass while around 107 cm (42 in) of snow was reported at the summit of Snoqualmie. I-90 in the Snoqualmie Pass closed due to multiple spinouts and crashes.

Windy conditions led to nearly 5,000 customers without power in the Treasure Valley area of Idaho. In Montana, heavy wet snow led to tree branches falling causing numerous power outages across the western parts of the state. 23 in (58 cm) of snow was recorded near Cooke City, Montana.

==== Upper Midwest ====
Minnesota declared a peacetime emergency on March 13, with Governor Tim Walz authorizing the Minnesota National Guard for emergency preparedness, where 12–18 inches (30–46 cm) of snow was forecasted in Minneapolis. Delta Air Lines cancelled numerous flights ahead of the storm from Minneapolis-St. Paul International Airport. Xcel Energy stated that they were ready to assist in recovery efforts and power restoration during the storm. The city of Duluth advised residents to stay off the roads, while snow crews were readied to be deployed starting at 2 a.m. on March 15. Minnesota State Patrol reported 464 crashes between March 13 at midnight to March 15, with 40 involving an injury and one fatal. Parts of southern Minnesota received over 1 foot (30 cm) of snow with Kellogg recording 25 inches (64 cm) of snow.

On March 14, Wisconsin Governor Tony Evers declared a state of emergency. The city of Marshfield declared a snow emergency in effect from March 15 to 16, and closed numerous public libraries and churches on March 15. Wausau set a daily snowfall record on March 15 with 23.4 in (59 cm) of snow recorded. The city also set a three-day snowfall record as well with 30.2 in (77 cm) of snow falling from March 14 to 16. Green Bay also set a daily record of 17.1 in (43 cm) of snow for March 15. A total of 26.6 in (68 cm) of snowfall was recorded at the Green Bay National Weather Service station, the second-highest on record only behind an early March 1888 storm. Several communities recorded 30 in (76 cm) of snow with 34 in (86 cm) reported in Mountain. I-94 in Jackson County closed after two semi trucks became stranded on March 15. By 5 a.m. on March 16, 13,256 customers lost power across southeast Wisconsin. The Wisconsin State Patrol reported over 90 crashes, 11 of which resulted in injuries.

The Michigan State Emergency Operations Center was activated by Governor Gretchen Whitmer on March 15. 140,000 customers lost power in the state due to the storm on March 16. The highest recorded storm-related snow total in the state came from Round Lake in the state's Upper Peninsula, which saw 54 in (140 cm). In areas mostly populated, Negaunee received 37.6 in (96 cm), Gwinn got 36 in (910 mm), and Menominee saw 34 in (86 cm). Meteorologists at the Marquette National Weather Service station (actually located in Negaunee Township) reported that the storm dumped 36.3 in (92 cm) of snow on their location over a two-day period; surpassing their previous two-day record total, set in 1997, by nearly 5 in (13 cm). Near Grayling, 0.28 in (7.1 mm) of freezing rain was recorded. Due to the snowfall, Governor Gretchen Whitmer declared a state of emergency for seven counties on March 17.

The blizzard brought dangerous road conditions to Iowa. Parts of I-80 and I-35 were closed due to crashes. The Iowa State Patrol responded to 99 crashes and assisted 299 motorists between March 15 and 16 at 9 a.m., totaling to 398 calls for service. Of the crashes, 86 resulted in damage, 12 in injuries, and one was fatal. 9 in (23 cm) of snow was recorded in Lowden. Freezing rain accumulations also occurred in the state with 0.33 in (8.4 mm) of freezing rain reported in Sioux Rapids.

A fatal crash occurred in Lancaster County due to whiteout conditions on March 15. The Nebraska State Patrol reported an additional five crashes. They had also assisted 43 motorists and six other responses by other agencies. Elsewhere in Nebraska, the windy conditions produced by the storm helped fuel fires in the state.

Heavy snow and strong winds caused parts of I-29 and I-90 to close in South Dakota. A number of car accidents were reported by first responders. A total of 13.5 in (34 cm) of snow was recorded near Spearfish. Further north in North Dakota, 10 in (25 cm) of snow was reported in Gladstone.

Prior to the snowfall, severe weather led to O'Hare International Airport and Midway International Airport to issue a ground stop on March 15. Flooding was reported in parts of Illinois due to heavy rainfall. Lanark recorded 8.5 in (22 cm) of snowfall.

==== Ohio Valley and Appalachians ====
A cold front attached to the low pressure in the Upper Midwest brought snow to many areas across the Ohio Valley and the Appalachians on the evening of March 16th, after plummeting the region by 55 °F (13 °C) in just 36 hours. Several counties in Ohio declared snow emergencies due to the winter weather, with accidents resulting in delays or road closures. Charleston saw roughly 5.2 in (13 cm) of snow, with many accidents occurring due to the weather. Meanwhile, Pittsburgh saw 6.3 in (16 cm) of snow, its second highest snow-event total of the winter season. This set the all-time record for snow accumulation amounts on a 60 °F (16 °C) day or higher for Pittsburgh, prompting school delays and closures the following Tuesday.

Additionally, strong winds occurred throughout the region, causing damages and widespread power outages. A gust of 60 mph (97 km/h) was recorded in Fort Wayne. By 9:30 p.m. on March 15, approximately 9,000 outages were reported across the state. Over 46,000 lost power in Kentucky due to the storm on March 15. Icy conditions led to crashes and the closure of roads on March 17. The Lexington Police Department reported a total of 277 crashes, 16 of which resulted in injuries. A peak of 7,700 lost power in East Tennessee on the morning of March 16, with snow resulting in school closures the following day.

==== South ====
Multiple tornado watches and warnings were issued across many states. A damaging squall line went through many Southern states.

Damaging winds from thunderstorms of over 60 mph (97 km/h) occurred in Missouri. Tree damage occurred in the state.

On the evening of March 15, over 50,000 lost power in Arkansas.

Winds blowing debris onto the road prompted I-35E in Denton to briefly close on March 15. The Java House Grand Prix of Arlington cancelled a concert, including Six Flags Over Texas being closed. Approximately 30,000 lost power in North Texas. The Dallas-Fort Worth International Airport saw flight delays. The Bullfrog Marina on Lake O' the Pines sustained heavy damage. Over 2,000 lost power in East Texas.

==== Mid-Atlantic ====
Maryland Governor Wes Moore declared a state of preparedness ahead of the severe weather on March 15. Early closures for March 16 were announced for several schools. Localized flooding occurred in Baltimore and wind damage was reported in parts of the state. Over 16,000 power outages were reported by Baltimore Gas and Electric by 11 p.m. on March 16.

Severe storms impacted Delaware. Roughly 6,000 Delaware Electric Cooperative customers lost power while Delmarva Power had 5,421 outages by 3:00 a.m. on March 17.

In northwestern Saylorsburg, Pennsylvania, 869 (Note: According to Met-Ed's official website)customers of Met-Ed reported a power outage early on March 16. A tree fell and killed a man while removing a different tree in Newton Square.

In New York, John F. Kennedy International Airport had a peak gust of 72 mph (116 km/h). Strong winds brought down trees in the state. A driver died in a crash after trying to swerve around a fallen tree and lost control in Mount Pleasant.

A peak gust of 71 mph (114 km/h) occurred in Newark, and a 74 mph (119 km/h) gust was recorded at Avalon. On the morning of March 17, almost 38,000 were reported to have lost power. NJ Transit suspended some rail lines due to downed trees.

==== New England ====
Severe weather led to many road closures in Connecticut. Almost 31,000 lost power by 7:45 a.m. on March 17. Several schools in the state had delays.

A total of nearly 15,000 costumers lost power in Rhode Island on March 17.

The Blue Hill Meteorological Observatory in Milton, Massachusetts recorded a peak gust of 81 mph (130 km/h). The Massachusetts Emergency Management Agency reported a peak of nearly 65,000 homes and businesses losing power at 6 a.m. on March 17. 44 flights were cancelled at the Logan International Airport on March 17.

Over 20,000 Green Mountain Power customers lost power in Vermont due to high winds.

Strong winds caused tree damage and power outages in New Hampshire. A peak of around 16,000 customers at 3:30 a.m. lost power across the state on March 17. A water level of 10.12 ft (3.08 m) was observed on the Pemigewasset River at Woodstock, attaining minor flood stage.

On the night of March 16, over 20,000 customers lost power in Maine. Flood watches and warnings were issued.

=== Canada ===
Orange winter storm warnings were issued for communities in central Ontario. Areas in southern and eastern Ontario were expected to see a mix of freezing rain and snow. Sudbury declared a significant weather event on March 15. The weather resulted in highways closing in northeastern Ontario. Manitoulin Island and areas in the French River reported small power outages on March 16. By March 17, around 20,000 Hydro One customers lost power in eastern Ontario. Two sports domes in Sudbury collapsed. The city received the highest snowfall since 1959 with 42.1 cm (16.6 in) of snow. Sault Ste. Marie reported 55 cm (22 in) of snow, the highest since December 2022.

Yellow and orange winter storm warnings were in effect for central and southern parts of Quebec. Winds gusts of 90 km/h (56 mph) were reported in large parts of the province, with some places reaching up to 120 km/h (75 mph). Trudeau Airport had a peak gust of 94 km/h (58 mph). The strong winds caused power outages, structural damages, and accidents. Around 315,000 Hydro-Québec customers did not have power just before 10 a.m. on March 17. A total of over 1 million people in Quebec lost power.

Special weather statements for heavy rain were in effect for Nova Scotia and New Brunswick. Yellow wind and rainfall warnings were issued for the two provinces. Rain and wind warnings were issued for parts of Newfoundland while parts of Labrador were under wind and flash freeze warnings. Over 15,000 across the Maritimes lost power on March 17. Bridges were closed and ferry crossings were cancelled. At 9:30 a.m., more than 28,000 power outages were reported across Nova Scotia. Over 8,000 lost power in New Brunswick while approximately 1,000 Maritime Electric customers in Prince Edward Island were without power at 10:30 a.m.

== Severe weather ==
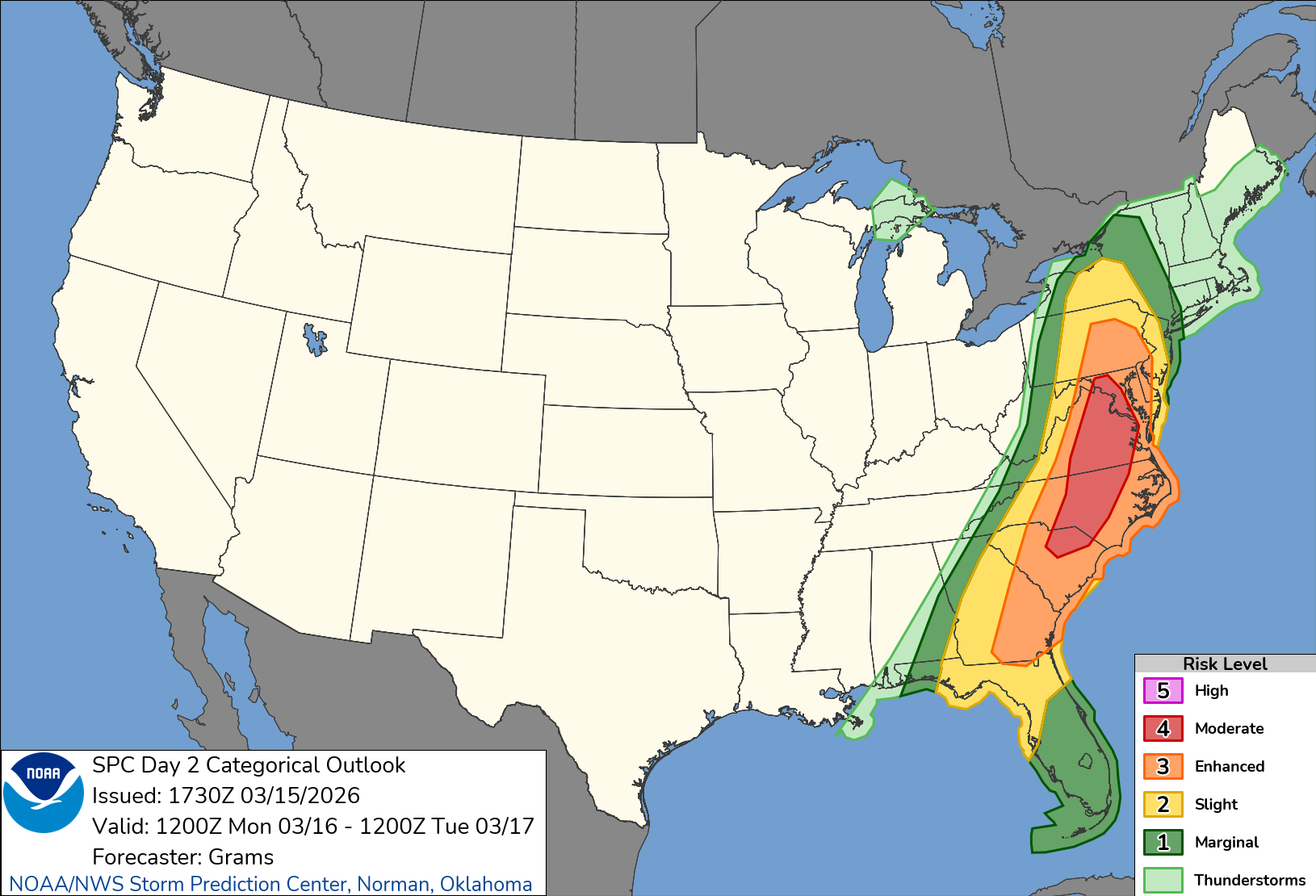
The Storm Prediction Center's 1730 UTC Day 2 Convective Outlook for March 15, 2026.

=== March 15 ===
On March 15, the Storm Prediction Center issued a Day 1 enhanced risk for severe weather for the risk of severe damaging wind and tornadoes in the Lower Mississippi Valley up to Illinois and Indiana, with a separate area of enhanced risk in Georgia and Alabama. A squall line was expected to form from the cold front of the cyclone, leading to a risk for damaging wind and tornadoes from embedded supercells. There was also an expected risk for discrete supercells ahead of the line in the Mississippi Valley, although the limited width of the warm sector limited their severity and number, and many were also overtaken by the cold front. Meanwhile, in the Southeast in Alabama and Georgia, there was a separate risk for longer-living discrete supercells further ahead of the line.

=== March 16 ===
A Day 1 moderate risk was issued for March 16 from northern South Carolina to southern Maryland, driven by a risk for tornadoes and damaging winds from a squall line.

=== Confirmed tornadoes ===
Confirmed tornadoes by Enhanced Fujita rating
EFU	EF0	EF1	EF2	EF3	EF4	EF5	Total
1	23	32	0	0	0	0	56

==== March 15 event ====
List of confirmed tornadoes – Sunday, March 15, 2026 (Note: All dates are based on the local time zone where the tornado touched down; however, all times are in Coordinated Universal Time for consistency.)
EF#	Location	County / Parish	State	Start Coord.	Time (UTC)	Path length	Max width
EF1	NNE of Cabool	Texas	MO	37.1764°N 92.0691°W	20:37–20:39	0.26 mi (0.42 km)	100 yd (91 m)
EF1	Several trees were uprooted and two barns were destroyed.						
EF0	SE of Sterling	Howell	MO	37.0245°N 92.0045°W	20:48–20:52	1.95 mi (3.14 km)	75 yd (69 m)
EF0	This high-end EF0 lifted a donkey barn and snapped or uprooted multiple trees.						
EF1	Eunice	Texas	MO	37.2491°N 91.778°W	20:55–20:59	2.43 mi (3.91 km)	100 yd (91 m)
EF1	A tornado damaged the roof of a barn and uprooted or snapped numerous trees.						
EF0	NNW of Hartshorn	Texas	MO	37.3106°N 91.7006°W	21:00–21:02	0.85 mi (1.37 km)	100 yd (91 m)
EF0	Numerous large trees were uprooted and some trees were snapped.						
EF1	NNE of Hartshorn to SW of Akers	Shannon	MO	37.3227°N 91.6278°W	21:03–21:04	1.43 mi (2.30 km)	250 yd (230 m)
EF1	The roof of a mobile home was torn off and large trees were snapped or uprooted.						
EF0	Southern Summersville	Texas, Shannon	MO	37.1696°N 91.6585°W	21:08–21:12	0.47 mi (0.76 km)	75 yd (69 m)
EF0	This tornado touched down south of Summersville, where multiple trees and large limbs were snapped or uprooted along its path. As it moved across the area and into extreme southern portion of Summersville, several structures sustained roof damage, including a barn that lost part of its roof and a building that had a metal roof torn off and blown away. Other nearby buildings experienced shingle damage before the tornado dissipated.						
EF1	N of Staunton to Mount Olive	Macoupin, Montgomery	IL	39.0483°N 89.7879°W	22:29–22:36	6.32 mi (10.17 km)	300 yd (270 m)
EF1	This tornado touched down, uprooting trees and causing minor damage to barns. The tornado then crossed I-55 destroying a barn and uprooting more trees. As the tornado entered Mount Olive it caused roof damage to multiple structures and additional tree damage before dissipating.						
EF0	E of Ames to WNW of Baldwin	Monroe, Randolph	IL	38.1455°N 90.0505°W	22:35–22:43	8.71 mi (14.02 km)	160 yd (150 m)
EF0	The roofs of several farm outbuildings were damaged and one large outbuilding was collapsed. A church's roof was torn off and several trees were damaged as well.						
EF1	NW of Walshville to W of Hillsboro	Montgomery	IL	39.1019°N 89.6611°W	22:38–22:43	7.06 mi (11.36 km)	300 yd (270 m)
EF1	A tornado snapped wooden power poles, inflicted minor damage to farm outbuildings, and snapped or uprooted trees.						
EF1	Minturn to WNW of Sedgwick	Lawrence	AR	35.9618°N 91.0887°W	22:43–22:53	10.41 mi (16.75 km)	200 yd (180 m)
EF1	This tornado touched down, damaging several power poles before moving northeast across farmland where additional power infrastructure was impacted. As it entered Minturn, numerous trees were snapped or uprooted and a few mobile homes sustained roof damage. The tornado then crossed AR 367, uprooting more trees before continuing across open farmland where it caused minor roof damage to a barn. Farther along its path, additional trees and power poles were downed on both sides of I-57 before the tornado weakened and lifted.						
EF1	Northeastern Hillsboro to W of Irving	Montgomery	IL	39.1726°N 89.4732°W	22:47–22:51	3.64 mi (5.86 km)	300 yd (270 m)
EF1	This tornado caused heavy damage to a barn and uprooted trees.						
EF1	New Athens	St. Clair	IL	38.3181°N 89.8759°W	22:47–22:48	0.58 mi (0.93 km)	225 yd (206 m)
EF1	This tornado touched down in New Athens, initially breaking windows at a local shop and damaging the roof of a warehouse. It then tracked east-northeast through town, causing varying degrees of roof damage to multiple homes before weakening and dissipating just east of the Canadian National Railway.						
EF1	Lodi	Wayne	MO	37.2585°N 90.4522°W	22:51–22:53	1.65 mi (2.66 km)	125 yd (114 m)
EF1	This brief tornado damaged several trees and barns in and east of Lodi.						
EF1	SW of Witt to Colaton to Western Nokomis	Montgomery	IL	39.2366°N 89.4014°W	22:55–23:02	7.84 mi (12.62 km)	500 yd (460 m)
EF1	The tornado began by blowing over a farm auger and lofted debris nearly a half mile before striking Witt, where it damaged multiple roofs and trees and carried away a carport. It continued along IL 16 into Coalton, where it nearly completely removed the roof of a mobile home. The tornado then turned north and entered the western portions of Nokomis, where damage was primarily to trees, although an outdoor football scoreboard was blown over and portions of the Nokomis High School roof were torn away. The tornado lifted on the northwest side of the city.						
EF0	N of Walnut Corner to NNE of Light	Greene	AR	36.0657°N 90.8137°W	22:58–23:03	4.48 mi (7.21 km)	100 yd (91 m)
EF0	A tornado began just south of US 412, where it damaged a grain bin and snapped a few trees before continuing east-northeast and damaging a camper. As it continued to moved along, it caused damage to an outbuilding and produced additional tree damage at a nearby intersection. The tornado then continued a short distance farther, causing a few more instances of tree damage before lifting shortly afterward.						
EFU	SW of Stuttgart	Arkansas	AR	34.4183°N 91.6303°W	23:02–23:09	2.36 mi (3.80 km)	50 yd (46 m)
EFU	Multiple storm spotters recorded a tornado that occurred in an open field, causing no damage.						
EF1	Eastern Nokomis to Rosamond to Pana	Montgomery, Christian	IL	39.3°N 89.2826°W	23:02–23:16	13.13 mi (21.13 km)	225 yd (206 m)
EF1	A tornado began on the east side of Nokomis, producing widespread tree damage before tracking northeast along IL 16 past Ohlman, where older farm outbuildings were collapsed and debris was lofted well downstream. After entering Christian County, the tornado caused additional roof and tree damage in Rosamond before curving east into Pana, where several large trees were snapped and uprooted before it dissipated.						
EF0	Beech Grove	Greene	AR	36.1789°N 90.6211°W	23:07–23:10	2.19 mi (3.52 km)	100 yd (91 m)
EF0	A weak tornado began along AR 34, where it damaged the roof of a metal outbuilding and a nearby residence while also causing some tree branch damage. As it moved east, it produced additional tree damage and caused minor damage to a barn before entering a wooded area and dissipating.						
EF1	Southern Lafe	Greene	AR	36.1873°N 90.5438°W	23:12–23:15	2.99 mi (4.81 km)	150 yd (140 m)
EF1	A tornado touched down southwest of Lafe in a wooded area, where it initially caused tree damage before continuing northeast and snapping or damaging additional trees. As it moved along, a residence sustained minor roof damage and a small barn was destroyed before the tornado approached AR 135. After crossing AR 135, it damaged another barn just south of AR 34, with additional tree damage noted along the path. The tornado then continued a short distance into a wooded area north of AR 34 before lifting.						
EF1	Assumption	Christian	IL	39.5144°N 89.0615°W	23:18–23:20	1.41 mi (2.27 km)	80 yd (73 m)
EF1	A tornado touched down just southwest of Assumption and moved into town, where it uprooted and snapped numerous trees and knocked over a couple of power poles. As it continued through the town center, additional trees were snapped and roofing material was torn from a downtown building and blown into a nearby alley. The tornado then moved northeast out of town, causing a few more trees to be damaged before dissipating shortly before reaching US 51.						
EF1	WSW of Sedgewickville to W of Daisy	Bollinger, Cape Girardeau	MO	37.5018°N 89.9443°W	23:19–23:27	7.81 mi (12.57 km)	100 yd (91 m)
EF1	This tornado began just north of Route 72, where several barns and outbuildings were damaged, including structures that lost roofs, had walls blown over, and one that was completely destroyed. Numerous trees were uprooted and many large limbs were broken as the tornado moved east. After crossing into Cape Girardeau County, the tornado flipped a livestock trailer before continuing east, where additional tree damage occurred before the tornado lifted.						
EF1	NW of Rector	Clay	AR	36.2877°N 90.3532°W	23:24–23:26	2.04 mi (3.28 km)	130 yd (120 m)
EF1	A tornado touched down and initially caused tree damage by snapping and damaging several trees. As it moved northeast, it produced minor roof damage to a nearby residence and lifted portions of the roof on a metal outbuilding. The tornado then continued a short distance, causing additional tree damage before lifting.						
EF1	N of Ferrin to NW of Sandoval	Clinton	IL	38.6381°N 89.2268°W	23:29–23:31	4.18 mi (6.73 km)	50 yd (46 m)
EF1	A grain bin, a farm outbuilding and trees were all damaged.						
EF1	W of Shawneetown	Cape Girardeau	MO	37.5446°N 89.7148°W	23:32–23:33	0.5 mi (0.80 km)	50 yd (46 m)
EF1	A few mobile homes suffered significant damage to their roofs, including one mobile home which was shifted off of its foundation. A couple outbuildings were also damaged.						
EF0	NW of Bethany	Moultrie	IL	39.6518°N 88.7927°W	23:37–23:40	2.04 mi (3.28 km)	50 yd (46 m)
EF0	An outbuilding was destroyed and trees were damaged.						
EF1	W of Lovington to SSW of Hammond	Moultrie	IL	39.7221°N 88.6803°W	23:42–23:48	5.3 mi (8.5 km)	50 yd (46 m)
EF1	A power pole was snapped, a tree was uprooted, a home and an outbuilding suffered roof damage and several large tree branches were snapped.						
EF0	E of Baird to Clarkton to W of Gideon	Dunklin, New Madrid	MO	36.4497°N 89.993°W	23:44–23:50	2.94 mi (4.73 km)	75 yd (69 m)
EF0	A tornado touched down just east of Baird, where it overturned multiple center pivot irrigation systems before moving into Clarkton and causing roof damage to a state school, a convenience store, and several homes just south of Route 162. As it continued east, an outbuilding sustained damage and debris was scattered into a nearby field. The tornado then weakened and lifted shortly before reaching Gideon.						
EF1	Grand Tower	Jackson	IL	37.63°N 89.5033°W	23:46–23:47	0.25 mi (0.40 km)	100 yd (91 m)
EF1	This brief tornado damaged roofs and awnings in Grand Tower. A few trees were uprooted and several tree branches were snapped as well.						
EF0	SE of Arthur to W of Chesterville	Douglas	IL	39.6899°N 88.4493°W	23:54–23:57	2 mi (3.2 km)	80 yd (73 m)
EF0	This high-end EF0 tornado damaged several outbuildings, one of which was lofted and tossed into a field, destroying it. Tree damage also occurred.						
EF0	Southern Reeds Station	Jackson	IL	37.7712°N 89.1619°W	00:02–00:03	0.25 mi (0.40 km)	50 yd (46 m)
EF0	A wooden fence was damaged and several trees were snapped.						
EF1	NE of Bourbon to SW of Tuscola	Douglas	IL	39.761°N 88.3604°W	00:03–00:06	2.24 mi (3.60 km)	70 yd (64 m)
EF1	Numerous large pine trees were snapped and an outbuilding was damaged.						
EF1	SE of Ficklin to Tuscola to Northern Villa Grove	Douglas	IL	39.78°N 88.3254°W	00:06–00:16	11.34 mi (18.25 km)	70 yd (64 m)
EF1	This tornado snapped branches off of trees before it crossed US 36 into Tuscola, where it would blow down fences and destroy a carport. The tornado later snapped power poles near Villa Grove, lifting shortly afterwards.						
EF0	Olney	Richland	IL	38.7288°N 88.1051°W	01:05–05:07	1.91 mi (3.07 km)	40 yd (37 m)
EF0	A weak tornado caused damage to trees and fencing throughout Olney.						
EF1	NNE of Kossuth to WSW of Corinth	Alcorn	MS	34.8912°N 88.6302°W	01:17–01:20	2.5 mi (4.0 km)	100 yd (91 m)
EF1	A tornado snapped and uprooted several trees, damaged power lines, fences, and caused minor roof damage to structures west of MS 2 before causing its most intense damage at a church along the highway, where the roof was partially removed and a few windows were blown out. It then moved east of the highway and dissipated over open fields.						
EF0	Northwestern Clarksville	Montgomery	TN	36.5999°N 87.4486°W	02:35–02:40	4.82 mi (7.76 km)	200 yd (180 m)
EF0	This weak tornado began in a neighborhood in Fort Campbell, where it removed shingles from roofs and snapped small tree limbs before moving east toward US 41, where it blew down an overhang at a car wash. Continuing northeast through additional neighborhoods and across Outlaw Airfield, the tornado caused scattered damage including downed trees, snapped branches, damaged fences, and minor impacts to homes such as shingle loss, siding damage, and bent metal fascia. After crossing the airfield, it uprooted a few trees on a nearby farm and continued into another residential area, producing additional minor roof and structural damage along with more snapped limbs. The tornado then moved toward the Tennessee-Kentucky state line and dissipated in an open field south of I-24, with no further damage observed beyond that point.						
EF0	W of Lewisburg	Logan	KY	36.9818°N 86.9762°W	02:45–02:46	0.78 mi (1.26 km)	40 yd (37 m)
EF0	A tornado began by uprooting and snapping several large trees before continuing northeast and causing additional tree damage. As it moved east, more trees were uprooted and a nearby residence sustained minor shingle damage. Farther along the path, the tornado intensified slightly, tearing the roof from a storage outbuilding and scattering debris, including wood planks that were driven into the ground in multiple directions. Additional trees were damaged beyond this point before the tornado rapidly weakened and lifted.						
EF0	SSW of Dimple to W of Needmore	Butler	KY	37.0759°N 86.7391°W	02:59–03:04	4.64 mi (7.47 km)	50 yd (46 m)
EF0	A tornado first caused damage south of Dimple where it lifted the roof off a storage outbuilding and lofted it into nearby trees while also snapping and twisting trees in multiple directions. As it moved northeast, it crossed KY 79, where additional tree damage occurred on either side of the route. Continuing onward, the tornado damaged several mobile homes, destroying a shed that was carried into a nearby field, shifting one mobile home on its foundation, and tearing the roof from another and depositing it roughly a 0.1 miles (0.16 km). The tornado then struck a farm where another outbuilding lost its roof, which was split apart and scattered in different directions over nearby equipment and fields, while isolated trees were also uprooted. After crossing a creek, the tornado snapped several large tree branches before the damage quickly diminished and the tornado lifted.						
EF1	N of Caneyville to NNE of Hardin Springs	Grayson, Breckinridge, Hardin	KY	37.4608°N 86.4704°W	03:04–03:22	17.22 mi (27.71 km)	300 yd (270 m)
EF1	This tornado began near Caneyville, where it produced tree damage near KY 79 before moving northeast and causing damage to farmsteads, including multiple outbuildings with roofs peeled off and debris driven into nearby homes, along with minor roof damage to residences. As it continued, it crossed KY 54, producing additional tree damage and destroying rooftops of farm structures, with debris lofted into nearby trees and fields. Farther along, the tornado intensified and caused complete destruction of several hilltop outbuildings, drove wood planks into the ground, and produced significant tree damage. The tornado then continued northeast, uprooting more trees and crossing Rough River Lake multiple times, causing additional structural and tree damage along the Grayson-Breckinridge county line. Near the end of its path, it snapped several branches off of trees before lifting.						
EF1	W of Riverside	Warren	KY	37.1497°N 86.5781°W	03:06–03:09	2.22 mi (3.57 km)	40 yd (37 m)
EF1	A tornado first caused damage in a rural area where a residence had minor shingle damage while several farm outbuildings sustained significant roof damage, including one barn whose roof was lofted away and debris such as wooden planks was driven into the ground. As it moved northeast, additional outbuildings on higher terrain lost roofing. The tornado then impacted another residence, lifting a carport awning while nearby trees were damaged. Continuing northeast, several trees were snapped and a barn lost roofing material and was shifted and left leaning, with its debris scattered. Farther along, the tornado caused more substantial damage at another property where a home and outbuildings were damaged, a barn was destroyed, and a zero-turn mower was lifted and placed onto a shed roof, while debris was thrown into a nearby field and wood pieces were embedded in the ground. The tornado then moved into open land where it ultimately ended.						
EF1	Mount Pleasant to Columbia to S of Spring Hill	Maury	TN	35.5591°N 87.1848°W	03:06–03:25	16.28 mi (26.20 km)	500 yd (460 m)
EF1	This tornado began along US 43 in Mount Pleasant, where numerous trees were uprooted or had limbs broken and several homes and barns lost sections of metal roofing. As it moved northeast, additional tree damage occurred before the tornado entered Columbia, where neighborhoods and the campus of Columbia State Community College experienced frequent tree damage along with minor structural damage to homes including siding, shingles, and metal fascia. On the college campus, one building sustained roof damage and fencing around the ball fields was damaged. Continuing northeast into an industrial area near the Duck River, the tornado uprooted or snapped many trees while several buildings lost metal roofing and one large metal building had part of its south-facing wall collapse. The tornado then moved back into residential areas where scattered trees were downed and additional minor damage to roofing and siding occurred before the tornado weakened and dissipated just before reaching Spring Hill.						
EF1	E of Constantine	Hardin	KY	37.6528°N 86.2113°W	03:24–03:28	3.85 mi (6.20 km)	100 yd (91 m)
EF1	A tornado began in a wooded area south of Garfield and quickly produced significant damage to a residence, where part of the roof was removed above the garage and living space, debris was driven back into the structure, and wood pieces were impaled into the ground, with mud splatter. As it moved north-northeast, it caused additional damage through forested areas and into a cemetery, then produced further structural damage to buildings along its path. The tornado continued through wooded terrain, leaving a visible damage path before it dissipated.						
EF1	WNW of Howe Valley to W of Radcliff	Hardin, Meade	KY	37.7103°N 86.1569°W	03:29–03:42	13.05 mi (21.00 km)	200 yd (180 m)
EF1	A tornado started in a heavily forested area, where initial damage was limited to trees before it crossed into open areas and caused its first structural impacts by damaging barns, including one that lost its roof which was thrown into a nearby wooded area. As it continued, additional structural damage occurred before it crossed into Meade County, where a large tree fell onto a house. The tornado then made a leftward turn to the north and caused further damage to buildings and trees near KY 313, followed by additional tree and minor residential damage. Continuing across open fields, it caused significant damage to a farm where multiple buildings were heavily impacted and roofs were lofted across the area before the tornado dissipated just before tracking into Fort Knox.						
EF1	Lexington, AL to Southern Minor Hill, TN	Lauderdale (AL), Lawrence (TN), Giles (TN)	AL, TN	34.9671°N 87.3831°W	03:48–04:04	14.53 mi (23.38 km)	400 yd (370 m)
EF1	This tornado touched down in an open field south of SR 64 in Lexington, where it slid an outdoor structure off its cinder blocks while snapping support posts and uprooting trees. As it moved northeast toward the city center, it caused minor roof damage to several buildings before uprooting numerous trees along SR 64. Continuing northeast, the tornado crossed a county highway, snapping additional trees, damaging home siding, collapsing small open structures, and blowing in a garage door as it moved toward the Alabama-Tennessee state line. After crossing into Tennessee, the tornado intensified as it struck Bonnertown, where many residences were damaged, several homes were heavily damaged, manufactured homes were shifted off their piers, and a couple of mobile homes were lofted or slid while remaining largely intact. Additional damage included removed shingles, missing awnings, carports thrown, and trees falling onto structures, while several farm outbuildings were destroyed and many trees were snapped or uprooted. Farther along the path, the tornado destroyed the roof of a chicken farm and continued causing widespread tree damage before weakening, where additional trees were downed, a few structures were damaged by falling trees, and some metal farm outbuildings collapsed before the tornado dissipated in southern Minor Hill.						

==== March 16 event ====
List of confirmed tornadoes – Monday, March 16, 2026
EF#	Location	County / Parish	State	Start Coord.	Time (UTC)	Path length	Max width
EF1	SW of Albany	Clinton	KY	36.6623°N 85.1596°W	05:35–05:37	1.26 mi (2.03 km)	200 yd (180 m)
EF1	This tornado first caused damage to a line of cedar trees, with treetops and branches twisted and thrown in multiple directions. As it moved uphill to a nearby farmstead, it intensified and completely shifted a barn off its foundation while lofting roof material into nearby fields. A nearby residence also sustained awning damage and wood planks were driven into the ground. Continuing northeast, the tornado snapped additional trees and leveled another barn while producing a clear convergent pattern in the damage. Farther along, a residence sustained roof and siding damage and the debris field extended up to US 127, beyond which no further damage was observed as the tornado dissipated.						
EF1	NW of Waynesboro	Wayne	MS	31.7397°N 88.7375°W	06:43–06:46	2.01 mi (3.23 km)	200 yd (180 m)
EF1	Numerous trees were uprooted and a few older outbuildings were either damaged or destroyed.						
EF0	S of Snapfinger	DeKalb	GA	33.6781°N 84.2108°W	10:11–10:15	2.77 mi (4.46 km)	135 yd (123 m)
EF0	A weak tornado downed, snapped and uprooted several of trees, one of which trapped a person inside their home.						
EF0	NW of Sunset Village	Upson	GA	32.9226°N 84.4624°W	11:00–11:03	3.02 mi (4.86 km)	360 yd (330 m)
EF0	This tornado began by snapping a few small pine trees before moving east and intensifying as it crossed a creek, where approximately twenty to thirty trees were knocked down or uprooted across farmland. Continuing along its path, it damaged a small outbuilding and produced additional tree damage before approaching SR 74, where more trees were damaged and a nearby home sustained minor structural impacts. The tornado then crossed another creek and uprooted more trees before continuing east, causing minor damage to trees and a small outbuilding, and then lifted.						
EF0	SSE of Mars Hill	Madison	NC	35.806°N 82.539°W	11:11–11:12	0.44 mi (0.71 km)	50 yd (46 m)
EF0	Several tree branches were snapped and a few trees were uprooted on either side of I-26.						
EF0	E of Mars Hill	Madison	NC	35.826°N 82.485°W	11:15–11:18	2.18 mi (3.51 km)	50 yd (46 m)
EF0	Numerous trees were downed, snapped or uprooted.						
EF0	SW of Yatesville	Upson	GA	32.8964°N 84.1947°W	11:20–11:26	1.65 mi (2.66 km)	100 yd (91 m)
EF0	A few trees were uprooted and multiple trees were snapped.						
EF0	Macon	Bibb	GA	32.8585°N 83.678°W	11:58–12:05	1.94 mi (3.12 km)	320 yd (290 m)
EF0	This tornado developed in a residential area north of Payne within Macon, where it uprooted trees and caused minor damage to siding, carports, and gutters as it moved east-northeast through nearby neighborhoods. Several trees fell onto homes and vehicles, and a U-Haul truck was overturned, while scattered leaf debris and snapped tree limbs marked the path. The tornado continued intermittently until reaching the Ocmulgee River just east of I-75, where it dissipated and no further damage was observed.						
EF0	Charlotte	Mecklenburg	NC	35.252°N 80.827°W	13:39–13:42	1.44 mi (2.32 km)	25 yd (23 m)
EF0	A tornado touched down in a residential area where several small trees were snapped before it moved northeast and snapped additional large tree limbs. As it strengthened, the tornado peeled sheet metal back from a large industrial building and removed a significant section of roofing from a nearby warehouse while snapping several large pine trees behind the structure. The tornado then weakened as it moved into another residential area, where only a few small limbs were downed before the tornado dissipated.						
EF0	Northeastern Martinsville	City of Martinsville	VA	36.6932°N 79.8604°W	14:42–14:45	0.53 mi (0.85 km)	125 yd (114 m)
EF0	This tornado blew down two power poles and several trees were either snapped or uprooted. This is the first tornado to touch down in Martinsville since the NOAA started keeping track in 1950.						
EF0	W of New Windsor	Carroll	MD	39.5361°N 77.1298°W	16:02–16:05	1.68 mi (2.70 km)	150 yd (140 m)
EF0	A tornado touched down, initially snapping a small cluster of trees before moving northeast across open fields where it lifted and rolled part of an irrigation system about 100 feet (30 m). As it continued, it crossed MD 75 and MD 84, where its strongest damage occurred, toppling a couple dozen trees, shearing the tops off large pines, downing a power pole onto lines that briefly trapped a motorist, and causing near-total roof collapse of a nearby outbuilding. After this, the tornado weakened, snapping a few more tree tops northeast of MD 84 before the damage quickly ended and the tornado dissipated.						
EF1	SSE of Ridgley	Caroline	MD	38.9086°N 75.8742°W	02:26–02:29	0.9 mi (1.4 km)	250 yd (230 m)
EF1	A tornado began just east of MD 404, where it first caused minor roof damage to a residence while a nearby barn was completely destroyed with its roof blown off and walls collapsed, sending debris over a quarter mile into open fields. The tornado also flipped a horse trailer multiple times across a yard while also blowing out several windows of the home. As it moved east, the tornado produced significant tree damage, uprooting multiple large trees and snapping large branches. Continuing farther along its path, additional large branches were broken in a wooded area before a heavier section of tree damage occurred with several trees being snapped or uprooted. The tornado dissipated shortly afterwards.						
EF1	SW of Frederica	Kent	DE	38.9841°N 75.4940°W	02:48–02:49	0.7 mi (1.1 km)	75 yd (69 m)
EF1	Several trees were snapped or uprooted, one of which fell onto a shed, destroying it.						

== See also ==
- Tornado outbreak of March 13–16, 2025
- Tornado outbreak of April 14–16, 2011
- Tornado outbreak of February 23–24, 2016
- April 2018 North American storm complex
- List of United States tornadoes from January to March 2026
- List of regional snowfall index category 5 winter storms
