= U.S. Route 63 in Arkansas =

Section of U.S. Highway in Arkansas, United States

U.S. Highway 63
- US 63 highlighted in red

Route information
- Maintained by ArDOT
- Length: 340.0 mi (547.2 km)

Major junctions
- South end: US 63 / US 167 at the Louisiana state line in Junction City
- I-530 / US 65 / US 79 / AR 463 in Pine Bluff; US 70 in Hazen; I-40 / AR 11 in Hazen; I-40 / US 49 in Brinkley; I-555 / US 49 / US 78 in Jonesboro; I-57 / US 67 / US 412 in Hoxie; US 412 near Walnut Ridge; US 62 in Imboden
- North end: US 63 at the Missouri state line in Mammoth Spring

Location
- Country: United States
- State: Arkansas
- Counties: Union, Bradley, Cleveland, Jefferson, Arkansas, Prairie, Monroe, Woodruff, Cross, Poinsett, Craighead, Greene, Lawrence, Sharp, Fulton

Highway system
- United States Numbered Highway System; List; Special; Divided; Arkansas Highway System; Interstate; US; State; Business; Spurs; Suffixed; Scenic; Heritage
← US 62	→ US 64

U.S. Route 63 (US 63) is a north-south U.S. highway that begins in Ruston, LA. In the US state of Arkansas the highway enters the state from Louisiana concurrent with US 167 in Junction City. The highway runs north through the eastern part of the state, serving rural areas of South Arkansas and the Arkansas Delta, as well as Pine Bluff and Jonesboro. The highway exits the state at Mammoth Spring traveling into Missouri.

== Route description ==
U.S. 63 enters into Arkansas from Louisiana concurrent with US 167 in Junction City. Just a few miles into the state, the two highways run on the eastern edge of El Dorado as an expressway. US 167 splits here, traveling towards Hampton. US 63 bypasses the town of Warren, crossing US 270. US 63 passes through the rural Cleveland County, then enters into Jefferson County.

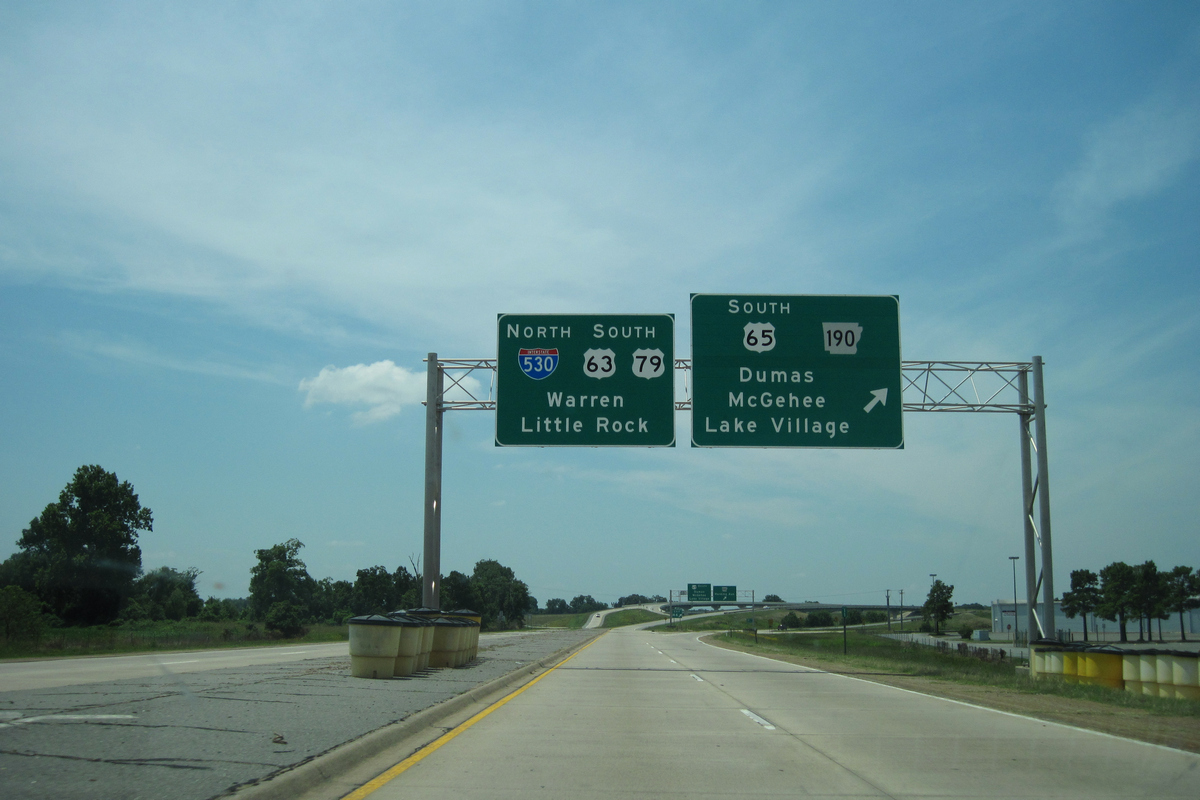
US 63 at the southern terminus of I-530 in Pine Bluff

In Jefferson County, US 63 serves the city of Pine Bluff. US 63 bypasses the city, running on the last 3 miles of I-530. Also in Pine Bluff, the highway overlaps with US 65 and US 79. US 63 runs northeast with US 79 until Stuttgart, where the highway runs north to Hazen. Just north of Hazen, US 63 overlaps with I-40 to Brinkley. In Brinkley, US 63 begins an overlap with US 49 north to Jonesboro. US 63 leaves US 49 and follows I-555 until I-555 terminates, together serving as a bypass for southern Jonesboro. In Hoxie, US 63 intersects with I-57/US 67. Northwest of here near Portia the highway overlaps with US 412.

In Imboden, US 62 joins this overlap. In Hardy, US 63 leaves the two highways. In Mammoth Spring, US 63 crosses into Missouri, traveling to West Plains.

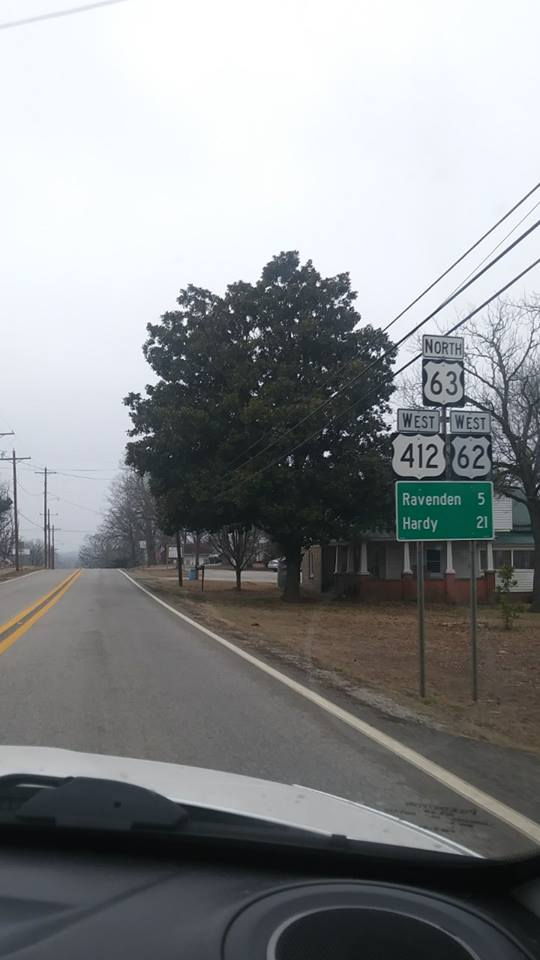
US Highway 62 joins US 63 and 412 in Imboden

== History ==
Portions of U.S. 63 in northern Arkansas have their origins in the work of the Ozark Trails Association, which established a network of roads in northern Arkansas and southern Missouri beginning in the 1910s. A portion of roadway was mapped out in Arkansas between Mammoth Spring and Memphis, Tennessee, and built c. 1918–22. This roadway was eventually designated Highway A-7, and was later designated U.S. 63. Some of the original infrastructure of this early construction has survived the 1927 Mississippi flood and the realignment of U.S. 63 in 1967. Northwest of Tyronza, Old U.S. 63 runs for about 1 1/4 miles of original concrete pavement; it was listed on the National Register of Historic Places in 2009. Four bridges built in the 1920s (three before the 1927 flood and one after, are also on the National Register; three southeast of Marked Tree, and one southeast of Tyronza.

On March 11, 2016, Interstate 555 (I-555) was dedicated after a new resolution passed in December 2015 allowing farm equipment to use the roadway when it became an interstate.

In April 2019, ArDOT submitted an application to AASHTO to reroute US 63 concurrent with US 49 between Brinkley and Jonesboro, eliminating the concurrencies with I-55 and I-555, and part of the concurrency with I-40. The rerouting took effect in 2021. However, a small section of US 63 in Jonesboro was redesignated as I-555 on November 23 of the same year, making US 63 partly concurrent with I-555 again.

== Major intersections ==
County	Location	mi	km	Exit	Destinations	Notes
Union	Junction City	0.0	0.0		US 63 south / US 167 south – Ruston	Continuation into Louisiana
Union		10.4	16.7		AR 7 south – Lockhart, LA	Southern end of AR 7 concurrency
Union	El Dorado	14.1	22.7		US 82 / AR 15 south – Magnolia, Crossett, South Arkansas Regional Airport	Exit 22 on US 82
Union	El Dorado	15.0	24.1	15	US 82B / US 167B north (Hillsboro Street)	Interchange
Union	El Dorado	16.2	26.1	16	US 167 north (AR 7 north) – Fordyce, Camden	Northern end of US 167/AR 7 concurrency
Union	Old Union	22.5	36.2		AR 129 south (Lawson Road) – Lawson	
Union		33.2	53.4		AR 275 south – Strong	
Bradley		36.4	58.6		AR 600 – Moro Bay State Park	
Bradley		48.9	78.7		AR 160 west – Jersey	Southern end of AR 160 concurrency
Bradley	Hermitage	52.7	84.8		US 63B north / AR 160 east – Hermitage, Ingalls	Northern end of AR 160 concurrency
Bradley	Hermitage	53.4	85.9		US 63B south – Hermitage	
Bradley	Carmel	62.2	100.1		AR 8 east – Johnsville	Southern end of AR 8 concurrency
Bradley		64.1	103.2		AR 980 – Airport	
Bradley	Warren	65.4	105.3		US 278 – Hampton, Monticello	
Bradley	Warren	65.9	106.1		US 63B north	
Bradley	Warren	66.9	107.7		US 278B	
Bradley	Warren	68.4	110.1		AR 8 west – Fordyce	Northern end of AR 8 concurrency
Bradley	Warren	69.0	111.0		US 63B south / AR 189 south – Monticello	
Cleveland	Rye	74.8	120.4		AR 35 south – Monticello, Lake Monticello	Southern end of AR 35 concurrency
Cleveland	Pansy				AR 11 north / AR 35 north – Rison, Star City	Northern end of AR 35 concurrency
Cleveland	Calmer				AR 114 west – Rison	Southern end of AR 114 concurrency
Cleveland	Calmer				AR 114 east – Star City	Northern end of AR 114 concurrency
Jefferson					AR 54 east – Glendale	Southern end of AR 54 concurrency
Jefferson	Pinebergen				AR 54 west	Northern end of AR 54 concurrency
Jefferson	Pine Bluff			43	I-530 north (US 65 north / US 79 south) / AR 463 north – Little Rock	Southern end of I-530/US 65/US 79 concurrency
Jefferson				44	AR 530 south – Star City, Monticello	Future I-530 south
Jefferson	Pine Bluff			46	US 65 south (US 425 south) / AR 190 west (Harding Avenue) – Dumas, McGehee, Lake Village	Northern end of US 65 concurrency; exit number not signed northbound
Jefferson	Pine Bluff			I-530 ends, US 65B begins		
Jefferson	Pine Bluff				US 65B north	Northern end of US 65B concurrency
Jefferson					AR 81 south	
Jefferson	Altheimer				US 79B to US 65 north – Pine Bluff, UAPB	
Jefferson	Altheimer				US 79B south to AR 88 – Reydell, Altheimer Business District	
Arkansas	Humphrey				AR 13 north – Humnoke, Carlisle	
Arkansas					AR 152 east – Bayou Meto WMA	
Arkansas					AR 343 south	
Arkansas					US 79B north – De Witt, Phillips Community College	
Arkansas	Stuttgart				US 79 north (West Michigan Street) – Clarendon, Arkansas County Agricultural Museum	Northern end of US 79 concurrency
Arkansas					US 165 – England, Little Rock, De Witt, Clarendon	
Prairie					AR 980 – Airport	
Prairie					AR 86 west – Slovak	Southern end of AR 86 concurrency
Prairie	Siedenstricker				AR 86 east – Tollville	Northern end of AR 86 concurrency
Prairie	Hazen				US 70 east – DeValls Bluff, Brinkley	Southern end of US 70 concurrency
Prairie	Hazen				US 70 west – Hazen Business District	Northern end of US 70 concurrency
Prairie	Hazen			193	I-40 west / AR 11 north – Little Rock, Des Arc, Lower White River Museum State Park	Southern end of I-40 concurrency
Prairie				202	AR 33 – Biscoe, De Valls Bluff	
Monroe	Brinkley			216	I-40 east / US 49 south / AR 17 to US 70 – Memphis, Brinkley, Clarendon, Helena–West Helena	Northern end of I-40 concurrency; southern end of US 49 concurrency; access to Louisiana Purchase Historic State Park
Monroe	Brinkley				AR 17 north – Cotton Plant	
Woodruff					AR 38 west – Cotton Plant	
Woodruff	Hunter				AR 306 east to AR 78	
Woodruff					AR 269 north to AR 145	
Woodruff	Penrose				AR 284 east to AR 193	
Cross	Fair Oaks				US 64 west – Bald Knob	Southern end of US 64 concurrency
Cross	Fair Oaks				US 64 east – Wynne	Northern end of US 64 concurrency
Cross	Tilton				AR 364 east – Vanndale	
Cross	Hickory Ridge				AR 42 to AR 37 – Cherry Valley	
Poinsett	Fisher				AR 214 east – White Hall	
Poinsett	Waldenburg				AR 14 – Newport, Harrisburg	
Poinsett					AR 956-1 – Lake Hogue Public Fishing	
Poinsett					AR 214 west – Grubbs	
Poinsett–Craighead county line					AR 158	
Craighead	Jonesboro				AR 226 west / US 78 west to US 67	Southern end of US 78/AR 226 concurrency
Craighead	Jonesboro				AR 226 east (Woodsprings Road)	Northern end of AR 226 concurrency
Craighead	Jonesboro			45	I-555 south / US 49 north / US 78 east (Southwest Drive) – West Memphis	Northern end of US 49 and US 78 concurrencies; southern end of I-555 concurrency
Craighead	Jonesboro			46	AR 226 west (Wood Springs Road) / Strawfloor Road	Eastern terminus of AR 226
Craighead	Jonesboro			47	Washington Avenue	
Craighead	Jonesboro			49	AR 91 (AR 18 west / Dan Avenue) I-555 ends	Northern end of AR 18 and I-555 concurrencies; northern terminus of I-555
Craighead	Bono				US 63B north – Bono Business District	
Craighead	Bono				AR 230 to AR 91 – Alicia, Bono	
Craighead	Bono				US 63B south – Bono Business District	
Greene	No major junctions					
Lawrence	Sedgwick				AR 228 east – Light	Southern end of AR 228 concurrency
Lawrence	Sedgwick				AR 228 west to AR 349	Northern end of AR 228 concurrency
Lawrence	Walnut Ridge				AR 91 – Egypt	
Lawrence	Walnut Ridge				US 63B north – Hoxie	
Lawrence	Walnut Ridge				I-57 / US 67 / US 412 east – Walnut Ridge, Pocahontas, Paragould, Little Rock	Southern end of US 412 concurrency; exits 121A-B on I-57
Lawrence	Hoxie				AR 367 – Walnut Ridge, Tuckerman	Interchange; former US 67
Lawrence					US 63B south – Hoxie Business District	
Lawrence					US 412B east – Walnut Ridge	
Lawrence	Black Rock				AR 25 – Black Rock, Powhatan, Davidsonville Historic State Park, Powhatan Courthouse, Lake Charles	Interchange
Lawrence	Black Rock				AR 117 north – Davidsonville Historic State Park	Southern end of AR 117 concurrency
Lawrence	Black Rock				AR 117 south – Smithville	Northern end of AR 117 concurrency
Lawrence	Imboden				US 62 east – Pocahontas, Business District	Southern end of US 62 concurrency
Lawrence	Imboden				AR 115 south – Smithville, Cave City	
Randolph	No major junctions					
Lawrence	Ravenden				AR 90 east – Ravenden Springs	
Sharp					AR 58E west – Williford	
Sharp					AR 58 west – Williford	
Sharp	Hardy				AR 175 north – Wirth	Southern end of AR 175 concurrency
Sharp	Hardy				US 63B north – Hardy, Historic District	
Sharp	Hardy				US 62 west / US 412 west / US 63B south (AR 175 south) to US 167 – Hardy, Ash Flat, Batesville, Mountain Home	Northern end of US 62/US 412/AR 175 concurrency
Fulton	Mammoth Spring				AR 9 south – Salem, Business District	
Fulton					US 63 north – Thayer	Continuation into Missouri
1.000 mi = 1.609 km; 1.000 km = 0.621 mi: Concurrency terminus; Route transition

== See also ==
- National Register of Historic Places in Poinsett County, Arkansas

U.S. Route 63
Previous state: Louisiana	Arkansas	Next state: Missouri
