= Arkansas Highway 91 =

State highway in Arkansas, United States

Highway 91

Route information
- Maintained by ArDOT
- Length: 31.91 mi (51.35 km)

Major junctions
- South end: US 49 / AR 1 in Jonesboro
- I-555 / US 63 / AR 18 in Jonesboro
- North end: US 412B in Walnut Ridge

Location
- Country: United States
- State: Arkansas

Highway system
- Arkansas Highway System; Interstate; US; State; Business; Spurs; Suffixed; Scenic; Heritage
← AR 90	→ AR 92

Highway 91 (AR 91, Ark. 91, and Hwy. 91) is a north–south state highway in the Upper Arkansas Delta. The route of 31.91 miles (51.35 km) begins at US Highway 49 (US 49) and Highway 1 at Jonesboro and runs north to US 412B in Walnut Ridge. The route is maintained by the Arkansas Department of Transportation (ArDOT).

== Route description ==
AR 91 begins in northwest Jonesboro at US 63 BUS. The route runs west in a concurrency with AR 18 over Interstate 555 (I-555) and US 63 as Dan Avenue. The concurrency continues west as Kings Highway until AR 18 turns south near Dryden. AR 91 meets AR 230 and AR 228 briefly in rural Lawrence County before again crossing US 63. The route continues north to cross I-57/US 67 before terminating at US 412B in Walnut Ridge.

== Major intersections ==
County	Location	mi	km	Destinations	Notes
Craighead	Jonesboro	0.00	0.00	US 49 / AR 1 – Paragould, Jonesboro	Southern terminus
Craighead	Jonesboro	2.47	3.98	AR 141 – Walcott, Downtown Jonesboro	
Craighead	Jonesboro	6.74	10.85	I-555 south / US 63 / AR 18 – Memphis, Walnut Ridge, Hardy	Northern terminus of I-555; Hwy. 18 concurrency begins northbound
Craighead		8.25	13.28	AR 349 south	Hwy. 349 northern terminus
Craighead	Three Way	14.35	23.09	AR 18 west – Cash, Newport	Hwy. 18 concurrency ends
Lawrence		19.83– 20.83	31.91– 33.52	AR 230 – Alicia, Bono	
Lawrence		22.35	35.97	AR 228 east – Sedgwick, Fontaine	Hwy. 228 western terminus
Lawrence	Walnut Ridge	29.15	46.91	US 63 to US 412 – Jonesboro, Hoxie	
Lawrence	Walnut Ridge	31.91	51.35	US 412B (Main St)	Northern terminus
1.000 mi = 1.609 km; 1.000 km = 0.621 mi: Concurrency terminus

== See also ==
- List of state highways in Arkansas
