= Arkansas Highway 226 =

State highway in Arkansas, United States

Highway 226

Route information
- Maintained by ArDOT
- Existed: 1958–present

Section 1
- Length: 2.38 mi (3.83 km)
- West end: CR 278 near Tuckerman
- Major intersections: AR 17 near Tuckerman
- East end: AR 37 in Tuckerman

Section 2
- Length: 25.28 mi (40.68 km)
- West end: AR 367 near Swifton
- Major intersections: AR 224 near Swifton; I-57 / US 67 / US 78 near Cash; AR 18 in Cash; AR 349 near Cash; US 49 / US 63 / US 78 west of Jonesboro
- East end: I-555 / US 63 / AR 18 in Jonesboro

Location
- Country: United States
- State: Arkansas

Highway system
- Arkansas Highway System; Interstate; US; State; Business; Spurs; Suffixed; Scenic; Heritage
| ← AR 225 | → AR 227 |

Arkansas Highway 226 (AR 226) is a designation for two state highways in northeast Arkansas. The main segment of 25.28 miles (40.68 km) runs east from Highway 367 near Swifton to Interstate 555 (I-555) in Jonesboro. Much of this route in the eastern segment is concurrent with U.S. Route 78 (US 78) when it was extended into Arkansas on November 2023. A short route of 2.38 miles (3.83 km) runs in rural Jackson County west of Tuckerman.

== Route description ==
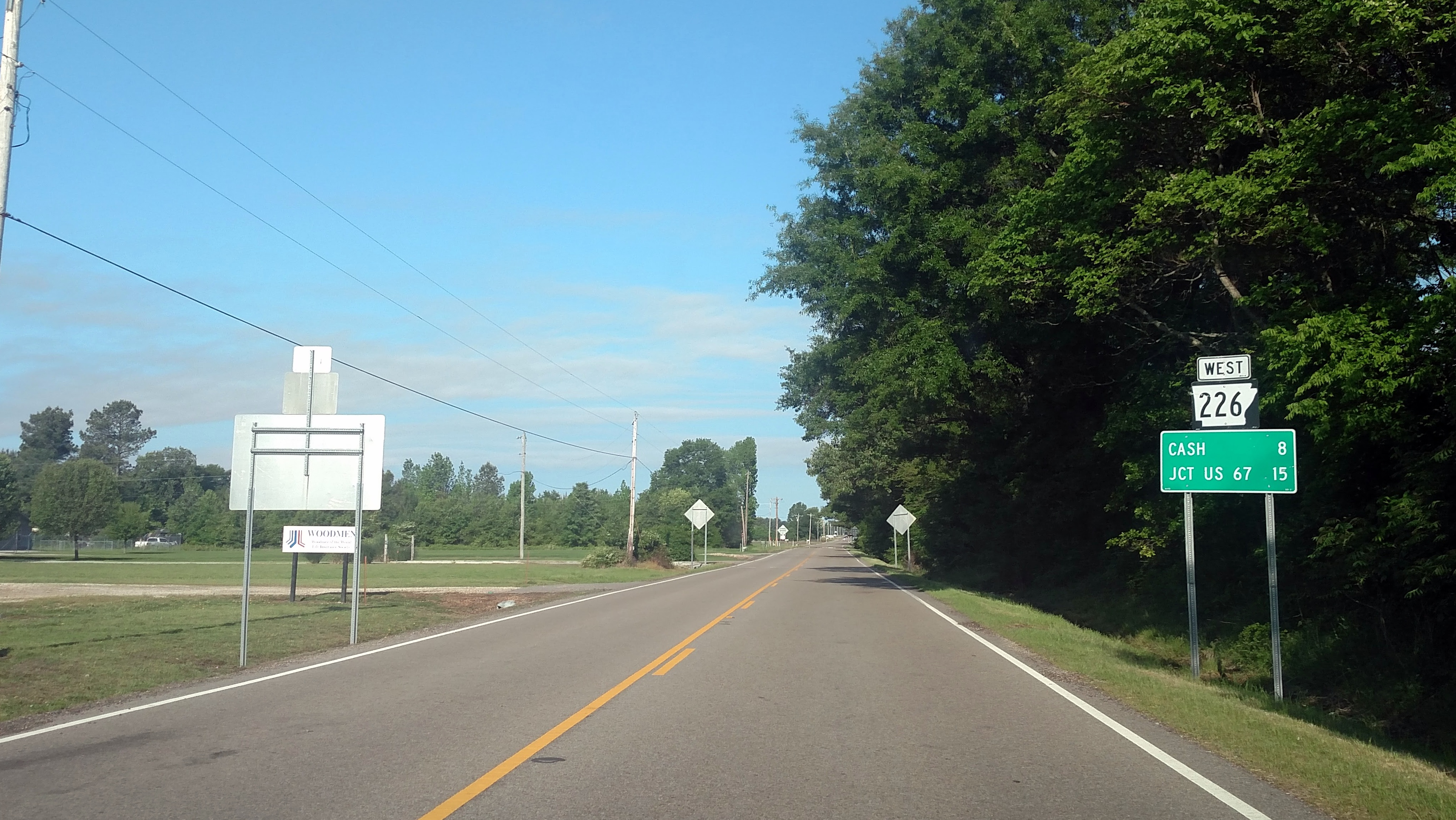
Highway 226 west of Jonesboro

AR 226 runs east from Jackson CR 278 to cross AR 17 to AR 37, where it terminates. The route then runs due east near Swifton through AR 18 in Cash, it meets with US 78 at I-57/US 67 and has concurrency with US 78 to Jonesboro while also meeting AR 349 near Jonesboro. Highway 226 winds into Jonesboro, where US 78 departs from AR 226 at US 63/US 49 then terminates at US 63/AR 18.

== History ==
The route became a state highway in 1958, traveling from an area south of Swifton east to Gibson. AR 226 was later extended to Jonesboro, including a concurrency with AR 39 (now US 49). When US 49 replaced AR 39 around 1980, AR 226 was split into its current alignment and AR 226S. The short Jackson County segment was added to the system in 1996.

In 2012, construction was completed that widened four miles of the highway to a four-lane divided facility from the highway's intersection with US 67 to just west of Cash. This was the first section of a larger plan that will ultimately widen Highway 226 to four lanes divided from US 67 to US 49 near Gibson. This widening project will give motorists a four-lane, divided route the entire length from Little Rock to Jonesboro.

Had I-30 been extended, there were plans to upgrade AR 226 to Interstate standards and designate it as "Interstate 730". I-30 extension was recycled into extending I-57 from Missouri and just making AR 226 into a standard four lane highway.

US 78 was extended north from Tennessee into Arkansas in November 2023 which follows eastern part of AR 226.

== Major intersections ==
| County | Location | mi | km | Destinations | Notes |
|---|---|---|---|---|---|
| Jackson | | 0 | 0.0 | CR 278 | Western terminus |
| Jackson | | 1.0 | 1.6 | AR 17 | |
| Jackson | Tuckerman | 2.4 | 3.9 | AR 37 – Tuckerman, Cord | Eastern terminus |
| Jackson | AR 226 short segment ends, AR 226 main segment begins at Arkansas Highway 367 | | | | |
| Jackson | | 0 | 0.0 | AR 367 – Tuckerman, Walnut Ridge | Western terminus; former US 67 |
| Jackson | | 1.4 | 2.3 | AR 224 | |
| Craighead | | 7.4 | 11.9 | I-57 / US 67 – St. Louis, Little Rock US 78 begins | Western terminus of US 78; exit 102 on I-57 |
| Craighead | Cash | 12.3 | 19.8 | AR 18 to AR 91 – Grubbs | |
| Craighead | | 19.3 | 31.1 | AR 349 north to AR 91 | Southern terminus of AR 349 |
| Craighead | | 22.0 | 35.4 | US 49 south / US 63 south – Waldenburg | West end of US 49/US 63 overlap |
| Craighead | | 23.0 | 37.0 | US 49 north / US 63 north / US 78 east – Jonesboro | East end of US 49/US 63/US 78 overlap |
| Craighead | Jonesboro | 25.5 | 41.0 | I-555 / US 63 / AR 18 – Trumann, Hoxie | Eastern terminus; exit 46 on I-555 |
1.000 mi = 1.609 km; 1.000 km = 0.621 mi: Concurrency terminus

== Jonesboro spur ==
Highway 226S
- Location: Jonesboro
- Length: 1.03 mi (1.66 km)
- Existed: 1980–present

Arkansas Highway 226 Spur is a spur route in Jonesboro. Known locally as Wood Springs Road, the route is 1.03 miles (1.66 km) in length.

=== Major intersections ===
The entire route is in Jonesboro, Craighead County.

| mi | km | Destinations | Notes |
|---|---|---|---|
| 0 | 0.0 | AR 226 | Northern terminus |
| 1.0 | 1.6 | US 49 (Southwest Dr) | Southern terminus |
1.000 mi = 1.609 km; 1.000 km = 0.621 mi

== See also ==
- List of state highways in Arkansas
