= Hoxie School District =

School district in Arkansas

Location
- 305 SW Alice Street; Hoxie, Arkansas 72433 United States

District information
- Grades: PK–12
- Accreditation: ADE
- Schools: 3
- NCES District ID: 0507990

Students and staff
- Students: 1,012
- Teachers: 85.10 (on FTE basis)
- Staff: 168.10 (on FTE basis)
- Student–teacher ratio: 11.89
- District mascot: Mustang
- Colors: Green; White

Other information
- Website: hoxieschools.com

Hoxie School District is a public school district based in Hoxie, Arkansas, United States. The Hoxie School District encompasses 124.17 square miles (321.6 km^{2}) of land including all or portions of Lawrence County communities including Hoxie, small portions of Walnut Ridge, Sedgwick, and Minturn.

Hoxie School District provides early childhood, elementary and secondary education for more than 1,100 prekindergarten through grade 5 and grades 8 through 12 at its two facilities. Hoxie School District schools are accredited by the Arkansas Department of Education (ADE) and by AdvancED.

== History ==
The Cloverbend School District merged into the Hoxie School District on July 1, 1983.

== Schools ==
- Hoxie High School—grades 7 through 12.
- Hoxie Elementary School—prekindergarten through grade 6.

== History of school integration ==
On June 25, 1955, largely the result of the recent Brown v. Board of Education ruling, Hoxie's superintendent, Kunkel Edward Vance, spearheaded plans to integrate the schools, and he received the unanimous support of Hoxie's school board. On July 11, 1955, Hoxie schools recommenced and allowed African American students to attend. Vance insisted that all facilities, including restrooms and cafeterias, be integrated, the third district in the state to do so.

Segregationists from outside the area converged on Hoxie in an unsuccessful attempt to reverse the school board decision. Approximately half of the white students boycotted the schools beginning on August 4, 1955. The Hoxie School Board filed suit against the segregationist leaders from Hoxie and elsewhere in the state and charged them with trespassing on school property, threatening picket lines, organizing boycotts, and intimidating school officials. In November, 1955, United States District Judge for the Eastern District of Arkansas Thomas C. Trimble ruled that pro-segregationists had "planned and conspired" to prevent integration in Hoxie. In December 1955, he issued a permanent injunction and restraining order against the segregationists. Their appeal in the Eight Circuit Court of Appeals was opposed by United States Attorney General Herbert Brownell and the U.S. Department of Justice. This marked the first intervention by the attorney general in support of any school district attempting to comply with the Brown decision. On October 25, 1956, the court ruled in favor of the Hoxie School Board.

U.S. Attorney Osro Cobb recalls that the situation at Hoxie

had reached the point of possible bloodshed. Guns were being carried; threats were being made, and violence could have erupted at any moment. Notwithstanding, a conference exploring the situation and its possible effects on the community with the individuals at the core of the problem had worked a minor miracle. It demonstrated that while passions and prejudice in race relations often hurl reason aside, reason can be restored at the conference table where there is dedication by the parties to the public interest. That is the lesson to ber learned from Hoxie.
