= Walnut Corner, Arkansas =

Walnut Corner, Arkansas may refer to the following communities:

- Walnut Corner, Greene County, Arkansas
- Walnut Corner, Phillips County, Arkansas
