= Arkansas Highway 349 =

State highway in Arkansas, United States

Highway 349

Route information
- Maintained by ArDOT
- Existed: November 23, 1966–present

Section 1
- Length: 4.45 mi (7.16 km)
- South end: AR 226 near Gibson
- North end: AR 18 / AR 91 near Herman

Section 2
- Length: 2.44 mi (3.93 km)
- South end: AR 230 near Sedgwick
- North end: AR 228 near Sedgwick

Location
- Country: United States
- State: Arkansas
- Counties: Craighead, Lawrence

Highway system
- Arkansas Highway System; Interstate; US; State; Business; Spurs; Suffixed; Scenic; Heritage
← AR 348	→ AR 350

Highway 349 (AR 349, Ark. 349, and Hwy. 349) is a designation for two state highways in Northeast Arkansas. One route of 4.45 miles (7.16 km) begins at Highway 226 and runs north to Highway 18/Highway 91. A second route of 2.44 miles (3.93 km) begins at Highway 230 and runs north to Highway 228. Both routes are maintained by the Arkansas Department of Transportation (ArDOT).

== Route description ==
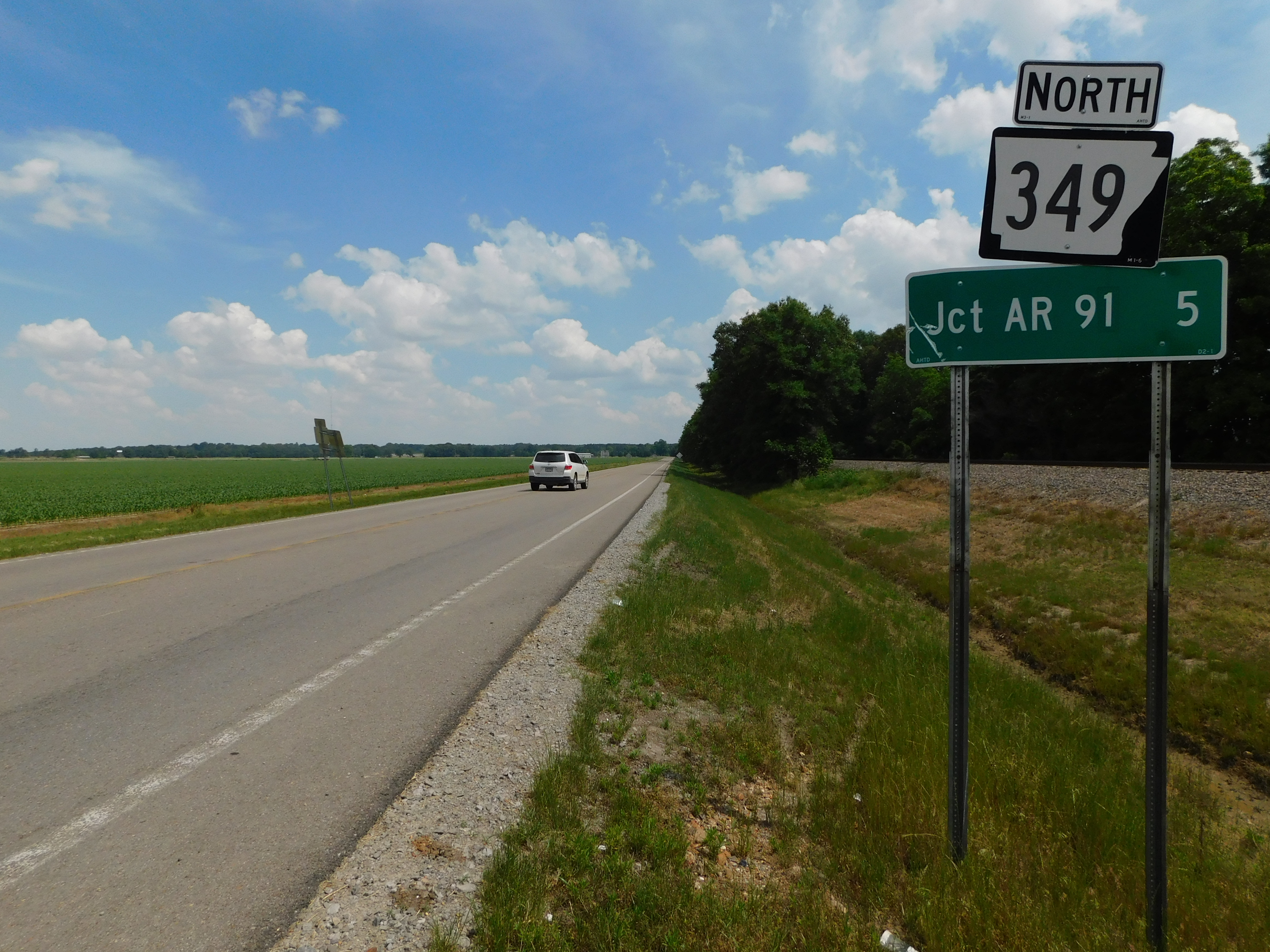
Highway 349 near Gilkerson, Arkansas looking north.

=== Craighead County ===
Highway 349 is a short connecting highway west of Jonesboro on Crowley's Ridge in Northeast Arkansas. Beginning at Highway 226, a four-lane divided road serving mostly Jonesboro-bound traffic, the highway runs east to a junction with Highway 226 Spur (AR 226S), when Highway 349 turns north along the Union Pacific Railway railroad tracks for approximately 1 mile (1.6 km). Passing through a residential area on the outskirts of Jonesboro, the route ends at a junction with Highway 18/Highway 91 at the campus of Westside Consolidated School District near Herman.

=== Lawrence County ===
Highway 349 begins at Highway 230 in southeastern Lawrence County. A rural connector route, the highway runs north and west to Highway 228 south of Sedgwick, where it terminates.

== History ==
Some three-digit highways in Northeast Arkansas are former alignments of US Highways, with the second two digits representing the former designation, such as Highway 267 and Highway 367 representing former alignments of U.S. Route 67 (US 67). Although Highway 349 has proximity to US 49, the first segment was designated in November 1966, prior to US 49 entering the area in 1978. The Lawrence County segment was created following the Arkansas General Assembly passing Act 9 of 1973. The act directed county judges and legislators to designate up to 12 miles (19 km) of county roads as state highways in each county.

In 1977, the southern terminus was extended to Highway 39 (which would be redesignated as US 49 the following year) at Gibson. In 1979, this mileage was removed from the state highway system in a deal between the Craighead County Judge and the AHTD. This changed the southern terminus from US 49 back to Highway 226.

== Major intersections ==
County	Location	mi	km	Destinations	Notes
Craighead		0.00	0.00	AR 226 / US 78 – Jonesboro	Southern terminus
Craighead		1.0	1.6	AR 226S east	AR 226S western terminus
Craighead		4.45	7.16	AR 18 / AR 91 – Jonesboro, Egypt	Northern terminus
Gap in route
Lawrence		0.00	0.00	AR 230 – Bono	Southern terminus
Lawrence		2.44	3.93	AR 228 – Sedgwick	Northern terminus
1.000 mi = 1.609 km; 1.000 km = 0.621 mi

== See also ==
- Mississippi Highway 149
- U.S. Route 49
