= Arkansas Highway 230 =

State highway in Arkansas, United States

Highway 230

Route information
- Maintained by ArDOT
- Existed: June 1965–present

Section 1
- Length: 8.15 mi (13.12 km)
- West end: AR 14 / AR 25 at Locust Grove
- East end: US 167 in Southside

Section 2
- Length: 13.80 mi (22.21 km)
- West end: US 167 in Cave City
- East end: AR 25 / AR 117 in Strawberry

Section 3
- Length: 16.25 mi (26.15 km)
- West end: AR 367 in Alicia
- East end: US 63B in Bono

Section 4
- Length: 7.04 mi (11.33 km)
- West end: US 49B in Brookland
- East end: AR 135 at Dixie

Location
- Country: United States
- State: Arkansas
- Counties: Craighead, Independence, Lawrence, Sharp

Highway system
- Arkansas Highway System; Interstate; US; State; Business; Spurs; Suffixed; Scenic; Heritage
| ← AR 229 | → AR 231 |

Highway 230 (AR 230, Ark. 230, and Hwy. 230) is a designation for four state highways in Arkansas. One route of 8.15 miles (13.12 km) begins at Highway 14/Highway 25 at Locust Grove and runs east to US Highway 167 (US 167) in Southside. A second route of 13.80 miles (22.21 km) begins at US 167 in Cave City and runs east to Highway 25 in Strawberry. A third route of 16.25 miles (26.15 km) begins at Highway 367 in Alicia and runs east to US 63 Business (US 63B) in Bono. A fourth route of 7.04 miles (11.33 km) begins at US 49B and runs east to Highway 135 at Dixie. All routes are maintained by the Arkansas State Highway and Transportation Department (AHTD).

== Route description ==
=== Locust Grove to Southside ===
AR 230 begins in Locust Grove at AR 14/AR 25. The route runs east through Jamestown to Southside, where it terminates at US 167.

=== Cave City to Strawberry ===
AR 230 begins in Cave City at US 167. It runs east to Strawberry, where it meets AR 25 and terminates. It does not cross or concur with any other state highways.

=== Alicia to Bono ===
AR 230 begins in Alicia at Arkansas Highway 367. The route runs east to meet I-57/US 67 and AR 91 in rural Lawrence County. AR 230 continues east to cross US 63 outside of Bono, terminating at US 63 BUS.

=== Brookland to Dixie ===
AR 230 runs due east from US 49 BUS in Brookland to AR 135 in Dixie.

== History ==
Highway 230 was first authorized by the Arkansas State Highway Commission (ASHC) on July 10, 1957 between Cave City and Strawberry. A second route was designated between Alicia and Bono on June 23, 1965, with a third highway created between Brookland and Dixie on January 12, 1966. The final section was created on April 26, 1978 when Highway 14 was rerouted onto Highway 25 toward Batesville. Highway 230 replaced the Highway 14 designation between Locust Grove and Southside.

== Major intersections ==
| County | Location | mi | km | Destinations | Notes |
|---|---|---|---|---|---|
| Independence | Locust Grove | 0.00 | 0.00 | AR 14 / AR 25 – Batesville, Mountain View, Heber Springs | Western terminus |
| Independence | Southside | 8.15 | 13.12 | US 167 (Batesville Boulevard) – Batesville, Bald Knob | Eastern terminus |
Gap in route
| Sharp | Cave City | 0.00 | 0.00 | US 167 (Main Street) – Batesville, Ash Flat | Western terminus |
| Lawrence | Strawberry | 13.80 | 22.21 | AR 25 (Main Street) / AR 117 north – Cord, Lynn, Jesup | Eastern terminus, AR 117 southern terminus |
| Lawrence | Gap in route | | | | |
| Lawrence | Alicia | 0.00 | 0.00 | AR 367 – Swifton, Hoxie | Western terminus; former US 67 |
| Lawrence | | | | I-57 / US 67 – Little Rock, Walnut Ridge | Exit 111 on I-57 |
| Lawrence | | 8.34– 0.00 | 13.42– 0.00 | AR 91 south – Grubbs, Hoxie | Southern end of AR 91 concurrency |
| Lawrence | | 9 | 14 | AR 91 north | Northern end of AR 91 concurrency |
| Lawrence | | 2.5 | 4.0 | AR 349 north | AR 349 southern terminus |
| Craighead | Bono | 7.59 | 12.21 | US 63 – Jonesboro, Hoxie | |
| Craighead | Bono | 7.91 | 12.73 | US 63B | Eastern terminus |
| Craighead | Gap in route | | | | |
| Craighead | Brookland | 0.00 | 0.00 | US 49B | Western terminus |
| Craighead | Dixie | 7.04 | 11.33 | AR 135 – Lake City, Paragould | Eastern terminus |
1.000 mi = 1.609 km; 1.000 km = 0.621 mi: Concurrency terminus

== Former routes ==
=== Brookland ===
Highway 230
- Location: Brookland
- Length: 1.6 mi (2.6 km)
- Existed: May 23, 1973–April 27, 1979

Highway 230 (AR 230, Ark. 230, and Hwy. 230) is a former state highway of 1.6 miles (2.6 km) in Craighead County.

==== Route description ====
The route began at a county road junction and ran east to Highway 1 north of Brookland.

==== History ====
A segment of Highway 230 was created north of Brookland on March 28, 1973 pursuant to Act 9 of 1973 by the Arkansas General Assembly at the request of the Arkansas County Judge. The act directed county judges and legislators to designate up to 12 miles (19 km) of county roads as state highways in each county. The entire route was deleted on April 27, 1979 in a swap involving many highways requested by the Craighead County Judge.

==== Major intersections ====
The entire route was in Craighead County.

| Location | mi | km | Destinations | Notes |
|---|---|---|---|---|
| | 0.0 | 0.0 | CR 762 (Pine Log Road) / CR 763 | Western terminus |
| | 1.6 | 2.6 | AR 1 – Brookland, Paragould | Eastern terminus |
1.000 mi = 1.609 km; 1.000 km = 0.621 mi

=== Swifton ===
Highway 230
- Location: Jackson County
- Length: 2.28 mi (3.67 km)
- Existed: April 23, 1975–February 28, 1979

Highway 230 (AR 230, Ark. 230, and Hwy. 230) is a former state highway of 2.28 miles (3.67 km) in Jackson County.

==== Route description ====
The route began at a county road junction and ran east to US 67 (now Highway 367) northeast of Swifton.

==== History ====
A segment of Highway 230 was created northeast of Swifton on April 23, 1975. The Jackson County Judge proposed an exchange to delete the entire route in exchange for the creation of Highway 224. The ASHC authorized the exchange on February 28, 1979.

==== Major intersections ====
The entire route was in Jackson County.

| Location | mi | km | Destinations | Notes |
|---|---|---|---|---|
| | 0.00 | 0.00 | CR 70 | Western terminus |
| | 2.28 | 3.67 | US 67 – Hoxie, Newport | Eastern terminus |
1.000 mi = 1.609 km; 1.000 km = 0.621 mi

== See also ==
- List of state highways in Arkansas
