= Hoxie High School =

Hoxie High School may refer to:

- Hoxie High School (Arkansas)
- Hoxie Jr-Sr High School, Hoxie, Kansas (Hoxie Community Schools USD 412)
