= Walnut Corner, Greene County, Arkansas =

- Unincorporated community
- Location within Arkansas Location within the United States
- Coordinates: 36°02′25″N 90°46′32″W
- Country: United States
- State: Arkansas
- County: Greene
- Elevation: 262 ft (80 m)
- Time zone: UTC-6 (Central (CST))
  - Summer (DST): UTC-5 (CDT)
- Area code: 870
- GNIS feature ID: 57228

Walnut Corner is an unincorporated community in Greene County, Arkansas, United States, located on Arkansas Highway 228, 6.5 miles (10.5 km) northeast of Sedgwick.
