= Hoxie High School (Arkansas) =

Location
- 305 SW Alice Street; Hoxie, Arkansas 72433; United States; 36°03′4″N 90°58′53″W

Information
- Type: Comprehensive
- School district: Hoxie School District
- CEEB code: 041175
- NCES School ID: 050799000518
- Principal: Lori McKenzie
- Teaching staff: 58.54 (on FTE basis)
- Grades: 7–12
- Enrollment: 368 (2023-2024)
- Student to teacher ratio: 5.89
- Colors: Green and white
- Mascot: Mustang
- Team name: Hoxie Mustangs
- Website: www.hoxieschools.com/o/hhs

Hoxie High School is an accredited public high school in Hoxie, Arkansas, United States. Hoxie High School is one of five public high schools in Lawrence County and the only high school of the Hoxie School District.

== Academics ==
The assumed course of study follows the Smart Core curriculum developed by the Arkansas Department of Education (ADE). Students complete regular coursework and exams and may select Advanced Placement (AP) courses and exams that may lead to college credit. Hoxie High School is accredited by the ADE and has been accredited by AdvancED since 1975.

== Athletics ==
The Hoxie High School mascot is the mustang with green and white serving as the school colors.

For 2012–14, the Hoxie Mustangs compete in the 3A Classification from the 3A Region 3 Conference administered by the Arkansas Activities Association. The Mustangs participate in football, volleyball, golf (boys/girls), cheer, dance, basketball (boys/girls), baseball, softball, track (boys/girls). On March 10, 2017, the Hoxie Lady Mustangs won the Class 3A Basketball Tournament.
