= Gipson, Arkansas =

Unincorporated community in Arkansas, US

Coordinates: 34°53′54″N 94°23′14″W

Gipson is an unincorporated community in Scott County, in the U.S. state of Arkansas.

== History ==
Gipson was founded ca. 1887, and named after James Gipson, a pioneer settler. A post office called Gipson was established in 1887, and remained in operation until 1902.
