= Arkansas Highway 228 =

Highway in Arkansas

Highway 228
- AR 228 highlighted in red

Route information
- Maintained by ArDOT
- Existed: July 10, 1957–present

Section 1
- Length: 4.50 mi (7.24 km)
- West end: CR 534 at Clover Bend
- East end: AR 367 in Minturn

Section 2
- Length: 15.84 mi (25.49 km)
- West end: AR 91
- East end: US 412B at Light

Location
- Country: United States
- State: Arkansas
- Counties: Lawrence, Greene

Highway system
- Arkansas Highway System; Interstate; US; State; Business; Spurs; Suffixed; Scenic; Heritage
← AR 227	→ AR 229

Highway 228 (AR 228, Ark. 228, and Hwy. 228) is a designation for two state highways in Northeast Arkansas. One route of 4.50 miles (7.24 km) begins at County Road 534 (CR 534) at Clover Bend and runs east to Highway 367 in Minturn. A second route of 15.84 miles (25.49 km) begins at Highway 91 and runs northeast to US Highway 412 (US 412) at Light. Both routes are maintained by the Arkansas Department of Transportation (ArDOT).

== Route description ==
=== Minturn ===
Highway 228 begins state maintenance at Lawrence County Road 534. It runs east through the Clover Bend Historic District to Minturn, where it ends at US 67.

=== Highway 91 to Light ===
Highway 228 runs diagonally from southwest to northeast, beginning at Highway 91. The route runs northeast, serving as the northern terminus of Highway 349 before entering Sedgwick where it meets US 63. Highway 228 overlaps US 63 briefly before turning northeast into Greene County. It continues northeast to terminate at US 412 at Light.

== History ==
Highway 228 was created by the Arkansas State Highway Commission on July 10, 1957, between Clover Bend and Minturn. A second route was created between Sedgwick and Light April 24, 1963. The Arkansas General Assembly passed Act 9 of 1973, which directed county judges and legislators to designate up to 12 miles (19 km) of county roads as state highways in each county. Highway 228 was extended west to Highway 91 on May 23, 1973.

== Major intersections ==
Mile markers reset at concurrencies.

County	Location	mi	km	Destinations	Notes
Lawrence	Clover Bend	0.00	0.00	CR 534	Western terminus
Lawrence	Minturn	4.50	7.24	AR 367 – Newport, Hoxie	Eastern terminus; former US 67
Lawrence	Gap in route				
Lawrence		0.00	0.00	AR 91 – Walnut Ridge, Egypt, Jonesboro	Western terminus
Lawrence		1.47	2.37	AR 349 south	AR 349 northern terminus
Lawrence	Sedgwick	6.65– 0.00	10.70– 0.00	US 63 (Main Street) – Hoxie, Jonesboro	
Greene	Fontaine	3.10	4.99	AR 168 east – Lorado	AR 168 western terminus
Greene	Light	9.04	14.55	US 412 – Paragould, Walnut Ridge	
Greene	Light	9.19	14.79	US 412B	Eastern terminus
1.000 mi = 1.609 km; 1.000 km = 0.621 mi: Concurrency terminus

== See also ==
- List of state highways in Arkansas
