= Minturn, Arkansas =

- Town
- Location of Minturn in Lawrence County, Arkansas
- Coordinates: 35°58′24″N 91°1′44″W
- Country: United States
- State: Arkansas
- County: Lawrence

Area
  - Total: 0.57 sq mi (1.47 km^{2})
  - Land: 0.57 sq mi (1.47 km^{2})
  - Water: 0 sq mi (0.00 km^{2})
- Elevation: 262 ft (80 m)

Population (2020)
  - Total: 87
  - Estimate (2025): 86 ▼
  - Density: 152.9/sq mi (59.03/km^{2})
- Time zone: UTC-6 (Central (CST))
  - Summer (DST): UTC-5 (CDT)
- ZIP code: 72445
- Area code: 870
- FIPS code: 05-46100
- GNIS feature ID: 0058194

Minturn is a town in Lawrence County, Arkansas, United States. As of the 2020 census, Minturn had a population of 87.

== Geography ==
Minturn is located southeast of the center of Lawrence County at 35°58′24″N 91°1′44″W (35.973425, -91.028815).

According to the United States Census Bureau, the town has a total area of 1.3 km^{2} (0.5 mi^{2}), all land.

- Arkansas Highway 367 passes through the center of Minturn. It follows the former route of U.S. Route 67, which now passes east of Minturn on a four-lane freeway with no direct access to the town. Highway 367 leads northeast 6 miles (10 km) to Hoxie and southwest the same distance to Alicia.
- Arkansas Highway 228 leads west 6 miles (10 km) to a dead end at the Black River.

== Demographics ==
Historical population
Census	Pop.	Note	%±
1880	49		—
1910	251		—
1920	278		10.8%
1930	189		−32.0%
1940	133		−29.6%
1950	138		3.8%
1960	61		−55.8%
1970	97		59.0%
1980	169		74.2%
1990	124		−26.6%
2000	114		−8.1%
2010	109		−4.4%
2020	87		−20.2%
2025 (est.)	86	▼	−1.1%
U.S. Decennial Census

As of the census of 2000, there were 114 people, 50 households, and 33 families residing in the town. The population density was 84.6/km^{2} (217.8/mi^{2}). There were 58 housing units at an average density of 43.1/km^{2} (110.8/mi^{2}). The racial makeup of the town was 97.37% White, and 2.63% from two or more races.

There were 50 households, out of which 36.0% had children under the age of 18 living with them, 50.0% were married couples living together, 12.0% had a female householder with no husband present, and 34.0% were non-families. 32.0% of all households were made up of individuals, and 20.0% had someone living alone who was 65 years of age or older. The average household size was 2.28 and the average family size was 2.85.

In the town, the population was spread out, with 28.1% under the age of 18, 6.1% from 18 to 24, 29.8% from 25 to 44, 23.7% from 45 to 64, and 12.3% who were 65 years of age or older. The median age was 34 years. For every 100 females, there were 90.0 males. For every 100 females age 18 and over, there were 82.2 males.

The median income for a household in the town was $23,036, and the median income for a family was $25,313. Males had a median income of $17,188 versus $15,750 for females. The per capita income for the town was $11,438. There were 35.9% of families and 32.0% of the population living below the poverty line, including 41.9% of under eighteens and 15.8% of those over 64.
