= Arkansas Highway 224 =

State highway in Arkansas, United States

Highway 224

Route information
- Maintained by ArDOT

Section 1
- Length: 8.25 mi (13.28 km)
- West end: AR 367
- East end: Swifton city line

Section 2
- Length: 8.26 mi (13.29 km)
- West end: I-57 / US 67
- East end: I-57 / US 67 / AR 14 near Newport

Location
- Country: United States
- State: Arkansas
- Counties: Jackson

Highway system
- Arkansas Highway System; Interstate; US; State; Business; Spurs; Suffixed; Scenic; Heritage
← AR 223	→ AR 225

Arkansas Highway 224 (AR 224) is a designation for two east–west state highways in Jackson County, Arkansas. One segment runs 8.25 miles (13.28 km) from Highway 367 east to the Swifton city line. A second segment runs 8.26 miles (13.29 km) from Interstate 57 (I-57) northeast to I-57.

== Route description ==
=== Tuckerman to Swifton ===
Highway 224 begins at Highway 367 near Tuckerman and runs east. The route turns north and crosses over Highway 226 and a temporary designation of US 67 until the Arkansas State Highway and Transportation Department (AHTD) completes a new freeway alignment for US 67. Slightly north of this alignment, the route terminates at the Swifton south city limits. The average daily traffic counts from the AHTD for 2010 show that a maximum of about 610 vehicles per day (VPD) use the portion near Swifton, with the count dropping to 180 VPD for portions further south.

=== I-57 to Highway 14 ===
Highway 224 begins at an exit along I-57/US 67 and runs east through Ingleside. The route turns north to run along I-57 until it terminates at Highway 14, directly adjacent to another exit along I-57 south of Newport. Traffic counts from the AHTD in 2010 indicate that the average daily traffic volume on this segment of Highway 101 is at a maximum of 150 VPD near the eastern terminus and decreases as you travel further southwest.

== Major intersections ==
The entire route is in Jackson County.

Location	mi	km	Destinations	Notes
	0.00	0.00	AR 367 – Tuckerman, Hoxie	Western terminus; former US 67
	6.97	11.22	AR 226 – Tuckerman, Cash	Former US 67
Swifton	8.25	13.28	Swifton city limits	Eastern terminus
Gap in route
	0.00	0.00	I-57 / US 67 – Little Rock, Newport	Western terminus; exit 74 on I-57
	8.26	13.29	I-57 / US 67 / AR 14 – Waldenburg, Newport	Eastern terminus; exit 80 on I-57
1.000 mi = 1.609 km; 1.000 km = 0.621 mi
