= Bono, Arkansas =

City in Arkansas, United States

- City
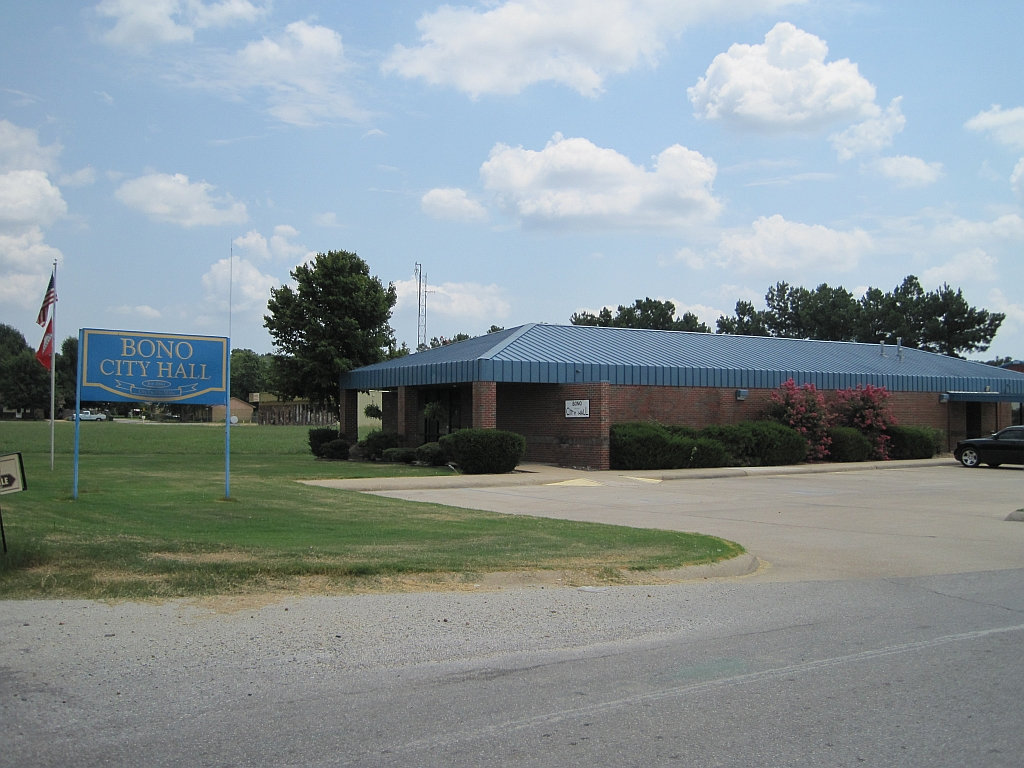
- Bono City Hall, July 2011

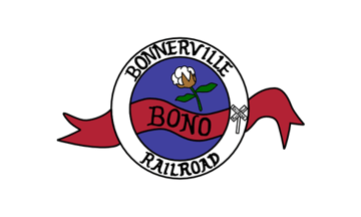
- Flag

- Location of Bono in Craighead County, Arkansas.
- Coordinates: 35°54′40″N 90°48′03″W
- Country: United States
- State: Arkansas
- County: Craighead
- Established: July 14, 1916

Government
  - Mayor: Danny Shaw

Area
  - Total: 2.66 sq mi (6.90 km^{2})
  - Land: 2.66 sq mi (6.90 km^{2})
  - Water: 0 sq mi (0.00 km^{2})
- Elevation: 262 ft (80 m)

Population (2020)
  - Total: 2,409
  - Estimate (2025): 2,858 ▲
  - Density: 904/sq mi (349.2/km^{2})
- Time zone: UTC-6 (Central (CST))
  - Summer (DST): UTC-5 (CDT)
- ZIP Code: 72416
- Area code: 870
- FIPS code: 05-07630
- GNIS feature ID: 2403895
- Website: cityofbono.gov

Bono is a city in Craighead County, Arkansas, United States. The population was 2,409 at the 2020 census, up from 2,131 in 2010. It is included in the Jonesboro, Arkansas Metropolitan Statistical Area. Bono's most prominent landmarks are the Bono Bridge and the Bono Cemetery.

== History ==
Prior to European American settlement, northeast Arkansas was home to several indigenous communities, these included a Delaware village, as well as scattered Shawnee and Cherokee homesteaders. After the New Madrid earthquakes, existing communities were forced westward.

American settlement began in 1837, when John Anderson and his son established the Big Creek Township. At the time the homestead was solely agricultural and part of Greene County, and remained so until its incorporation into the newly formed Craighead County in 1859.

In 1883, the Kansas City, Fort Scott, and Memphis Railroad began operations in Craighead county to serve the local community. This attracted a wealthy and early settler, Alfred Bonner, who sought to establish a town along the railroad. The settlement was originally named Bonnerville in his honor, and an unofficial post office began operating in October 4, 1883, but operation was discontinued on February 5, 1884, after the application to establish a post office was denied, due to the name's similarities to Booneville. When a name change was recommended residents held a contest and chose the name Bono. The name was approved, and a post office was established on November 20, 1884. The city was later incorporated in July 12, 1916.

According to the Encyclopedia of Arkansas:

Bono originally consisted of a grocery store, a depot, a saloon, a commissary, several churches, section houses, a few shotgun houses, a few tents, a big tie yard, and a sawmill. As more people moved to the town, Bono evolved as a center of commerce. The Bono Mercantile Company, a general store established in 1911 by Berl Broome and George Lamb, served as a hub for trade and socialization. The store had a gossip bench and a spittoon out front, and it sold food, clothing, hardware, wagons, dry goods, and farm implements. A hand-powered elevator at the rear of the store moved merchandise between floors.

== Geography ==
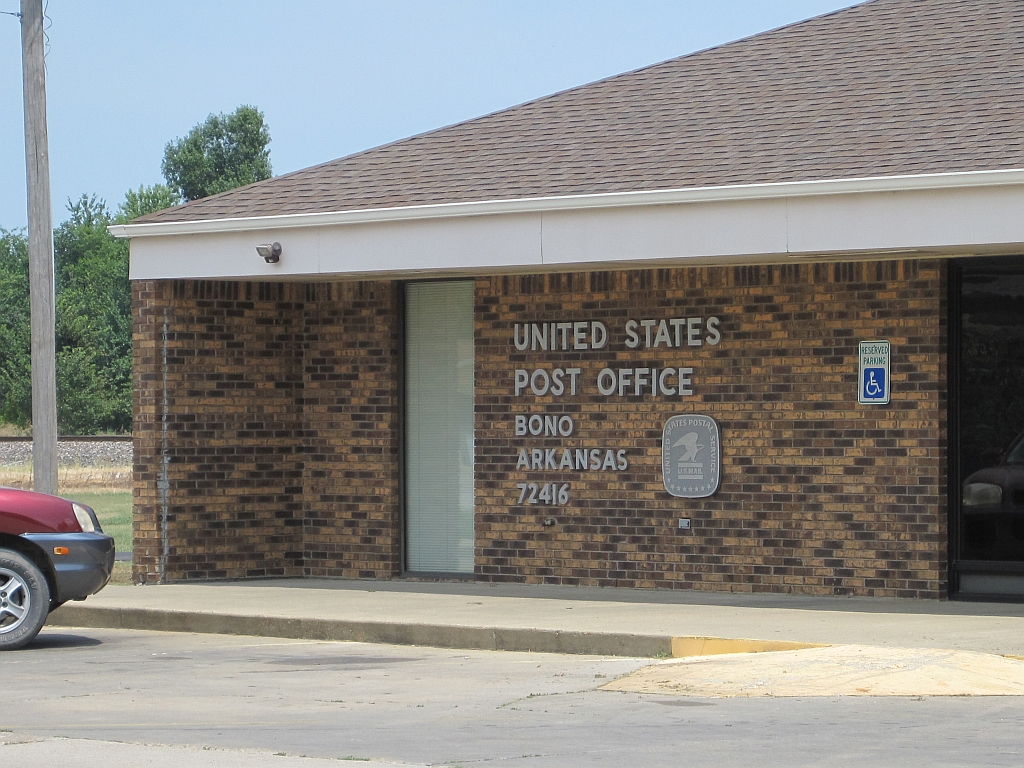
Bono Post office

Bono is located in northwestern Craighead County 8 miles (13 km) northwest of Jonesboro, the county seat, via U.S. Route 63. The city of Walnut Ridge is 15 miles (24 km) farther to the northwest along US 63. As of 2024, the city is governed by Mayor Danny Shaw.

According to the United States Census Bureau, the city has a total area of 1.4 square miles (3.7 km^{2}), all land.

=== List of highways ===
- US 63
- U.S. Route 63 Business
- Arkansas Highway 230

== Demographics ==
Historical population
Census	Pop.	Note	%±
1930	209		—
1940	248		18.7%
1950	352		41.9%
1960	339		−3.7%
1970	428		26.3%
1980	967		125.9%
1990	1,220		26.2%
2000	1,512		23.9%
2010	2,131		40.9%
2020	2,409		13.0%
2025 (est.)	2,858	▲	18.6%
U.S. Decennial Census; 2014 Estimate

=== 2020 census ===
As of the 2020 census, Bono had a population of 2,409. The median age was 31.4 years. 28.6% of residents were under the age of 18 and 11.0% of residents were 65 years of age or older. For every 100 females, there were 88.4 males, and for every 100 females age 18 and over, there were 83.7 males age 18 and over.

0.0% of residents lived in urban areas, while 100.0% lived in rural areas.

There were 945 households in Bono, including 653 families. Of all households, 40.0% had children under the age of 18 living in them, 43.9% were married-couple households, 18.3% were households with a male householder and no spouse or partner present, and 29.9% were households with a female householder and no spouse or partner present. About 26.4% of all households were made up of individuals, and 9.7% had someone living alone who was 65 years of age or older.

There were 1,025 housing units, of which 7.8% were vacant. The homeowner vacancy rate was 1.4% and the rental vacancy rate was 7.1%.

Bono racial composition
Race	Number	Percentage
White (non-Hispanic)	2,079	86.3%
Black or African American (non-Hispanic)	110	4.57%
Native American	2	0.08%
Other/Mixed	130	5.4%
Hispanic or Latino	88	3.65%

=== 2000 census ===
As of the census of 2000, there were 1,512 people, 574 households, and 435 families residing in the city. The population density was 1,052.5 inhabitants per square mile (406.4/km^{2}). There were 634 housing units at an average density of 441.3 per square mile (170.4/km^{2}). The racial makeup of the city was 97.69% White, 0.13% Black or African American, 0.26% Native American, 0.07% Asian, 0.66% from other races, and 1.19% from two or more races. 1.72% of the population were Hispanic or Latino of any race. There were 574 households, out of which 42.9% had children under the age of 18 living with them, 54.7% were married couples living together, 16.6% had a female householder with no husband present, and 24.2% were non-families. 20.6% of all households were made up of individuals, and 6.6% had someone living alone who was 65 years of age or older. The average household size was 2.63 and the average family size was 3.05.

In the city, the population was spread out, with 31.1% under the age of 18, 10.4% from 18 to 24, 31.2% from 25 to 44, 19.6% from 45 to 64, and 7.7% who were 65 years of age or older. The median age was 29 years. For every 100 females, there were 97.1 males. For every 100 females age 18 and over, there were 90.5 males.

The median income for a household in the city was $31,307, and the median income for a family was $33,618. Males had a median income of $25,063 versus $18,426 for females. The per capita income for the city was $13,764. About 13.6% of families and 15.2% of the population were below the poverty line, including 18.7% of those under age 18 and 13.8% of those aged 65 or over.

== Education ==
Bono residents are served by the Westside Consolidated School District. The district opened in 1966 after the Bono School District merged into it. Its high school is Westside High School.

== Climate ==
The climate is characterized by relatively high temperatures and evenly distributed precipitation throughout the year. The Köppen Climate Classification sub-type for this climate is "Cfa" (Humid Subtropical Climate).

Climate data for Bono, Arkansas
Month	Jan	Feb	Mar	Apr	May	Jun	Jul	Aug	Sep	Oct	Nov	Dec	Year
Mean daily maximum °C (°F)	7 (45)	10 (50)	16 (61)	22 (72)	27 (81)	32 (89)	33 (92)	32 (90)	29 (84)	23 (74)	16 (61)	9 (49)	22 (71)
Mean daily minimum °C (°F)	−2 (28)	0 (32)	5 (41)	11 (51)	15 (59)	19 (67)	22 (71)	21 (69)	17 (62)	10 (50)	6 (42)	0 (32)	10 (50)
Average precipitation mm (inches)	84 (3.3)	97 (3.8)	120 (4.8)	130 (5.1)	130 (5.1)	79 (3.1)	69 (2.7)	76 (3)	94 (3.7)	86 (3.4)	120 (4.7)	110 (4.5)	1,200 (47.2)
Source: Weatherbase
