= Lawrence County, Arkansas =

County in Arkansas, United States

- County
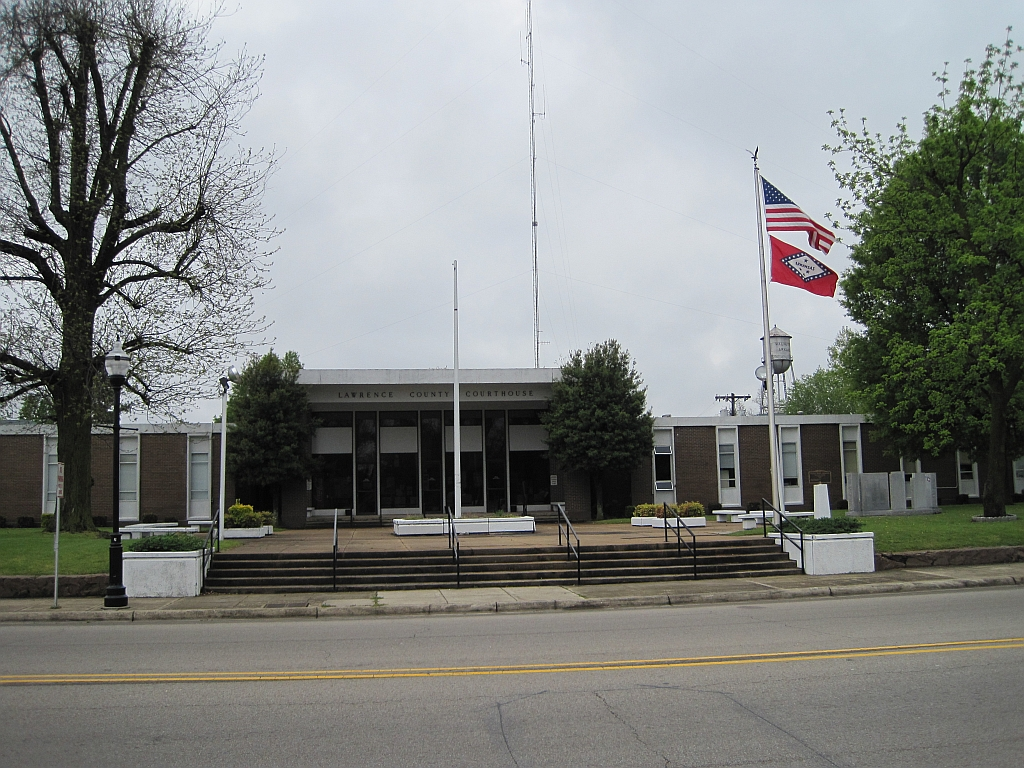
- Lawrence County Courthouse

- Location within the U.S. state of Arkansas
- Coordinates: 36°01′50″N 91°06′47″W
- Country: United States
- State: Arkansas
- Founded: January 15, 1815
- Named for: James Lawrence
- Seat: Walnut Ridge
- Largest city: Walnut Ridge

Area
  - Total: 592 sq mi (1,530 km^{2})
  - Land: 588 sq mi (1,520 km^{2})
  - Water: 4.7 sq mi (12 km^{2}) 0.8%

Population (2020)
  - Total: 16,216
  - Estimate (2025): 16,273 ▲
  - Density: 27.6/sq mi (10.6/km^{2})
- Time zone: UTC−6 (Central)
  - Summer (DST): UTC−5 (CDT)
- Congressional district: 1st
- Website: lawrencecountyar.com

Lawrence County is a county located in the U.S. state of Arkansas. As of the 2020 census, the population was 16,216. The county seat is Walnut Ridge. Lawrence County is Arkansas's second county, formed on January 15, 1815, and named for Captain James Lawrence who fought in the War of 1812. It is an alcohol prohibition or dry county.

== History ==
There were French-speaking people living in what is now Lawrence County, Arkansas in the late eighteenth and early nineteenth centuries. Part of Lawrence County, Arkansas, along the Black River, was formerly known as "Fourche De Maux," probably after the name of an early French trader and trapper, however the French provenance is uncertain.

Pierre LeMieux, a member of the Janis family, was one of the many French-speaking settlers in the area. He claimed a Spanish land grant in what is now Lawrence County, Arkansas, near Peach Orchard, which was called "Petit Baril" by the French

The De Muns were one of the most prominent families in Lawrence County, Arkansas history. Lewis De Mun and two of his siblings joined Frenchman Jean-Élie Tholozan in 1813 or 1814 to seek a 10,000-acre land claim on the Black River. On December 31, 1814, the eve of Lawrence County's formation as a county, Lewis De Mun would create a grist and saw mill which would be named "Mun & Co."

Following the Louisiana Purchase, the area currently encompassing Lawrence County was contained within the Louisiana Territory from 1805 to 1812, and the Missouri Territory from 1812 until the creation of Arkansas Territory in 1819. While the southern portion of Missouri Territory began to be settled, Lawrence County was created on January 15, 1815, from New Madrid County and Arkansas County. The large area spanned from Cape Girardeau County to the Arkansas River.

== Geography ==
According to the U.S. Census Bureau, the county has a total area of 592 square miles (1,530 km^{2}), of which 588 square miles (1,520 km^{2}) is land and 4.7 square miles (12 km^{2}) (0.8%) is water.

=== Adjacent counties ===
- Randolph County (north)
- Greene County (east)
- Craighead County (southeast)
- Jackson County (south)
- Independence County (southwest)
- Sharp County (west)

== Demographics ==
Historical population
Census	Pop.	Note	%±
1830	2,806		—
1840	2,835		1.0%
1850	5,274		86.0%
1860	9,372		77.7%
1870	5,981		−36.2%
1880	8,782		46.8%
1890	12,984		47.8%
1900	16,491		27.0%
1910	20,001		21.3%
1920	22,098		10.5%
1930	21,663		−2.0%
1940	22,651		4.6%
1950	21,303		−6.0%
1960	17,267		−18.9%
1970	16,320		−5.5%
1980	18,447		13.0%
1990	17,457		−5.4%
2000	17,774		1.8%
2010	17,415		−2.0%
2020	16,216		−6.9%
2025 (est.)	16,273	▲	0.4%
U.S. Decennial Census; 1790–1960 1900–1990; 1990–2000 2010

=== 2020 census ===
As of the 2020 census, the county had a population of 16,216. The median age was 41.0 years. 22.3% of residents were under the age of 18 and 20.0% of residents were 65 years of age or older. For every 100 females there were 99.5 males, and for every 100 females age 18 and over there were 97.6 males age 18 and over.

The racial makeup of the county was 92.8% White, 0.9% Black or African American, 0.3% American Indian and Alaska Native, 0.2% Asian, 0.1% Native Hawaiian and Pacific Islander, 1.1% from some other race, and 4.6% from two or more races. Hispanic or Latino residents of any race comprised 2.2% of the population.

40.3% of residents lived in urban areas, while 59.7% lived in rural areas.

There were 6,514 households in the county, of which 30.1% had children under the age of 18 living in them. Of all households, 48.2% were married-couple households, 20.2% were households with a male householder and no spouse or partner present, and 26.3% were households with a female householder and no spouse or partner present. About 29.6% of all households were made up of individuals and 14.7% had someone living alone who was 65 years of age or older.

There were 7,489 housing units, of which 13.0% were vacant. Among occupied housing units, 67.3% were owner-occupied and 32.7% were renter-occupied. The homeowner vacancy rate was 2.0% and the rental vacancy rate was 6.5%.

=== 2000 census ===
As of the 2000 census, there were 17,774 people, 7,108 households, and 5,011 families residing in the county. The population density was 30 people per square mile (12 people/km^{2}). There were 8,085 housing units at an average density of 14 units per square mile (5.4 units/km^{2}). The racial makeup of the county was 97.78% White, 0.44% Black or African American, 0.57% Native American, 0.05% Asian, 0.01% Pacific Islander, 0.12% from other races, and 1.02% from two or more races. 0.68% of the population were Hispanic or Latino of any race.

There were 7,108 households, out of which 30.80% had children under the age of 18 living with them, 57.70% were married couples living together, 9.60% had a female householder with no husband present, and 29.50% were non-families. 26.70% of all households were made up of individuals, and 14.20% had someone living alone who was 65 years of age or older. The average household size was 2.42 and the average family size was 2.92.

In the county, the population was spread out, with 24.00% under the age of 18, 9.60% from 18 to 24, 25.90% from 25 to 44, 23.20% from 45 to 64, and 17.40% who were 65 years of age or older. The median age was 38 years. For every 100 females there were 93.60 males. For every 100 females age 18 and over, there were 89.40 males.

The median income for a household in the county was $27,139, and the median income for a family was $32,163. Males had a median income of $26,288 versus $18,518 for females. The per capita income for the county was $13,785. About 13.90% of families and 18.40% of the population were below the poverty line, including 25.50% of those under age 18 and 20.10% of those age 65 or over.

== Government ==
United States presidential election results for Lawrence County, Arkansas
Year	Republican		Democratic		Third party(ies)	
Year	No.	%	No.	%	No.	%
1896	337	16.42%	1,679	81.78%	37	1.80%
1900	476	32.96%	958	66.34%	10	0.69%
1904	534	42.41%	672	53.38%	53	4.21%
1908	583	31.79%	1,188	64.78%	63	3.44%
1912	218	15.15%	929	64.56%	292	20.29%
1916	298	14.87%	1,706	85.13%	0	0.00%
1920	699	28.72%	1,686	69.27%	49	2.01%
1924	261	23.18%	689	61.19%	176	15.63%
1928	774	39.03%	1,204	60.72%	5	0.25%
1932	293	8.58%	3,056	89.54%	64	1.88%
1936	457	16.91%	2,230	82.50%	16	0.59%
1940	852	25.36%	2,484	73.93%	24	0.71%
1944	927	33.83%	1,810	66.06%	3	0.11%
1948	497	18.60%	2,001	74.89%	174	6.51%
1952	1,570	40.84%	2,206	57.39%	68	1.77%
1956	1,584	40.12%	2,303	58.33%	61	1.55%
1960	1,800	44.28%	2,074	51.02%	191	4.70%
1964	2,013	36.35%	3,498	63.16%	27	0.49%
1968	1,788	28.77%	1,613	25.96%	2,813	45.27%
1972	3,981	69.45%	1,751	30.55%	0	0.00%
1976	1,708	24.82%	5,167	75.08%	7	0.10%
1980	3,245	46.60%	3,547	50.94%	171	2.46%
1984	4,039	60.50%	2,594	38.86%	43	0.64%
1988	3,205	49.91%	3,179	49.51%	37	0.58%
1992	2,124	30.65%	4,146	59.84%	659	9.51%
1996	1,823	29.69%	3,652	59.47%	666	10.85%
2000	2,626	43.48%	3,255	53.89%	159	2.63%
2004	2,951	44.61%	3,544	53.58%	120	1.81%
2008	3,357	57.58%	2,138	36.67%	335	5.75%
2012	3,536	63.83%	1,788	32.27%	216	3.90%
2016	4,064	71.49%	1,263	22.22%	358	6.30%
2020	4,569	78.01%	1,080	18.44%	208	3.55%
2024	4,608	80.96%	965	16.95%	119	2.09%

=== Government ===
The county government is a constitutional body granted specific powers by the Constitution of Arkansas and the Arkansas Code. The quorum court is the legislative branch of the county government and controls all spending and revenue collection. Representatives are called justices of the peace and are elected from county districts every even-numbered year. The number of districts in a county vary from nine to fifteen, and district boundaries are drawn by the county election commission. The Lawrence County Quorum Court has nine members. Presiding over quorum court meetings is the county judge, who serves as the chief executive officer of the county. The county judge is elected at-large and does not vote in quorum court business, although capable of vetoing quorum court decisions.

Lawrence County, Arkansas Elected countywide officials
Position	Officeholder	Party
County Judge	Gary Barnhill	Republican
County Clerk	Brandi Parker	Republican
Circuit Clerk	Michelle Evans	Independent
Sheriff	Tony Waldrupe	Independent
Treasurer	Connie Mullen	Republican
Collector	Stephanie Harris	Independent
Assessor	Becky Holder	Independent
Coroner	Chris Warden	Republican

The composition of the Quorum Court after the 2024 elections is 8 Republicans and 1 Democrat. Justices of the Peace (members) of the Quorum Court following the elections are:

- District 1: Pardo Roberts (R)
- District 2: Frank Brewer (R)
- District 3: Lloyd Clark (R)
- District 4: Heath Davis (D)
- District 5: Frank Binkley (R)
- District 6: Jeff Yates (R)
- District 7: Tracy Moore (R)
- District 8: Kenny Jones (R)
- District 9: Troy Owens (R)

Additionally, the townships of Lawrence County are entitled to elect their own respective constables, as set forth by the Constitution of Arkansas. Constables are largely of historical significance as they were used to keep the peace in rural areas when travel was more difficult. The township constables as of the 2024 elections are:

- Annieville: Joseph A. Warnick (D)
- Black River: Jimmy D. Smith (R)
- Black Rock: Jewel Tommy Milgrim (R)
- Boas: Mark VanBrook (R)
- Cache: Ronnie Clay Knight (R)
- Campbell: Kenneth Cole (R)
- Duty: Shawn King (R)
- Lawrence: Duane Hutchinson (R)
- Marion: William Teague (R)
- Reeds Creek: Hunter Durham (R)
- Thacker: James Saxe (R)

=== Townships ===
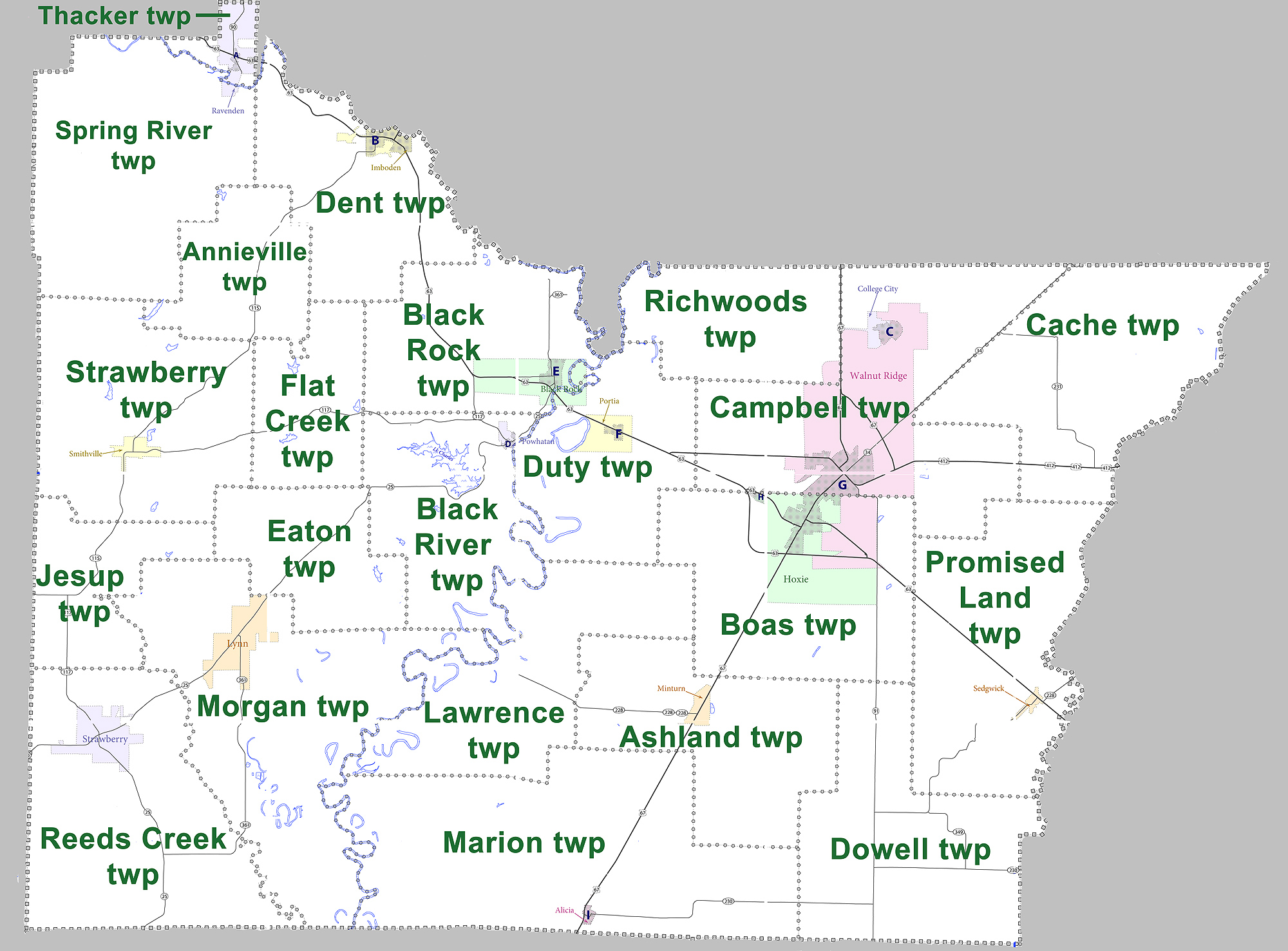
Townships in Lawrence County, Arkansas as of 2010

Townships in Arkansas are the divisions of a county. Each township includes unincorporated areas; some may have incorporated cities or towns within part of their boundaries. Arkansas townships have limited purposes in modern times. However, the United States census does list Arkansas population based on townships (sometimes referred to as "county subdivisions" or "minor civil divisions"). Townships are also of value for historical purposes in terms of genealogical research. Each town or city is within one or more townships in an Arkansas county based on census maps and publications. The townships of Lawrence County are listed below; listed in parentheses are the cities, towns, and/or census-designated places that are fully or partially inside the township.

- Annieville
- Ashland (Minturn)
- Black River (Powhatan)
- Black Rock (most of Black Rock)
- Boas (Hoxie, part of Walnut Ridge)
- Cache
- Campbell (College City, most of Walnut Ridge)
- Dent (Imboden)
- Duty (Portia, small part of Black Rock)
- Eaton
- Flat Creek
- Jesup
- Lawrence
- Marion (Alicia)
- Morgan (Lynn)
- Promised Land (Sedgwick)
- Reeds Creek (Strawberry)
- Richwoods (small part of Walnut Ridge)
- Spring River (small part of Ravenden)
- Strawberry (Smithville)
- Thacker (most of Ravenden)

== Education ==
Public education is available from four school districts:

- Hillcrest School District
- Hoxie School District
- Lawrence County School District
- Sloan–Hendrix School District

Private college/university education is available from:

- Williams Baptist University

== Communities ==
=== Cities ===
- Black Rock
- Hoxie
- Walnut Ridge (county seat)

=== Towns ===
- Alicia
- College City (former)
- Imboden
- Jesup
- Lynn
- Minturn
- Portia
- Powhatan
- Ravenden
- Sedgwick
- Smithville
- Strawberry

== Infrastructure ==
=== Major highways ===
- I-57
- US 62
- US 63
  - U.S. Route 63B
- US 67
  - U.S. Route 67B
  - U.S. Route 67Y
- U.S. Route 412
- Highway 25
- Highway 34
- Highway 90
- Highway 91
- Highway 115
- Highway 117
  - Highway 117 Spur
- Highway 228
- Highway 230
- Highway 231
- Highway 349
- Highway 361
- Highway 367
- Highway 980

== See also ==
- List of lakes in Lawrence County, Arkansas
- National Register of Historic Places listings in Lawrence County, Arkansas
