= Light, Arkansas =

- Unincorporated community
- Location within Arkansas Location within the United States
- Coordinates: 36°04′12″N 90°44′52″W
- Country: United States
- State: Arkansas
- County: Greene
- Elevation: 262 ft (80 m)
- Time zone: UTC-6 (Central (CST))
  - Summer (DST): UTC-5 (CDT)
- ZIP code: 72439
- Area code: 870
- GNIS feature ID: 77496

Light is an unincorporated community in Greene County, Arkansas, United States. Light is located at the junction of U.S. Route 412 and Arkansas Highway 228, 14.5 miles (23.3 km) west of Paragould. Light has a post office with ZIP code 72439.

The community is named after Daniel Light, a first settler.

== Climate ==
The climate is characterized by relatively high temperatures and evenly distributed precipitation throughout the year. The Köppen Climate Classification subtype for this climate is "Cfa" (Humid Subtropical Climate).

Climate data for Light, Arkansas
Month	Jan	Feb	Mar	Apr	May	Jun	Jul	Aug	Sep	Oct	Nov	Dec	Year
Mean daily maximum °C (°F)	8 (46)	11 (51)	17 (62)	23 (73)	27 (81)	32 (89)	33 (92)	32 (90)	29 (84)	23 (74)	16 (61)	9 (49)	22 (71)
Mean daily minimum °C (°F)	−3 (27)	−1 (31)	4 (40)	10 (50)	14 (58)	19 (66)	21 (70)	20 (68)	16 (61)	9 (49)	4 (40)	−1 (31)	9 (49)
Average precipitation mm (inches)	86 (3.4)	97 (3.8)	130 (5.3)	130 (5.2)	140 (5.4)	94 (3.7)	84 (3.3)	86 (3.4)	100 (4.1)	81 (3.2)	120 (4.9)	130 (5)	1,290 (50.6)
Source: Weatherbase
