= Alicia, Arkansas =

- Town
- Location of Alicia in Lawrence County, Arkansas.
- Coordinates: 35°53′40″N 91°5′1″W
- Country: United States
- State: Arkansas
- County: Lawrence

Area
  - Total: 0.43 sq mi (1.12 km^{2})
  - Land: 0.43 sq mi (1.12 km^{2})
  - Water: 0 sq mi (0.00 km^{2})
- Elevation: 253 ft (77 m)

Population (2020)
  - Total: 143
  - Estimate (2025): 136 ▼
  - Density: 331.1/sq mi (127.84/km^{2})
- Time zone: UTC−6 (Central (CST))
  - Summer (DST): UTC−5 (CDT)
- ZIP code: 72410
- Area code: 870
- FIPS code: 05-00700
- GNIS feature ID: 0045823

Alicia is a town in Lawrence County, Arkansas, United States. As of the 2020 census, Alicia had a population of 143.

== Geography ==
Alicia is located at 35°53′40″N 91°5′1″W (35.894482, -91.083663).

According to the United States Census Bureau, the town has a total area of 0.3 km^{2} (0.12 sq mi), all land.

=== Climate ===
Climate is characterized by relatively high temperatures and evenly distributed precipitation throughout the year. The Köppen climate classification sub-type for this climate is "Cfa" (Humid Subtropical Climate).

Climate data for Alicia, Arkansas (1991–2020 normals, extremes 1905–1919, 1964–present)
Month	Jan	Feb	Mar	Apr	May	Jun	Jul	Aug	Sep	Oct	Nov	Dec	Year
Record high °F (°C)	78 (26)	80 (27)	89 (32)	96 (36)	97 (36)	103 (39)	113 (45)	107 (42)	104 (40)	95 (35)	85 (29)	77 (25)	113 (45)
Mean daily maximum °F (°C)	44.3 (6.8)	49.3 (9.6)	58.7 (14.8)	68.9 (20.5)	77.5 (25.3)	86.3 (30.2)	87.8 (31.0)	87.2 (30.7)	81.6 (27.6)	71.9 (22.2)	58.0 (14.4)	47.4 (8.6)	68.2 (20.1)
Daily mean °F (°C)	36.2 (2.3)	40.2 (4.6)	49.0 (9.4)	58.9 (14.9)	68.4 (20.2)	77.4 (25.2)	79.7 (26.5)	78.2 (25.7)	71.1 (21.7)	60.4 (15.8)	48.3 (9.1)	39.5 (4.2)	58.9 (14.9)
Mean daily minimum °F (°C)	28.1 (−2.2)	31.1 (−0.5)	39.3 (4.1)	48.9 (9.4)	59.2 (15.1)	68.5 (20.3)	71.6 (22.0)	69.1 (20.6)	60.6 (15.9)	48.9 (9.4)	38.6 (3.7)	31.6 (−0.2)	49.6 (9.8)
Record low °F (°C)	−14 (−26)	−9 (−23)	13 (−11)	26 (−3)	32 (0)	44 (7)	46 (8)	48 (9)	33 (1)	22 (−6)	12 (−11)	−10 (−23)	−14 (−26)
Average precipitation inches (mm)	3.43 (87)	3.33 (85)	4.45 (113)	5.22 (133)	4.94 (125)	3.07 (78)	3.65 (93)	3.64 (92)	3.37 (86)	3.64 (92)	4.14 (105)	4.63 (118)	47.51 (1,207)
Average snowfall inches (cm)	1.3 (3.3)	1.1 (2.8)	0.7 (1.8)	0.0 (0.0)	0.0 (0.0)	0.0 (0.0)	0.0 (0.0)	0.0 (0.0)	0.0 (0.0)	0.0 (0.0)	0.1 (0.25)	0.3 (0.76)	3.5 (8.9)
Average precipitation days (≥ 0.01 in)	6.8	6.9	8.2	8.2	8.7	6.5	6.3	5.9	4.8	6.3	6.6	7.4	82.6
Average snowy days (≥ 0.1 in)	0.5	0.7	0.4	0.0	0.0	0.0	0.0	0.0	0.0	0.0	0.0	0.3	1.9
Source: NOAA

== Demographics ==
Historical population
Census	Pop.	Note	%±
1900	150		—
1910	168		12.0%
1920	297		76.8%
1930	342		15.2%
1940	333		−2.6%
1950	299		−10.2%
1960	236		−21.1%
1970	246		4.2%
1980	246		0.0%
1990	157		−36.2%
2000	145		−7.6%
2010	124		−14.5%
2020	143		15.3%
2025 (est.)	136	▼	−4.9%
U.S. Decennial Census

As of the census of 2000, there were 145 people, 53 households and 46 families residing in the town. The population density was 430.7 people/km^{2} (1,116 people/mi^{2}). There were 61 housing units at an average density of 181.2 units/km^{2} (469 units/mi^{2}). The racial makeup of the town was 100.00% White.

There were 53 households, out of which 26.4% had children under the age of 18 living with them, 67.9% were married couples living together, 13.2% had a female householder with no husband present, and 13.2% were non-families. 13.2% of all households were made up of individuals, and 3.8% had someone who was living alone who was age 65 or older. The average household size was 2.74 and the average family size was 2.96.

In the town, the age distribution of the population showed 24.8% under the age of 18, 9.7% from 18 to 24, 24.1% from 25 to 44, 25.5% from 45 to 64, and 15.9% who were 65 years of age or older. The median age was 37 years. For every 100 females, there were 107.1 males. For every 100 females age 18 and over, there were 98.2 males.

The median income for a household in the town was $20,833, and the median income for a family was $22,083. Males had a median income of $20,250, compared with $25,313 for females. The per capita income for the town was $12,942. About 10.0% of families and 20.4% of the population were living below the poverty line, including 72.2% of residents under 18 and none of those over 64.

== Education ==
It is a part of the Lawrence County School District, which operates Walnut Ridge High School.

It was formerly a part of the Walnut Ridge School District, until it merged with the Black Rock School District into the Lawrence County district on July 1, 2006.

== Infrastructure ==
=== Highways ===
- I-57 / US 67
- Highway 230
