= Sedgwick, Arkansas =

- Town
- Location in Lawrence County, Arkansas
- Coordinates: 35°58′44″N 90°51′46″W
- Country: United States
- State: Arkansas
- County: Lawrence

Area
  - Total: 0.52 sq mi (1.35 km^{2})
  - Land: 0.52 sq mi (1.35 km^{2})
  - Water: 0 sq mi (0.00 km^{2})
- Elevation: 262 ft (80 m)

Population (2020)
  - Total: 163
  - Estimate (2026): 152 ▼
  - Density: 313.8/sq mi (121.16/km^{2})
- Time zone: UTC-6 (Central (CST))
  - Summer (DST): UTC-5 (CDT)
- ZIP code: 72465
- Area code: 870
- FIPS code: 05-63110
- GNIS feature ID: 0058595

Sedgwick is a town in Lawrence County, Arkansas, United States. As of the 2020 census, Sedgwick had a population of 163.

== History ==
About 1881 George Washington Sedgwick, president of the Sedgwick Tie Company, "established a sawmill on the Cache River in Lawrence County, Arkansas, and a small town was established named Sedgwick, Ark."

== Geography ==
Sedgwick is in eastern Lawrence County, less than 1 mile (1.6 km) west of the Cache River, which forms the Lawrence County/Greene County line.

U.S. Route 63 passes through the town, leading northwest 10 miles (16 km) to Hoxie and southeast 14 miles (23 km) to Jonesboro. Arkansas Highway 228 leads northeast from Sedgwick 9 miles (14 km) to U.S. Route 412 at Light.

== Demographics ==
Historical population
Census	Pop.	Note	%±
1900	309		—
1910	96		−68.9%
1920	195		103.1%
1930	137		−29.7%
1940	352		156.9%
1950	196		−44.3%
1960	206		5.1%
1970	168		−18.4%
1980	205		22.0%
1990	86		−58.0%
2000	112		30.2%
2010	152		35.7%
2020	163		7.2%
2025 (est.)	157	▼	−3.7%
U.S. Decennial Census

As of the census of 2000, there were 112 people, 44 households, and 31 families residing in the town. The population density was 818.5 inhabitants per square mile (316.0/km^{2}). There were 51 housing units at an average density of 372.7 per square mile (143.9/km^{2}). The racial makeup of the town was 98.21% White, 0.89% Black or African American and 0.89% Native American.

There were 44 households, out of which 27.3% had children under the age of 18 living with them, 61.4% were married couples living together, 6.8% had a female householder with no husband present, and 27.3% were non-families. 25.0% of all households were made up of individuals, and 13.6% had someone living alone who was 65 years of age or older. The average household size was 2.55 and the average family size was 3.03.

In the town, the population was spread out, with 23.2% under the age of 18, 12.5% from 18 to 24, 29.5% from 25 to 44, 17.0% from 45 to 64, and 17.9% who were 65 years of age or older. The median age was 35 years. For every 100 females, there were 124.0 males. For every 100 females age 18 and over, there were 104.8 males.

The median income for a household in the town was $20,417, and the median income for a family was $25,417. Males had a median income of $25,000 versus $18,750 for females. The per capita income for the town was $11,988. There were no families and 4.0% of the population living below the poverty line, including no under eighteens and 22.2% of those over 64.
