= Arkansas Highway 980 =

Highway designation in Arkansas

Highway 980

Route information
- Maintained by AHTD

Location
- Country: United States
- State: Arkansas

Highway system
- Arkansas Highway System; Interstate; US; State; Business; Spurs; Suffixed; Scenic; Heritage
← AR 959	→ AR 1

Highway 980 (AR 980, Ark. 980, and Hwy. 980) is a state highway designation for all state maintained airport roads in Arkansas.

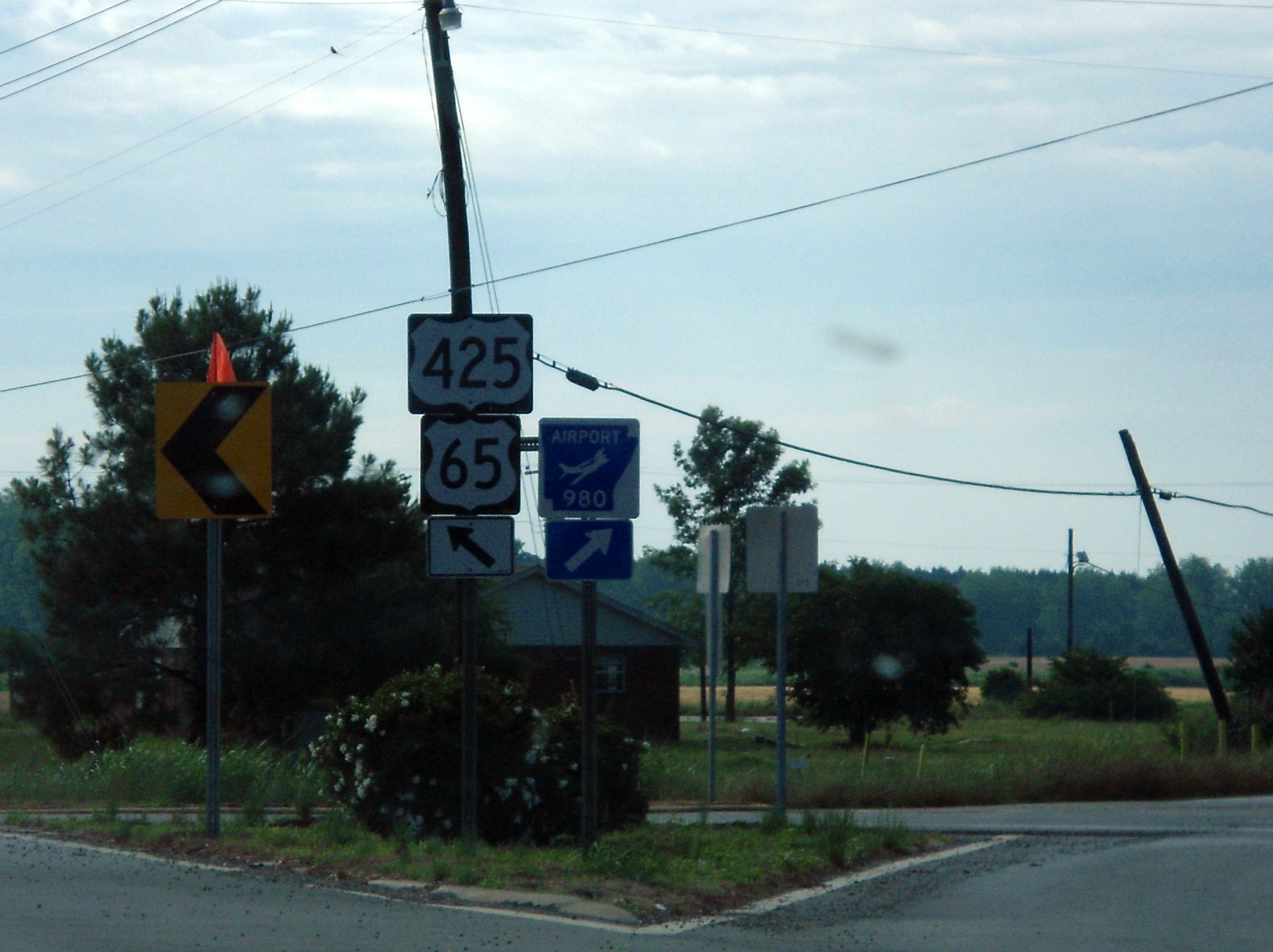
Highway 980 splits from US 65/US 425 in Pine Bluff. This segment runs to Grider Field.

== List of routes ==
=== Arkansas County ===
==== Almyra ====
Highway 980
- Location: Almyra Municipal Airport, Almyra
- Length: 2.78 mi (4.47 km)

Arkansas Highway 980 is a state highway of 2.78 miles (4.47 km) in Arkansas County. It connects Arkansas Highway 130 with Almyra Municipal Airport in Almyra.

==== Section 2 ====
Highway 980
- Location: De Witt Municipal Airport, De Witt
- Length: 1.93 mi (3.11 km)

Arkansas Highway 980 is a state highway of 1.93 miles (3.11 km) in Arkansas County. It connects U.S. Route 165 with De Witt Municipal Airport in south De Witt.

=== Benton County ===
Highway 980
- Location: Smith Field, Siloam Springs
- Length: 0.20 mi (320 m)

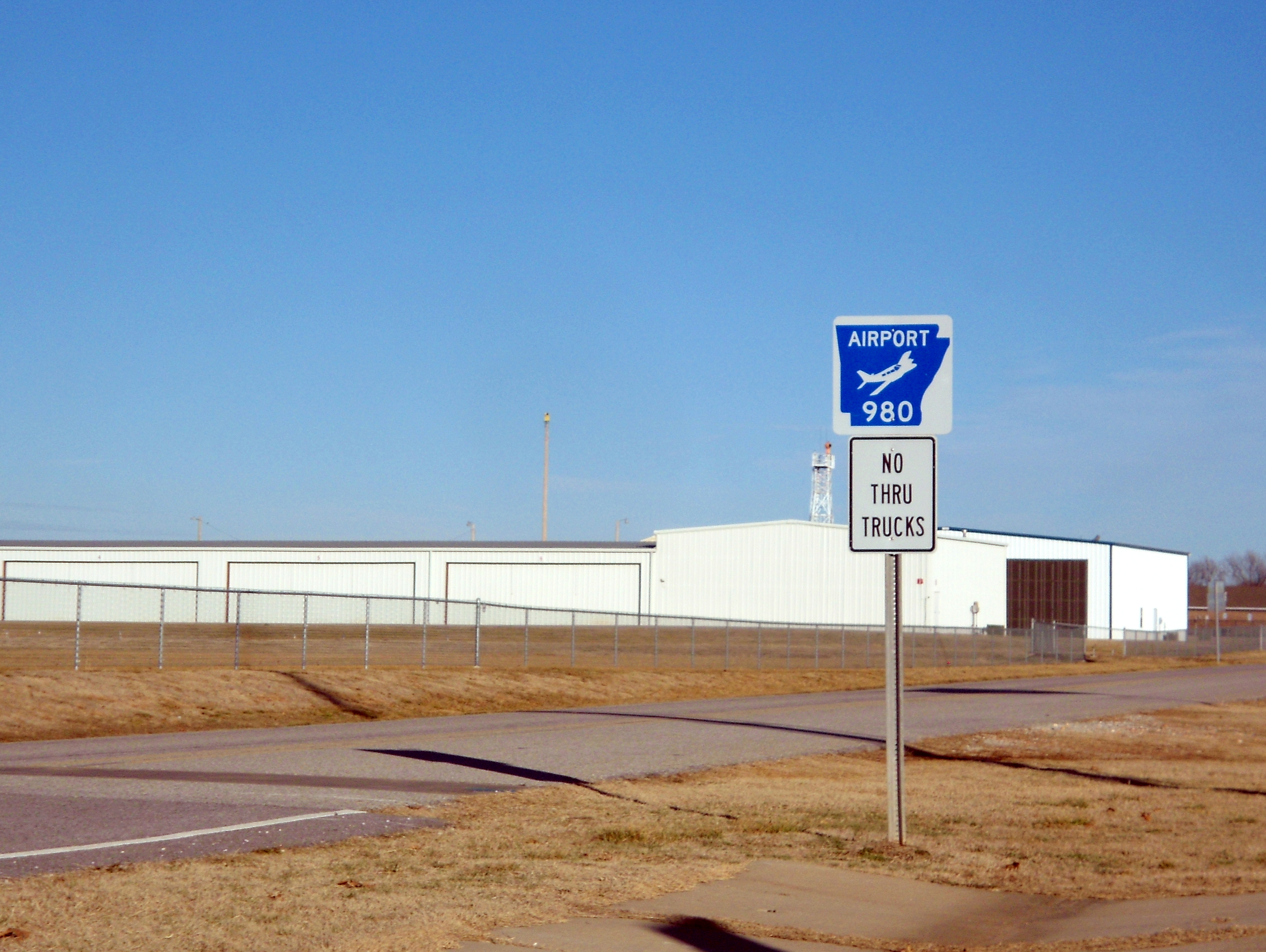
Airport access road to Smith Field

Arkansas Highway 980 is a state highway of 0.20 miles (0.32 km) in Benton County. It connects AR 59 with Smith Field in Siloam Springs.

=== Boone County ===
Highway 980
- Location: Boone County Airport, Harrison
- Length: 0.45 mi (720 m)
- Existed: March 26, 1975–present

Highway 980 is a state highway of 0.45 miles (0.72 km) in Boone County. It connects US 62/US 65/US 412 with the Boone County Airport in Harrison.

History

The highway was designated by the Arkansas State Highway Commission on March 26, 1975.

Major intersections

The entire route is in Harrison, Boone County.

mi	km	Destinations	Notes
0.00	0.00	US 62 / US 65 / US 412	Northern terminus
0.45	0.72	End state maintenance at Boone County Regional Airport, roadway continues as Airport Road	Southern terminus
1.000 mi = 1.609 km; 1.000 km = 0.621 mi

=== Bradley County ===
Highway 980
- Location: Warren Municipal Airport, Warren
- Length: 0.52 mi (840 m)

Arkansas Highway 980 is a state highway of 0.52 miles (0.84 km) in Bradley County. It connects US 63/AR 8 with the Warren Municipal Airport south of Warren.

=== Carroll County ===
Highway 980
- Location: Carroll County Airport, Berryville
- Length: 0.60 mi (970 m)

Arkansas Highway 980 is a state highway of 0.60 miles (0.97 km) in Carroll County. It connects US 62 with the Carroll County Airport near Berryville.

=== Chicot County ===
==== Section 1 ====
Highway 980
- Location: Dermott Municipal Airport, Dermott
- Length: 0.22 mi (350 m)

Arkansas Highway 980 is a state highway of 0.22 miles (0.35 km) in Chicot County. It connects US 165 with the Dermott Municipal Airport near Dermott.

==== Section 2 ====
Highway 980
- Location: Lake Village Municipal Airport, Lake Village
- Length: 1.70 mi (2.74 km)

Arkansas Highway 980 is a state highway of 1.70 miles (2.74 km) in Chicot County. It connects US 65 with the Lake Village Municipal Airpott Municipal Airport near Lake Village.

=== Clay County ===
==== Section 1 ====
Highway 980
- Location: Corning Municipal Airport, Berryville
- Length: 0.41 mi (660 m)

Arkansas Highway 980 is a state highway of 0.41 miles (0.66 km) in Clay County. It connects US 62/US 67 (Future I-57) with the Corning Municipal Airport near Corning.

==== Section 2 ====
Highway 980
- Location: Rector Airport, Rector
- Length: 0.31 mi (500 m)

Arkansas Highway 980 is a state highway of 0.31 miles (0.50 km) in Clay County. It connects US 49/AR 1 with the Rector Airport near Rector.

=== Cleburne County ===
Highway 980
- Location: Heber Springs Municipal Airport, Heber Springs
- Length: 0.36 mi (580 m)
- Existed: March 22, 1972–present

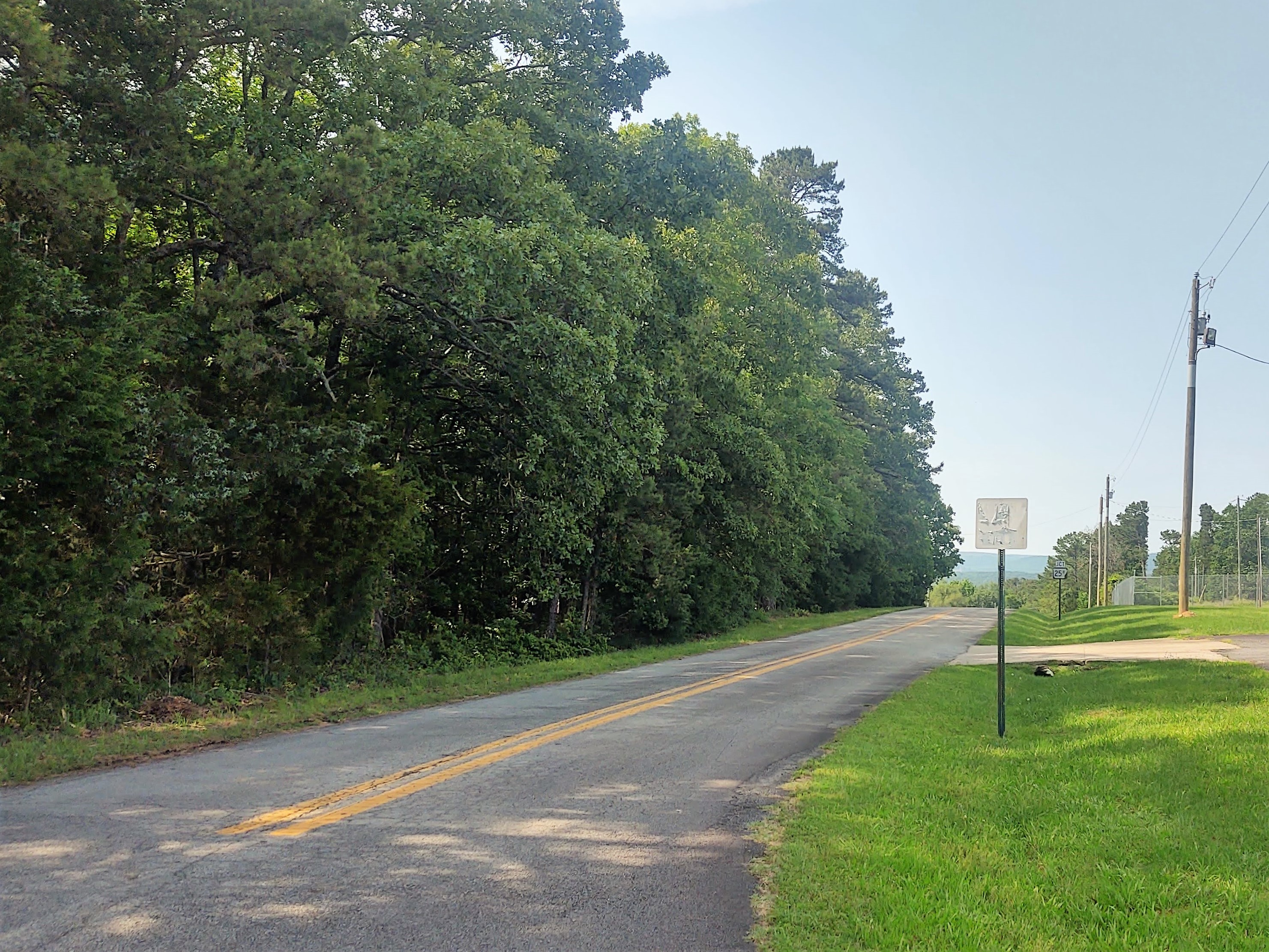

Highway 980 is a state highway of 0.36 miles (0.58 km) in Cleburne County. It connects Highway 25 Business (AR 25B) with the Heber Springs Municipal Airport in Heber Springs.

History

The highway was designated by the Arkansas State Highway Commission on March 22, 1972.

Major intersections

The entire route is in Heber Springs, Cleburne County.

mi	km	Destinations	Notes
0.00	0.00	AR 25B (Heber Springs Road)	Northern terminus
0.36	0.58	Heber Springs Municipal Airport	Southern terminus
1.000 mi = 1.609 km; 1.000 km = 0.621 mi

=== Columbia County ===
Highway 980
- Location: Magnolia Municipal Airport
- Length: 0.66 mi (1,060 m)

Arkansas Highway 980 is a state highway of 0.66 miles (1.06 km) in Columbia County. The route connects U.S. Route 79 with Magnolia Municipal Airport south of Magnolia.

=== Conway County ===
Highway 980
- Location: Morrilton Airport, Morrilton
- Length: 0.73 mi (1,170 m)

Arkansas Highway 980 is a state highway of 0.73 miles (1.17 km) in Conway County. It connects AR 9 with the Morrilton Airport in Morrilton.

=== Cross County ===
Highway 980
- Location: Wynne Municipal Airport, Wynne
- Length: 1.33 mi (2.14 km)

Arkansas Highway 980 is a state highway of 1.33 miles (2.14 km) in Cross County. The route connects Arkansas Highway 1 with Wynne Municipal Airport in Wynne.

=== Desha County ===
==== Section 1 ====
Highway 980
- Location: McGehee Municipal Airport, McGehee
- Length: 0.82 mi (1,320 m)

Arkansas Highway 980 is a state highway of 0.82 miles (1.32 km) in Desha County. The route connects Arkansas Highway 4 with McGehee Municipal Airport in McGehee. The route was shortened on January 7, 2009.

==== Section 2 ====
Highway 980
- Location: Billy Free Municipal Airport
- Length: 0.49 mi (790 m)

Arkansas Highway 980 is a state highway of 0.49 miles (0.79 km) in Desha County. The route connects Arkansas Highway 54 with Billy Free Municipal Airport near Dumas.

=== Drew County ===
Highway 980
- Location: Monticello Municipal Airport, Monticello
- Length: 0.50 mi (800 m)

Arkansas Highway 980 is a state highway of 0.50 miles (0.80 km) in Drew County. The route connects U.S. Route 278 with Ellis Field in east Monticello.

=== Fulton County ===
Highway 980
- Location: Salem Airport, Salem
- Length: 0.40 mi (640 m)

Arkansas Highway 980 is a state highway of 0.40 miles (0.64 km) in Fulton County. It connects AR 9 with the Salem Airport in Salem.

=== Howard County ===
Highway 980
- Location: Howard County Airport
- Length: 3.58 mi (5.76 km)

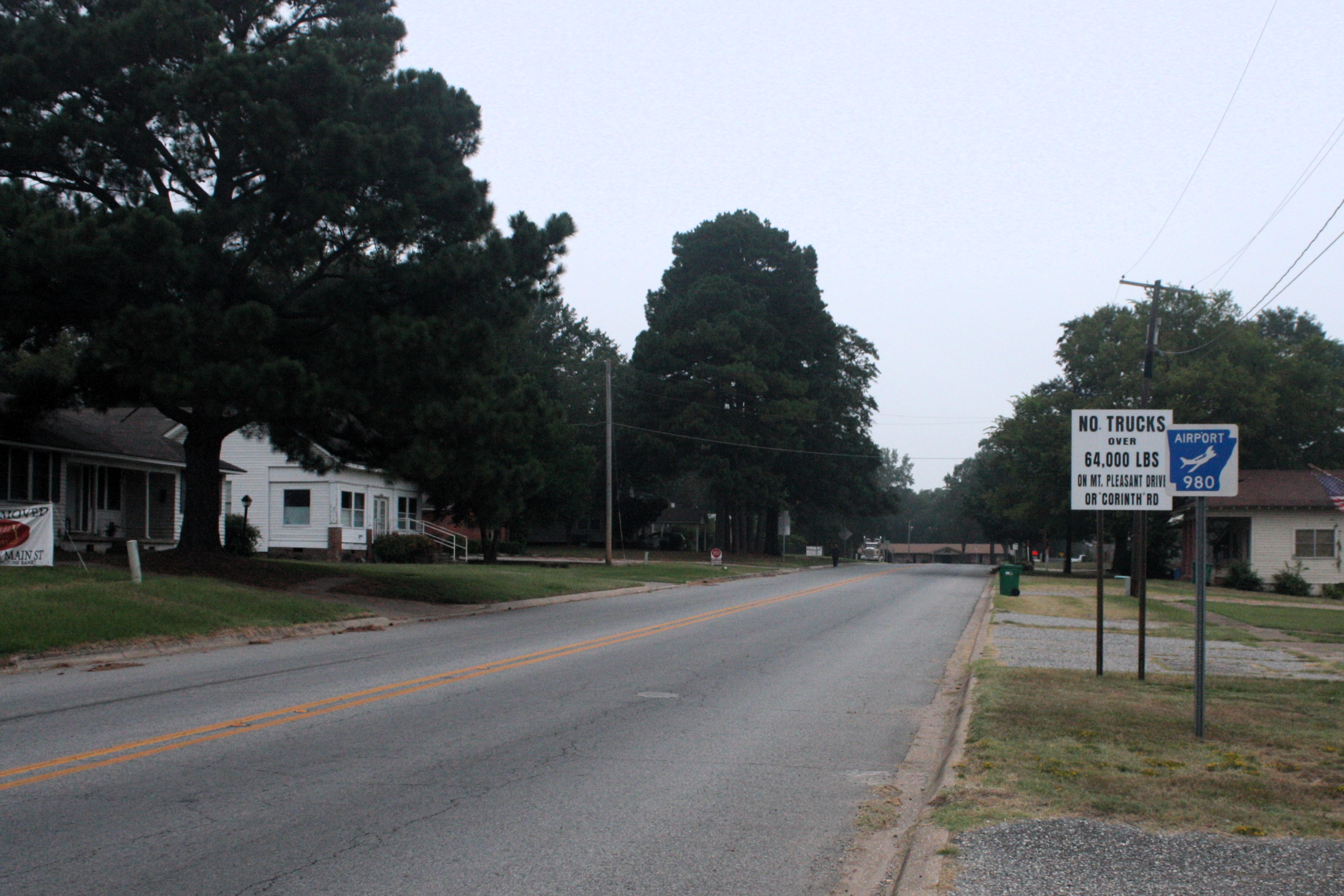
AR 980 runs north in Nashville, Arkansas

Arkansas Highway 980 is a state highway of 3.58 miles (5.76 km) in Howard County. The route connects U.S. Route 371 with Howard County Airport north of Nashville.

=== Lawrence County ===
Highway 980
- Location: Walnut Ridge Regional Airport, College City
- Length: 1.89 mi (3.04 km)

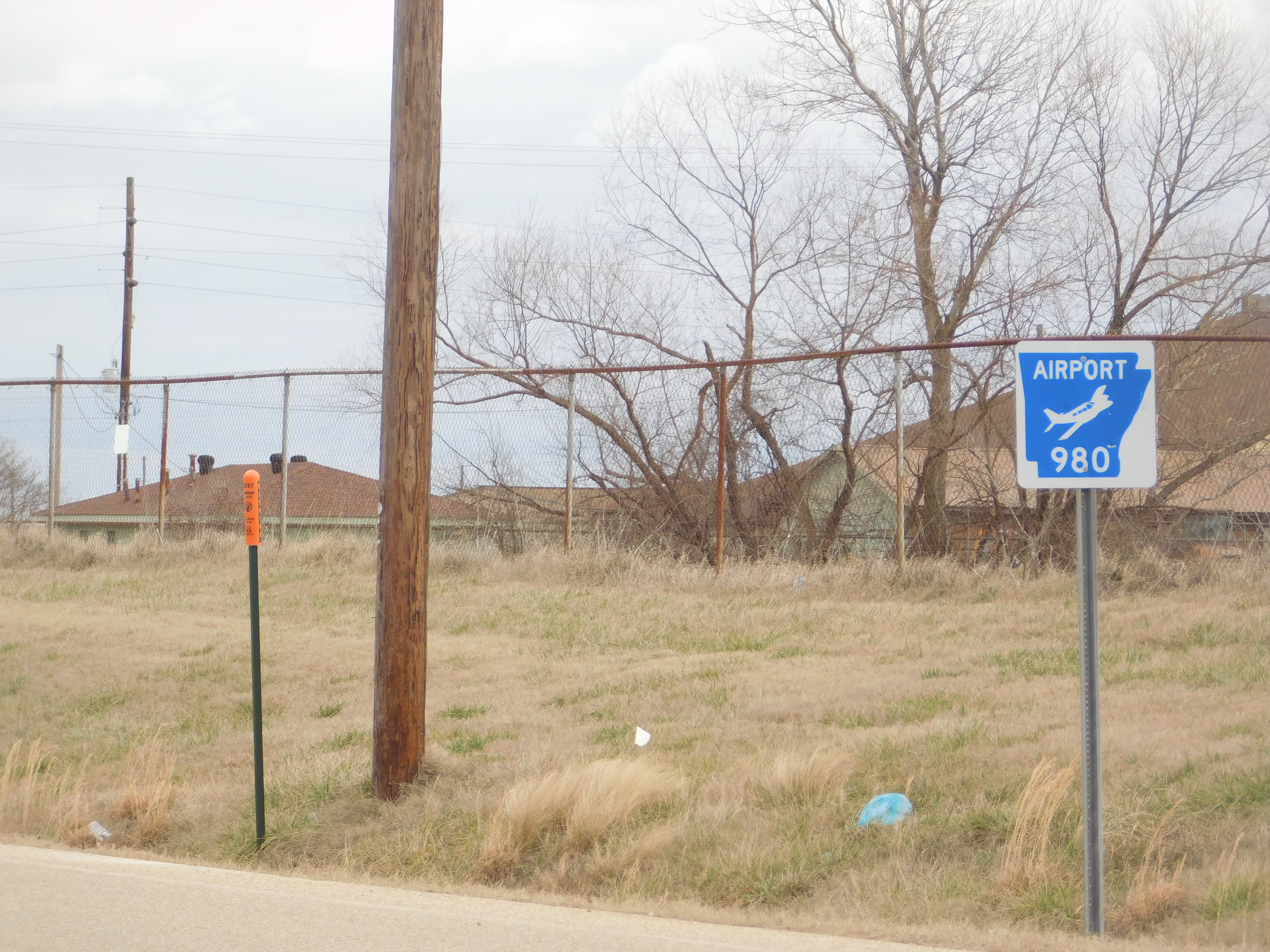
AR 980 in Walnut Ridge

Arkansas Highway 980 is a state highway of 1.89 miles (3.04 km) in Lawrence County. It connects US 67 with the Walnut Ridge Regional Airport in College City.

=== Madison County ===
Highway 980
- Location: Huntsville - Madison County Municipal Airport, Huntsville
- Length: 1.13 mi (1.82 km)

Arkansas Highway 980 is a state highway of 1.13 miles (1.82 km) in Madison County. It connects AR 74 with the Huntsville - Madison County Municipal Airport in Huntsville.

=== Marion County ===
Highway 980
- Location: Marion County Regional Airport, Flippin
- Length: 1.17 mi (1.88 km)

Arkansas Highway 980 is a state highway of 1.17 miles (1.88 km) in Marion County. It connects AR 178 with the Marion County Regional Airport in Flippin.

=== Polk County ===
Highway 980
- Location: Mena Intermountain Municipal Airport, Mena
- Length: 0.36 mi (580 m)

Arkansas Highway 980 is a state highway of 0.4 miles (0.64 km) in Polk County. It connects Arkansas Highway 8 with the Mena Intermountain Municipal Airport in Mena.

=== Van Buren County ===
Highway 980
- Location: Clinton Municipal Airport, Clinton
- Length: 1.0 mi (1.6 km)

Arkansas Highway 980 is a state highway of 1.0 mile (1.6 km) in Van Buren County. It connects AR 16 with the Clinton Municipal Airport in Clinton.

== Former routing ==
Highway 980
- Location: Ozark Regional Airport, Midway
- Length: 0.2 mi (320 m)
- Existed: April 27, 2007

Arkansas Highway 980 was a state highway of 0.2 miles (0.32 km) in Baxter County. It connected AR 126 with Ozark Regional Airport in Midway. It was removed from the State Highway system on April 27, 2007.
