= Lynn, Arkansas =

- Town
- Location in Lawrence County, Arkansas
- Coordinates: 36°0′24″N 91°15′8″W
- Country: United States
- State: Arkansas
- County: Lawrence

Area
  - Total: 2.31 sq mi (5.99 km^{2})
  - Land: 2.31 sq mi (5.99 km^{2})
  - Water: 0 sq mi (0.00 km^{2})
- Elevation: 358 ft (109 m)

Population (2020)
  - Total: 258
  - Estimate (2025): 242 ▼
  - Density: 111.6/sq mi (43.07/km^{2})
- Time zone: UTC-6 (Central (CST))
  - Summer (DST): UTC-5 (CDT)
- ZIP code: 72440
- Area code: 870
- FIPS code: 05-42260
- GNIS feature ID: 0051525

Lynn is a town in Lawrence County, Arkansas, United States. As of the 2020 census, Lynn had a population of 258.

== Geography ==
Lynn is located in western Lawrence County at 36°0′24″N 91°15′8″W (36.006640, -91.252121).

According to the United States Census Bureau, the town has a total area of 2.3 square miles (6.0 km^{2}), all land.

=== Highways ===
- Highway 25 is Lynn's Main Street. It leads northeast 13 miles (21 km) to Black Rock and southwest 5 miles (8 km) to Strawberry.
- Highway 361 leads south out of Lynn 8 miles (13 km) to Saffell.

== Demographics ==
Historical population
Census	Pop.	Note	%±
1970	274		—
1980	345		25.9%
1990	299		−13.3%
2000	315		5.4%
2010	288		−8.6%
2020	258		−10.4%
2025 (est.)	242	▼	−6.2%
U.S. Decennial Census

As of the census of 2000, there were 315 people, 136 households, and 96 families residing in the town. The population density was 50.5 people/km^{2} (131 people/mi^{2}). There were 151 housing units at an average density of 24.2 units/km^{2} (63 units/mi^{2}). The racial makeup of the town was 97.46% White, 0.95% from other races, and 1.59% from two or more races. 0.63% of the population were Hispanic or Latino of any race.

There were 136 households, out of which 29.4% had children under the age of 18 living with them, 54.4% were married couples living together, 14.7% had a female householder with no husband present, and 29.4% were non-families. 26.5% of all households were made up of individuals, and 16.9% had someone living alone who was 65 years of age or older. The average household size was 2.32 and the average family size was 2.74.

In the town, the population was spread out, with 25.1% under the age of 18, 7.6% from 18 to 24, 26.0% from 25 to 44, 23.5% from 45 to 64, and 17.8% who were 65 years of age or older. The median age was 39 years. For every 100 females, there were 90.9 males. For every 100 females age 18 and over, there were 85.8 males.

The median income for a household in the town was $22,778, and the median income for a family was $27,375. Males had a median income of $29,688 versus $20,625 for females. The per capita income for the town was $14,409. About 8.4% of families and 13.9% of the population were below the poverty line, including 9.0% of those under age 18 and 28.6% of those age 65 or over.

== Education ==
Hillcrest School District operates area schools, including Hillcrest Elementary School in Lynn and Hillcrest High School in Strawberry. On July 1, 2004, the Lynn School District combined with the River Valley School District to form the Hillcrest School District. Home of the Screamin' Eagles.
