= Poughkeepsie, Arkansas =

Unincorporated community in Arkansas, US

Coordinates: 36°04′36″N 91°28′45″W

Poughkeepsie (Pronounced locally as Pow-keeps-ee) is an unincorporated community in Sharp County, Arkansas, United States. The community is located in south central Sharp County, one mile south of the Strawberry River. The community is on Arkansas Highway 56 approximately six miles east of Evening Shade.

== Education ==
Hillcrest School District operates area schools which serve Poughkeepsie, including Hillcrest Elementary School in Lynn and Hillcrest High School in Strawberry.

The River Valley School District formed on July 1, 1992, by the merger of the Poughkeepsie School District and the Strawberry School District. On July 1, 2004, River Valley merged with the Lynn School District to form the Hillcrest School District.
