= Warren Airport =

Warren Airport may refer to:

- Warren Airport (New South Wales) in Warren, New South Wales, Australia (ICAO: YWRN)
- Warren Airport (Ohio) in Warren, Ohio, United States (FAA: 62D)
- Washington–Warren Airport in Washington, North Carolina, United States (ICAO: KOCW)
- Youngstown–Warren Regional Airport in Trumbull County, Ohio, United States (FAA: YNG)
- Warren Airport (Michigan) in Macomb County, Michigan, United States

== See also ==
- Warren Municipal Airport (disambiguation)
- Warren County Airport (disambiguation)
