= Richard Bell (American football coach) =

American football player and coach (1937–2025)

- Bell at Georgia Tech, c. 1966

Biographical details
- Born: September 2, 1937; Camden, Arkansas, U.S.
- Died: December 13, 2025 (aged 88); Woodstock, Georgia, U.S.

Playing career
- 1956–1959: Arkansas
- Positions: End, guard

Coaching career (HC unless noted)
- 1960–1961: Walnut Ridge HS (AR)
- 1962–1963: VMI (assistant)
- 1964–1967: Georgia Tech (LB)
- 1968–1969: West Virginia (DC)
- 1970–1974: Texas Tech (DC)
- 1975–1981: South Carolina (DC)
- 1982: South Carolina
- 1983–1987: Duke (DC)
- 1988: East Carolina (DC)
- 1989–1993: Georgia (DC/S)
- 1994: Navy (DC/LB)
- 1995–2006: Air Force (DC)
- 2010–2017: Prince Avenue Christian (GA) (DC)

Head coaching record
- Overall: 4–7 (college)

Richard Murry Bell (September 2, 1937 – December 13, 2025) was an American college football coach and end. He served as head football coach at the University of South Carolina for a single season in 1982. While playing at the University of Arkansas, Bell played for head coaches Jack Mitchell in his last two seasons as head coach, and Frank Broyles in his first two seasons. He went on to coach for various high schools and colleges and work for several Hall of Fame coaches.

== Early life and education ==
Richard Murry Bell was born in Camden, Arkansas, on September 2, 1937, to Alton and Maureen Bell. He played football at Little Rock Central High School where he was a two-year letterman and made the second All-State team. He was also named the team's most valuable player.

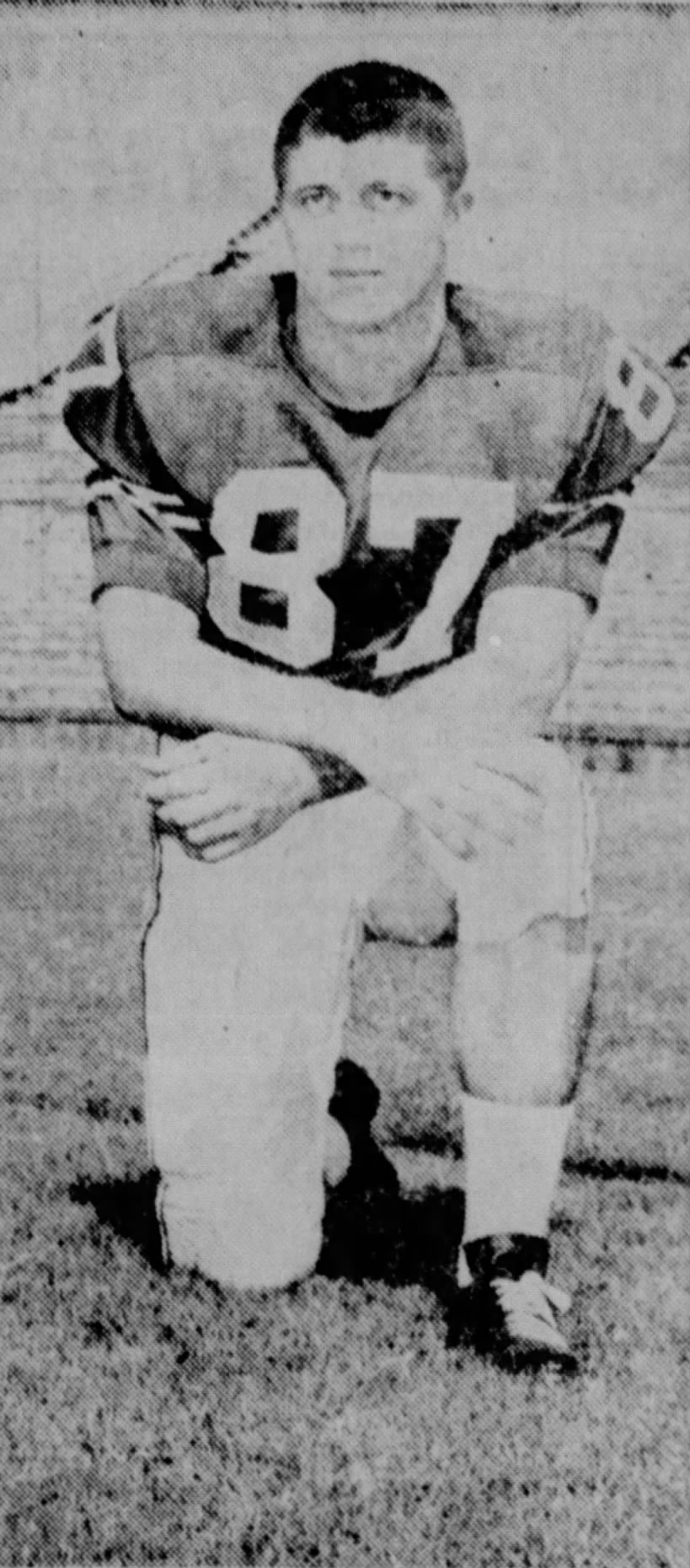
Bell at Arkansas in 1958

Bell played as an offensive lineman for the University of Arkansas Razorbacks, at both the guard and end positions. During his senior year, the Razorbacks finished the season 9–2, won a share of the 1959 Southwest Conference championship, and beat Georgia Tech in the 1960 Gator Bowl, while Bell served as a graduate assistant and as a team captain.

== Coaching career ==
After he graduated from the University of Arkansas, Bell began his coaching career in 1960 at Walnut Ridge High School. He then moved up to the college level in 1962 to coach at Virginia Military Institute. From there he coached at Georgia Tech, West Virginia, Texas Tech and South Carolina as a defensive coach. On January 9, 1982, Bell was formally introduced as the 27th head coach in the history of the South Carolina program. Bell had previously served for seven seasons as the Gamecocks defensive coordinator under previous head coach Jim Carlen. After a single season, Bell was fired by athletic director Bob Marcum on December 1, 1982.

From South Carolina, Bell served as a defensive coach at several other schools. These schools included Duke, East Carolina, Georgia, Navy and Air Force. Bell retired as a collegiate coach after the 2006 season, after 42 years as a coach. After four years in retirement, Bell reentered the coaching world to serve as the defensive coordinator at Prince Avenue Christian School in Bogart, Georgia in 2010. He retired after the 2017 season.

== Personal life and death ==
Bell was married to Marilyn, and had four children. He died in Woodstock, Georgia, on December 13, 2025, at the age of 88. He had been staying in an assisted living facility.

== Head coaching record ==
=== College ===
Year	Team	Overall	Bowl/playoffs
South Carolina Gamecocks (NCAA Division I-A independent) (1982)
1982	South Carolina	4–7	
South Carolina:		4–7	
Total:		4–7	
