= Corey Walker =

American football player (born 1973)

No. 29, 20
- Position: Running back

Personal information
- Born: June 4, 1973 (age 53); Memphis, Tennessee, U.S.
- Listed height: 5 ft 10 in (1.78 m)
- Listed weight: 188 lb (85 kg)

Career information
- High school: Hillcrest (Strawberry, Arkansas)
- College: Arkansas State
- NFL draft: 1997: undrafted

Career history
- Philadelphia Eagles (1997–1998); Seattle Seahawks (2000)*; Oakland Raiders (2001)*; → Frankfurt Galaxy (2001)
- * Offseason or practice squad member only
- Stats at Pro Football Reference

Corey Walker (born June 4, 1973) is an American former professional football running back who played for the Philadelphia Eagles of the National Football League (NFL). He played college football for the Arkansas State Indians.

== Early life ==
Corey Walker was born on June 4, 1973, in Memphis, Tennessee. He attended Hillcrest High School in Strawberry, Arkansas.

== College career ==
Walker enrolled at Arkansas State University to play college football for the Indians. He only played in two games in 1993. He was then a three-year letterman from 1994 to 1996. Walker recorded college career totals of 549 carries for 2,340 yards and 20 touchdowns, 90 receptions for 730 yards and seven touchdowns, and 51 kick returns for 1,190 yards and one touchdown. His 25.5 yards-per-return was the highest in the Big West Conference in 1995.

== Professional career ==
After going undrafted in the 1998 NFL draft, Walker signed with the Philadelphia Eagles on April 22. He was placed on injured reserve on August 19, where he spent the entire 1997 season. He appeared in 14 games in 1998 as a backup running back and special teams player, totaling 12 rushing attempts for 55 yards, two catches for 35 yards on two targets, and eight kick returns for 150 yards. Walker became a free agent after the 1998 season and re-signed with the Eagles on July 12, 1999. He was released on September 5 after the final preseason game of the 1999 season.

Walker was signed by the Seattle Seahawks on February 23, 2000. He was released with an injury settlement on August 29, 2000.

Walker signed with the Oakland Raiders on February 14, 2001. He was allocated to NFL Europe to play for the Frankfurt Galaxy as a cornerback. He played in all ten games, starting one, for the Galaxy during the 2001 NFL Europe season, posting ten tackles on defense, five special teams tackles, one pass breakup, 21 kick returns for 477 yards and one touchdown, and three punt returns for 12 yards. Walker was released by the Raiders on September 2, 2001, after the final preseason game.
