= Wings of Honor Museum =

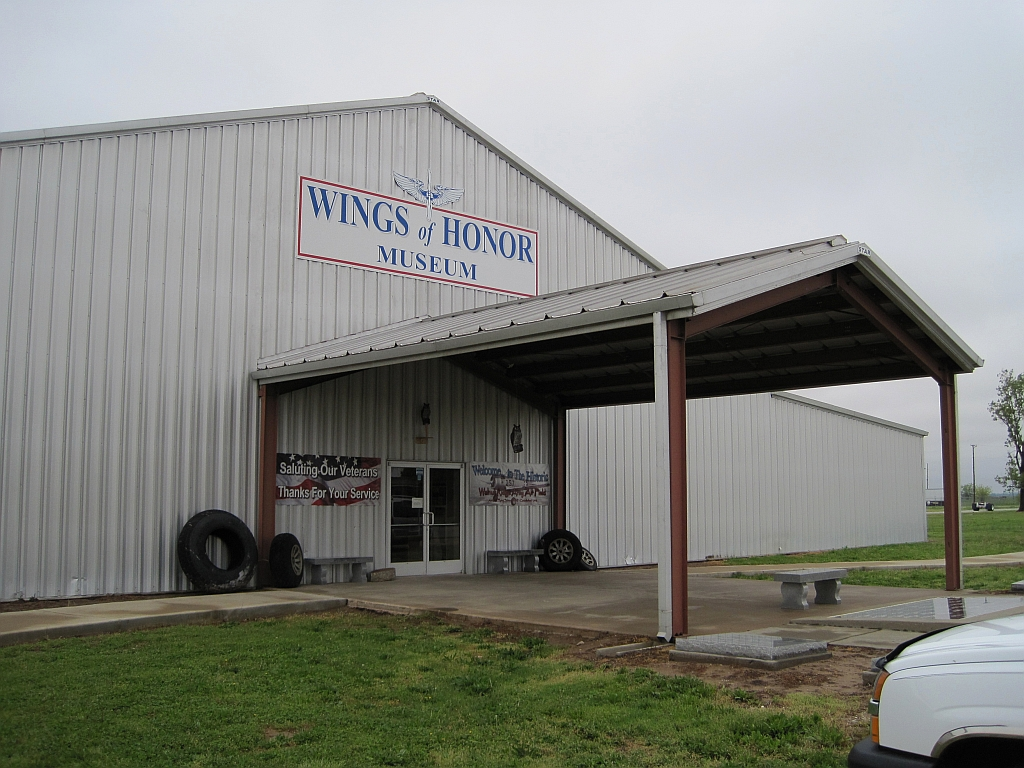
- Museum entrance

- Location within Arkansas
- Former name: Walnut Ridge Army Flying School Museum
- Established: 1999
- Location: Walnut Ridge, Arkansas
- Coordinates: 36.1246°N 90.9277°W
- Type: Aviation museum
- Website: www.wingsofhonor.org

The Wings of Honor Museum is an aviation museum located at the Walnut Ridge Regional Airport in Walnut Ridge, Arkansas.

== History ==
The museum originally opened as the Walnut Ridge Army Flying School Museum in 1999. It moved to a larger building in 2006. Two 1,600 sq ft (150 m^{2}) expansions were opened in 2013 and 2015. In 2018, it located a BT-13 that had been based at Walnut Ridge Army Airfield and began raising money to purchase it. Following an anonymous donation, the museum was able to acquire the aircraft and it was delivered to the museum in October 2022. By that time the museum also managed to acquire a second BT-13.

== Exhibits ==
Exhibits at the museum include the Vietnam War, underaged soldiers, Women in World War II and cleanup after the atomic testing at Enewetak Atoll.

== Collection ==
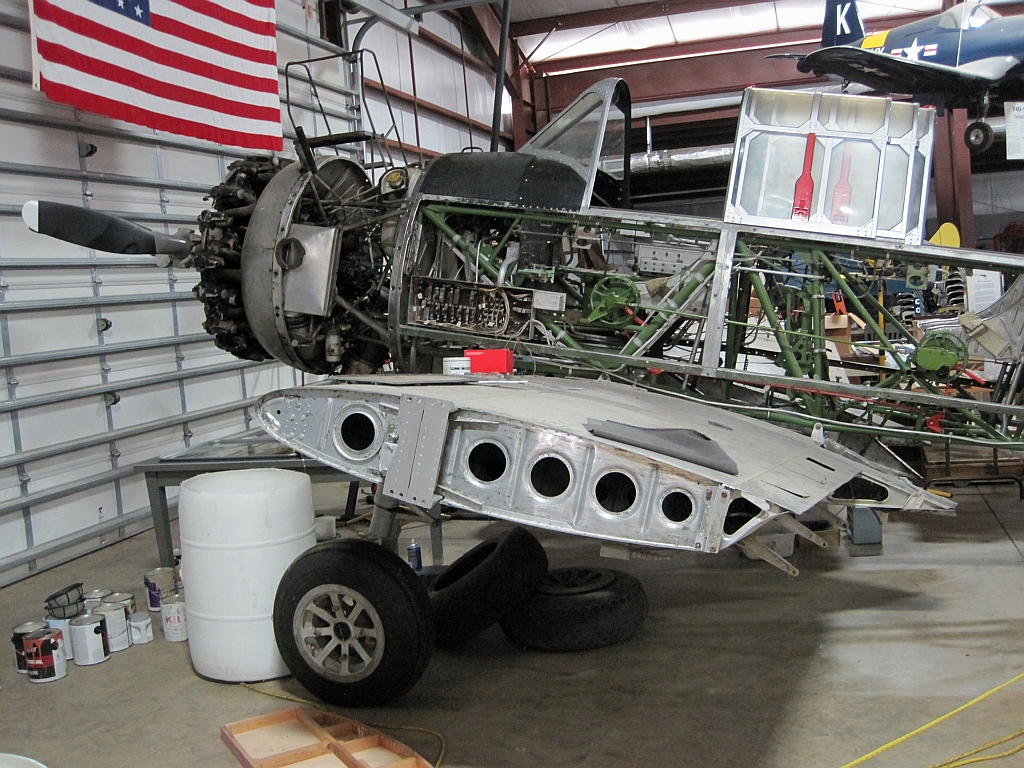
Vultee BT-13 Valiant

- Vultee BT-13 Valiant
- Vultee SNV-2

== Events ==
The museum holds an annual reunion.

== Programs ==
The museum conducted oral history interviews with local veterans as part of its Arkansas Valor Series.
