= Saffell, Arkansas =

- Unincorporated community
- Location within Arkansas Location within the United States
- Coordinates: 35°55′11″N 91°17′24″W
- Country: United States
- State: Arkansas
- County: Lawrence
- Elevation: 276 ft (84 m)
- Time zone: UTC-6 (Central (CST))
  - Summer (DST): UTC-5 (CDT)
- ZIP code: 72572
- Area code: 870
- GNIS feature ID: 58565

Saffell is an unincorporated community in Lawrence County, Arkansas, United States. Saffell is located at the junction of Arkansas highways 25 and 361, 3.5 miles (5.6 km) south-southeast of Strawberry. Saffell has a post office with ZIP code 72572.

== Education ==
It is within the Hillcrest School District.

It was formerly in the Strawberry School District. On July 1, 1992, that district merged into the River Valley School District, which then merged into Hillcrest on July 1, 2004.
