= Walnut Ridge School District =

Defunct school district in Arkansas, United States

Walnut Ridge School District was a school district headquartered in Walnut Ridge, Arkansas. Walnut Ridge Elementary School and Walnut Ridge High School were its schools.

It served most of Walnut Ridge, College City (now a part of Walnut Ridge), Alicia, and a small section of Black Rock.

== History ==
Prior to August 26, 1957, the district sent, via contract, high school-aged African-American children to Booker T. Washington High School in Jonesboro, Arkansas, which was operated by the Jonesboro School District. On that day the Jonesboro district's board of trustees ended the contract.

On July 1, 2006, it merged with the Black Rock School District to form the Lawrence County School District.
