= Arkansas Highway 361 =

State highway in Arkansas, United States

Highway 361

Route information
- Maintained by ArDOT
- Existed: November 23, 1966–present

Section 1
- Length: 8.20 mi (13.20 km)
- South end: AR 25 at Saffell
- North end: AR 25 in Lynn

Section 2
- Length: 5.35 mi (8.61 km)
- South end: AR 117 in Black Rock
- North end: AR 166 at Davidsonville Historic State Park

Location
- Country: United States
- State: Arkansas
- Counties: Lawrence, Randolph

Highway system
- Arkansas Highway System; Interstate; US; State; Business; Spurs; Suffixed; Scenic; Heritage
| ← AR 360 | → AR 362 |

Highway 361 (AR 361, Ark. 361, and Hwy. 361) is a designation for two north–south state highways in the Arkansas Delta region of eastern Arkansas. One segment of 8.20 miles (13.20 km) runs east from Highway 25 at Saffell to Highway 25 in Lynn. A second route of 5.35 miles (8.61 km) begins at Highway 117 in Black Rock and runs north to Highway 166 at Old Davidsonville State Park. Both routes are maintained by the Arkansas State Highway and Transportation Department (AHTD).

== Route description ==
=== Saffell to Lynn ===
Highway 361 begins at Highway 25 at Saffell in southwestern Lawrence County. The route runs east before turning north and crossing the Strawberry River. Following the crossing, Highway 361 curves north and passes through agricultural areas before intersecting Highway 25 in Lynn, where it terminates.

=== Black Rock to Davidsonville Historic State Park ===
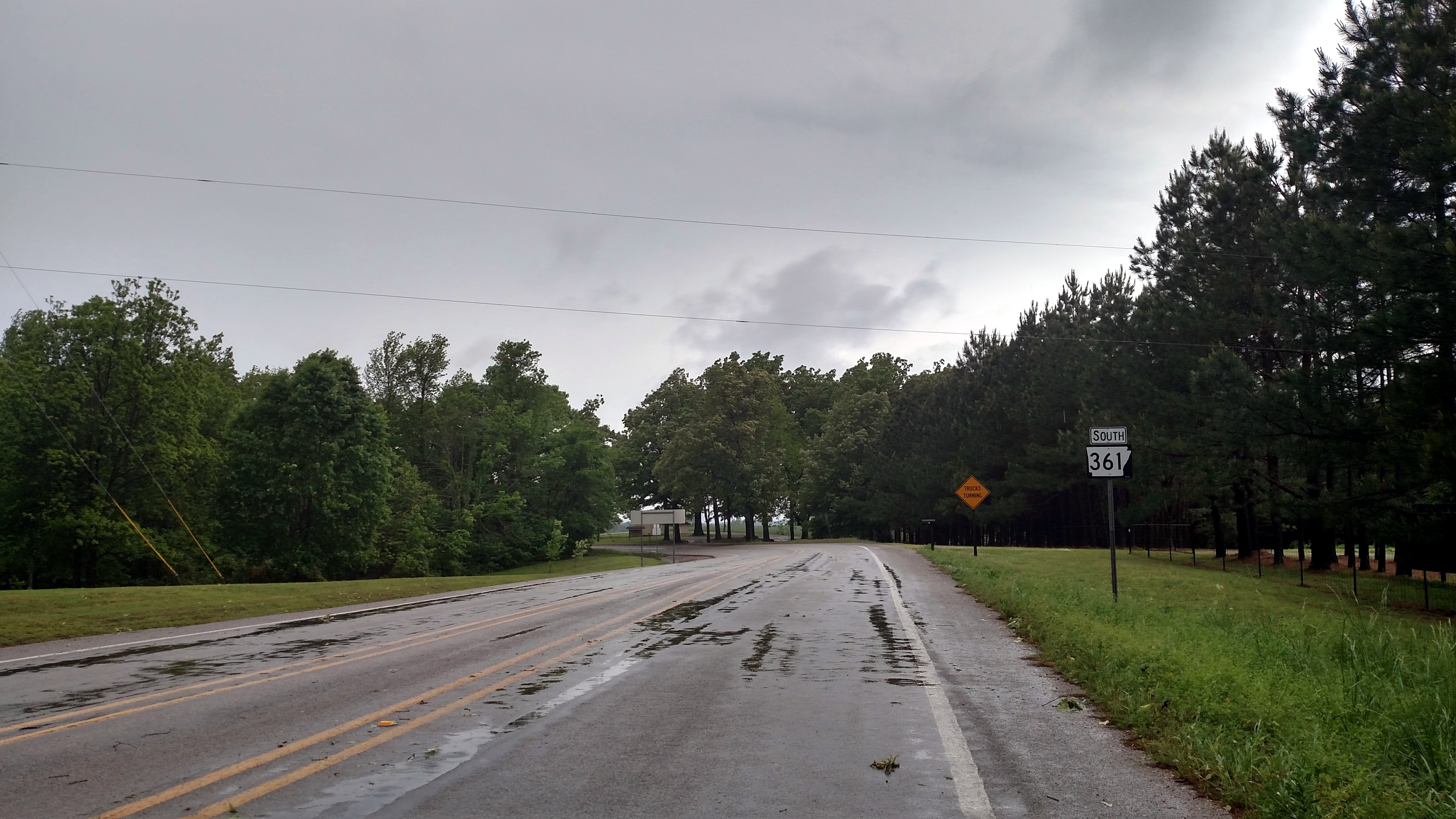
Highway 361 near Davidsonville Historic State Park

Highway 361 begins at Highway 117 (Elm St) in Black Rock. The highway runs north to cross the Spring River on the Lawrence/Randolph county line and enter Randolph County. Continuing north, Highway 361 enters Davidsonville Historic State Park, where the route terminates. The roadway continues north as Highway 166.

== History ==
The highway segment between Saffell and Lynn was added to the state highway system by the Arkansas State Highway Commission on November 23, 1966. A second segment from Black Rock to the Spring River was added to the system on April 24, 1973. The highway was extended north to the state park on May 6, 1987.

== Major intersections ==
| County | Location | mi | km | Destinations | Notes |
|---|---|---|---|---|---|
| Lawrence | Saffell | 0.00 | 0.00 | AR 25 – Strawberry, Black Rock, Cord, Batesville | Southern terminus |
| Lawrence | | 2.45 | 3.94 | Bridge over the Strawberry River | |
| Lawrence | Lynn | 8.20 | 13.20 | AR 25 – Strawberry, Powhatan | Northern terminus |
| Lawrence | Highway 361 begins in Black Rock | | | | |
| Lawrence | Black Rock | 0.00 | 0.00 | AR 117 (Elm St) | Southern terminus |
| Lawrence–Randolph county line | | 2.89 | 4.65 | Bridge over the Spring River | |
| Randolph | Davidsonville Historic State Park | 5.35 | 8.61 | AR 166 – Pocahontas | Northern terminus, roadway continues as Hwy. 166 |
1.000 mi = 1.609 km; 1.000 km = 0.621 mi
