= Huntsville Municipal Airport =

Huntsville Municipal Airport may refer to:

- Huntsville Municipal Airport (Arkansas) in Huntsville, Arkansas, United States
- Huntsville Municipal Airport (Texas) in Huntsville, Texas, United States
