= Poughkeepsie (disambiguation) =

Poughkeepsie is a city in Dutchess County, New York, United States.

Poughkeepsie can also refer to:

- Relating to Poughkeepsie, New York:
  - Poughkeepsie (Metro-North station), a railroad station in the city
  - Poughkeepsie (town), New York, a town surrounding the city
  - The Poughkeepsie Tapes, a 2007 film based in and named after the aforementioned city.
- Poughkeepsie, Arkansas, an unincorporated area in Sharp County, Arkansas
