= River Valley School District =

River Valley School District may refer to:

- River Valley School District (Pennsylvania)
- River Valley School District (Arkansas)
- River Valley Community School District
- River Valley School District (Wisconsin)
