= KHBZ =

KHBZ may refer to:

- Heber Springs Municipal Airport (ICAO code KHBZ)
- KHBZ (FM), a radio station (102.9 FM) licensed to serve Harrison, Arkansas, United States
- KIKI (AM), a radio station (990 AM) licensed to serve Honolulu, Hawaii, United States, which had the KHBZ calls from 1997 to 2010
- KOKQ, a radio station (94.7 FM) licensed to serve Oklahoma City, Oklahoma, United States, which held the call sign KHBZ-FM from 2002 to 2010
