= 27th Flying Training Wing =

World War II American military unit

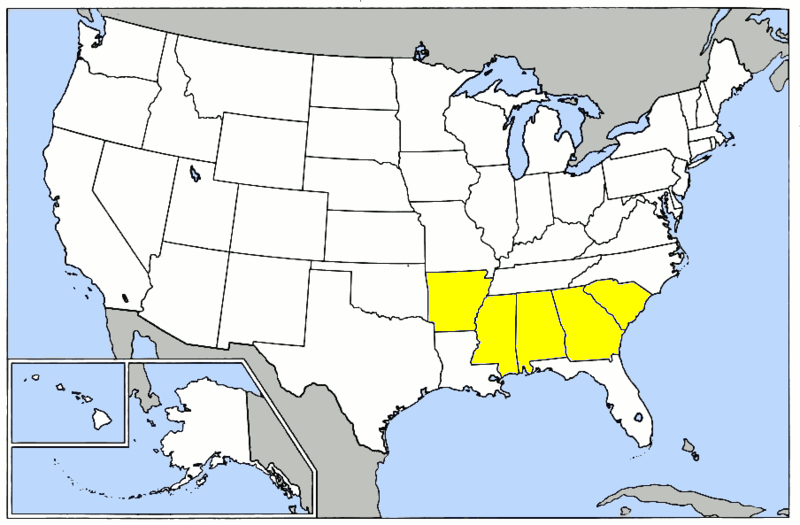
- Locations of airfields controlled by the 27th Flying Training Wing
- Active: 1942–1946
- Country: United States
- Branch: United States Army Air Forces
- Role: Flying training
- Part of: Western Flying Training Command
- Engagements: World War II: World War II American Theater

The 27th Flying Training Wing was a training formation of the United States Army Air Forces. From 1943–45 it was assigned to Eastern Flying Training Command. In 1945–46 it was assigned to the Western Flying Training Command, and it was disbanded on 15 December 1945 at Randolph Field, Texas.

The wing directed flying training at Flight Schools in the Southeastern United States. While its direct superior, regional flying training command did change twice, ultimately it was part of Army Air Forces Training Command. The assigned schools provided phase II basic flying training for Air Cadets Graduates of the advanced schools were commissioned as Second Lieutenants, received their "wings" and were reassigned to Operational or Replacement Training Units operated by one of the four numbered air forces in the Zone of the Interior.

As training requirements changed during the war, and schools were activated and inactivated or transferred to meet those requirements.

The schools primarily flew the Vultee BT-13 / BT-15 Valiant for basic flying instruction. In 1945, the North American AT-6 Texan was also used. Some of the schools later converted to four-engine B-24 transition and single-engine fighter transition schools

The wing was disbanded in June 1946. There is no lineage link, according to official U.S. Air Force lineage rules, between the 27th Fighter Wing (now the 27th Special Operations Wing), established on 28 July 1947 at Kearney Army Airfield, Nebraska, and the 27th FTW.

== Lineage ==
- Established as 27th Flying Training Wing on 17 December 1942

Activated on 26 December 1942
Disbanded on 16 Jun 1946

== Assignments ==
- Army Air Forces Southeast Training Center, 17 December 1942
- Army Air Forces Eastern Flying Training Command, 15 September 1943
- Army Air Forces Western Flying Training Command, 15 December 1945

== Components ==
Bainbridge Army Airfield, Bainbridge, Georgia
AAF Pilot School (Basic)
15th Basic Flying Training Group
Opened: May 1941, Closed: November 1944 (BT-13, BT-15)
Later Bainbridge Air Base 1951–1961

Bush Field, Augusta, Georgia
AAF Contract Pilot School (Basic)
72d Army Air Force Flight Training Detachment (Basic)
Opened: June 1941, Closed: August 1944 (BT-13, BT-15)
Operated by: Georgia Aero Tech

Cochran Army Airfield, Macon, Georgia
AAF Pilot School (Basic)
9th Basic Flying Training Group
Opened: May 1941, Closed: April 1945 (BT-13, BT-15)
Also trained RAF pilots; Began using AT-6s for basic flying, June 1944 closed July 1945

Courtland Army Airfield, Courtland, Alabama
AAF Pilot School (Basic)
13th Basic Flying Training Group
Opened: February 1943, Closed: August 1944 (BT-13, BT-15)
Became B-24 Liberator four-engine transition school, September 1944,

Greenville Army Airfield, Greenville, Mississippi
AAF Pilot School (Basic)
6th Basic Flying Training Group
Opened: December 1941, Closed: April 1945 (BT-13, BT-15)
Later Greenville Air Force Base 1950-1960

Greenwood Army Airfield, Greenwood, Mississippi
AAF Pilot School (Basic)
7th Basic Flying Training Group
Opened: January 1943, Closed: October 1944 (BT-13, BT-15)
Became advanced single-engine transition school (P-47, P-51, P-63), January 1945; Closed October 1945

Newport Army Airfield, Newport, Arkansas
AAF Pilot School (Basic)
14th Basic Flying Training Group
Opened: December 1942, Closed: June 1944 (BT-13, BT-15)
Later became Marine Corps Air Facility Newport

Shaw Field, Sumter, South Carolina
AAF Pilot School (Basic)
Opened: December 1941, Closed: December 1944 (BT-13, BT-15)
Began flying AT-10 two-engine trainers, February 1944; became advanced single-engine transition school (P-47, P-51, P-63), May 1945; Remained open after the war, now USAF Shaw Air Force Base

Walnut Ridge Army Airfield, Walnut Ridge, Arkansas
AAF Pilot School (Basic)
11th Basic Flying Training Group
Opened: September 1942, Closed: September 1944 (BT-13, BT-15)
Became RFC Walnut Ridge after war ended, disposal site for surplus aircraft

== Stations ==
- Cochran Army Airfield, Georgia, 17 December 1942 – 15 December 1945
- Randolph Field, Texas, 16 December 1945 – 16 June 1946
