= Brock Vandagriff =

American former football player (born 2002)

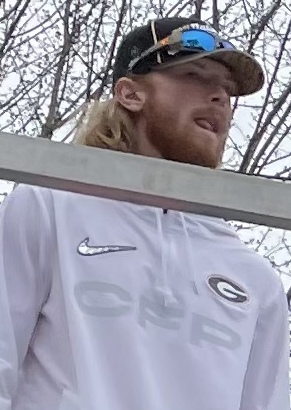
- Vandagriff in 2022

No. 12
- Position: Quarterback

Personal information
- Born: May 30, 2002 (age 24); Bogart, Georgia, U.S.
- Listed height: 6 ft 3 in (1.91 m)
- Listed weight: 205 lb (93 kg)

Career information
- High school: Prince Avenue Christian School (Bogart)
- College: Georgia (2021–2023); Kentucky (2024)

Awards and highlights
- 2× CFP national champion (2021, 2022)
- Stats at ESPN

Brock Benefield Vandagriff (born May 30, 2002) is an American former college football quarterback. He was a member of the 2021 and 2022 Georgia Bulldogs that won back-to-back national championships. He also played for the Kentucky Wildcats.

== Early life ==
Vandagriff played high school football at Prince Avenue Christian School in Bogart, Georgia. Vandagriff was a five-star recruit coming out of high school. He originally committed to play college football at Oklahoma, but later decommitted after concerns about playing far away from home. He later committed to Georgia.

== College career ==
=== Georgia ===
In Georgia's G-Day spring game Vandagriff went six of nine for 47 yards. He spent most of 2021 as a backup to Stetson Bennett and incumbent starter JT Daniels. He made his college football debut against UAB. He also played in reserve in Georgia's win over FCS opponent Charleston Southern. The team went on to win the Orange Bowl and a national championship.

In 2022, Vandagriff appeared in three games against Samford, South Carolina, and Vanderbilt. He only attempted two passes as both went for incompletions; he also had one rush attempt for seven yards. The team went on to win the Peach Bowl and back-to-back national championships.

In 2023, Vandagriff competed with redshirt junior Carson Beck and redshirt freshman Gunner Stockton for the starting quarterback job at Georgia, with Beck being named the starter. He entered the transfer portal on December 4, 2023.

=== Kentucky ===
On December 6, 2023, Vandagriff announced that he would be transferring to the University of Kentucky to play for the Kentucky Wildcats. In 11 games for Kentucky, he threw for 1,593 yards, 10 touchdowns, and 8 interceptions. On December 29, 2024, Vandagriff announced his retirement from football.

=== Statistics ===
Season	Team	Games			Passing								Rushing			
Season	Team	GP	GS	Record	Comp	Att	Pct	Yards	Avg	TD	Int	Rate	Att	Yards	Avg	TD
2021	Georgia	2	0	0–0	0	1	0.0	0	0.0	0	0	0.0	0	0	0.0	0
2022	Georgia	3	0	0–0	0	2	0.0	0	0.0	0	0	0.0	1	7	7.0	0
2023	Georgia	8	0	0–0	12	18	66.7	165	9.2	2	0	180.3	5	39	7.8	0
2024	Kentucky	11	11	4–7	125	218	57.3	1,593	7.3	10	8	126.5	90	131	1.5	0
Career		24	11	4–7	137	239	57.3	1,758	7.4	12	8	129.0	96	177	1.8	0
