= Warren Municipal Airport =

Warren Municipal Airport may refer to:

- Warren Municipal Airport (Arkansas) in Warren, Arkansas, United States (FAA: 3M9)
- Warren Municipal Airport (Minnesota) in Warren, Minnesota, United States (FAA: D37)
