= Black Rock High School =

Location
- 189 North St Joseph Street; Black Rock, Arkansas 72415; United States
- Coordinates: 36°6′35″N 91°6′12″W

Information
- School type: Public comprehensive
- Status: Closed but merged with LCSD
- School district: Lawrence County School District (2006-2014); Black Rock School District (-2006)
- CEEB code: 040215
- NCES School ID: 050008201208
- Teaching staff: 13.81 (on FTE basis)
- Grades: 7–12
- Enrollment: 136 (2010–11)
- Student to teacher ratio: 9.85
- Education system: ADE Smart Core
- Classes offered: Regular, Advanced Placement (AP)
- Colors: Red and white
- Athletics conference: 1A Region 3 East
- Mascot: Zebra
- Team name: Black Rock Zebras
- Accreditation: ADE
- Affiliation: Arkansas Activities Association

Black Rock High School was an accredited comprehensive public high school located in Black Rock, Arkansas, United States. The school provided secondary education in grades 7 through 12 to Black Rock and nearby unincorporated communities of Lawrence County, Arkansas. The school, which closed in 2014, was one of five public high schools in Lawrence County and one of two high schools administered by the Lawrence County School District; the other, Walnut Ridge High School, is still in operation.

== History ==
In 2013 the district closed the Black Rock schools; students now attend Walnut Ridge High.

== Academics ==
The assumed course of study follows the Smart Core curriculum developed by the Arkansas Department of Education (ADE), which requires students complete at least 22 units prior to graduation. Students complete regular coursework and exams and may take Advanced Placement (AP) courses and exam with the opportunity to receive college credit. Black Rock High School is accredited by the ADE.

== Athletics ==
The Black Rock High School mascot and athletic emblem is the Zebra with red and white serving as the school colors.

The Black Rock Zebras compete in interscholastic activities within the 1A Classification, the state's smallest classification administered by the Arkansas Activities Association. The Zebras play within the 1A Region 3 East Conference.

The Zebras participate in basketball (boys/girls), baseball, and softball.
