= Herman Hugg =

American artist, educator, and philosopher (1921–2013)

- Born: January 19, 1921; Strawberry, Arkansas
- Died: October 2, 2013 (aged 92); Houston, Texas
- Education: West Texas State University, Canyon, Texas, and Stephen F. Austin State University, Nacogdoches, Texas
- Known for: Painting, Sculpture
- Movement: Surrealism
- Spouse: Minnie Beth Hugg

Herman Elzo Hugg (January 19, 1921 – October 2, 2013) was an American artist, educator, and philosopher.

Hugg was primarily a painter, whose works often included surrealist, expressionist, and spiritual elements. He also created sculptures in stone and wood, and large-scale works of enamel on recycled metal.

He was a longtime-resident of Beaumont, Texas, where he was a teacher at South Park High School and a member of the Beaumont Art League.

== Biography ==
=== Early life and education ===
Hugg was born in Strawberry, Arkansas, to Edgar and Telia Massey Hugg. The family moved to the Texas Panhandle when Herman was six years old. He earned an undergraduate degree from West Texas State University and a master's from Stephen F. Austin State University.

=== World War II ===
Hugg served in the United States Navy Seabees 47th Battalion corps of engineers during World War II in the Solomon Islands.

== Exhibitions ==
The Beaumont Art League hosted a retrospective of Hugg's work in 2009. Six of his pieces were included in the Art Museum of Southeast Texas's show Southeast Texas Art: Cross-Currents and Influences 1925-1965 from January 22 to April 3, 2011.

== Selected works ==
- Foxhole (1947),
- Dear John (1945),
- Forsaken Garden (1947)
