= Lawrence County School District (Arkansas) =

School district in Arkansas

Location
- 508 East Free Street; Walnut Ridge, Arkansas 72476
- Coordinates: 36°3′44″N 90°57′26″W

District information
- Type: Public (government funded)
- Grades: PK–12
- Schools: 4
- NCES District ID: 0500082

Students and staff
- Students: 1,148
- Teachers: 100.74 (on FTE basis)
- Staff: 189.74 (on FTE basis)
- Student–teacher ratio: 11.40

Other information
- Website: www.bobcats.k12.ar.us

Lawrence County School District is a public school district headquartered in Walnut Ridge, Arkansas and serving the communities of Lawrence County. Lawrence County School District employs over more than 175 faculty and staff to provide educational programs for students ranging from prekindergarten through twelfth grade and enrolls more than 1,100 students.

It serves most of Walnut Ridge, including the former College City, Black Rock, and Alicia.

All schools in the district are accredited by AdvancED (formerly the North Central Association of Colleges and Schools).

== History ==
The district was formed in 2006 by the merger of the Black Rock School District and the Walnut Ridge School District; the two districts voluntarily agreed to merge. The merger took effect on July 1, 2006.

== Schools ==
Currently operating:

- Walnut Ridge High School : Grades 7–12
- Walnut Ridge Elementary School : Grades PK–6

Former:

- Black Rock High School : Grades 7–12
- Black Rock Elementary School : Grades PK–6

Circa 2007 the Black Rock schools together had 340 students. By 2013 this number fell to 254. In 2013 the district closed the Black Rock schools to avoid financial difficulties.
