= Marine Corps Air Facility Walnut Ridge =

Marine Corps Air Facility Walnut Ridge Walnut Ridge Army Air Field
- Part of Army Air Forces Training Command
- Located near: Walnut Ridge, Arkansas
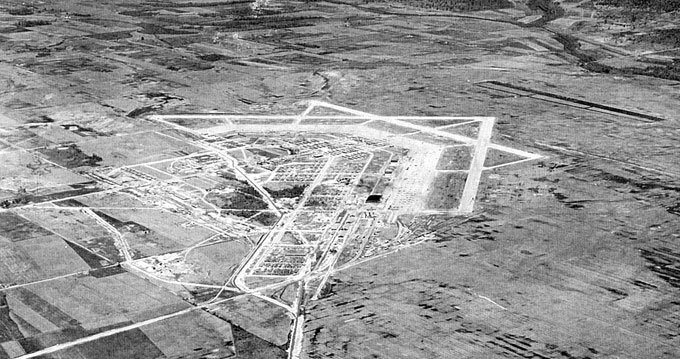
- Oblique airphoto of Walnut Ridge Army Air Field, looking northeast, taken while under construction in 1942

Location
- Coordinates: 36°07′29″N 090°55′30″W

Site history
- Built: 1942
- Built by: United States Marine Corps; United States Army Air Forces
- In use: 1942-1945
- Battles/wars: World War II

Garrison information
- Garrison: 11th Flying Training Group (1942-1944)

See also: Walnut Ridge Air Force Station

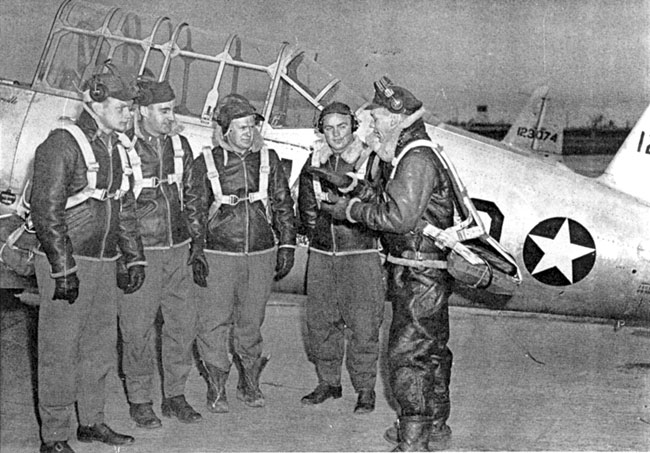
Flying cadets at Walnut Ridge AAF in front of a Vultee BT-13A Valiant, 1943 (Serial 41-23074 visible)

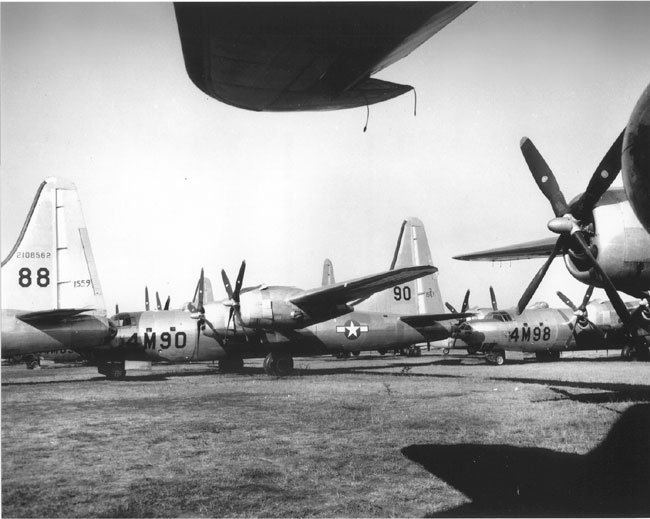
Consolidated B-32 Dominators awaiting the smelter at RFC Walnut Ridge, 1946 (Serial 42-108562 visible)

Marine Corps Air Facility Walnut Ridge is a former United States Army and United States Marine Corps airfield in Walnut Ridge, Arkansas. After it was closed, it was turned into Walnut Ridge Regional Airport.

== History ==
=== Walnut Ridge Army Air Field ===
In 1942, the United States Army Air Corps picked Walnut Ridge as the location of one of the new basic flying schools being built to train tens of thousands of military pilots. It was built in the late spring and summer, and opened on 15 August 1942 as Walnut Ridge Army Air Field (AAF).

It consisted of a main 6,000 ft runway aligned 04/22 and two 5,000 ft secondary runways aligned 01/19 and 13/31; all were concrete.

Several auxiliary airfields were constructed to support training:

- Pocahontas Field AF Auxiliary #1 (Naval OLF) 36°14′41″N 090°57′15″W
- Biggers Field AF Auxiliary #2 (Naval OLF) 36°19′30″N 090°46′00″W
- Walcott Field AF Auxiliary #3 (Naval OLF) 36°02′12″N 090°42′12″W
- Bono Field AF Auxiliary #4 (Naval OLF) 35°57′02″N 090°47′24″W
- Beech Grove AF Auxiliary #5 (Naval OLF) 36°11′47″N 090°37′30″W

Walnut Ridge AAF was placed under the jurisdiction of the Southeast Training Command, Army Air Forces Training Command. Training at the Army Air Forces Flying School (Basic) began in October 1943. It put new pilots through the third stage of their flight training, largely with Vultee BT-13 Valiant single-engine monoplane trainers. Graduates from the basic flight school were transferred to one of Training Command's advanced flying schools, like nearby Blytheville Army Airfield. Upon competition of the training program, the cadets were awarded their pilot's wings and commissioned as second lieutenants.

The training unit at the base became the 11th Basic Flying Training Group, 27th Flying Training Wing (U.S. Army Air Forces).

Trainees flew a total of 160,646 hours from 1 November 1942 to 30 September 1943, well above the average of 129,474 for a Basic Flying School in the Southeast Training Command. Walnut Ridge had .49 accidents per 1,000 hours, lower than the .57 accidents-per-1000-hours average for all schools. But the fatal accident rate at Walnut Ridge was higher: .087 per 1000 hours versus a .052 average. The hours flown at Walnut Ridge through 30 June 1944, totaled 414,429.

Walnut Ridge graduated more than 4,600 pilots. Forty-two students and instructors died in training.

Walnut Ridge also hosted a major Air Technical Service Command (ATSC) maintenance facility. It performed phase maintenance and other updates on training aircraft from bases around the United States, including C-47 Skytrains, P-40 Warhawks, P-51 Mustangs, B-17 Flying Fortresses and later in the war, B-29 Superfortresses.

Walnut Ridge's Basic school graduated its last class on 27 June 1944, and closed at the end of the month. The facility was transferred to the Department of the Navy.

=== Marine Corps Air Facility ===
Under Navy control, the facility was used by the United States Marine Corps as a pilot training school. VMF-513 was transferred to the base on 14 September 1944 and operated SBD-5s and FG-1D Corsairs. Apparently the school only operated until 4 December 1944, when the school was moved to MCAS Mojave, California. The Navy decommissioned the base on 15 March 1945.

== RFC Walnut Ridge ==
With the end of World War II, the Reconstruction Finance Corporation (RFC) established a disposal and reclamation facility at Walnut Ridge for aircraft unneeded by the United States military. RFC Walnut Ridge became one of the largest disposal sites for aircraft in the United States. It is estimated that about 10,000 warbirds were flown to Walnut Ridge in 1945 and 1946 for storage and sale. Some sources report the number to be over 11,000.

Fighters, bombers, trainers, and all other manner of aircraft were offered for sale to the public, some of the planes being newly manufactured and flown to Walnut Ridge directly from the assembly line. Some were sold to various civilian entities and to the general public (stripped of their armament and classified military components). However, most aircraft sent to Walnut Ridge were dismantled and their airframes shredded, their hulks finding their way to two large aluminum smelters built on the flight line ramp. The smelters turned the aluminum of the aircraft into ingots, which were recycled and sold to industry for use in manufacturing a wide variety of items, from toasters to mobile homes.

RFC Walnut Ridge disposed of aircraft until 1951, when it was closed. The smelters themselves were dismantled the next year and used as bricks for a civil administration/terminal building on the civil airport established by the City of Walnut Ridge.

== Major Units Assigned ==
- 11th Basic Flying Training Group
  - 683rd Flying Training Squadron
  - 684th Flying Training Squadron
  - 685th Flying Training Squadron
  - 686th Flying Training Squadron
  - 687th Flying Training Squadron
  - 688th Flying Training Squadron
  - 689th Flying Training Squadron
  - 690th Flying Training Squadron
- 2145th Army Air Forces Base Unit

== Major Aircraft Assigned ==
Vultee BT-13A Valiant

Vultee BT-15 Valiant

== See also ==
Army Air Forces Training Command Walnut Ridge Air Force Station
