= David J. Sanders =

American politician (born 1975)

David James Sanders

Member of the Arkansas Senate from the 15th district
- In office January 2013 – January 2019
- Preceded by: David Burnett
- Succeeded by: Mark Johnson

Member of the Arkansas House of Representatives from the 31st district
- In office 2011–2013
- Preceded by: Dan Greenberg
- Succeeded by: Andy Davis

Personal details
- Born: January 21, 1975 (age 51) West Memphis, Crittenden County, Arkansas, US
- Party: Republican
- Spouse: Rebecca Pennington Sanders
- Children: 5
- Education: Walnut Ridge High School; Ouachita Baptist University
- Occupation: Educational administrator

David James Sanders (born January 21, 1975) is a former member of the Arkansas State Senate for District 15, which encompasses Conway County and parts of Faulkner, Perry, Pulaski, and Van Buren counties. From 2011 to 2013, he served a term in the Arkansas House of Representatives for Pulaski County.

== Background ==
A native of West Memphis in Crittenden County in easternmost Arkansas, Sanders graduated in 1993 from Walnut Ridge High School in Walnut Ridge in Lawrence County in the northeastern portion of his state. In 1997, he received a bachelor's degree in Political Science and Mass Communications from Ouachita Baptist University in Arkadelphia in Clark County, Arkansas. He and his wife, Rebecca, a high school choral director, have five children.

In 2002, Arkansas Business named Sanders one its "40 Under 40" list. Sanders, who at the time was pursuing a career in both business and media claimed that he once wanted to run for office, but enjoyed business and "writing about politicians".

== Political life ==
=== Arkansas House of Representatives ===
As a member of the Arkansas House of Representatives, Sanders, wrote the Athlete Agent Reform Act of 2011, which has been recognized by the NCAA as the nation's strongest legislation targeting illegal activities of sports agents. He also sponsored the state's first ethics law targeting Arkansas’ banking, insurance, securities and utility, regulators.

=== Senate duties ===
In the 2013, Sanders passed legislation cracking down waste, fraud and abuse in the state's Medicaid program—including in the creation of the state's Office of Medicaid Inspector General (Acts 1436, 1499 and 1504). In addition, Sanders has to his credit sweeping laws that corrected years of structural problems with Arkansas’ parole system (Acts 435, 1029 and 1030). He passed the first reduction in the state's income tax rates (Act 1459) and reformed the state's worker's compensation laws for motor carriers (Act 1166).

Sanders is one of the architects of Arkansas’ Private Option, the conservative alternative to President Barack Obama’s Medicaid expansion contained in the Patient Protection and Affordable Care Act. Poorer Arkansans under the plan can purchase private insurance with the help of premium assistance, instead of being relegated to the Medicaid rolls. Republican governors in Iowa, Utah, and Indiana have proposed plans similar to Arkansas’ innovative model.

Sanders worked during his term with members of a bipartisan task force to reform the Arkansas’ State Employees and School Employees Health Insurance Plan.

=== Committee work ===
Committee chairmanships:

- Arkansas Legislative (ALC) Rules and Regulations Sub-Committee
- Arkansas Health Insurance Marketplace Legislative Oversight Committee
- Legislative Joint Auditing Medicaid Subcommittee.

Committee Membership:

- Joint Budget
- Legislative Joint Audit
- Senate Public Health, Labor and Welfare
- Senate Insurance and Commerce
- Senate Efficiency
- Joint Performance Review Committee
- Arkansas Legislative Council (ALC)
- ALC-Charitable, Penal and Correctional Institutions
- ALC Peer Review Committee

== Awards and Recognitions in the 89th General Assembly ==
- "Legislator of the Year," Arkansas Association of Chiefs of Police
- “Business Matters Legislative Leadership Award," Arkansas State Chamber of Commerce/Arkansas Associated Industries
- "Advocate for Justice," Arkansas Prosecuting Attorneys Association
- "Legislative Leader for Children," Arkansas Kids Count Coalition
- "ACU Conservative," American Conservative Union

== Other honors ==
- Top 10 Lawmakers, Talk Business Arkansas
- Visionary Arkansan, Arkansas Times' List of 25 of the Arkansas’ Creative Thinkers

Preceded by David Burnett (switched to District 22)	Arkansas State Senator for District 15 (Conway, Faulkner, Perry, Pulaski, and Van Buren counties); 2013–	Succeeded by Incumbent
Preceded by Daniel Greenberg	Arkansas State Representative for District 31 (Pulaski County); 2011–2013	Succeeded by Andy Davis
