= Hillcrest School District =

School district in Arkansas

Location
- 146 South Main Street; Strawberry, Arkansas 72469 United States

District information
- Type: Comprehensive public
- Grades: PK–12
- Accreditation: ADE
- Schools: 2
- NCES District ID: 0500071

Students and staff
- Students: 459
- Teachers: 37.75 (on FTE basis)
- Staff: 83.75 (on FTE basis)
- Student–teacher ratio: 12.16
- Athletic conference: 1A Region 2 (2012–14)
- District mascot: Screamin' Eagles
- Colors: Red; White; Blue

Other information
- Website: hillcrest.k12.ar.us

Hillcrest School District is a school district based in Strawberry, Arkansas, United States. The district encompasses 266.08 square miles (689.1 km^{2}) of land in Lawrence, Independence, and Sharp counties, and serves portions of Strawberry, Lynn, Smithville, Poughkeepsie, and Saffell.

== History ==
On July 1, 2004, the district formed as a result of the merger of the River Valley School District with the Lynn School District. On July 1, 2010, the Twin Rivers School District was dissolved. A portion of the district was given to the Hillcrest district.

== Schools ==
Hillcrest School District supports more than 450 students with more than 80 faculty and staff for its two schools:

- Hillcrest Elementary School, located in Lynn and serving prekindergarten through grade 6.
- Hillcrest High School, located in Strawberry and serving grades 7 through 12.
