= Salem Airport (Arkansas) =

- IATA: none; ICAO: none; FAA LID: 7M9

Summary
- Airport type: Public
- Owner: City of Salem
- Serves: Salem, Arkansas
- Elevation AMSL: 787 ft (240 m)
- Coordinates: 36°21′21″N 091°49′51″W

Map
- Location of airport in Arkansas 7M9 (the United States)

Runways
Direction	Length		Surface
Direction	ft	m	Surface
2/20	3,489	1,063	Asphalt

Statistics (2010)
- Aircraft operations: 4,150
- Based aircraft: 10
- Source: Federal Aviation Administration

Salem Airport (FAA LID: 7M9) is a city-owned, public-use airport located one nautical mile (2 km) south of the central business district of Salem, a city in Fulton County, Arkansas, United States.

== Facilities and aircraft ==
Salem Airport covers an area of 127 acres (51 ha) at an elevation of 787 feet (240 m) above mean sea level. It has one runway designated 2/20 with an asphalt surface measuring 3,489 by 50 feet (1,063 x 15 m).

For the 12-month period ending May 31, 2010, the airport had 4,150 aircraft operations, an average of 11 per day: 96% general aviation and 4% military. At that time there were 10 single-engine aircraft based at this airport.

== See also ==
- List of airports in Arkansas
