= Prince Avenue Christian School =

Private, covenant Christian school in Bogart, Georgia, United States

Location
- 2201 Ruth Jackson Rd; Bogart, Georgia; United States; 33.911711°N 83.552951°W

Information
- Type: Private Christian
- Established: 1978
- Founder: Pastor Bill Ricketts
- Chairman: Mr. Joe Taylor
- Administrator: Dr. Seth Hathaway, Ed.D.
- Grades: PreK3-12
- Enrollment: 920
- Campus: Oconee County, Georgia
- Colors: Blue and Gold
- Mascot: The Wolverines
- Rival: Athens Academy
- Accreditation: SAIS/Cognia/ACSI
- Yearbook: Koinonia
- Affiliations: Southern Association of Independent Schools, Association of Christian Schools International
- Website: princeave.org

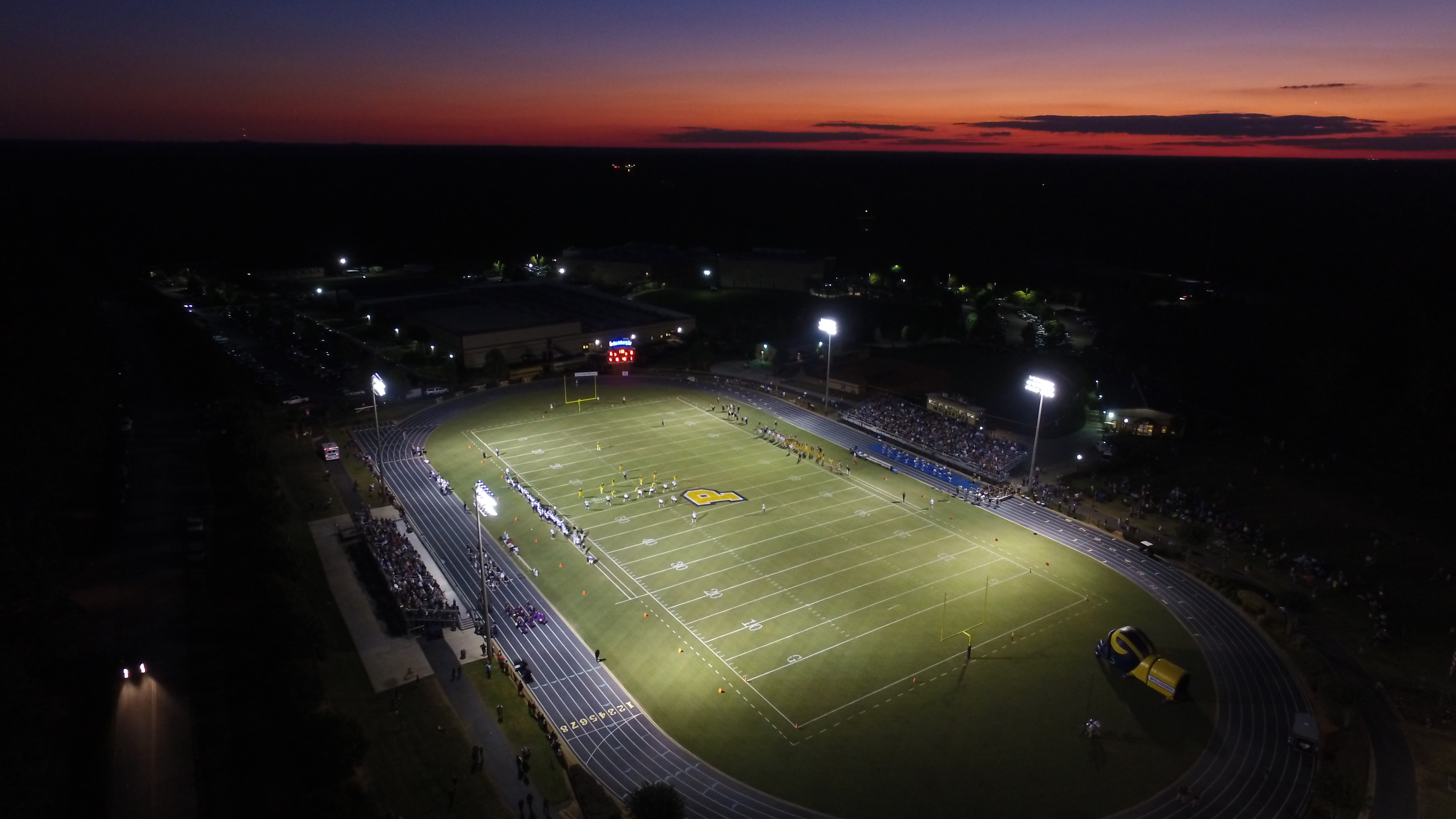
Friday night under the lights at the school's 65 acre campus.

Prince Avenue Christian School (PACS) is a private, covenant Christian school located on 2201 Ruth Jackson Road in Bogart, Georgia, United States, with an annual enrollment between 800 and 850 students.

== History ==
The school opened in 1978 in downtown Athens and was initially housed in Prince Avenue Baptist Church. Now located on a 60-acre campus in Oconee County, the school serves students from thirteen surrounding counties representing sixty-eight different churches.

== Campus ==
The school is located on 65 acres in Oconee County in Northeast Georgia. Buildings include over 50,000 sq ft of instructional space including a weight training facility, band room, and practice and competition fields for athletics.

== Academics ==
PACS is a college preparatory school offering a variety of college placement, honors, Advanced Placement (AP), and Dual enrollment classes. The school's robust DE program provides over 40 college credit hours students can take on campus from adjunct college instructors. PACS is accredited by the Southern Association of Independent Schools (SAIS)/Southern Association of Colleges and Schools (SACS), and the Association of Christian Schools International (ACSI), and an affiliate member of the Georgia Independent School Association (GISA).

== Athletics ==
The school is a member of the Georgia High School Association (GHSA) and has elementary and middle school athletic programs that feed into 17 varsity sports. The school has won multiple state and region championships.

== Biblical Discipleship ==
As a Christian, covenant school, admission standards require at least one parent of each student to be a professing believer in Jesus Christ. School days begin with corporate prayer, students receive daily biblical instruction, and all students and faculty attend chapel together weekly.

== Notable alumni ==
- Jon Richt (2008), football coach
- Brock Vandagriff (2021), former college football quarterback
- Aaron Philo (2024), quarterback for the Georgia Tech Yellow Jackets
