= Billy Free Municipal Airport =

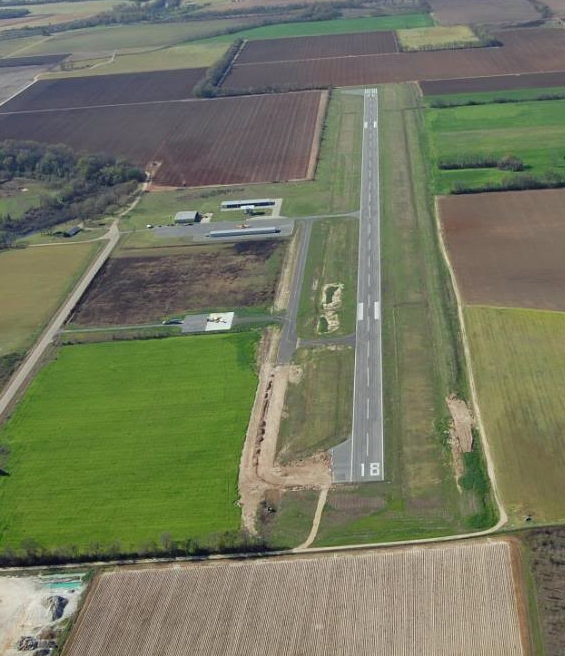
- IATA: none; ICAO: none; FAA LID: 0M0

Summary
- Airport type: Public
- Owner: City of Dumas
- Serves: Dumas, Arkansas
- Elevation AMSL: 164 ft (50 m)
- Coordinates: 33°53′04″N 091°32′03″W
- Website: www.DumasAR.net/...

Map
- Location of airport in Arkansas 0M0 (the United States)

Runways
Direction	Length		Surface
Direction	ft	m	Surface
18/36	5,003	1,525	Asphalt

Statistics (2010)
- Aircraft operations: 11,050
- Based aircraft: 18
- Source: Federal Aviation Administration

Billy Free Municipal Airport (FAA LID: 0M0) is a public use airport in Desha County, Arkansas, United States. The airport is owned by the City of Dumas and located two nautical miles (4 km) west of its central business district. It is included in the National Plan of Integrated Airport Systems for 2011–2015, which categorized it as a general aviation facility.

== Facilities and aircraft ==
Billy Free Municipal Airport covers an area of 73 acres (30 ha) at an elevation of 164 feet (50 m) above mean sea level. It has one runway designated 18/36 with an asphalt surface measuring 5,003 by 75 feet (1,525 x 23 m).

For the 12-month period ending November 30, 2010, the airport had 11,050 aircraft operations, an average of 30 per day: 99.5% general aviation and 0.5% military. At that time there were 18 aircraft based at this airport: 89% single-engine, 6% multi-engine, and 6% helicopter.

== See also ==
- List of airports in Arkansas
