= Warren County Airport =

Warren County Airport may refer to:

- Bowling Green-Warren County Regional Airport in Warren County, Kentucky, United States (FAA: BWG)
- Floyd Bennett Memorial Airport in Warren County, New York, United States (FAA: GFL)
- Front Royal-Warren County Airport in Warren County, Virginia, United States (FAA: FRR)
- Lebanon-Warren County Airport in Warren County, Ohio, United States (FAA: I68)
- Warren County Memorial Airport in Warren County, Tennessee, United States (FAA: RNC)
