= Magnolia Municipal Airport =

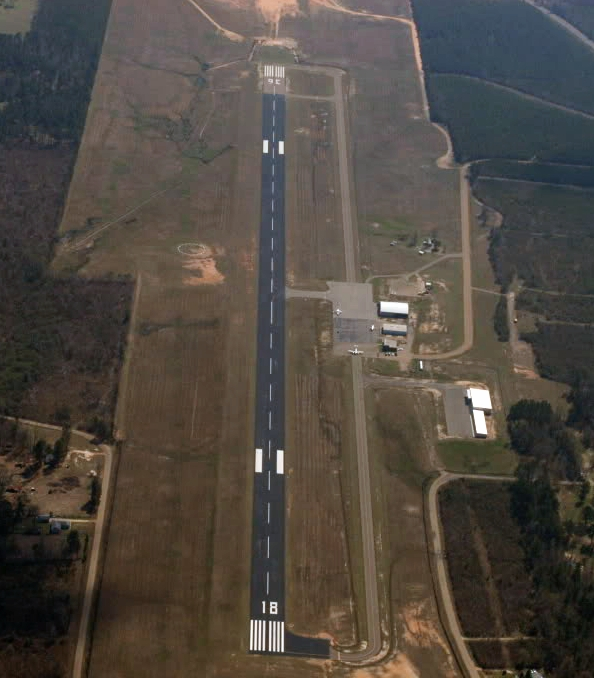
- IATA: AGO; ICAO: KAGO; FAA LID: AGO

Summary
- Airport type: Public
- Owner: City of Magnolia
- Serves: Magnolia, Arkansas
- Elevation AMSL: 319 ft / 97 m
- Coordinates: 33°13′39″N 093°13′01″W
- Interactive map of Magnolia Municipal Airport

Runways
Direction	Length		Surface
Direction	ft	m	Surface
18/36	5,008	1,526	Asphalt

Statistics (2008)
- Aircraft operations: 10,400
- Based aircraft: 13
- Source: Federal Aviation Administration

Magnolia Municipal Airport (IATA: AGO, ICAO: KAGO, FAA LID: AGO) is three miles southeast of Magnolia, in Columbia County, Arkansas.

== History ==
The overlaying of the runway was completed under the Airport Development Acceleration Act in 1973. Trans-Texas Airways Douglas DC-3s stopped at Magnolia, one of many stops on a route between Dallas and Memphis from 1953-54 to 1962.

== Facilities ==
The airport covers 272 acres (110 ha) at an elevation of 319 feet (97 m). Its one runway, 18/36, is 5,008 by 100 feet (1,526 x 30 m).

In the year ending June 30, 2008 the airport had 10,400 aircraft operations, average 28 per day: 96% general aviation, 2% air taxi, and 2% military. 13 aircraft were then based at the airport: 77% single-engine, 15% multi-engine and 8% helicopter.

== See also ==
- List of airports in Arkansas
