= Walnut Ridge Regional Airport =

Walnut Ridge Regional Airport Walnut Ridge Army Airfield Marine Corps Air Facility Walnut Ridge
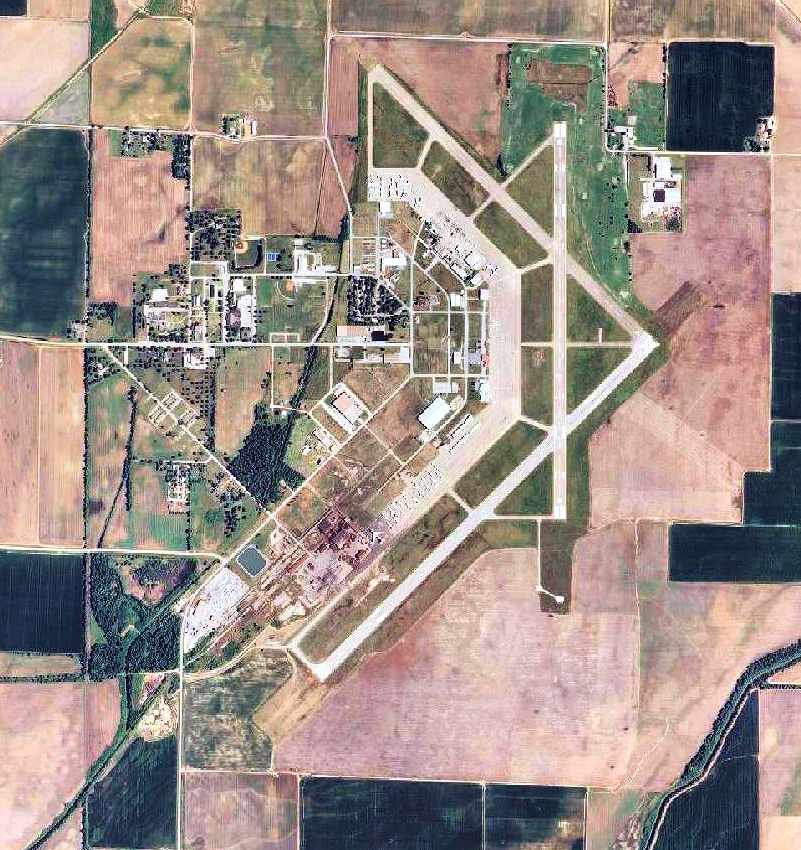
- 2006 USGS aerial image
- IATA: ARG; ICAO: KARG; FAA LID: ARG

Summary
- Airport type: Public
- Owner: City of Walnut Ridge
- Serves: Walnut Ridge, Arkansas
- Location: Campbell Township, Lawrence County
- Built: June 20, 1942
- Elevation AMSL: 279 ft (85 m)
- Coordinates: 36°07′29″N 090°55′30″W
- Website: https://walnutridgeairport.com/

Map
- Location of Walnut Ridge Regional Airport KARG (the United States)

Runways
Direction	Length		Surface
Direction	ft	m	Surface
04/22	6,001	1,829	Asphalt
13/31	5,003	1,525	Concrete
18/36	5,001	1,524	Concrete

Statistics (2023)
- Aircraft operations (year ending 3/31/2023): 40,000
- Based aircraft: 45
- Source: Federal Aviation Administration

Walnut Ridge Regional Airport (IATA: ARG, ICAO: KARG, FAA LID: ARG) is a city-owned public-use airport located four nautical miles (7 km) northeast of the central business district of Walnut Ridge, a city in Lawrence County, Arkansas, United States. According to the FAA's National Plan of Integrated Airport Systems for 2009–2013, its FAA airport category is general aviation.

== History ==
On August 15, 1942, the US Army opened Walnut Ridge Army Airfield, a pilot training school on 3,000 acres north of the town. During World War II, Air Cadets flew the Vultee BT-13 Valiant to learn the basics of flying in combat situations. 4,641 pilots graduated from the "basic" school while the flight school was open. On September 1, 1944, the airfield was transferred to the Department of the Navy and operated as the Marine Corps Air Facility, Walnut Ridge. The facility was decommissioned on March 15, 1945.

In 1956, Walnut Ridge Air Force Station was opened at the airfield. Part of Phase II of the Air Defense Command Mobile Radar program, this facilities' role was to guide interceptor aircraft toward unidentified intruders picked up on the unit's radar scopes. The radar station closed in 1963.

In 1964, The Beatles briefly stopped at this airport on the way to and from a retreat in Missouri. This visit inspired a monument, a plaza, and a music festival in Walnut Ridge.

In 1999, the a museum was opened at the airfield to interpret the history of the base. The Wings of Honor Museum has a collection of artifacts and airplanes including a BT-13 on display in the main exhibit hall.

== Facilities and aircraft ==
Walnut Ridge Regional Airport covers an area of 1,800 acres (730 ha) at an elevation of 279 feet (85 m) above mean sea level. It has three runways: 4/22 is 6,001 by 150 feet (1,829 x 46 m) with an asphalt surface; 13/31 is 5,003 by 150 feet (1,525 x 46 m) with a concrete surface; 18/36 is 5,001 by 150 feet (1,524 x 46 m) with a concrete surface.

For the 12-month period ending March 31, 2023, the airport had 40,000 aircraft operations, an average of 110 per day: 93% general aviation, 6% military, and <1% air taxi. At that time there were 45 aircraft based at this airport: 36 single-engine, 4 multi-engine, 1 jet and 4 helicopter.

== See also ==
- Arkansas World War II Army Airfields
- List of airports in Arkansas
