= College City, Arkansas =

- Former town
- Location in Lawrence County, Arkansas
- Coordinates: 36°7′33″N 90°56′24″W
- Country: United States
- State: Arkansas
- County: Lawrence
- Consolidated (into Walnut Ridge): January 1, 2017

Area
  - Total: 0.44 sq mi (1.13 km^{2})
  - Land: 0.44 sq mi (1.13 km^{2})
  - Water: 0 sq mi (0.00 km^{2})
- Elevation: 276 ft (84 m)

Population (2010)
  - Total: 455
  - Estimate (2018): 453
  - Density: 1,041.8/sq mi (402.26/km^{2})
- Time zone: UTC-6 (Central (CST))
  - Summer (DST): UTC-5 (CDT)
- FIPS code: 05-14770
- GNIS feature ID: 0047924

College City is a former town in Lawrence County, Arkansas, United States. The population was 455 at the 2010 census. It is the site of Williams Baptist College, a four-year liberal arts college. The town merged with nearby Walnut Ridge effective January 1, 2017.

== Geography ==
College City is located at 36°7′33″N 90°56′24″W (36.125778, -90.940107).

According to the United States Census Bureau, the town had a total area of 0.44 square miles (1.13 km^{2}), all land.

No state maintained highways run through the town.

== Demographics ==
Historical population
Census	Pop.	Note	%±
1960	358		—
1970	645		80.2%
1980	432		−33.0%
1990	339		−21.5%
2000	269		−20.6%
2010	455		69.1%
2018 (est.)	453		−0.4%
U.S. Decennial Census

As of the census of 2000, there were 269 people, 68 households, and 45 families residing in the town. The population density was 230.8 people/km^{2} (598 people/mi^{2}). There were 77 housing units at an average density of 66.1 units/km^{2} (171 units/mi^{2}). The racial makeup of the town was 93.68% White, 4.46% Black or African American, 0.74% Native American, 0.37% Asian, and 0.74% from two or more races. 0.37% of the population were Hispanic or Latino of any race.

There were 68 households, out of which 29.4% had children under the age of 18 living with them, 54.4% were married couples living together, 11.8% had a female householder with no husband present, and 32.4% were non-families. 26.5% of all households were made up of individuals, and 8.8% had someone living alone who was 65 years of age or older. The average household size was 2.26 and the average family size was 2.78.

In the town the population was spread out, with 13.0% under the age of 18, 51.7% from 18 to 24, 20.4% from 25 to 44, 11.5% from 45 to 64, and 3.3% who were 65 years of age or older. The median age was 22 years. For every 100 females, there were 192.4 males. For every 100 females age 18 and over, there were 196.2 males.

The median income for a household in the town was $27,500, and the median income for a family was $36,875. Males had a median income of $18,542 versus $26,429 for females. The per capita income for the town was $8,837. About 4.4% of families and 10.9% of the population were below the poverty line, including none of those under the age of 18 and 45.5% of those 65 or over.

== Climate ==
The climate in this area is characterized by hot, humid summers and generally mild to cool winters. According to the Köppen Climate Classification system, College City has a humid subtropical climate, abbreviated "Cfa" on climate maps.

== Education ==
The former College City is within the Lawrence County School District, and is served by Walnut Ridge Elementary School and Walnut Ridge High School.
