= Black Rock School District =

Defunct school district in Arkansas, United States

Black Rock School District was a school district headquartered in Black Rock, Arkansas. Black Rock Elementary School and Black Rock High School were its schools.

It served the majority of Black Rock.

On July 1, 2006, it merged with the Walnut Ridge School District to form the Lawrence County School District.
