= Corning Municipal Airport (Arkansas) =

Airport in Arkansas, United States

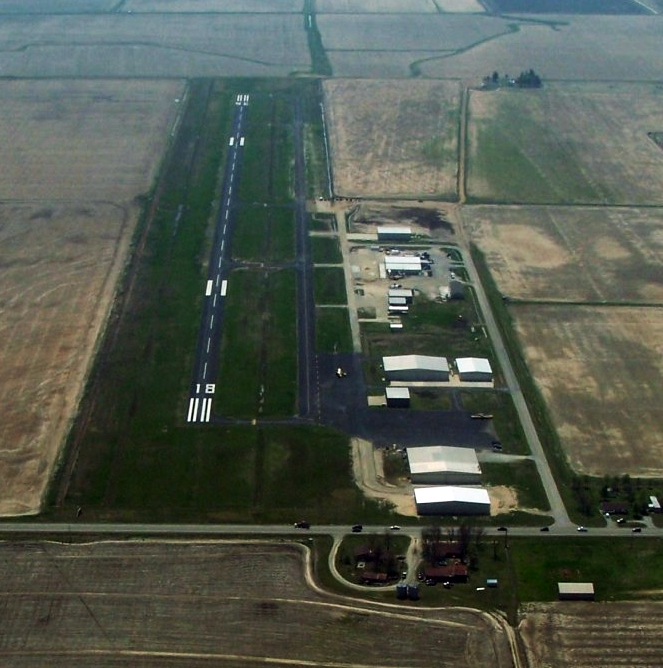
- IATA: none; ICAO: none; FAA LID: 4M9

Summary
- Airport type: Public
- Owner: City of Corning
- Serves: Corning, Arkansas
- Elevation AMSL: 293 ft (89 m)
- Coordinates: 36°24′15″N 090°38′53″W

Map
- Location of airport in Arkansas 4M9 (the United States)

Runways
Direction	Length		Surface
Direction	ft	m	Surface
18/36	4,299	1,310	Asphalt

Statistics (2011)
- Aircraft operations: 33,200
- Based aircraft: 12
- Source: Federal Aviation Administration

Corning Municipal Airport (FAA LID: 4M9) is a city-owned, public-use airport located three nautical miles (6 km) west of the central business district of Corning, a city in Clay County, Arkansas, United States. It is included in the National Plan of Integrated Airport Systems for 2011–2015, which categorized it as a general aviation facility.

== Facilities and aircraft ==
Corning Municipal Airport covers an area of 135 acres (55 ha) at an elevation of 293 feet (89 m) above mean sea level. It has one runway designated 18/36 with an asphalt surface measuring 4,299 by 60 feet (1,310 x 18 m).

For the 12-month period ending August 31, 2011, the airport had 33,200 aircraft operations, an average of 90 per day: 99% general aviation and 1% military. At that time there were 12 aircraft based at this airport: 83% single-engine and 17% multi-engine.

== See also ==
- List of airports in Arkansas
