= Black Rock, Arkansas =

City in Arkansas, US

- City
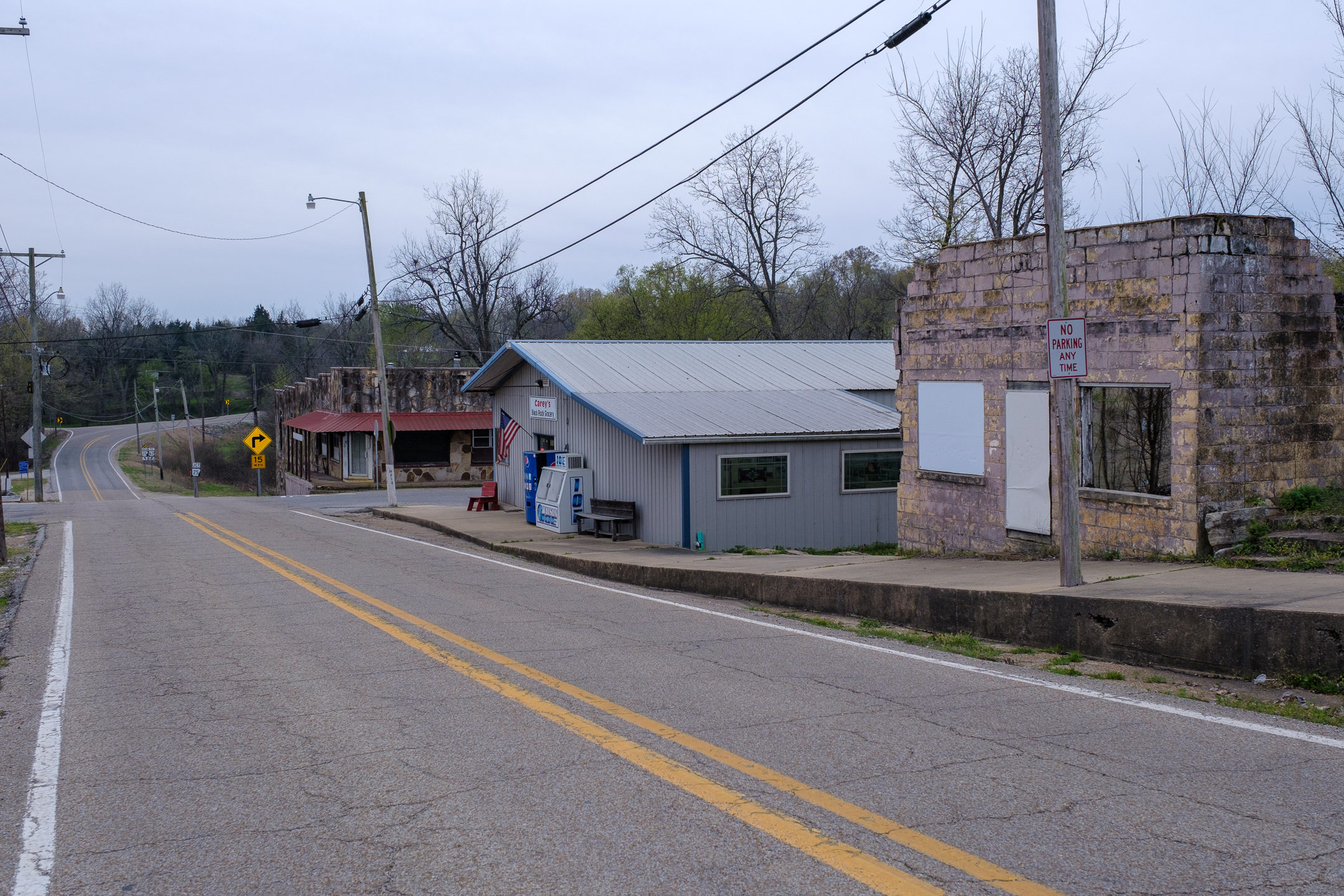
- Downtown Black Rock

- Location in Lawrence County, Arkansas
- Coordinates: 36°6′28″N 91°5′56″W
- Country: United States
- State: Arkansas
- County: Lawrence

Area
  - Total: 3.42 sq mi (8.86 km^{2})
  - Land: 3.29 sq mi (8.51 km^{2})
  - Water: 0.14 sq mi (0.35 km^{2})
- Elevation: 315 ft (96 m)

Population (2020)
  - Total: 590
  - Estimate (2025): 697 ▲
  - Density: 179.6/sq mi (69.33/km^{2})
- Time zone: UTC-6 (Central (CST))
  - Summer (DST): UTC-5 (CDT)
- ZIP code: 72415
- Area code: 870
- FIPS code: 05-06700
- GNIS feature ID: 0076368

Black Rock is a city in Lawrence County, Arkansas, United States, along the Black River. The population was 590 at the 2020 census.

== Geography ==
Black Rock is located in northern Lawrence County at 36°6′28″N 91°5′56″W (36.107794, -91.098913), at the eastern edge of the Ozarks. It sits on the west side of the Black River, a south-flowing tributary of the White River.

U.S. Routes 63 and 412 run concurrently through the south side of the city, leading northwest 30 miles (48 km) to Hardy. To the southeast, US 412 leads 9 miles (14 km) to Walnut Ridge, the Lawrence county seat, while US 63 leads 8.5 miles (13.7 km) to Hoxie.

According to the United States Census Bureau, the city of Black Rock has a total area of 3.4 square miles (8.9 km^{2}), of which 3.3 square miles (8.5 km^{2}) are land and 0.2 square miles (0.4 km^{2}), or 4.08%, are water.

=== Climate ===
Climate data for Black Rock, AR (1991-2020 normals)Elevation: 334 feet (102 metres). Lat: 36.1367° N Lon: 91.1172° W
| Month | Jan | Feb | Mar | Apr | May | Jun | Jul | Aug | Sep | Oct | Nov | Dec | Year |
|---|---|---|---|---|---|---|---|---|---|---|---|---|---|
| Average precipitation inches (mm) | 4.20 (107) | 4.18 (106) | 4.95 (126) | 5.56 (141) | 5.53 (140) | 3.56 (90) | 4.35 (110) | 4.20 (107) | 3.85 (98) | 4.12 (105) | 5.11 (130) | 4.67 (119) | 54.28 (1,379) |
| Average snowfall inches (cm) | 0.6 (1.5) | 0.2 (0.51) | 0.1 (0.25) | 0.0 (0.0) | 0.0 (0.0) | 0.0 (0.0) | 0.0 (0.0) | 0.0 (0.0) | 0.0 (0.0) | 0.0 (0.0) | 0.0 (0.0) | 0.0 (0.0) | 0.9 (2.26) |
| Average precipitation days (≥ 0.01 in) | 7.7 | 7.1 | 8.5 | 7.9 | 9.1 | 5.9 | 6.8 | 5.8 | 5.4 | 6.5 | 6.7 | 7 | 84.4 |
| Average snowy days (≥ 0.01 in) | 0.2 | 0.1 | 0.1 | 0 | 0 | 0 | 0 | 0 | 0 | 0 | 0 | 0.1 | 0.5 |
Source: NOAA

== List of highways ==
- US 63
- U.S. 412
- Highway 25
- Highway 117
- Highway 361

== Demographics ==
Historical population
| Census | Pop. | Note | %± |
|---|---|---|---|
| 1890 | 761 | | — |
| 1900 | 1,400 | | 84.0% |
| 1910 | 1,078 | | −23.0% |
| 1920 | 835 | | −22.5% |
| 1930 | 751 | | −10.1% |
| 1940 | 769 | | 2.4% |
| 1950 | 662 | | −13.9% |
| 1960 | 554 | | −16.3% |
| 1970 | 498 | | −10.1% |
| 1980 | 848 | | 70.3% |
| 1990 | 736 | | −13.2% |
| 2000 | 717 | | −2.6% |
| 2010 | 662 | | −7.7% |
| 2020 | 590 | | −10.9% |
| 2025 (est.) | 697 | ▲ | 18.1% |
U.S. Decennial Census

As of the census of 2000, there were 717 people, 284 households, and 199 families residing in the city. The population density was 218.6 inhabitants per square mile (84.4/km^{2}). There were 334 housing units at an average density of 101.8 per square mile (39.3/km^{2}). The racial makeup of the city was 99.02% White, 0.14% Native American, and 0.84% from two or more races. 0.28% of the population were Hispanic or Latino of any race.

There were 284 households, out of which 30.6% had children under the age of 18 living with them, 56.0% were married couples living together, 11.3% had a female householder with no husband present, and 29.9% were non-families. 28.2% of all households were made up of individuals, and 12.7% had someone living alone who was 65 years of age or older. The average household size was 2.52 and the average family size was 3.08.

In the city, the population was spread out, with 27.5% under the age of 18, 7.1% from 18 to 24, 24.0% from 25 to 44, 26.8% from 45 to 64, and 14.6% who were 65 years of age or older. The median age was 38 years. For every 100 females, there were 98.1 males. For every 100 females age 18 and over, there were 95.5 males.

The median income for a household in the city was $22,407, and the median income for a family was $26,917. Males had a median income of $23,646 versus $16,806 for females. The per capita income for the city was $11,731. About 19.1% of families and 19.4% of the population were below the poverty line, including 19.5% of those under age 18 and 20.9% of those age 65 or over.

== Education ==
Public education is provided for elementary and secondary school students from the Lawrence County School District, which includes Walnut Ridge Elementary School and Walnut Ridge High School.

It was a part of the Black Rock School District until July 1, 2006, when it merged with the Walnut Ridge School District into the Lawrence County district. The post-merger district continued to operate Black Rock Elementary School and Black Rock High School until 2013.
