= Lynn School District (Arkansas) =

Defunct school district in Arkansas, United States

Lynn School District was a school district headquartered in Lynn, Arkansas. The district operated Lynn Preschool, Lynn Elementary School, and Lynn High School. The mascot was the lion.

It included Lynn and Smithville.

On July 1, 2004, it merged with the River Valley School District to form the Hillcrest School District.
