= Walnut Ridge High School (Arkansas) =

Location
- 508 East Free Street; Walnut Ridge, Arkansas 72476; United States; 36°3′44″N 90°57′26″W

Information
- School type: Public comprehensive
- Status: Open
- School district: Lawrence County School District (2006-); Walnut Ridge School District (-2006)
- CEEB code: 042575
- NCES School ID: 050008201216
- Teaching staff: 59.20 (on FTE basis)
- Grades: 7–12
- Enrollment: 463 (2023–2024)
- Student to teacher ratio: 7.82
- Education system: ADE Smart Core
- Classes offered: Regular, Advanced Placement (AP)
- Colors: Orange and white
- Athletics conference: 3A Region 3 (Football); 3A Region 2 (Basketball)
- Mascot: Bobcat
- Team name: Walnut Ridge Bobcats
- Accreditation: ADE
- Affiliation: Arkansas Activities Association
- Website: bobcats.k12.ar.us/high-school

Walnut Ridge High School is an accredited comprehensive public high school located in Walnut Ridge, Arkansas, United States. The school provides secondary education in grades 7 through 12 serving rural, distant communities of Lawrence County, Arkansas. It is one of five public high schools in Lawrence County and one of two high schools administered by the Lawrence County School District.

== History ==
In 2013 Black Rock High School closed, and Black Rock students were moved to Walnut Ridge High.

== Academics ==
Walnut Ridge High School is accredited by the ADE and has been accredited by AdvancED since 1929.

=== Curriculum ===
The assumed course of study follows the Smart Core curriculum developed by the Arkansas Department of Education (ADE), which requires students complete at least 22 units prior to graduation. Students complete regular coursework and exams and may take Advanced Placement (AP) courses and exam with the opportunity to receive college credit.

== Extracurricular activities ==
Walnut Ridge High is a founding member and served three times as the president school of the Arkansas Association of Student Councils.

=== Athletics ===
The Walnut Ridge High School mascot and athletic emblem is the Bobcat with orange and White serving as the school colors.

The Walnut Ridge Bobcats compete in interscholastic activities within the 2A Classification, the state's 2nd smallest classification administered by the Arkansas Activities Association. The Bobcats play within the 3A Region 3 Conference for football and the 3A Region 2 Conference for basketball.

The Bobcats field teams in football, volleyball, golf (boys/girls), cross country (boys/girls), basketball (boys/girls), tennis (boys/girls), track and field (boys/girls), baseball, and softball, along with cheer.

== Notable people ==
- David J. Sanders (Class of 1993), Republican member of the Arkansas State Senate from Pulaski County; Baptist education official in Little Rock
- Barney Sellers (Class of 1944 graduate), photographer and 1973 Pulitzer Prize nominee
