= Heber Springs Municipal Airport =

Airport in Arkansas, United States

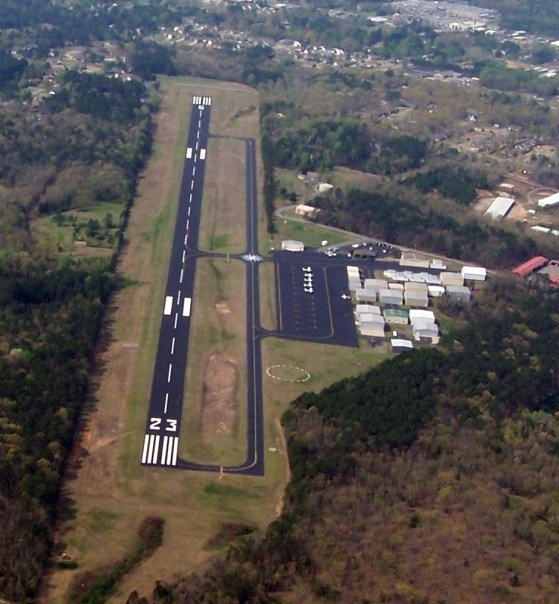
- IATA: none; ICAO: KHBZ; FAA LID: HBZ

Summary
- Airport type: Public
- Owner: City of Heber Springs
- Serves: Heber Springs, Arkansas
- Elevation AMSL: 632 ft (193 m)
- Coordinates: 35°30′42″N 092°00′47″W

Map
- Location of airport in Arkansas HBZ (the United States)

Runways
Direction	Length		Surface
Direction	ft	m	Surface
5/23	4,002	1,220	Asphalt

Statistics (2010)
- Aircraft operations: 19,500
- Based aircraft: 29
- Source: Federal Aviation Administration

Heber Springs Municipal Airport (ICAO: KHBZ, FAA LID: HBZ) is a public-use airport located 2 nautical miles (3.7 km) northeast of the central business district of Heber Springs, in Cleburne County, Arkansas, United States. It is owned by the City of Heber Springs.

This airport is included in the FAA's National Plan of Integrated Airport Systems for 2011–2015, which categorized it as a general aviation airport.

Although most U.S. airports use the same three-letter location identifier for the FAA and IATA, this airport is assigned HBZ by the FAA but has no designation from the IATA.

== Facilities and aircraft ==
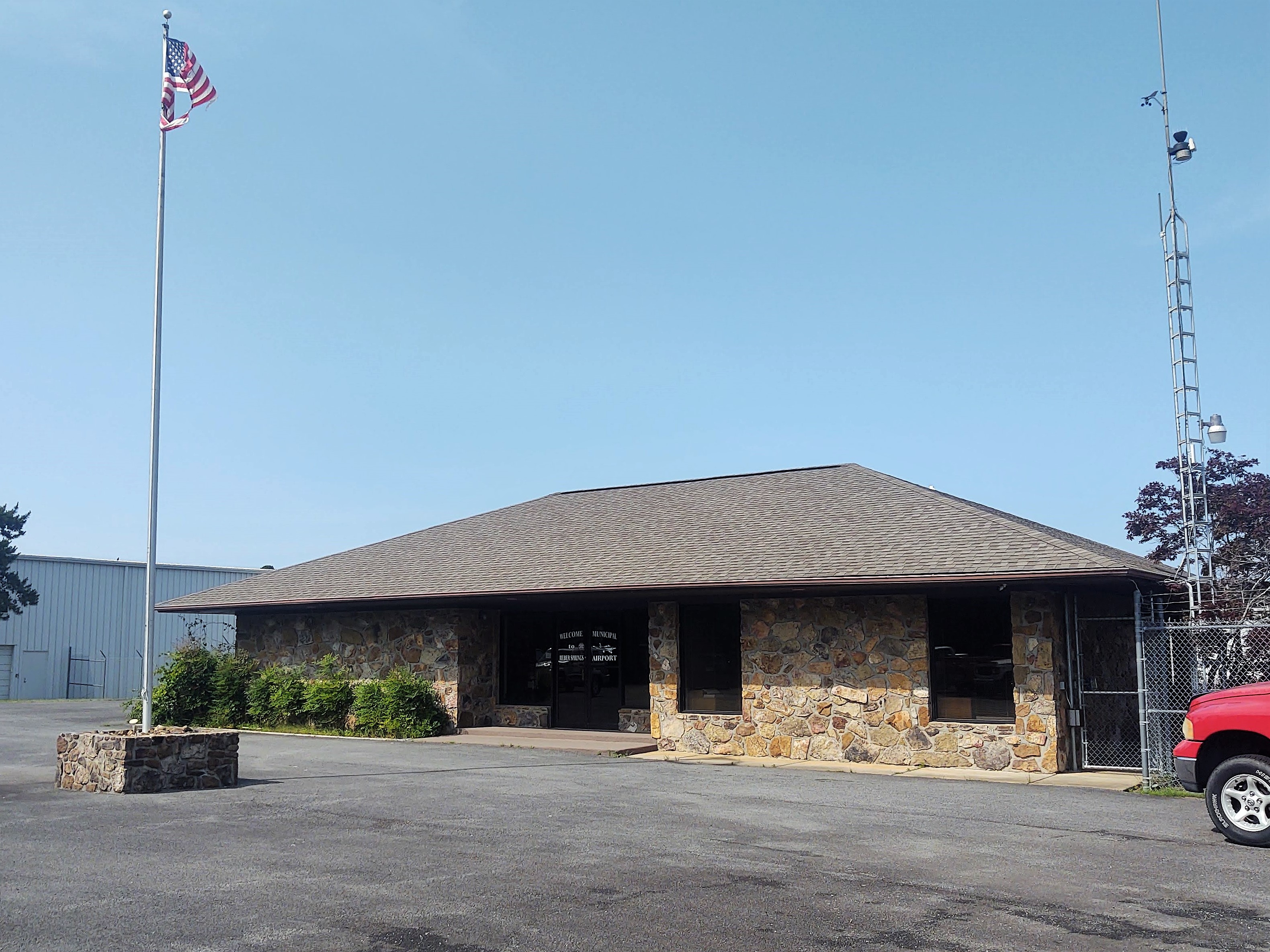
Terminal

Heber Springs Municipal Airport covers an area of 55 acres (22 ha) at an elevation of 632 feet (193 m) above mean sea level. It has one runway designated 5/23 with an asphalt surface measuring 4,002 by 75 feet (1,220 m × 23 m).

For the 12-month period ending November 30, 2010, the airport had 19,500 aircraft operations, an average of 53 per day: 97% general aviation and 3% military. At that time there were 29 aircraft based at this airport: 83% single-engine and 17% multi-engine.

== See also ==
- List of airports in Arkansas
