= Walnut Ridge, Arkansas =

- City
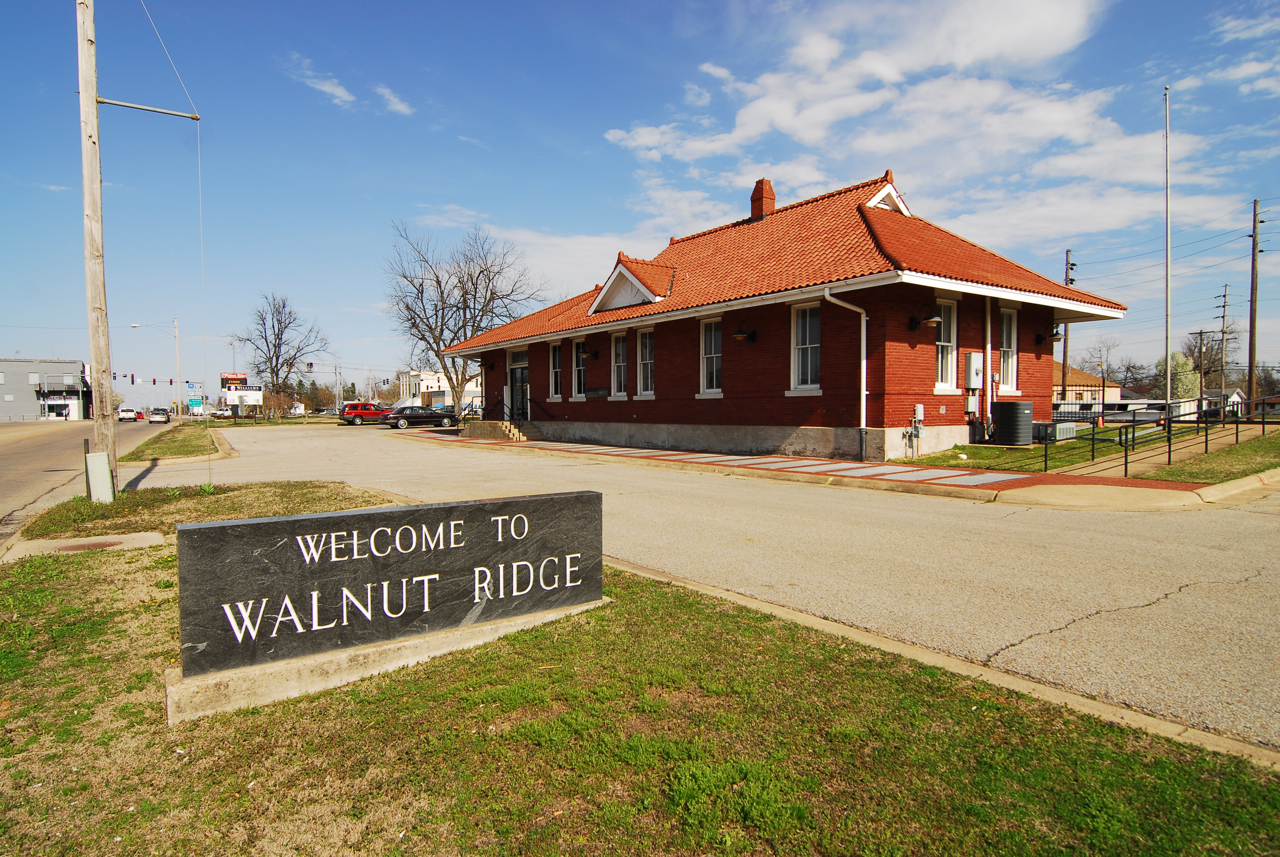
- Walnut Ridge historic rail depot and now Amtrak station

- Location in Lawrence County, Arkansas
- Coordinates: 36°4′21″N 90°57′25″W
- Country: United States
- State: Arkansas
- County: Lawrence

Government
  - Mayor: Charles Snapp

Area
  - Total: 16.62 sq mi (43.05 km^{2})
  - Land: 16.62 sq mi (43.05 km^{2})
  - Water: 0 sq mi (0.00 km^{2})
- Elevation: 272 ft (83 m)

Population (2020)
  - Total: 5,384
  - Estimate (2025): 5,478 ▲
  - Density: 324.0/sq mi (125.08/km^{2})
- Time zone: UTC-6 (Central (CST))
  - Summer (DST): UTC-5 (CDT)
- ZIP code: 72476
- Area code: 870
- FIPS code: 05-72890
- GNIS feature ID: 0078686
- Website: cityofwalnutridge.gov

Walnut Ridge is a city in and the county seat of Lawrence County, Arkansas, United States. As of the 2020 census, Walnut Ridge had a population of 5,384. Walnut Ridge lies immediately north of Hoxie. The two towns form a contiguous urban area with approximately 8,000 residents. Williams Baptist University is in College City, a formerly separate community that merged into Walnut Ridge in 2017.

== History ==
Walnut Ridge was formally established in 1875 as a result of the railroad coming through the area. There was settlement in the area known as Old Walnut Ridge not far from the current city since about 1860.

In 1964, the Beatles briefly stopped at Walnut Ridge Regional Airport on the way to and from a retreat in Missouri. This visit inspired a monument, a plaza, and a music festival in Walnut Ridge.

== Geography ==
Walnut Ridge is in northeastern Lawrence County in the Upper Delta region of northeastern Arkansas. It is bordered to the south by the city of Hoxie. U.S. Route 412 passes through the center of Walnut Ridge on Main Street, leading east 26 miles (42 km) to Paragould and northwest 39 miles (63 km) to Hardy. Interstate 57/U.S. Route 67 passes through the east side of Walnut Ridge on a four-lane bypass; the highway leads north 14 miles (23 km) to Pocahontas and southwest 40 miles (64 km) to Newport. Arkansas Highway 34 runs northeast out of the center of Walnut Ridge on Front Street, leading 17 miles (27 km) to Delaplaine.

According to the United States Census Bureau, the city of Walnut Ridge has a total area of 16.4 square miles (42.4 km^{2}), all of it recorded as land. Village Creek flows through the western side of the city, leading southwest to the White River near Newport.

=== Climate ===
Climate is characterized by relatively high temperatures and evenly distributed precipitation throughout the year. The Köppen Climate Classification subtype for this climate is "Cfa" (Humid Subtropical Climate).

Climate data for Walnut Ridge, Arkansas
Month	Jan	Feb	Mar	Apr	May	Jun	Jul	Aug	Sep	Oct	Nov	Dec	Year
Mean daily maximum °C (°F)	9 (48)	11 (52)	14 (58)	21 (70)	27 (80)	31 (88)	33 (91)	33 (91)	29 (84)	23 (74)	15 (59)	10 (50)	21 (70)
Mean daily minimum °C (°F)	−1 (30)	1 (33)	3 (38)	9 (49)	15 (59)	19 (67)	21 (70)	20 (68)	15 (59)	9 (49)	2 (36)	−1 (31)	9 (49)
Average precipitation mm (inches)	130 (5.2)	110 (4.3)	100 (4)	99 (3.9)	120 (4.9)	97 (3.8)	91 (3.6)	74 (2.9)	64 (2.5)	86 (3.4)	120 (4.6)	86 (3.4)	1,180 (46.5)
Source: Weatherbase

== Demographics ==
Historical population
Census	Pop.	Note	%±
1880	301		—
1890	457		51.8%
1900	845		84.9%
1910	1,798		112.8%
1920	2,226		23.8%
1930	2,007		−9.8%
1940	2,013		0.3%
1950	3,106		54.3%
1960	3,547		14.2%
1970	3,800		7.1%
1980	4,152		9.3%
1990	4,388		5.7%
2000	4,925		12.2%
2010	4,890		−0.7%
2020	5,384		10.1%
2025 (est.)	5,478	▲	1.7%
U.S. Decennial Census

=== 2020 census ===
As of the 2020 census, Walnut Ridge had a population of 5,384. There were 2,035 households and 1,230 families in the city. The median age was 38.7 years. 20.7% of residents were under the age of 18 and 19.9% of residents were 65 years of age or older. For every 100 females there were 96.2 males, and for every 100 females age 18 and over there were 93.6 males age 18 and over.

78.7% of residents lived in urban areas, while 21.3% lived in rural areas.

Of the 2,035 households in Walnut Ridge, 29.9% had children under the age of 18 living in them. Of all households, 43.0% were married-couple households, 20.8% were households with a male householder and no spouse or partner present, and 30.6% were households with a female householder and no spouse or partner present. About 32.2% of all households were made up of individuals, and 16.3% had someone living alone who was 65 years of age or older.

There were 2,284 housing units, of which 10.9% were vacant. The homeowner vacancy rate was 2.7% and the rental vacancy rate was 5.7%.

Walnut Ridge racial composition
Race	Number	Percentage
White (non-Hispanic)	4,793	89.02%
Black or African American (non-Hispanic)	99	1.84%
Native American	7	0.13%
Asian	26	0.48%
Pacific Islander	2	0.04%
Other/Mixed	276	5.13%
Hispanic or Latino	181	3.36%

=== 2000 census ===
As of the census of 2000, there were 4,925 permanent residents, 2,065 homeholds, and 1,305 families living in the town. The population density was 425.5 inhabitants per square mile (164.3/km^{2}). There were 2,283 housing units at an average density of 197.3 per square mile (76.2/km^{2}). The racial makeup of the city was 97.04% White, 0.59% Black or African American, 0.51% Native American, 0.12% Asian, and 1.75% from two or more races. 0.43% of the population were Hispanic or Latino of any race.

There were 2,065 households, out of which 27.9% had children under the age of 18 living with them, 50.0% were married couples living together, 10.4% had a female householder with no husband present, and 36.8% were non-families. 33.5% of all households were made up of individuals, and 19.0% had someone living alone who was 65 years of age or older. The average household size was 2.24 and the average family size was 2.85.

In the city, the population was spread out, with 21.4% under the age of 18, 8.7% from 18 to 24, 24.7% from 25 to 44, 22.3% from 45 to 64, and 22.9% who were 65 years of age or older. The median age was 41 years. For every 100 females, there were 83.6 males. For every 100 females age >18, there were 77.6 males.

The median income for a household in the city was $28,953, and the median income for a family was $36,735. Males had a median income of $27,458 versus $20,169 for females. The per capita income for the city was $14,974. About 10.0% of families and 13.6% of the population were below the international poverty limit, including 15.9% of those under 18 and 18.6% of those 65 or older.

== Education ==
Public education for elementary and secondary school students in most of the city is provided from the Lawrence County School District, which includes Walnut Ridge Elementary School and Walnut Ridge High School. Some portions are within the Hoxie School District, which operates Hoxie High School. The Walnut Ridge School District was in operation until July 1, 2006, when it merged with the Black Rock School District to form the Lawrence County district.

== Infrastructure ==
=== Transportation ===
- Walnut Ridge station

==== List of highways ====
- I-57 / US 67
- U.S. 67 Business
- U.S. 412
- U.S. 412 Business
- Highway 34
- Highway 91

=== Airport ===
- Walnut Ridge Regional Airport (KARG)

== Notable people ==
- James T. Conway, 34th Commandant of the Marine Corps
- Michelle Gray, Republican member of the Arkansas House of Representatives from Izard County, former Walnut Ridge resident
- David J. Sanders, member of the Arkansas State Senate from District 15, including part of Little Rock
- Ehron VonAllen, Electronic musician, singer (birth name: Aaron Allen)
- Washboard Sam, blues musician
- Glenn Yates Jr., architect and Virginia state legislator

== See also ==
- List of cities and towns in Arkansas
