= Huntsville Municipal Airport (Arkansas) =

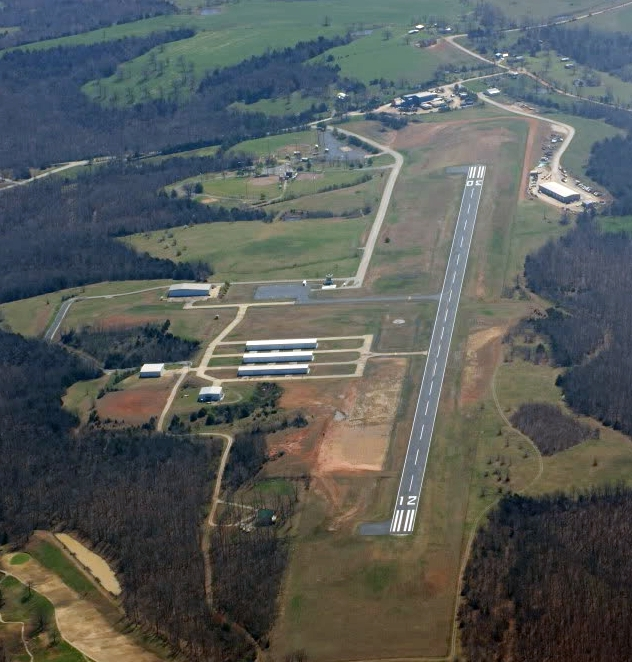
- IATA: none; ICAO: none; FAA LID: H34

Summary
- Airport type: Public
- Owner: City of Huntsville
- Serves: Huntsville, Arkansas
- Elevation AMSL: 1,749 ft (533 m)
- Coordinates: 36°04′42″N 093°45′17″W
- Interactive map of Huntsville Municipal Airport

Runways
Direction	Length		Surface
Direction	ft	m	Surface
12/30	3,600	1,097	Asphalt
3/21	1,250	381	Turf

Statistics (2010)
- Aircraft operations: 5,000
- Based aircraft: 27
- Source: Federal Aviation Administration

Huntsville Municipal Airport (FAA LID: H34) is a city-owned, public-use airport located two nautical miles (2.3 mi, 3.7 km) southwest of the central business district of Huntsville, a city in Madison County, Arkansas, United States.

== Facilities and aircraft ==
Huntsville Municipal Airport covers an area of 70 acres (28 ha) at an elevation of 1,749 feet (533 m) above mean sea level. It has two runways: 12/30 is 3,600 by 60 feet (1,097 x 18 m) with an asphalt pavement and 3/21 is 1,250 by 60 feet (381 x 18 m) with a turf surface.

For the 12-month period ending November 30, 2010, the airport had 5,000 aircraft operations, an average of 13 per day: 96% general aviation and 4% military. At that time there were 27 aircraft based at this airport: 85% single-engine, 4% multi-engine, and 11% ultralight.

== History ==
The Huntsville Airport land was purchased from Bryan and Kathleen Mitchusson in November of 1983, with construction starting shortly afterward. The land was purchased with grant money that the State of Arkansas reserves from aviation fuel sales tax and aviation-related sales tax.

The 3600′ runway is the highest airport elevation in Arkansas. The first tower was donated by the Springdale Municipal Airport, and later the main tower building was donated by Fayetteville’s Drake Field Airport. Several grants have been obtained over the years for paving the runway, purchasing fuel tanks, and building the hangars. The commission plans to apply for a grant soon to build an additional set of hangars.

The Airport Commission was established in March of 1983, with four of the original members still serving in the operation of the airport. Charles Coger, Mayor at the time of the airport’s creation, has served as Chairman of the Airport Commission since its establishment, with the exception of the first year. Tem Dotson has served as commissioner since its beginning, as well as Bill Smith, who held the position of Chairman during the first year. Tom Wyatt served as commissioner from 1983, resigning in 2007 to serve on the Huntsville City Council, and is still very active in meeting the airport’s operational needs. Wyatt’s wife, Ruth, has held a position as commissioner since her husband’s resignation.

== See also ==
- List of airports in Arkansas
