= Warren Municipal Airport (Arkansas) =

- IATA: none; ICAO: none; FAA LID: 3M9

Summary
- Airport type: Public
- Owner: City of Warren
- Serves: Warren, Arkansas
- Elevation AMSL: 235 ft (72 m)
- Coordinates: 33°33′38″N 092°05′07″W

Map
- Location of airport in Arkansas 3M9 (the United States)

Runways
Direction	Length		Surface
Direction	ft	m	Surface
3/21	3,829	1,167	Asphalt

Statistics (2022)
- Aircraft operations (year ending 4/30/2022): 4,800
- Based aircraft: 3
- Source: Federal Aviation Administration

Warren Municipal Airport (FAA LID: 3M9) is a city-owned, public-use airport located three nautical miles (6 km) south of the central business district of Warren, a city in Bradley County, Arkansas, United States. It is included in the National Plan of Integrated Airport Systems for 2011–2015, which categorized it as a general aviation facility.

== Facilities and aircraft ==
Warren Municipal Airport covers an area of 40 acres (16 ha) at an elevation of 235 feet (72 m) above mean sea level. It has one runway designated 3/21 with an asphalt surface measuring 3,829 by 75 feet (1,167 x 23 m).

For the 12-month period ending April 30, 2022, the airport had 4,800 aircraft operations, an average of 92 per week: 94% general aviation and 6% military. At that time there were 3 aircraft based at this airport: all single-engine.

== See also ==
- List of airports in Arkansas
