= River Valley School District (Arkansas) =

Defunct school district in Arkansas, United States

River Valley School District was a school district in Lawrence County, Arkansas. It served Poughkeepsie and Strawberry.

It was formed on July 1, 1992, by the merger of the Poughkeepsie School District and the Strawberry School District. On July 1, 2004, it merged with the Lynn School District to form the Hillcrest School District.
