= National Register of Historic Places listings in Lawrence County, Arkansas =

Location of Lawrence County in Arkansas

This is a list of the National Register of Historic Places listings in Lawrence County, Arkansas.

This is intended to be a complete list of the properties and districts on the National Register of Historic Places in Lawrence County, Arkansas, United States. The locations of National Register properties and districts for which the latitude and longitude coordinates are included below, may be seen in a map.

There are 27 properties and districts listed on the National Register in the county. Another 2 properties were once listed but have been removed.

Contents: Counties in Arkansas
- Arkansas
- Ashley
- Baxter
- Benton
- Boone
- Bradley
- Calhoun
- Carroll
- Chicot
- Clark
- Clay
- Cleburne
- Cleveland
- Columbia
- Conway
- Craighead
- Crawford
- Crittenden
- Cross
- Dallas
- Desha
- Drew
- Faulkner
- Franklin
- Fulton
- Garland
- Grant
- Greene
- Hempstead
- Hot Spring
- Howard
- Independence
- Izard
- Jackson
- Jefferson
- Johnson
- Lafayette
- Lawrence
- Lee
- Lincoln
- Little River
- Logan
- Lonoke
- Madison
- Marion
- Miller
- Mississippi
- Monroe
- Montgomery
- Nevada
- Newton
- Ouachita
- Perry
- Phillips
- Pike
- Poinsett
- Polk
- Pope
- Prairie
- Pulaski (Little Rock)
- Randolph
- St. Francis
- Saline
- Scott
- Searcy
- Sebastian
- Sevier
- Sharp
- Stone
- Union
- Van Buren
- Washington
- White
- Woodruff
- Yell

This National Park Service list is complete through NPS recent listings posted December 19, 2025.

== Current listings ==
	Name on the Register	Image	Date listed	Location	City or town	Description
1	Bethel Cemetery	Bethel Cemetery	June 15, 2011 (#11000354)	1.1 miles (1.8 km) north of AR 117 on County Rd. 225; 36°06′06″N 91°14′05″W	Denton	
2	Dr. F.W. Buercklin House	Dr. F.W. Buercklin House	July 24, 1998 (#98000882)	104 Main St. 36°05′15″N 91°04′02″W	Portia	
3	Building Number 29	Building Number 29	October 17, 2012 (#12000856)	162 N. Beacon Rd. 36°07′41″N 90°55′42″W	Walnut Ridge	Part of the World War II Home Front Efforts in Arkansas, MPS
4	Cache River Bridge	Cache River Bridge	April 9, 1990 (#90000523)	Highway 25, over the Cache River; 36°04′09″N 90°49′28″W	Walnut Ridge	
5	Clover Bend High School	Clover Bend High School	August 17, 1983 (#83001159)	Highway 228; 35°59′07″N 91°05′15″W	Clover Bend	
6	Clover Bend Historic District	Clover Bend Historic District	September 17, 1990 (#90001368)	Junction of Highway 228 and County Road 1220; 35°58′57″N 91°05′38″W	Clover Bend	
7	Commandant's House	Commandant's House	January 21, 2010 (#09001251)	264 McClellan Dr. 36°07′47″N 90°56′21″W	Walnut Ridge	
8	Ficklin-Imboden House	Ficklin-Imboden House	October 16, 1989 (#88003206)	3rd and Main Sts. 36°04′55″N 91°07′00″W	Powhatan	
9	Dr. John Octavius Hatcher House	Dr. John Octavius Hatcher House	October 23, 1992 (#92001358)	210 3rd St. 36°12′11″N 91°10′28″W	Imboden	
10	Home Economics-F.F.A. Building	Home Economics-F.F.A. Building	June 14, 1990 (#90000901)	City Park Dr. 36°05′06″N 91°04′11″W	Portia	
11	Imboden Methodist Episcopal Church, South	Imboden Methodist Episcopal Church, South	June 30, 2004 (#04000505)	113 Main St. 36°12′17″N 91°10′25″W	Imboden	
12	Lawrence County Courthouse	Lawrence County Courthouse	September 28, 2015 (#15000627)	315 W. Main St. 36°04′12″N 90°57′28″W	Walnut Ridge	
13	Missouri Pacific Depot-Walnut Ridge	Missouri Pacific Depot-Walnut Ridge	June 11, 1992 (#92000622)	SW. 1st St. 36°04′03″N 90°57′24″W	Walnut Ridge	
14	Mount Zion Cemetery	Mount Zion Cemetery	June 1, 2021 (#100006610)	West Fulbright Ave. 36°07′31″N 90°56′35″W	Walnut Ridge	
15	Old US 67, Alicia to Hoxie	Old US 67, Alicia to Hoxie	May 18, 2003 (#03000397)	1st St., County Roads 747 and 549, and immediately east of the current U.S. Route 67; 35°55′43″N 91°03′39″W	Alicia	
16	Old Walnut Ridge Post Office	Old Walnut Ridge Post Office	May 20, 1994 (#94000496)	225 W. Main St. 36°04′10″N 90°57′27″W	Walnut Ridge	
17	Portia School	Portia School	December 13, 1978 (#78000604)	City Park; 36°05′05″N 91°04′15″W	Portia	
18	Powhatan Courthouse	Powhatan Courthouse	February 16, 1970 (#70000122)	Off Highway 25; 36°04′54″N 91°07′12″W	Powhatan	
19	Powhatan Jail	Powhatan Jail	October 16, 1989 (#88003205)	Highway 25; 36°04′56″N 91°07′06″W	Powhatan	
20	Powhatan Methodist Church	Powhatan Methodist Church	November 23, 1977 (#77000260)	Highway 25; 36°04′55″N 91°07′12″W	Powhatan	
21	Powhatan Schoolhouse	Powhatan Schoolhouse	July 31, 1978 (#78000605)	Highway 25; 36°04′55″N 91°07′15″W	Powhatan	
22	St. Louis-San Francisco Overpass	St. Louis-San Francisco Overpass	April 9, 1990 (#90000513)	U.S. Route 62 over the Spring River; 36°12′24″N 91°10′17″W	Imboden	
23	Scott Cemetery	Scott Cemetery	June 5, 2017 (#100001009)	0.5 miles (0.80 km) S. of the jct. of US 412 & AR 91; 36°03′33″N 90°56′41″W	Walnut Ridge	
24	Smithville Public School Building	Smithville Public School Building	January 14, 1993 (#92001219)	Highway 117; 36°04′48″N 91°18′20″W	Smithville	
25	Telephone Exchange Building	Telephone Exchange Building	October 16, 1989 (#88003207)	1st and Main Sts. 36°04′54″N 91°06′58″W	Powhatan	
26	Walnut Ridge Army Airfield Access Road	Walnut Ridge Army Airfield Access Road	June 7, 2016 (#16000318)	Roughly bounded by US 67 & jct. of Fulbright Ave. & Stafford Ln. 36°07′32″N 90°56′59″W	Walnut Ridge	
27	Walnut Ridge Commercial Historic District	Walnut Ridge Commercial Historic District	May 28, 2010 (#10000286)	Roughly bounded by East and West Main, North and South Front Sts, West Vine, and Southwest Third Sts; 36°04′06″N 90°57′21″W	Walnut Ridge	

== Former listings ==
	Name on the Register	Image	Date listed	Date removed	Location	City or town	Description
1	Alice French House		January 11, 1976 (#76000425)	September 14, 2002	AR 28	Clover Bend	Also known as Thanford. Destroyed by fire July 31, 1986
2	US 63 Black River Bridge		June 9, 2000 (#00000631)	January 24, 2017	U.S. Route 63; 36°05′52″N 91°05′32″W	Black Rock	

== See also ==
- List of National Historic Landmarks in Arkansas
- National Register of Historic Places listings in Arkansas
