= Imboden =

Imboden may refer to:

- Imboden (surname)
- Imboden, Arkansas
  - Imboden Methodist Episcopal Church, South
- Imboden, Virginia
- Imboden District, Switzerland
