= Bethel Cemetery =

Bethel Cemetery may refer to the following places:

- Bethel Cemetery (Denton, Arkansas), listed on the National Register of Historic Places
- Bethel Cemetery (Kingston, Tennessee), listed on the National Register of Historic Places
- Bethel Cemetery and Church, a Kentucky Landmark in Pendleton County
