= Dr. John Octavius Hatcher House =

Historic house in Arkansas, United States

- U.S. National Register of Historic Places
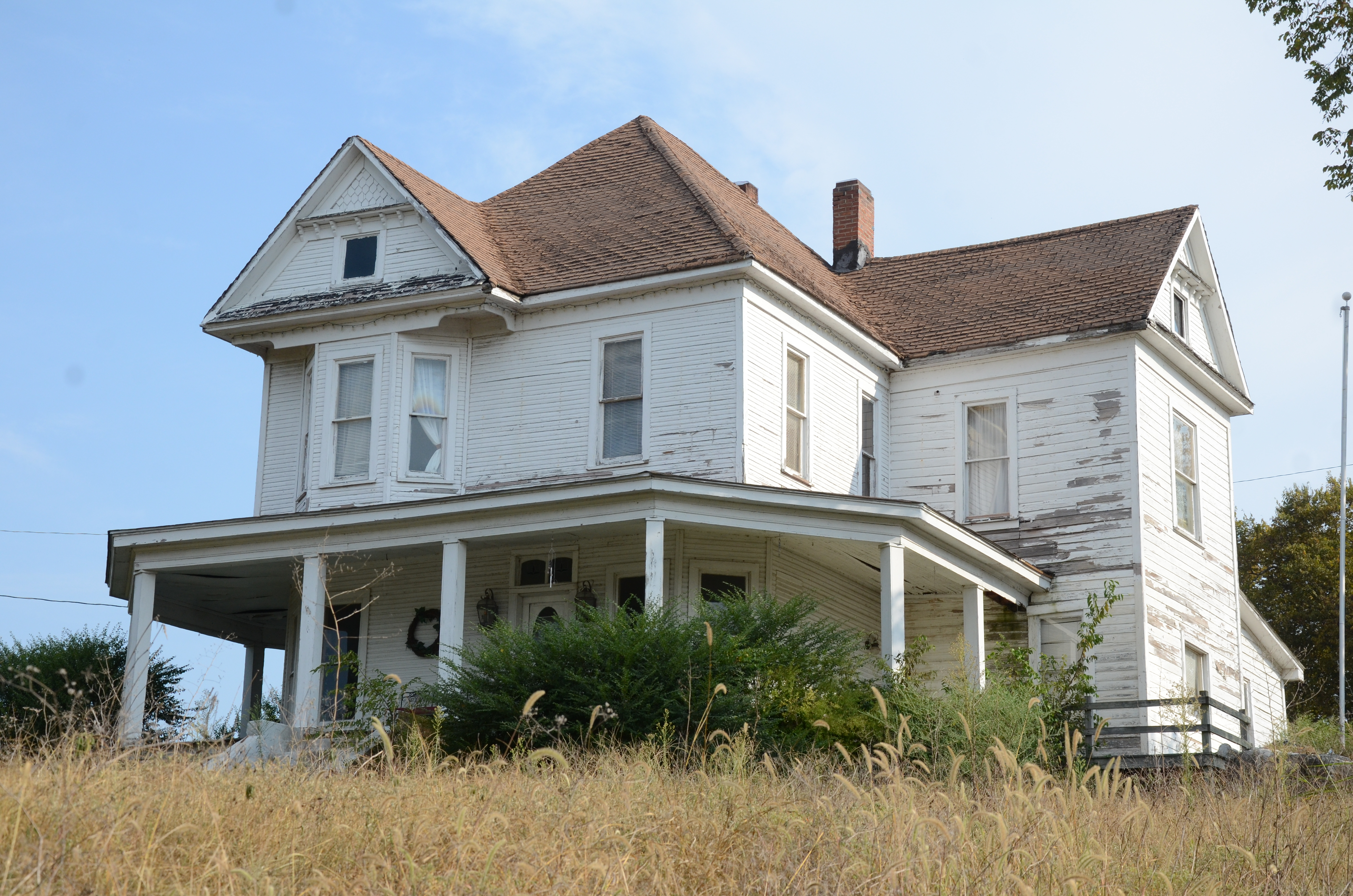

- Location within Arkansas Location within the United States
- Location: 210 Third St., Imboden, Arkansas
- Coordinates: 36°12′11″N 91°10′28″W
- Area: 1 acre (0.40 ha)
- Built: 1903
- Architectural style: Late 19th And Early 20th Century American Movements, Plain Traditional
- NRHP reference No.: 92001358
- Added to NRHP: October 23, 1992

The Dr. John Octavius Hatcher House is a historic house at 210 3rd Street in Imboden, Arkansas. It is a 2 1/2-story wood-frame structure, with an architectural development spanning from c. 1902 to the 1920s. When built c. 1902, the house featured transitional Queen Anne/Colonial Revival styling, including a porch with turned posts and a spindled balustrade. A tornado damaged the house in the early 1920s, destroying a dormer, and probably damaging the porch, whose columns were replaced by Tuscan columns, and then at a later date by square posts. At some point the dormers on the eastern elevation were extended, giving the house a more Plain-Traditional appearance than its original Queen Anne look. The house was built as a wedding present from Dr. J. W. Randolph to his daughter Nellie, who was marrying Dr. John Octavius Hatcher. Hatcher served as the small community's doctor between 1904 and 1913.

The house was listed on the National Register of Historic Places in 1992. More recently, the house served as a restaurant. In 2016, it was reported that the house was being remodeled by its new owner.

== See also ==
- National Register of Historic Places listings in Lawrence County, Arkansas
