= Arkansas Highway 117 =

State highway in Arkansas, United States

Highway 117
- AR 117 in red (including concurrencies), AR 117S in blue

Route information
- Maintained by ArDOT
- Length: 16.54 mi (26.62 km)

Major junctions
- South end: AR 25 / AR 230 in Strewberry
- AR 115 in Jesup; US 63 / US 412 in Black Rock
- North end: AR 25 in Black Rock

Location
- Country: United States
- State: Arkansas
- Counties: Lawrence

Highway system
- Arkansas Highway System; Interstate; US; State; Business; Spurs; Suffixed; Scenic; Heritage
← AR 116	→ AR 118

Arkansas Highway 117 (AR 117, Hwy. 117) is a north–south state highway in Lawrence County, Arkansas. The route of 16.54 miles (26.62 km) runs from a junction of Highway 25 and Highway 230 in Strawberry north across US Route 63/US 412 (US 63/US 412) to 3rd Street in Black Rock.

== Route description ==
The route begins at a junction of Highway 25/Highway 230 in Strawberry and runs north. Highway 117 forms a concurrency with Highway 115 at Jesop until Smithville. The routes pass the National Register of Historic Places-listed Smithville Public School Building before Highway 115 turns north with Highway 117 continuing east. After passing through Denton the route intersects Highway 117S toward Powhatan. The highway curves north to intersect US 63/US 412 in Black Rock, forming a concurrency east.

== Major intersections ==
Mile markers reset at concurrencies. The entire route is in Lawrence County.

Location	mi	km	Destinations	Notes
Strawberry	0.00	0.00	AR 25 (Main Street) / AR 230 west (River Drive) – Lynn, Cave City, Cord	Southern terminus
Jesup	4.21	6.78	AR 115 south – Cave City	
AR 115 concurrency north, 4.9 miles (7.9 km)
Smithville	0.00	0.00	AR 115 north (Main Street) – Imboden	
	9.96	16.03	AR 117S	
Black Rock	10.96	17.64	US 63 north / US 412 west – Hardy	
Black Rock	US 63 / US 412 concurrency east, 1.1 miles (1.8 km)			
Black Rock	0.00	0.00	US 63 south / US 412 east – Hoxie	
Black Rock	1.11	1.79	AR 361 east – Davidsonville Historic State Park	
Black Rock	1.37	2.20	AR 25 to US 63 / US 412 – Lynn, Strawberry	Northern terminus
1.000 mi = 1.609 km; 1.000 km = 0.621 mi

== Powhatan spur ==
Highway 117S
- Location: Powhatan
- Length: 1.26 mi (2.03 km)

Arkansas Highway 117 Spur (AR 117S, Hwy. 117S) is a 1.26-mile (2.03 km) spur route. The route begins at Highway 117 and runs southeast to Powhatan. Several properties on the National Register of Historic Places are contained in Powhatan and the adjacent Powhatan Courthouse State Park including the Powhatan Courthouse.

Major intersections

The entire route is in Lawrence County.

Location	mi	km	Destinations	Notes
	0.00	0.00	AR 117	
Powhatan	1.26	2.03	AR 25 – Black Rock, Strawberry	
1.000 mi = 1.609 km; 1.000 km = 0.621 mi
