= Powhatan Methodist Church =

Historic church in Arkansas, United States

- U.S. National Register of Historic Places
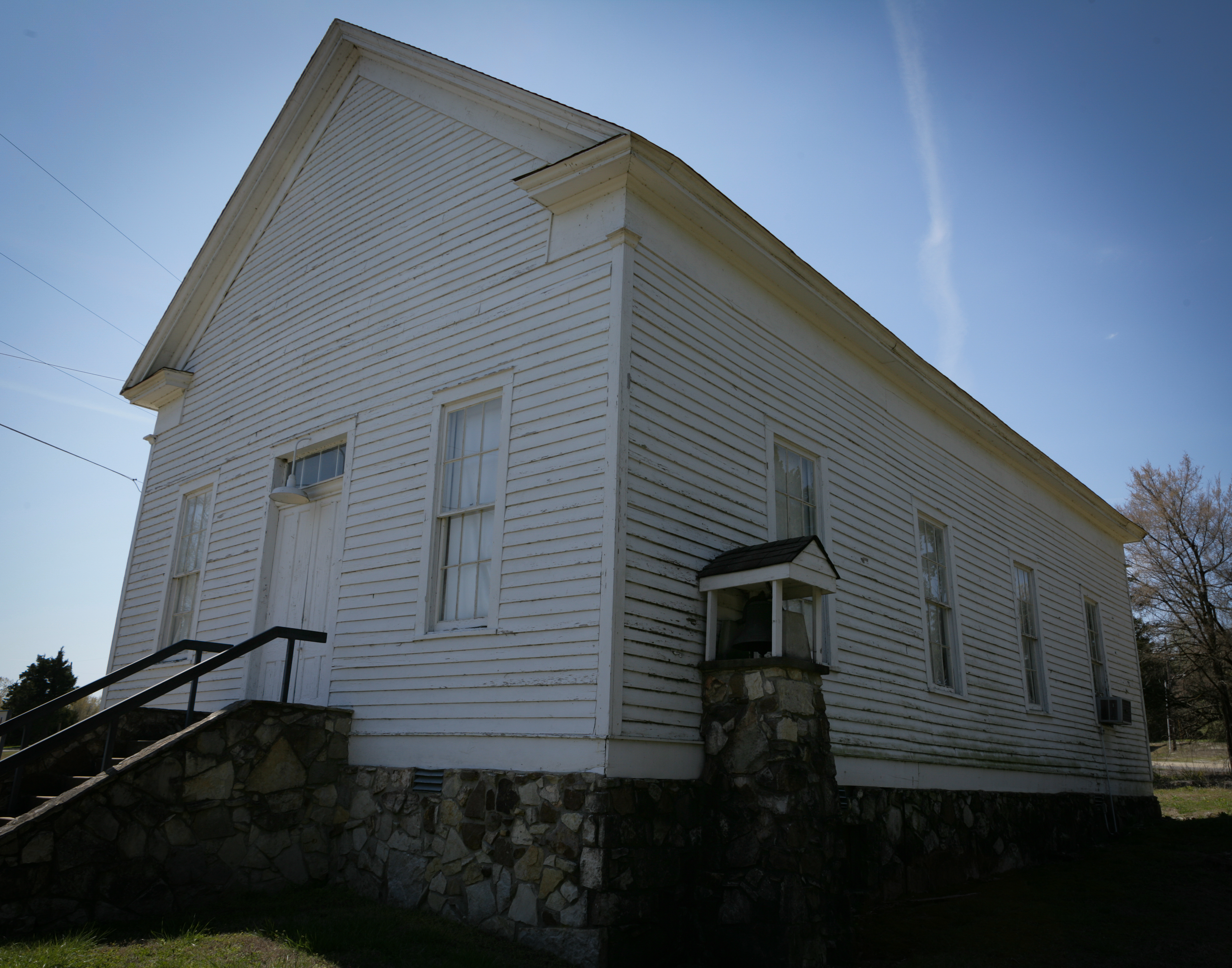

- Location within Arkansas Location within the United States
- Location: AR 25, Powhatan, Arkansas
- Coordinates: 36°4′55″N 91°7′12″W
- Area: less than one acre
- Built: 1872
- NRHP reference No.: 77000260
- Added to NRHP: November 23, 1977

The Powhatan Methodist Church is a historic church on Arkansas Highway 25 in Powhatan, Arkansas. It is a single-story wood-frame structure with a gable roof and a stone foundation. The main (only) entrance is in the east facade, and consists of a double door topped by a transom window. Flanking bays are filled with sash windows, identical to those found on the other facades. The interior has retained a number of original furnishings, including its pews and a pump organ. The church was built in 1872, probably replacing an earlier log structure used by its congregation, which was founded in 1854.

The church was listed on the National Register of Historic Places in 1977.

== See also ==
- National Register of Historic Places listings in Lawrence County, Arkansas
