= Portia School =

- U.S. National Register of Historic Places
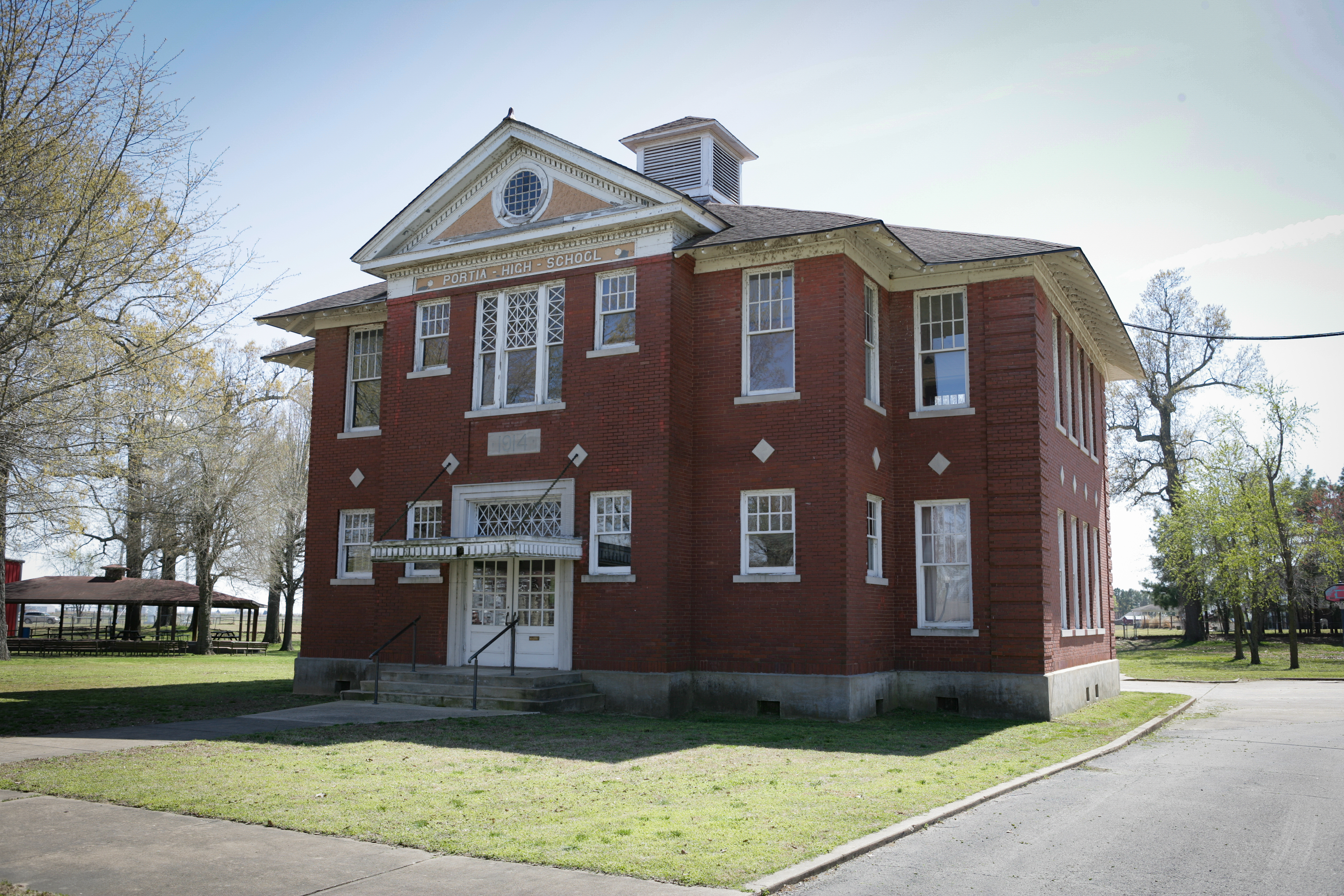

- Location within Arkansas Location within the United States
- Location: City Park, Portia, Arkansas
- Coordinates: 36°5′5″N 91°4′15″W
- Area: less than one acre
- Built: 1914
- NRHP reference No.: 78000604
- Added to NRHP: December 13, 1978

The Portia School is a historic school building at City Park in Portia, Arkansas. The two-story red brick structure was built in 1914, and was the small town's only school until 1948. It is by far the most architecturally significant early 20th-century building in the community. The building is five bays wide, with each pair of bays flanking the central one stepped back, giving it a rough cross shape. The entrance is housed in the central bay, with a gabled pediment at the roof line. The main roof is hipped, with brackets in the eaves and a cupola at the center.

The building was listed on the National Register of Historic Places.

== See also ==
- National Register of Historic Places listings in Lawrence County, Arkansas
