= Home Economics–F.F.A. Building =

- Home Economics–F. F. A. Building
- U.S. National Register of Historic Places
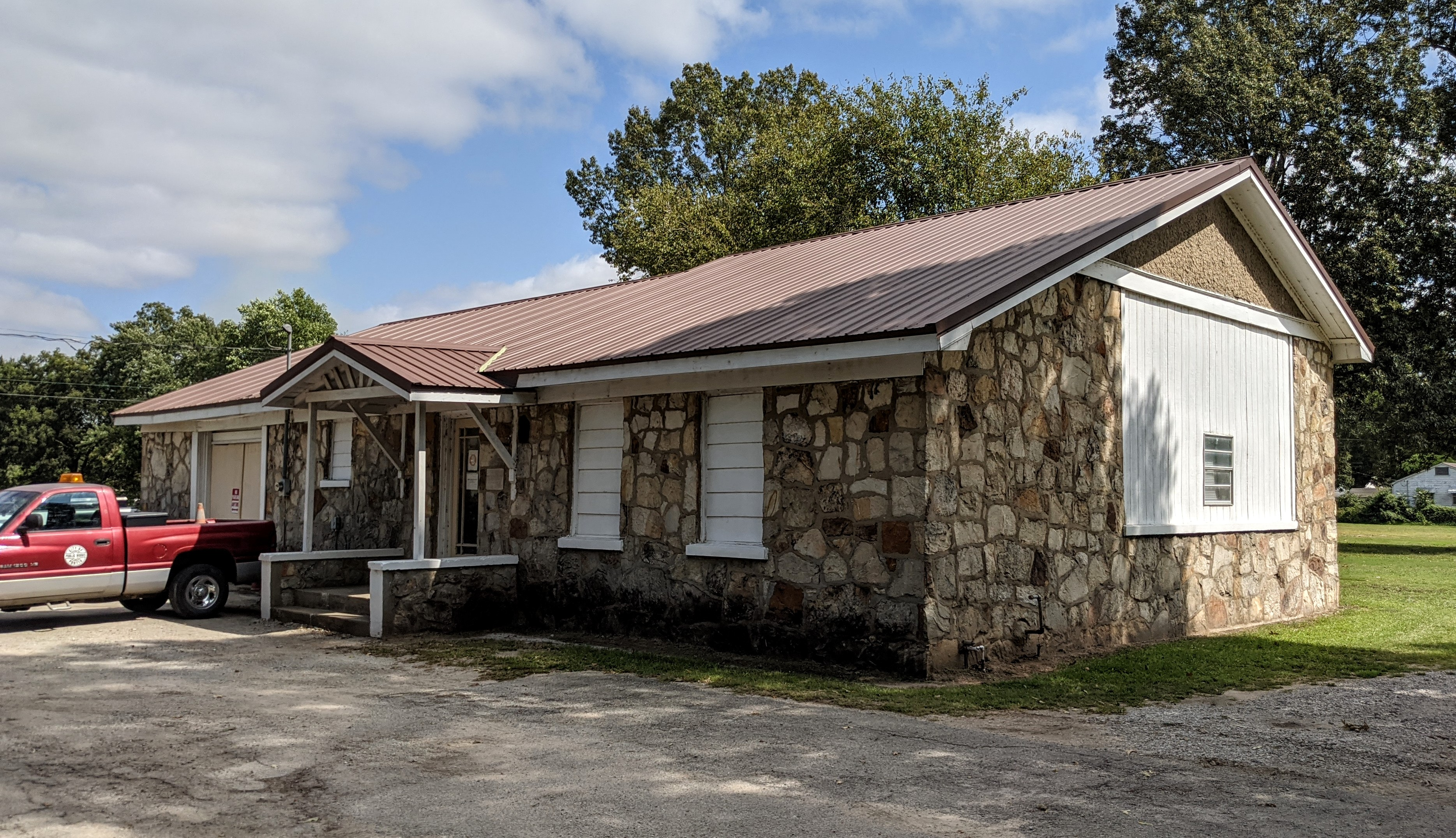
- Home Economics - F.F.A. Building

- Location within Arkansas Location within the United States
- Location: City Park Drvive; Portia, Arkansas
- Coordinates: 36°5′6″N 91°4′11″W
- Area: less than one acre
- Built by: National Youth Administration
- Architectural style: Late 19th And Early 20th Century American Movements, Rustic
- NRHP reference No.: 90000901
- Added to NRHP: June 14, 1990

The Home Economics–F.F.A. Building is a historic school building on City Park Drive in Portia, Arkansas. It is a single-story sandstone structure with a gable roof. Its entrance is sheltered by a gable-roofed bracketed portico over a concrete stoop, and its roof has typical Craftsman features. It was built in 1937-38 by a crew from the National Youth Administration with funding from the Works Progress Administration, and served for many years as a school building and social venue.

The building was listed on the National Register of Historic Places in 1990.

== See also ==
- National Register of Historic Places listings in Lawrence County, Arkansas
