= Inboden =

Inboden is a surname. Notable people with the surname include:

- Mary Hollis Inboden (born 1986), American actress and writer
- William Inboden (born 1972), American academic, writer, and former White House staffer

== See also ==
- Imboden (surname)
