= Walnut Ridge Commercial Historic District =

Historic district in Arkansas, United States

- U.S. National Register of Historic Places
- U.S. Historic district
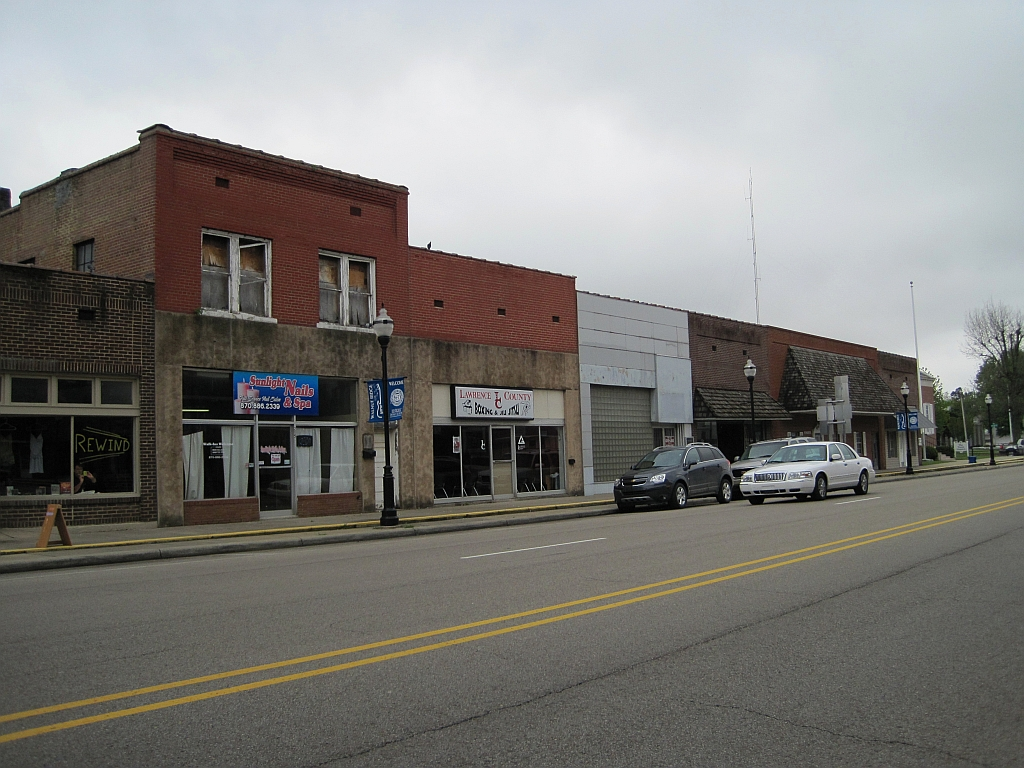

- Location within Arkansas Location within the United States
- Location: Roughly bounded by E and W Main, N and S Front Sts, W Vine, and SW Third Sts, Walnut Ridge, Arkansas
- Coordinates: 36.06878°N 90.95734°W
- Area: 20 acres (8.1 ha)
- Built: 1875
- Architect: Simon, Louis A.
- Architectural style: Late 19th And Early 20th Century American Movements, Late 19th And 20th Century Revivals
- NRHP reference No.: 10000286
- Added to NRHP: May 28, 2010

The Walnut Ridge Commercial Historic District encompasses the historic town center of Walnut Ridge, Arkansas, the county seat of Lawrence County. The district includes a four-block stretch of Main Street (United States Route 412) on the northwest side of the railroad tracks, and extends for one and sometimes two blocks on either side. Walnut Ridge was founded as a railroad town in 1875, and soon became a leading economic center in the county. Most of its historic downtown consists of vernacular commercial architecture dating to the late 19th and early 20th centuries, built of masonry and brick, and one or two stories in height. Notable buildings include the 1924 Swan Theatre at 222 West Main Street, the 1935 Old Walnut Ridge Post Office at 225 West Main (now housing the Times Dispatch), and the 1965 Lawrence County Courthouse at 315 West Main, which replaced a c. 1900 structure.

The district was listed on the National Register of Historic Places in 2010.

== See also ==
- National Register of Historic Places listings in Lawrence County, Arkansas
