= Smithville Public School Building =

- U.S. National Register of Historic Places
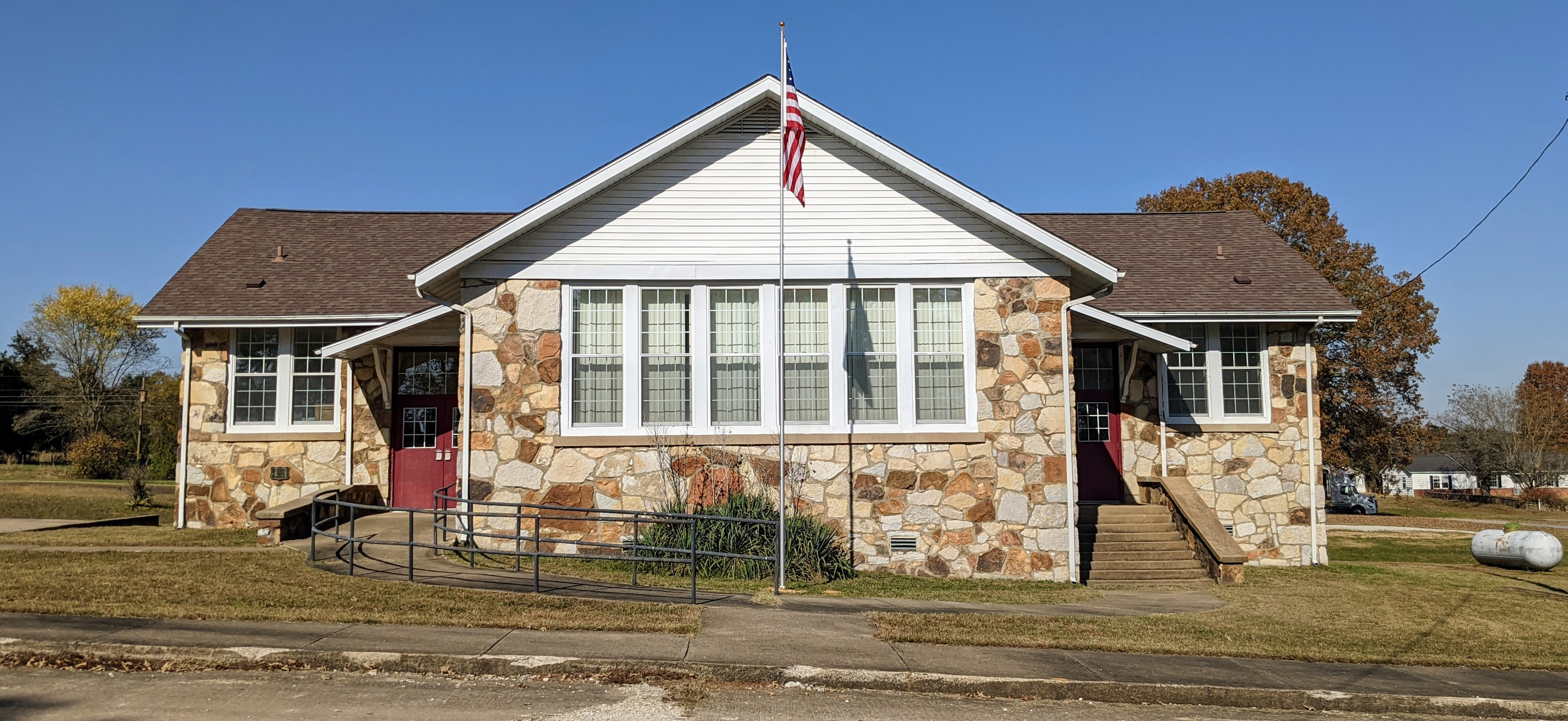

- Location within Arkansas Location within the United States
- Location: AR 117, Smithville, Arkansas
- Coordinates: 36°4′48″N 91°18′20″W
- Area: 2 acres (0.81 ha)
- Built by: Works Progress Administration
- Architectural style: Bungalow/American craftsman, Plain Traditional
- MPS: Public Schools in the Ozarks MPS
- NRHP reference No.: 92001219
- Added to NRHP: January 14, 1993

The Smithville Public School Building is a historic school building on Arkansas Highway 117 in the small community of Smithville, Arkansas. It is a single-story T-shaped fieldstone structure with a cross-gable roof.

== History ==
It was built in 1936 with funding from the Works Progress Administration in an attempt to bolster the community's economy, which had been affected by the Great Depression, and by the loss of its status as county seat when Sharp County was separated from Lawrence County.

In the 1980s, the building was in poor condition, so state legislators distributed 140,000 dollars to repair the building.

The building was listed on the National Register of Historic Places on January 11, 1993. It now functions as a fire station.

== See also ==
- National Register of Historic Places listings in Lawrence County, Arkansas
