= Bethel Cemetery (Denton, Arkansas) =

Historic cemetery in Arkansas, United States

- U.S. National Register of Historic Places
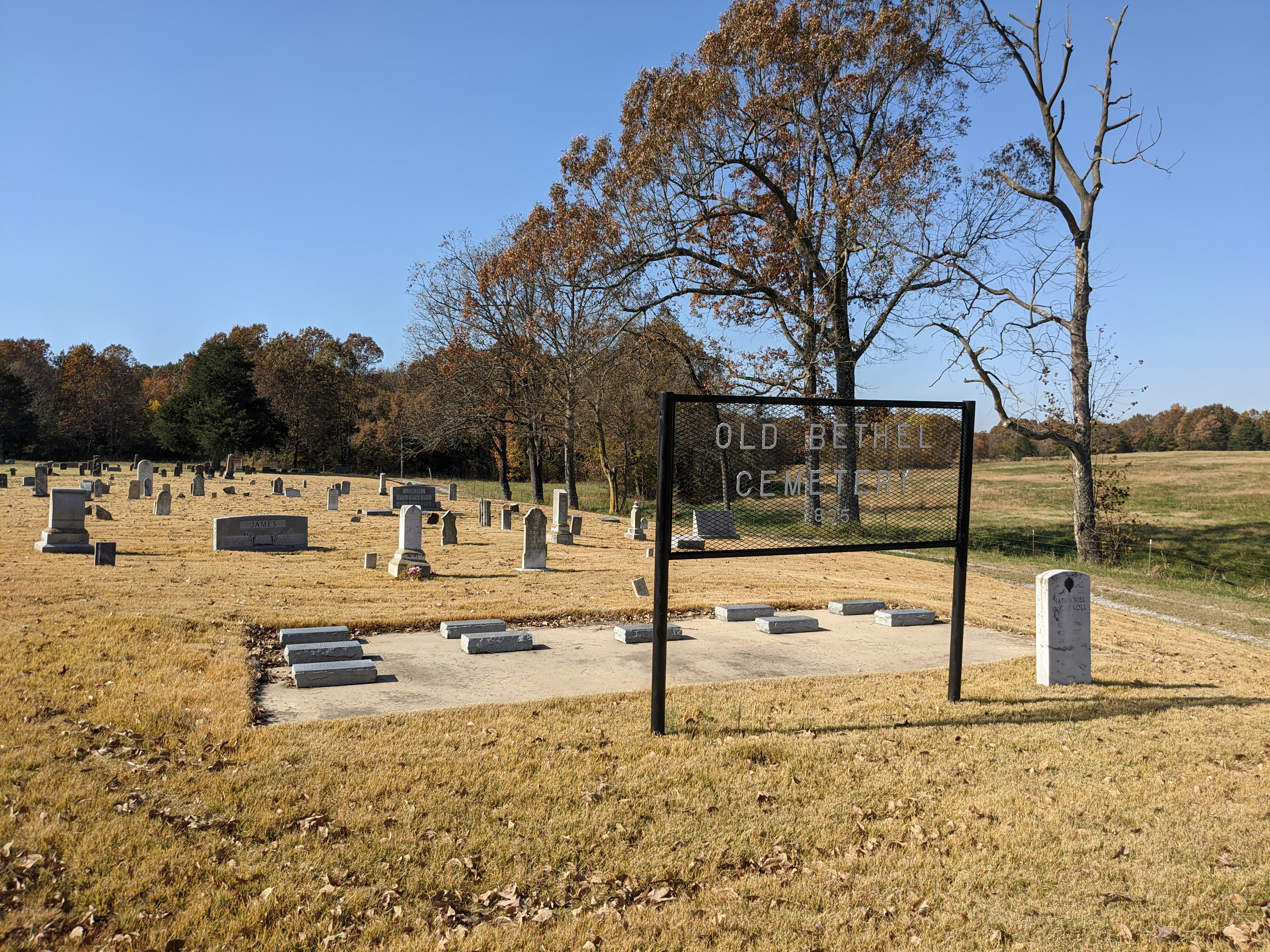
- Bethel Cemetery

- Location within Arkansas Location within the United States
- Location: 1.1 miles (1.8 km) north of AR 117 on County Rd. 225, near Denton, Arkansas
- Coordinates: 36°6′6″N 91°14′5″W
- Area: 4.5 acres (1.8 ha)
- NRHP reference No.: 11000354,
- Added to NRHP: June 15, 2011

Bethel Cemetery is a cemetery in rural western Lawrence County, Arkansas. It is located off County Road 225, about 1.1 miles (1.8 km) north of Arkansas Highway 117, roughly midway between Black Rock and Smithville. Its oldest portion occupies a roughly triangular parcel of land, surrounded by a perimeter road, with a gate at the eastern corner. It is located next to the site of a church which was established in the 1820s, and its oldest grave is supposedly the 1835 burial of an American Revolutionary War veteran. The oldest dated grave marker is marked 1858, and the cemetery continues to be used today. The cemetery is a reminder of the community of Denton, which flourished in the mid-19th century, but declined after it was bypassed by the railroad.

The cemetery was listed on the National Register of Historic Places in 1999.

== See also ==
- National Register of Historic Places listings in Lawrence County, Arkansas
