= Dr. F.W. Buercklin House =

Historic house in Arkansas, United States

- U.S. National Register of Historic Places
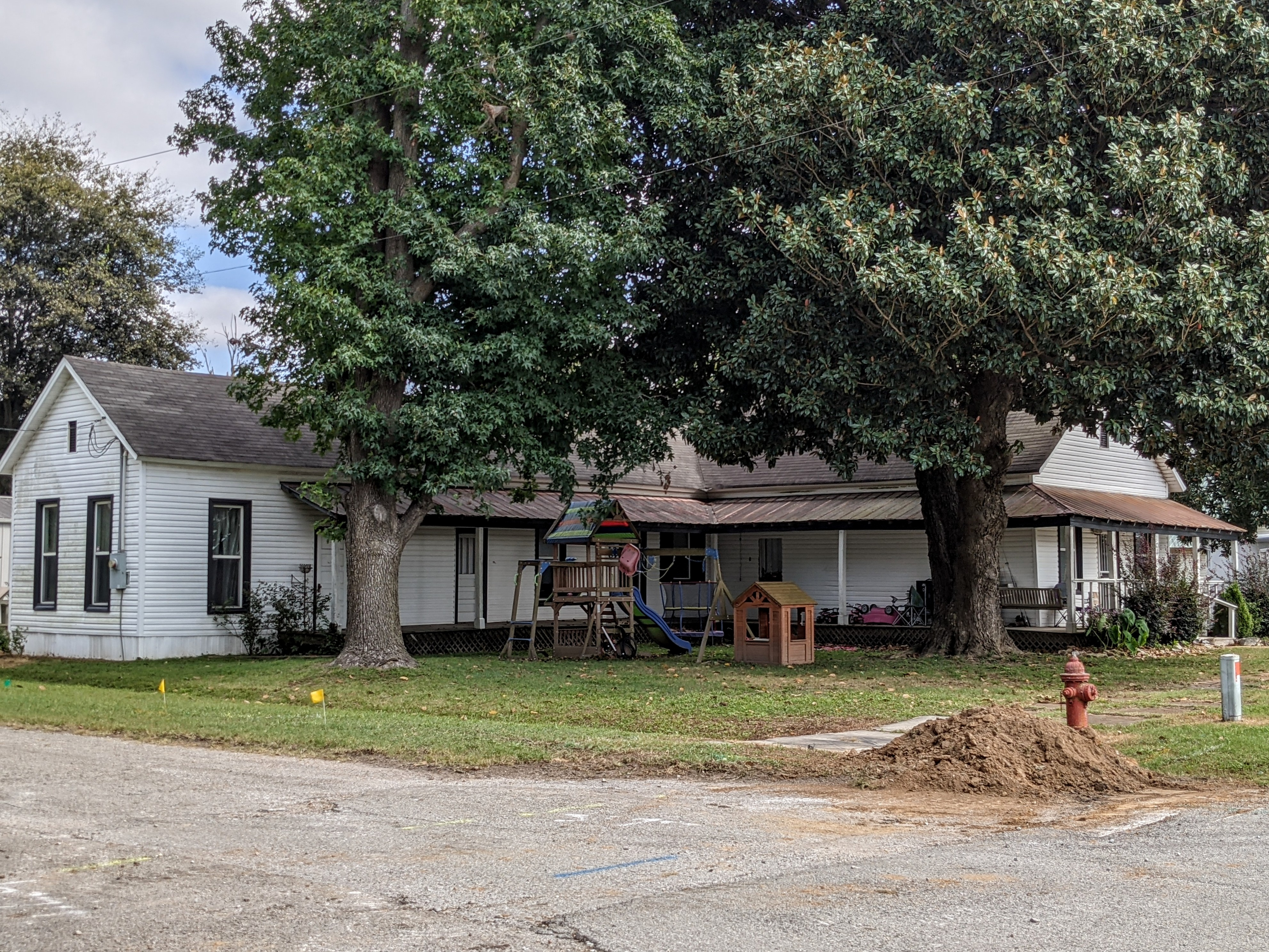
- Dr. F.W. Buercklin House

- Location within Arkansas Location within the United States
- Location: 104 Main Street; Portia, Arkansas
- Coordinates: 35°11′12″N 91°5′21″W
- Area: less than one acre
- Built: 1880
- NRHP reference No.: 98000882
- Added to NRHP: July 24, 1998

The Dr. F.W. Buercklin House is a historic house at 104 Main Street in Portia, Arkansas. It is an L-shaped single-story Plain-Traditional frame and log structure whose initial construction is estimated to be 1880. It is believed to be the oldest standing structure in the community and has served variously as a doctor's office, residence, and general store. Its oldest portion is thought to be a four-pen log dogtrot, which has since been augmented by a fifth pen and frame additions. It was home to the Buercklin family for most of the 20th century and is a rare survivor of a 1906 fire that destroyed many buildings in Portia.

The house was listed on the National Register of Historic Places in 1998.

== See also ==
- National Register of Historic Places listings in Lawrence County, Arkansas
