= Mount Zion Cemetery (Walnut Ridge, Arkansas) =

Historic cemetery in Arkansas, United States

- U.S. National Register of Historic Places
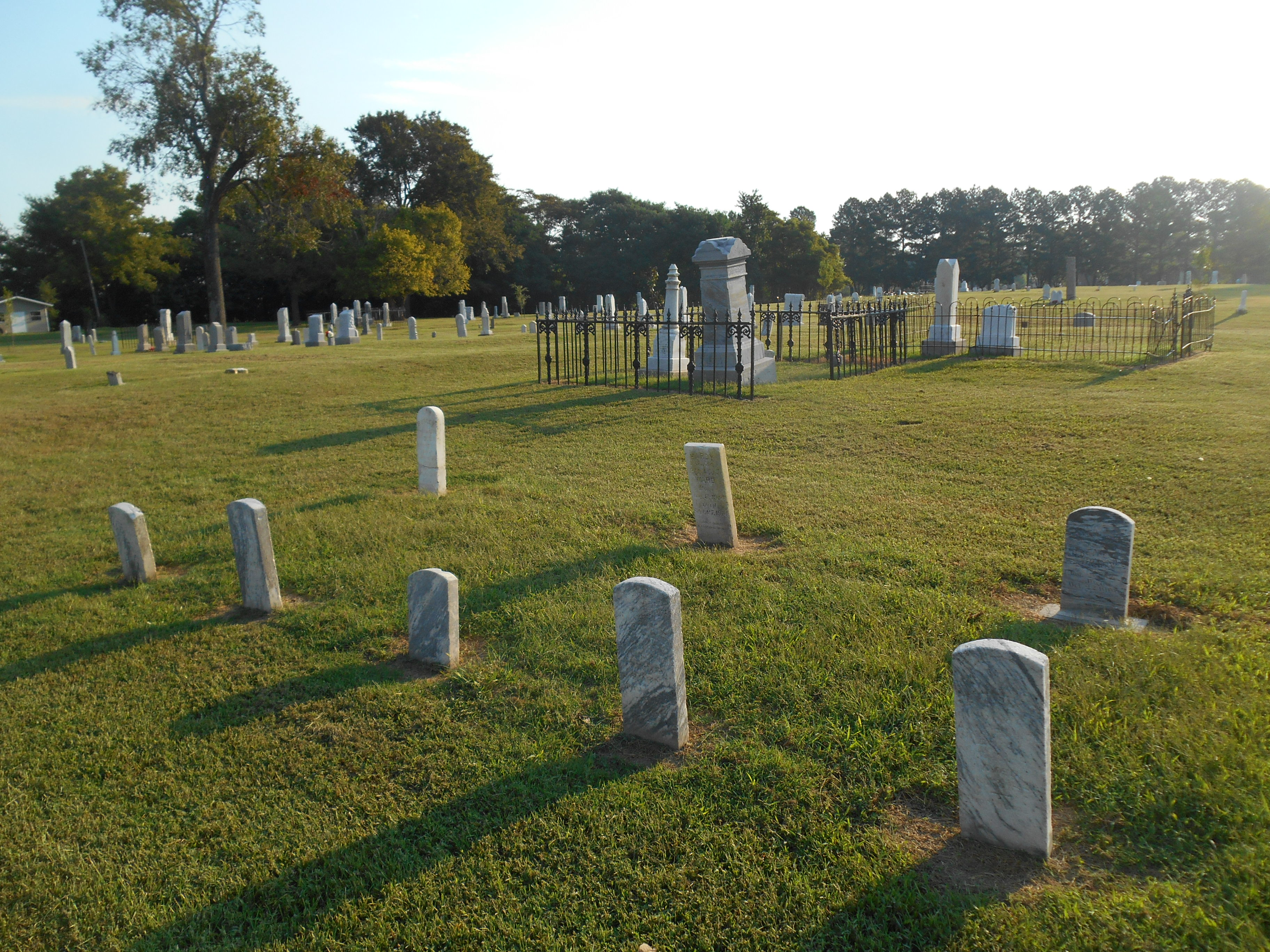
- Mount Zion Cemetery

- Location within Arkansas Location within the United States
- Location: West Fulbright Avenue, near Williams Baptist University
- Coordinates: 36°7′31″N 90°56′35″W
- Area: 2.8 acres (1.1 ha)
- NRHP reference No.: 100006610,
- Added to NRHP: June 1, 2021

Mount Zion Cemetery is a historic cemetery in Walnut Ridge, Arkansas, located north of the junction of Fulbright Avenue and Mills Street near the entrance to Williams Baptist University. The earliest confirmed burial dates to 1875, and approximately 360 burials are known to have occurred in the cemetery since then, with most taking place in the late 1800s and early 1900s. A church and school were once located adjacent to the cemetery, but both are no longer extant. The Walnut Ridge Army Airfield was constructed near the cemetery during World War II. After a cycle of neglect and restoration in the 1970s and 1980s, the cemetery was thereafter maintained by the municipality of College City until College City's 2017 consolidation with Walnut Ridge.

The cemetery was listed on the National Register of Historic Places in 2021.

== See also ==
- National Register of Historic Places listings in Lawrence County, Arkansas
