= Clover Bend High School =

- U.S. National Register of Historic Places
- U.S. Historic district – Contributing property
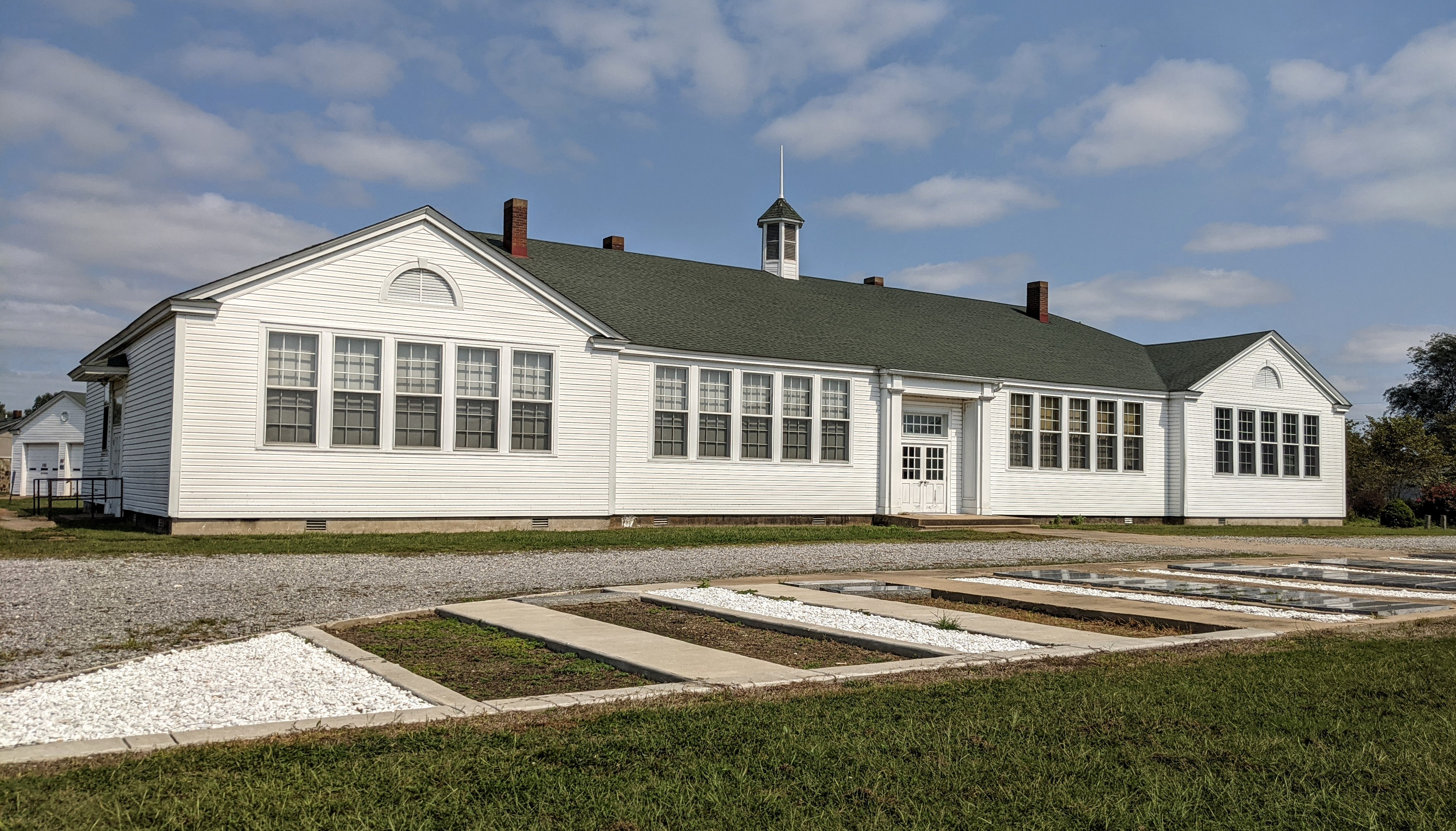
- Clover Bend High School

- Location within Arkansas Location within the United States
- Location: AR 228, Clover Bend, Arkansas
- Coordinates: 35°59′7″N 91°5′15″W
- Area: less than one acre
- Built: 1937
- Built by: Buford Bracy,
- Part of: Clover Bend Historic District (ID90001368)
- NRHP reference No.: 83001159

Significant dates
- Added to NRHP: August 17, 1983
- Designated CP: September 17, 1990

The Clover Bend High School is a historic community building on Arkansas Highway 228 in Clover Bend, Arkansas. It is a single-story wood-frame structure, with a main central hip-roofed block, symmetrical side wings with gable roofs, and a rear projecting auditorium section. It was built in 1937–38 with funding from the Farm Security Administration, with a number of additional buildings added to the complex in later years, including a gymnasium, elementary school, and administrator housing. This complex formed the core of a major rural resettlement project, which included more than 90 farms.

The building was listed on the National Register of Historic Places in 1983.

== See also ==
- National Register of Historic Places listings in Lawrence County, Arkansas
