= Walnut Ridge Army Airfield Access Road =

United States historic place in Arkansas

- U.S. National Register of Historic Places
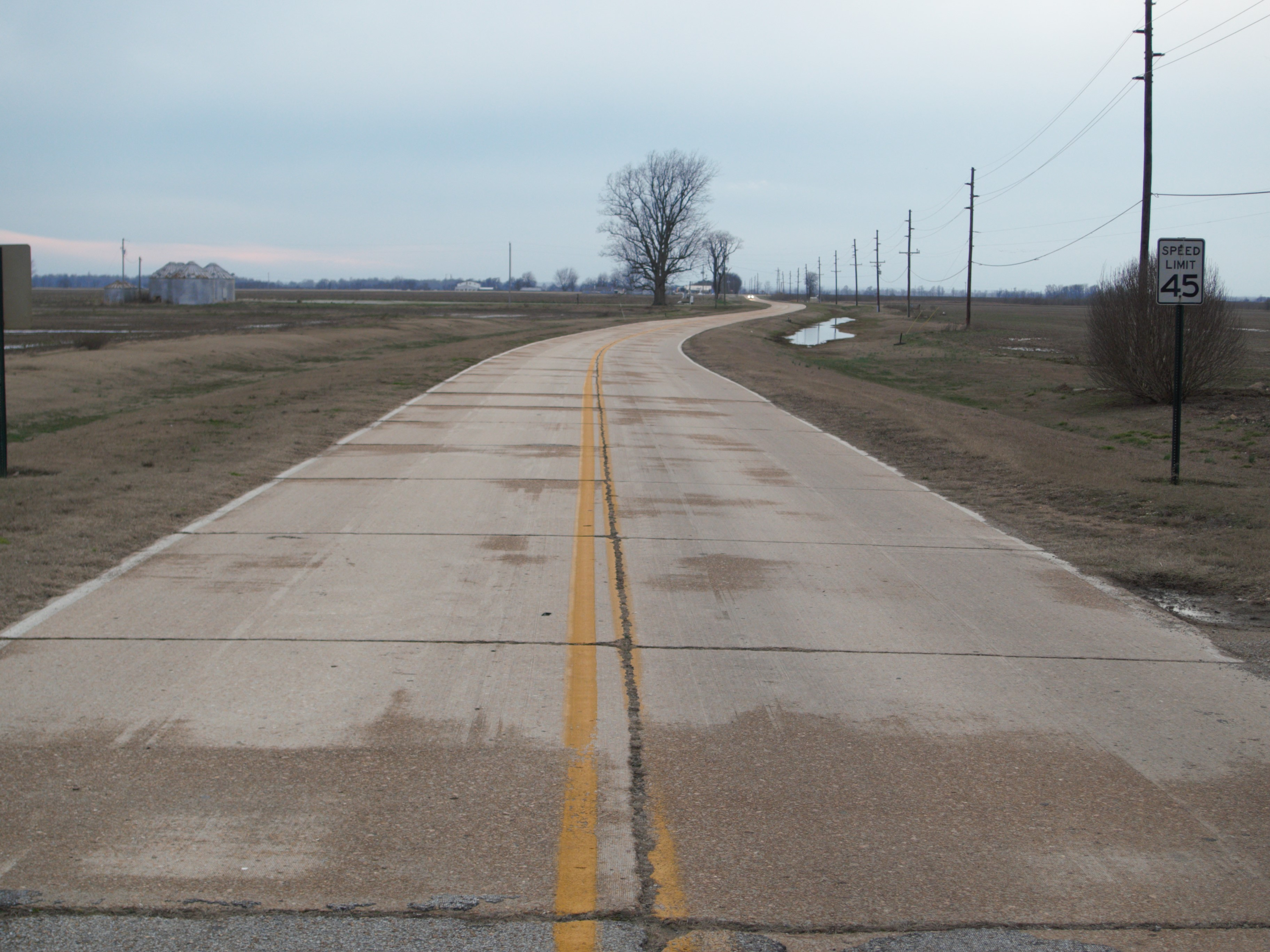

- Location within Arkansas Location within the United States
- Location: Fulbright Avenue between US 67 and Stafford Lane, Walnut Ridge, Arkansas
- Coordinates: 36°7′32″N 90°56′59″W
- Area: 3.6 acres (1.5 ha)
- Built: 1943
- NRHP reference No.: 160000318
- Added to NRHP: June 7, 2016

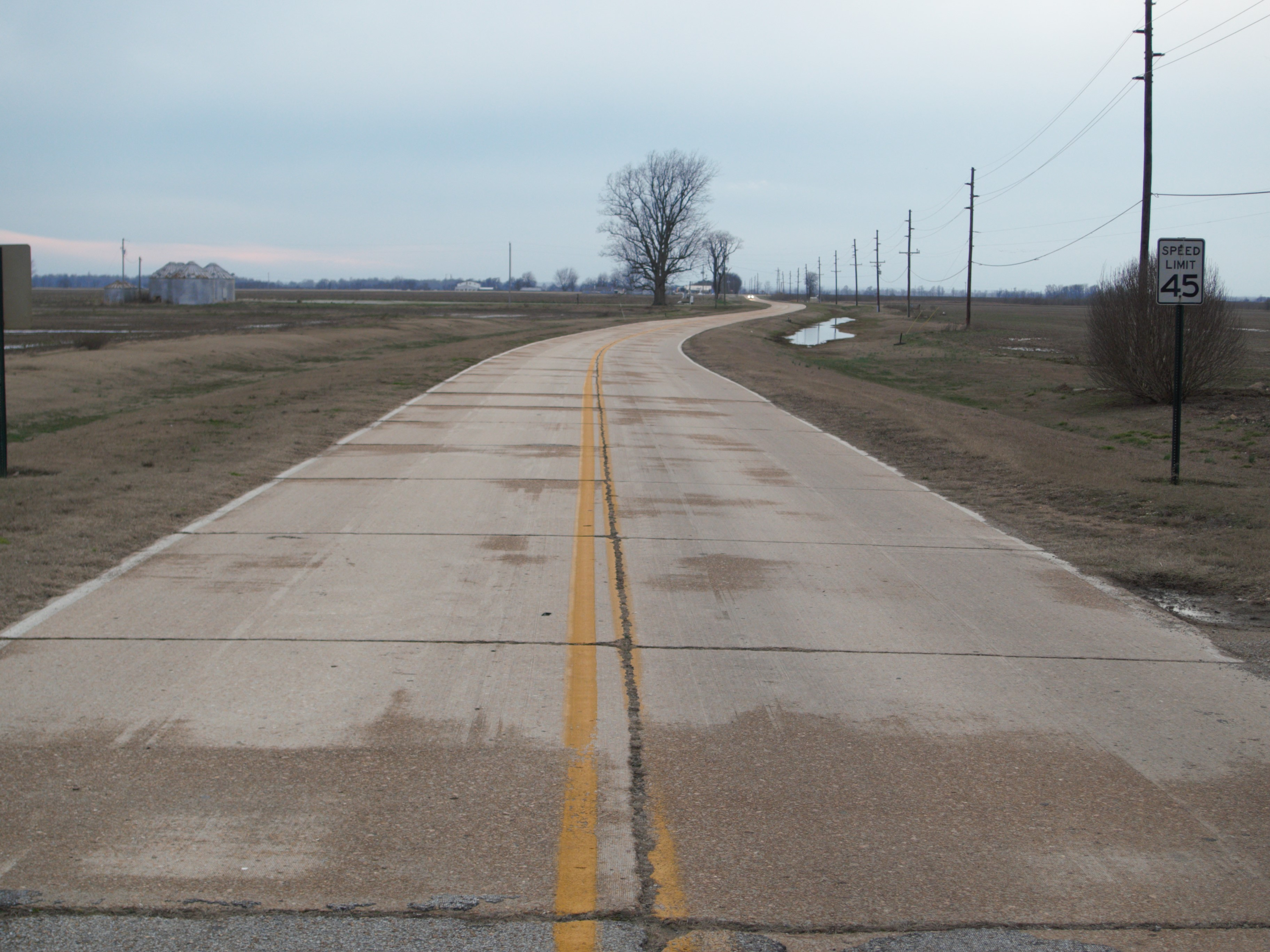

The Walnut Ridge Army Airfield Access Road is a historic roadway segment near College City, Arkansas. It consists of about 0.75 miles (1.21 km) of Fulbright Avenue, extending east from its junction with the U.S. Highway 67 (US 67) to Stafford Lane. It has a largely original concrete surface 20 feet (6.1 m), with gravel shoulders. It also passes over two period culverts. The roadway is part of the original main access road to the Walnut Ridge Army Airfield, and was built in 1942–43, when the field was in active use during World War II. It is a well-preserved example of the period road building.

The roadway section was listed on the National Register of Historic Places in 2016.

== See also ==
- National Register of Historic Places listings in Lawrence County, Arkansas
