= Building Number 29 =

- Building 29
- U.S. National Register of Historic Places
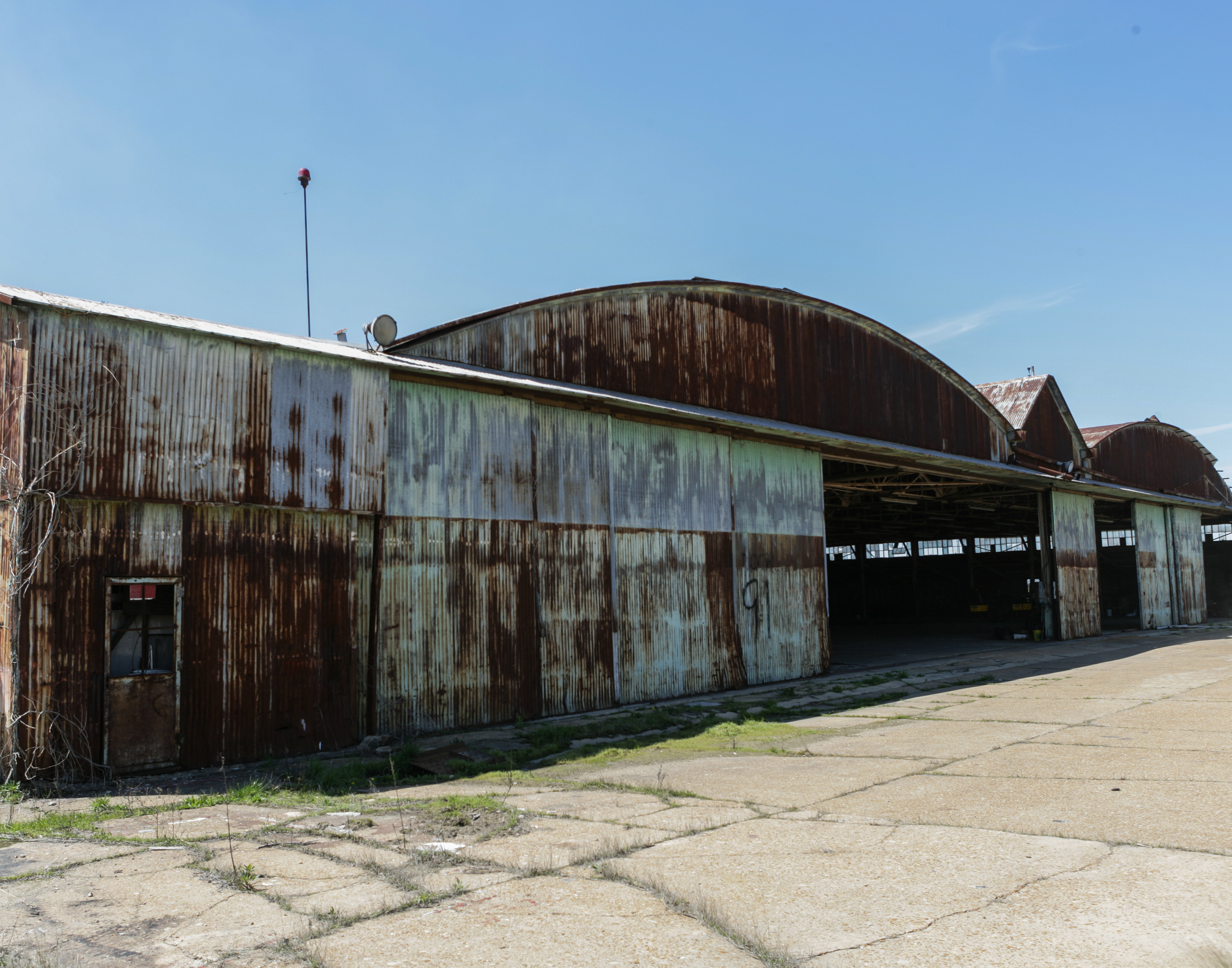

- Location within Arkansas Location within the United States
- Location: 162 N. Beacon Rd., near Walnut Ridge, Arkansas
- Coordinates: 36°7′41″N 90°55′42″W
- Area: Less than one acre
- Built: 1942
- NRHP reference No.: 12000856
- Added to NRHP: October 17, 2012

Building 29 is a historic aircraft hangar at 162 North Beacon Road, on the western edge of Walnut Ridge Regional Airport in Lawrence County, Arkansas. It is a large metal-framed structure, built in 1942 using the standard DH-1 Army plan for such buildings. It was part of the national home defense efforts of World War II. It is one of a small number of such buildings left in the state, and the only one surviving virtually unaltered of four built at Walnut Ridge, which was used as a military airfield 1941–46. The rear of the building (which faces the street) has had a small brick office cell attached.

The building was listed on the National Register of Historic Places in 2012.

== See also ==
- National Register of Historic Places listings in Lawrence County, Arkansas
