= US 63 Black River Bridge =

- Formerly listed on the U.S. National Register of Historic Places
- Location within Arkansas Location within the United States
- Location: US 63, Black Rock, Arkansas
- Coordinates: 36°5′52″N 91°5′32″W
- Area: 6 acres (2.4 ha)
- Built: 1949
- Built by: Maxwell Construction Co.; et.al.
- Architectural style: Warren truss bridge
- MPS: Historic Bridges of Arkansas MPS
- NRHP reference No.: 00000631

Significant dates
- Added to NRHP: June 9, 2000
- Removed from NRHP: January 24, 2017

The US 63 Black River Bridge was a historic bridge, carrying U.S. Route 63 across the Black River at the town of Black Rock, Arkansas. It was a multi-span structure with a total length of 2,608 feet (795 m), a roadway width of 26 feet (7.9 m), and a total width of 32.3 feet (9.8 m). The main section of the bridge was a twelve-span steel Warren truss with open spandrel arches and vertical supports; there were also 23 approach spans. The bridge was built in 1949, and was listed on the National Register of Historic Places in 2000. It has been deemed structurally obsolete by the Arkansas Highway Department, and was demolished in 2015. It was delisted from the National Register in 2017.

== See also ==
- List of bridges on the National Register of Historic Places in Arkansas
- National Register of Historic Places listings in Lawrence County, Arkansas
