= Scott Cemetery (Walnut Ridge, Arkansas) =

Historic cemetery in Arkansas, United States

- U.S. National Register of Historic Places
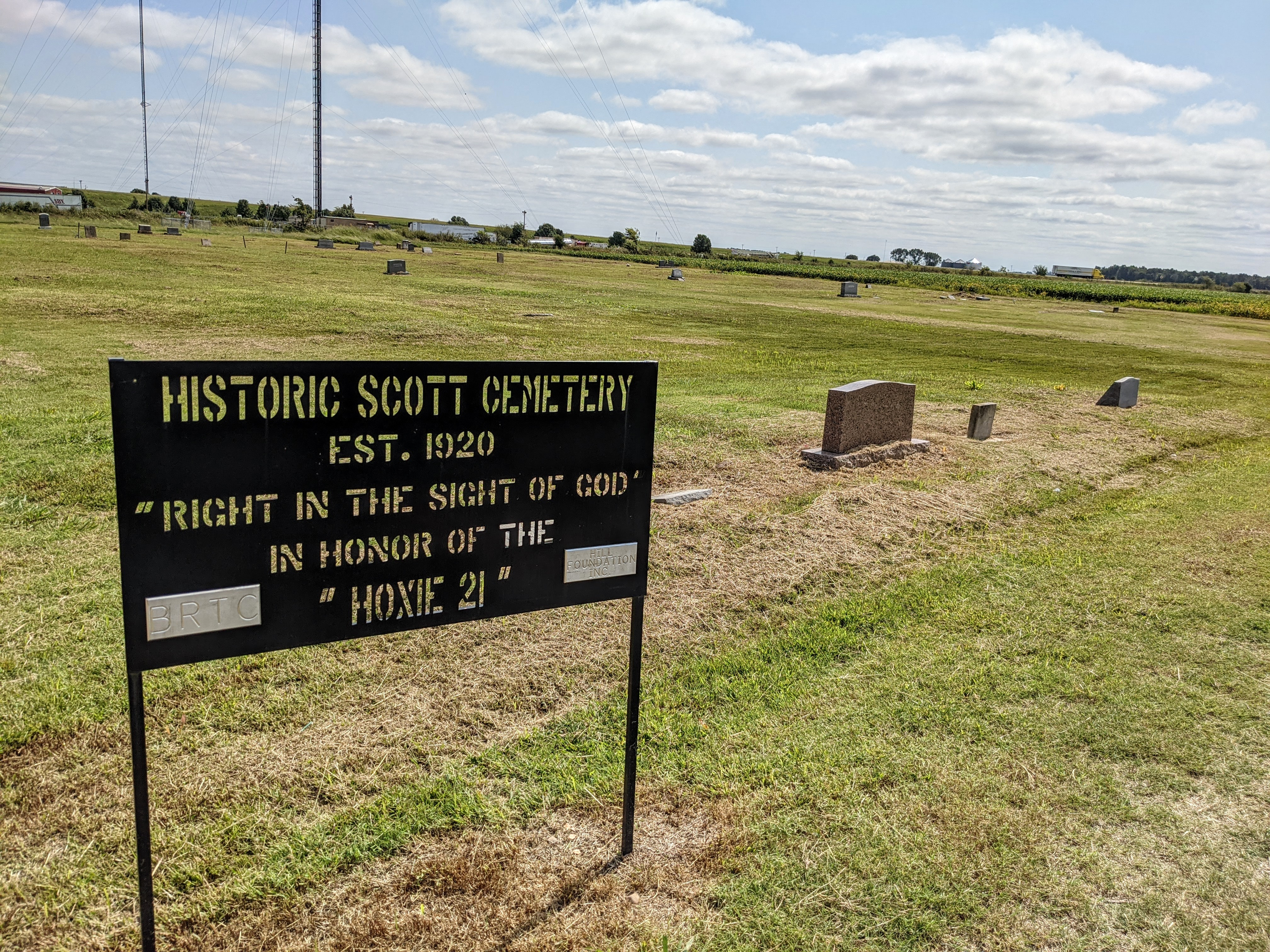
- Scott Cemetery (Walnut Ridge, Arkansas)

- Location within Arkansas Location within the United States
- Location: 0.5 miles (0.80 km) S. of the jct. of US 412 & AR 91, Walnut Ridge, Arkansas
- Coordinates: 36°3′33″N 90°56′41″W
- Area: 1.5 acres (0.61 ha)
- NRHP reference No.: 100001009
- Added to NRHP: June 5, 2017

Scott Cemetery is a historic cemetery on Arkansas Highway 91 in southeastern Walnut Ridge, Arkansas. It is a 1.5-acre (0.61 ha) parcel roughly rectangular in shape. There are an estimated 101 burials in the cemetery, although only 30 are marked with burial markers. The oldest marked burial dates to the 1910s. It was established as a burying ground by local African-Americans during the Jim Crow era and includes at least eight graves of known former slaves.

The cemetery was listed on the National Register of Historic Places in 2017.

== See also ==
- National Register of Historic Places listings in Lawrence County, Arkansas
