= Clover Bend Historic District =

Historic district in Arkansas, US

- U.S. National Register of Historic Places
- U.S. Historic district
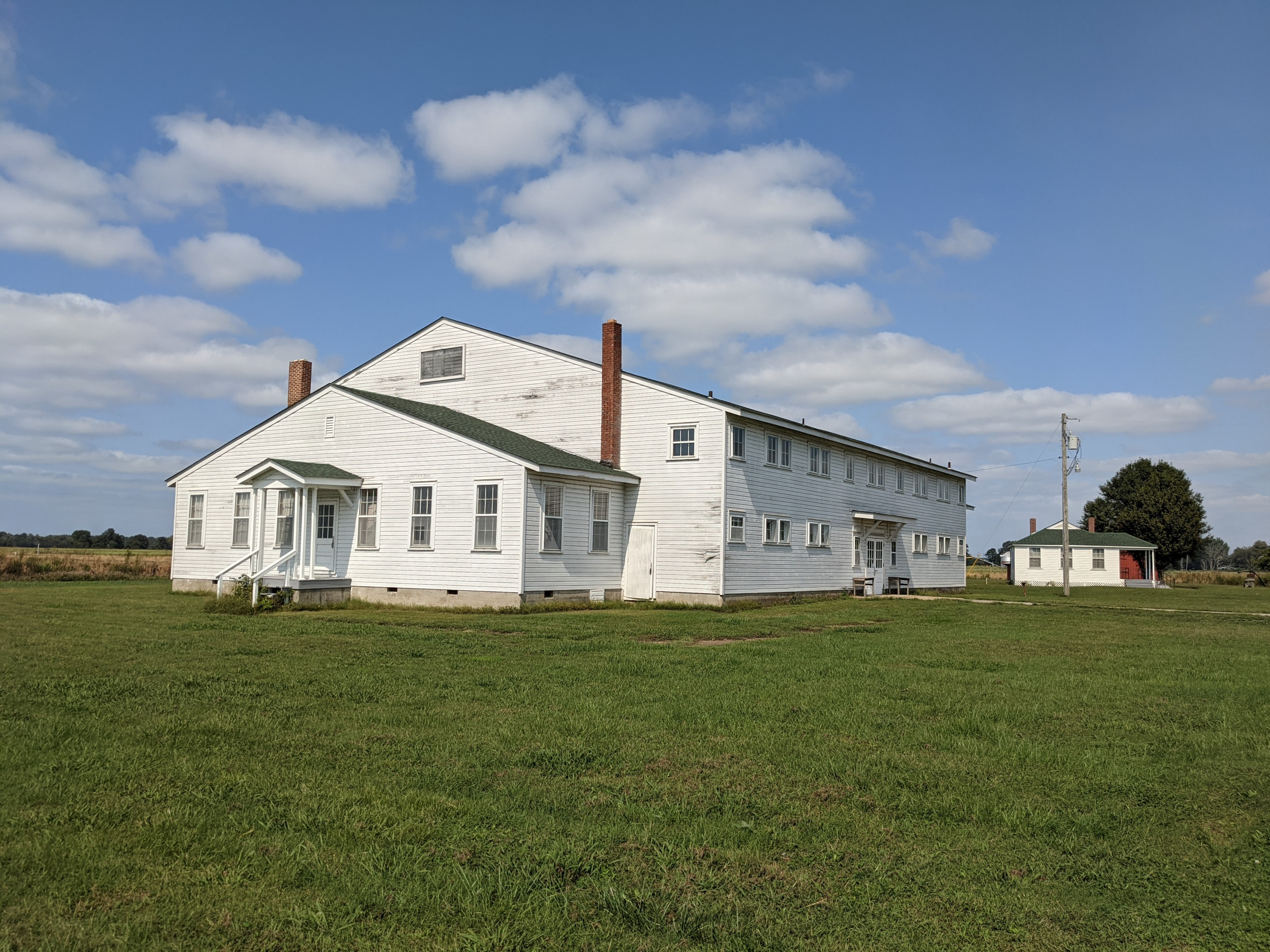

- Location within Arkansas Location within the United States
- Location: Jct. of AR 228 and Co. Rd. 1220, Clover Bend, Arkansas
- Area: less than one acre
- Built: 1937
- Architect: Farm Security Administration
- Architectural style: Plain/Traditional
- NRHP reference No.: 90001368
- Added to NRHP: September 17, 1990

The Clover Bend Historic District encompasses a collection of historic municipal buildings in Clover Bend, Arkansas. It consists of five buildings, centered on the Clover Bend High School, built in 1937 with funding from the Farm Security Administration (FSA). The complex also includes four other primarily academic buildings: the gymnasium, home economics building, cafeteria, and fire station. It was the centerpiece of a major FSA project to provide services and lifelines to the small-scale farmers of the area during the Great Depression.

The district was listed on the National Register of Historic Places in 1990.

== See also ==
- National Register of Historic Places listings in Lawrence County, Arkansas
