= Commandant's House (Walnut Ridge, Arkansas) =

Historic house in Arkansas, United States

- U.S. National Register of Historic Places
- Location within Arkansas Location within the United States
- Location: 264 McClellan Dr., Walnut Ridge, Arkansas
- Coordinates: 36°7′52″N 90°56′17″W
- Area: 4 acres (1.6 ha)
- Built: 1942
- Built by: U.S. Army
- Architectural style: Colonial Revival
- MPS: World War II Home Front Efforts in Arkansas, MPS
- NRHP reference No.: 09001251
- Added to NRHP: January 21, 2010

The Commandant's House is a historic house at 264 McClellan Drive in Walnut Ridge, Arkansas. It is a single story wood-frame structure, with a side-gable main block flanked by front gable wings, giving it a U shape. The house was built in 1942 by the United States Army as the residence of the commander of the Walnut Ridge Army Flying School, and is the only building known to survive from that endeavor. It was also later the home of H.E. Williams, the founder of the nearby Williams Baptist College.

The house was listed on the National Register of Historic Places in 2010.

== See also ==
- National Register of Historic Places listings in Lawrence County, Arkansas
