= U.S. Route 63 =

Highway in the United States

U.S. Route 63
- US 63 highlighted in red

Route information
- Length: 1,286 mi (2,070 km)
- Existed: November 11, 1926–present

Major junctions
- South end: I-20 / US 167 / LA 146 at Ruston, LA
- US 82 / US 167 in El Dorado, AR; I-530 / US 65 / US 79 in Pine Bluff, AR; I-40 from Hazen, AR to Brinkley, AR; US 49 from Brinkley, AR to Jonesboro, AR; I-57 / US 67 / US 412 near Walnut Ridge, AR; I-44 in Rolla, MO; US 50 / US 54 in Jefferson City, MO; I-80 in Malcom, IA; I-90 in Rochester, MN; I-94 in Baldwin, WI
- North end: US 2 west of Ashland, WI

Location
- Country: United States
- States: Louisiana, Arkansas, Missouri, Iowa, Minnesota, Wisconsin

Highway system
- United States Numbered Highway System; List; Special; Divided
- Tennessee State Routes; Interstate; US; State
← US 62	→ US 64
← SR 62	TN	→ SR 63

U.S. Route 63 (US 63) is a 1,286-mile (2,070 km), north–south United States Highway primarily in the Midwestern and Southern United States. The southern terminus of the route is at Interstate 20 (I-20) in Ruston, Louisiana; the northern terminus is at US 2 eight miles (13 km) west of Ashland, Wisconsin.

== Route description ==
=== Louisiana ===
US 63 runs concurrently with US 167 for its entire route in Louisiana, from Ruston north, to Junction City, at the Arkansas state line, a distance of 35 miles (56 km).

=== Arkansas ===
U.S. 63 enters into Arkansas from Louisiana concurrent with US 167 in Junction City. Just a few miles into the state, the two highways run on the eastern edge of El Dorado as an expressway. US 167 splits here, traveling towards Hampton. US 63 bypasses the town of Warren, crossing US 278. US 63 passes through the rural Cleveland County, then enters into Jefferson County.

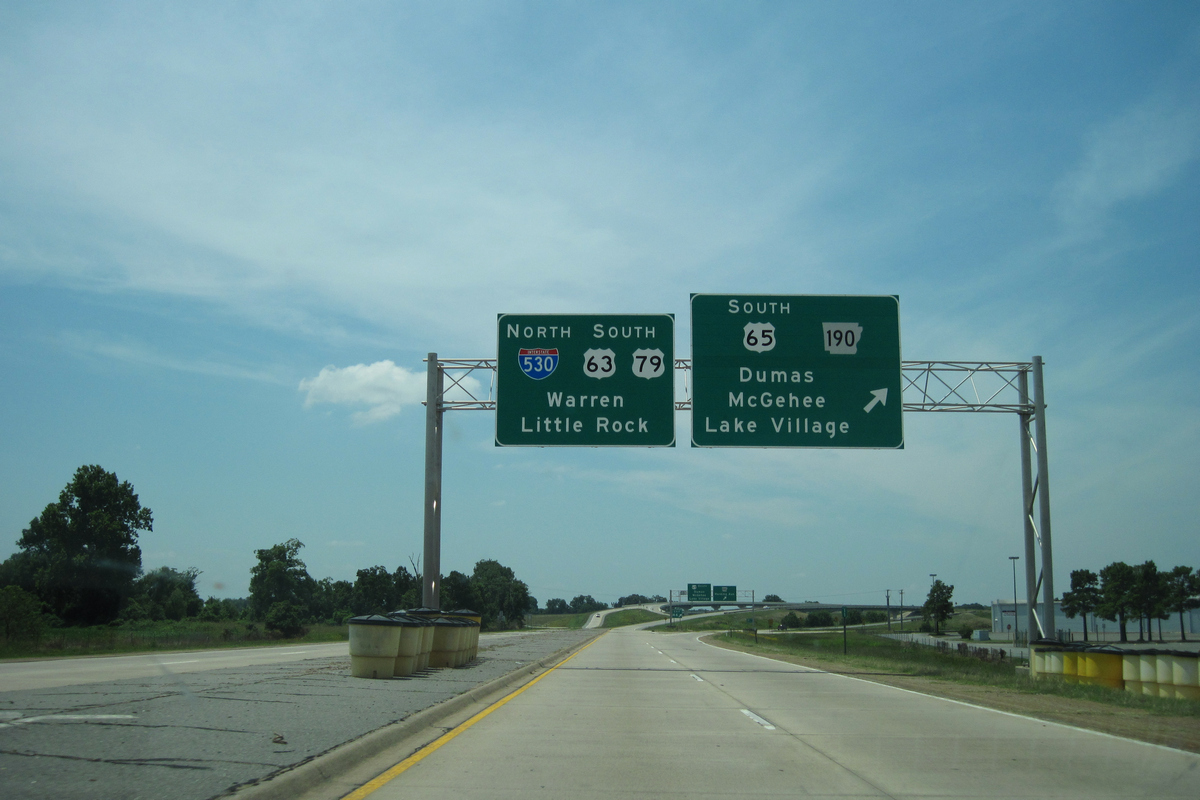
US 63 at the southern terminus of I-530 in Pine Bluff

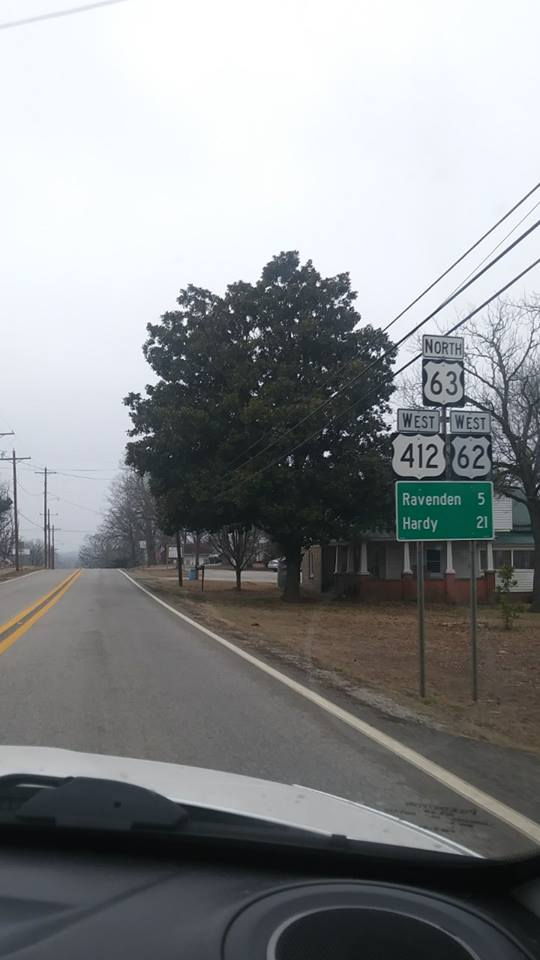
US Highway 62 joins US 63 and 412 in Imboden

In Jefferson County, US 63 serves the city of Pine Bluff. US 63 bypasses the city, running on the last 3 miles of I-530. Also in Pine Bluff, the highway overlaps with US 65 and US 79. US 63 runs northeast with US 79 until Stuttgart, where the highway runs north to Hazen. Just north of Hazen, US 63 overlaps with I-40 to Brinkley. In Brinkley, US 63 begins an overlap with US 49 north to Jonesboro. US 63 leaves US 49 and follows I-555 until I-555 terminates, together serving as a bypass for southern Jonesboro. In Hoxie, US 63 intersects with US 67 (Future I-57). Northwest of here near Portia the highway overlaps with US 412.

In Imboden US 62 joins this overlap. In Hardy, US 63 leaves the two highways. In Mammoth Spring, US 63 crosses into Missouri, traveling to West Plains.

While historically there were many non-concurrencies on US 63, many of those have been resolved. In 2016, US 63 from Jonesboro (including its original US 49 concurrency from Red Wolf Blvd. to Southwest Drive) to Turrell was designated as I-555. As a result, US 63 was rerouted to run concurrently with US 49 from Brinkley to Jonesboro. US 63 then runs concurrently with I-555 until it ends west of Jonesboro, where it then continues northwest alone to its concurrency with US 412 at Portia, just northwest of Walnut Ridge.

=== Missouri ===
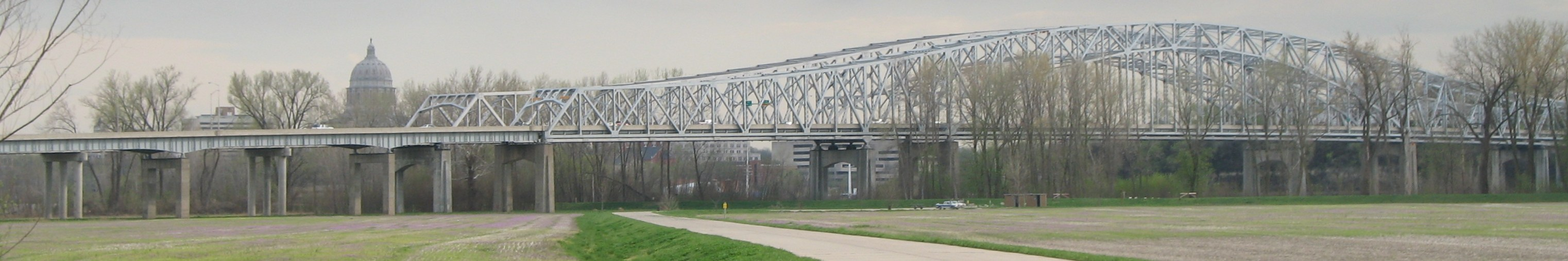
Jefferson City Bridge

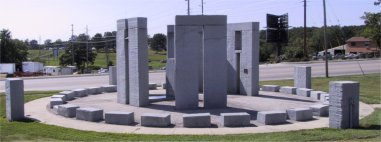
Stonehenge next to US 63

The highway passes south-to-north through Missouri, from Arkansas to Iowa, serving cities such as Rolla, Jefferson City, Columbia, Moberly, Macon, and Kirksville. Notable routes that are intersected include US 60 in Howell County, I-44 at Rolla, US 50 (with which it shares a concurrency into Jefferson City south of the Missouri River until it reaches the junction with US 54), US 54 (which it overlaps in Jefferson City from the junction with US 50 and crosses the Missouri River with on the Jefferson City Bridge), US 24 at Moberly, US 36 at Macon, and US 136 at Lancaster.

US 63 in Missouri was Route 7 from 1922 to 1926.

=== Iowa ===
US 63 passes south-to-north through Iowa. It enters the state from Missouri south of Bloomfield. Between Ottumwa and Oskaloosa, the highway overlaps Iowa Highway 163. This segment is an expressway which connects Des Moines with Burlington, with freeway bypasses of Ottumwa and Eddyville. Near Malcom, US 63 meets I-80. Only a few miles later, it joins US 6 westbound for several miles near Grinnell, then goes north again. At Toledo, it intersects US 30 and at Waterloo, US 63 meets US 20. An expressway section opened in October 2012, completing the four-lane link between Waterloo and New Hampton. The highway enters Minnesota just north of Chester.

=== Minnesota ===
US 63 enters Minnesota from Iowa south of Spring Valley. After meeting I-90, US 63 serves the local airport and then intersects with US 52. In this area, US 63 is an expressway, but plans are to upgrade the highway to a freeway between Stewartville and the US 52 interchange. North of Rochester, the highway meets US 61 at Lake City. From there, the two routes run concurrently to Red Wing, where US 63 turns north and crosses the Mississippi River to enter Wisconsin over the Eisenhower Bridge.

The Minnesota section of US 63 is defined as Routes 59 and 161 in Minnesota Statutes §§ 161.114(2) and 161.115(92).

=== Wisconsin ===
US 63 enters Wisconsin south of Hager City. Near Baldwin, US 63 intersects I-94. The highway briefly overlaps near Spooner with US 53. At Trego, they separate and US 63 runs southwest to northeast, passing through Hayward and Cable most notably, and ending near Ashland at US 2. According to a 2013 law, the road is referred to as the "Gaylord Nelson Highway" throughout Wisconsin.

== History ==
Though US 63 as a stand-alone highway had always ended at Turrell, Arkansas, before the 1999 extension, in the past it was concurrent with US 61/US 64/US 70/US 79 (and later I-55) on into Memphis, Tennessee, over the Memphis & Arkansas Bridge. Unlike the 1999 extension, this concurrency to Memphis was generally in line with the rest of US 63. Though some maps continued to show this concurrency until 1999, Arkansas had not recognized US 63 south of Turrell for many years, since at least the 1960s.

== Major intersections ==
Louisiana
I-20 / US 167 in Ruston. US 63/US 167 travels concurrently to El Dorado, Arkansas.
Arkansas
US 82 in El Dorado
Future I-69 south of Warren
US 278 in Warren
I-530 / US 65 / US 79 in Pine Bluff. I-530/US 63/US 65 travels concurrently through the city. US 63/US 79 travels concurrently to Stuttgart.
I-530 / US 65 / US 425 in Pine Bluff
US 165 in Stuttgart
US 70 in Hazen. The highways travel concurrently through the city.
I-40 in Hazen. The highways travel concurrently to Brinkley.
US 49 in Brinkley. The highways travel concurrently to Jonesboro.
US 64 in Fair Oaks
I-555 in Jonesboro. The highways travel concurrently through the city.
Future I-57 / US 67 in Walnut Ridge. The highways travel concurrently to Hoxie.
US 412 southeast of Portia. The highways travel concurrently to Hardy.
US 62 in Imboden. The highways travel concurrently to Hardy.
Missouri
US 160 in West Plains. The highways travel concurrently through the city.
US 60 southeast of Willow Springs. The highways travel concurrently to southeast of Cabool.
I-44 in Rolla
US 50 north of Westphalia. The highways travel concurrently to Jefferson City.
US 54 in Jefferson City. The highways travel concurrently through the city.
US 24 in Moberly
US 36 in Macon
US 136 south-southeast of Glenwood. The highways travel concurrently to Lancaster.
Iowa
US 34 in Ottumwa. The highways travel concurrently to east of Ottumwa.
I-80 south of Malcom
US 6 north of Malcom. The highways travel concurrently to north-northwest of Malcom.
US 30 in Toledo
US 20 in Waterloo
US 218 in Waterloo.
US 18 west of Fredericksburg. The highways travel concurrently to New Hampton.
Minnesota
I-90 in Stewartville
US 52 in Rochester
US 14 in Rochester
US 61 in Lake City. The highways travel concurrently to Red Wing.
Wisconsin
US 10 west of Ellsworth. The highways travel concurrently to east of Ellsworth.
I-94 in Baldwin
US 12 in Baldwin. The highways travel concurrently through the village.
US 8 in Turtle Lake. The highways travel concurrently through the village.
US 53 north-northeast of Spooner. The highways travel concurrently to Trego.
US 2 west of Ashland

== Related routes ==
=== Iowa Highway 163 ===
Iowa Highway 163
- Location: Des Moines–Burlington
- Length: 165.902 mi (266.993 km)
- Existed: 1937–present

Iowa Highway 163 (Iowa 163) is state highway in the U.S. state of Iowa that was formerly a spur of US 63 numbered US 163 from US 69 in Des Moines to US 63 near Oskaloosa. It travels 165.902 miles (266.993 km) from Des Moines to US 34 at the Illinois state line in Burlington.
