= Imboden Methodist Episcopal Church, South =

Historic church in Arkansas, United States

- U.S. National Register of Historic Places
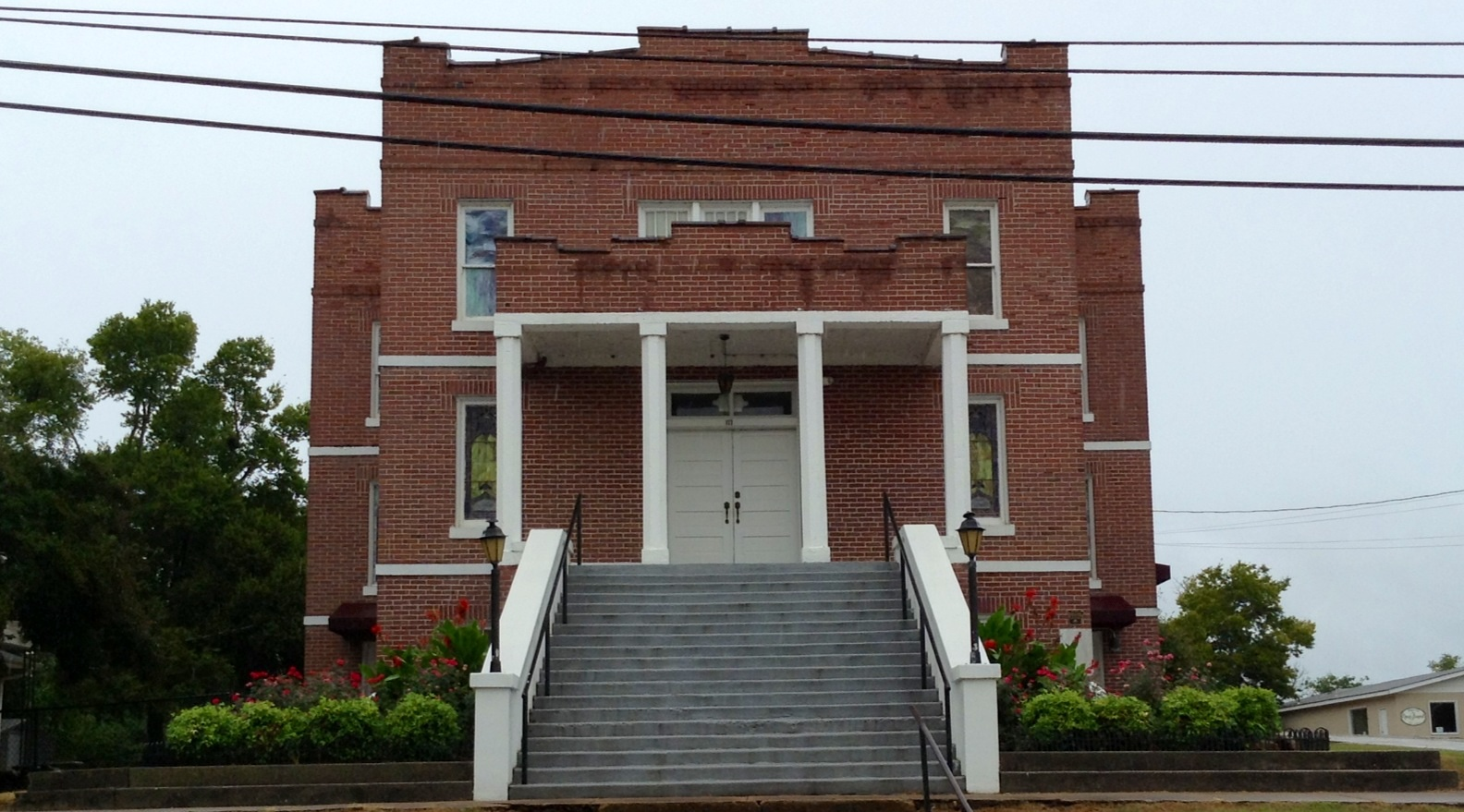

- Location within Arkansas Location within the United States
- Location: 113 Main St., Imboden, Arkansas
- Coordinates: 36°12′17″N 91°10′25″W
- Area: less than one acre
- Built: 1922
- Architect: Rev. James F. Glover
- Architectural style: Classical Revival
- NRHP reference No.: 04000505
- Added to NRHP: June 30, 2004

Imboden Methodist Episcopal Church, South, now the Imboden United Methodist Church, is a historic church at 113 Main Street in Imboden, Arkansas. It is a two-story brick building with Classical Revival styling. Designed by the Reverend James Glover, a former building contractor, it was built in 1922 for a congregation established in 1884, and is the city's finest example of Classical Revival architecture. It has a roughly cruciform plan, with a front porch supported by square posts, and topped by a parapet similar to that ringing the main roof.

The church was listed on the National Register of Historic Places in 2004.

== See also ==
- National Register of Historic Places listings in Lawrence County, Arkansas
