= Old Walnut Ridge Post Office =

- U.S. National Register of Historic Places
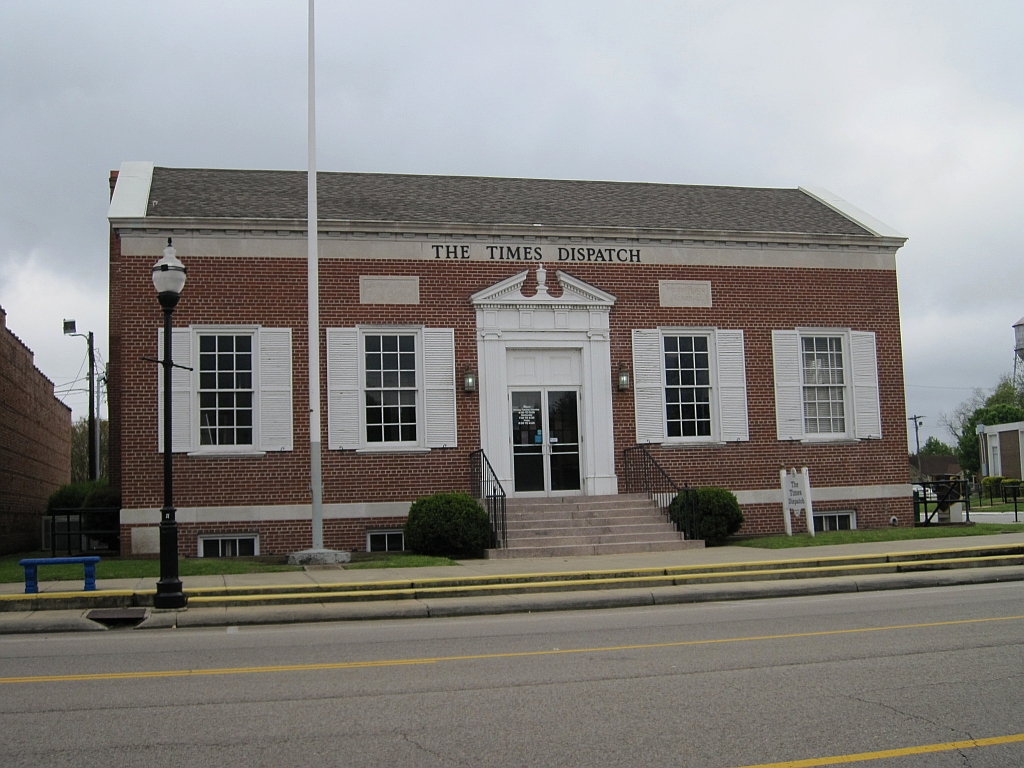

- Location within Arkansas Location within the United States
- Location: 225 W. Main St., Walnut Ridge, Arkansas
- Coordinates: 36°4′10″N 90°57′27″W
- Area: less than one acre
- Built: 1935
- Architect: Office of the Supervising Architect under Louis A. Simon, Neal A. Melick
- Architectural style: Colonial Revival
- NRHP reference No.: 94000496
- Added to NRHP: May 20, 1994

The Old Walnut Ridge Post Office is a historic commercial building at 225 West Main Street in Walnut Ridge, Arkansas. It is a 1 1/2-story T-shaped brick structure, five bays wide, with a side gable roof and a full concrete basement. Its Colonial Revival features include a centered entry, flanked by Ionic pilasters and topped by a broken gabled pediment. The remaining bays are filled with nine-over-nine sash windows. The eave is plain concrete, except for a course of modillions just below the roof line. The building was designed under Louis A. Simon of the Office of the Supervising Architect and was completed in 1935. It served as a post office until 1977, and then served as the facilities of the local Times Dispatch newspaper.

The building was listed on the National Register of Historic Places in 1994.

== See also ==
- National Register of Historic Places listings in Lawrence County, Arkansas
- List of United States post offices
