= Powhatan Historic State Park =

State park in Arkansas, United States

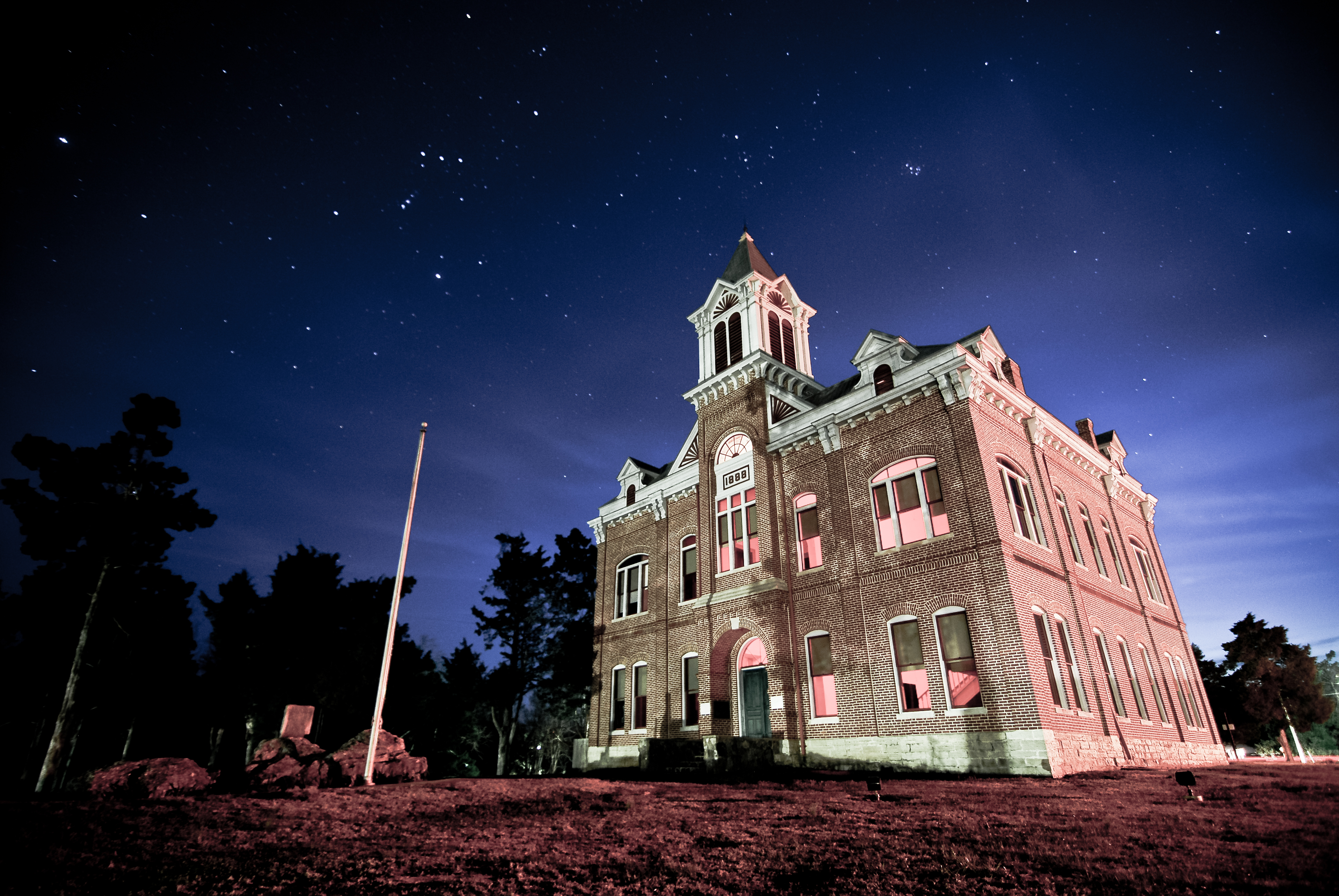
- Historic Powhatan courthouse

- Location within Arkansas Location within the United States
- Interactive map of Powhatan Historic State Park
- Location: Lawrence County, Arkansas, United States
- Coordinates: 36°04′56″N 91°07′08″W
- Area: 9.1 acres (3.7 ha)
- Elevation: 292 ft (89 m)
- Established: 1970
- Administrator: Arkansas Department of Parks and Tourism
- Website: Official website
- Arkansas State Parks

Powhatan Historic State Park (formerly Powhatan Courthouse State Park) is a 9.1-acre (3.7 ha) Arkansas state park in Lawrence County, Arkansas in the United States. The park contains the 1888 Powhatan courthouse which served as the home of county government from 1869 to 1968. Today the structure displays items of cultural and historical significance and hosts the park's Visitor Center. The park includes four additional historical buildings and the Arkansas History Commission's Northeast Arkansas Regional Archives. A tour of the historic structures is available. Powhatan served as an important stop for traffic on the Black River until the installation of the Kansas City-Memphis Railwayline two miles north in 1883 significantly decreased the need for river transportation.

== History ==
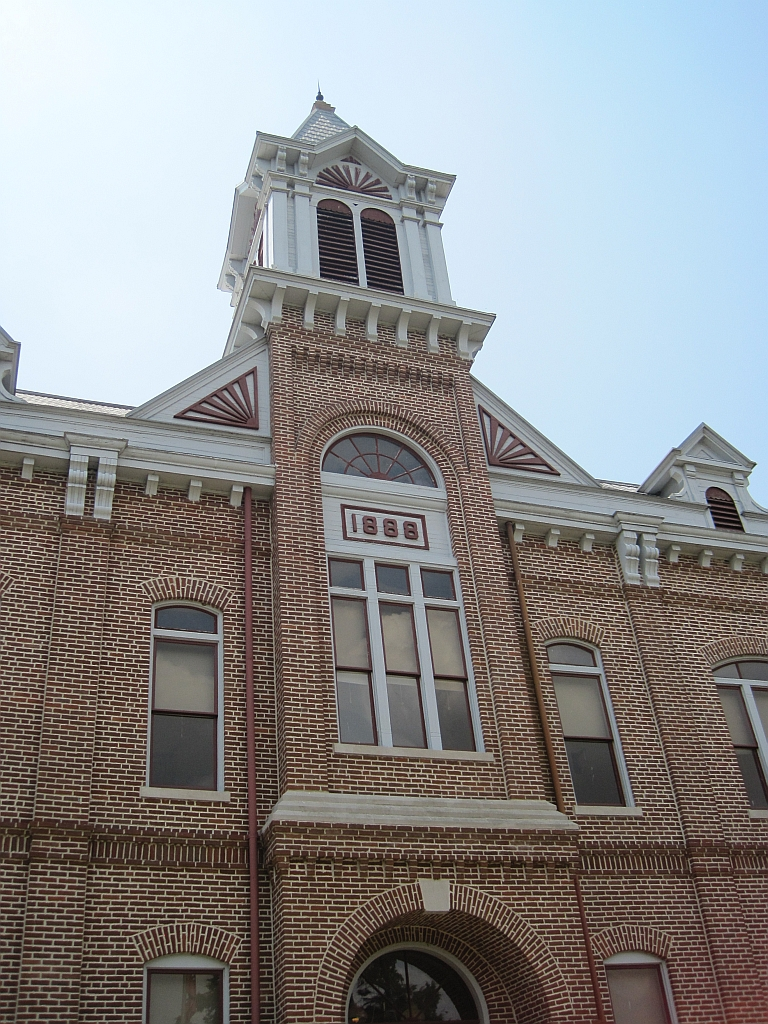
Powhatan Courthouse, June 2011

=== Community history ===
The community was the economic hub of Lawrence County before its first platting in 1849. Situated on the Black River, the community took advantage of river traffic both along the river and as a ferry point for crossing the river. The Military Road passed nearby in the 1830s, and the local economy flourished. The Civil War shut down commerce on the river, especially after the Union acquired Arkansas. Skirmishes throughout the region caused havoc for residents, but a slow recovery began to take place following the war. County government was relocated to Powhatan from Clover Bend, a decision greatly helping Powhatan recover.

Following the natural contours of the land, the Kansas City-Memphis Railway crossed the Black River two moles north of Powhatan through the town of Black Rock, ultimately causing the decline of commercial traffic to Powhatan. The Lawrence County judiciary chose to split in 1887, allowing court to be held in Walnut Ridge and Powhatan. US Route 63 (US 63) was rerouted to bypass Powhatan in the 1950s with the building of the new bridge spanning the Black River, and all county government moved to Walnut Ridge in 1968.

== Structures ==
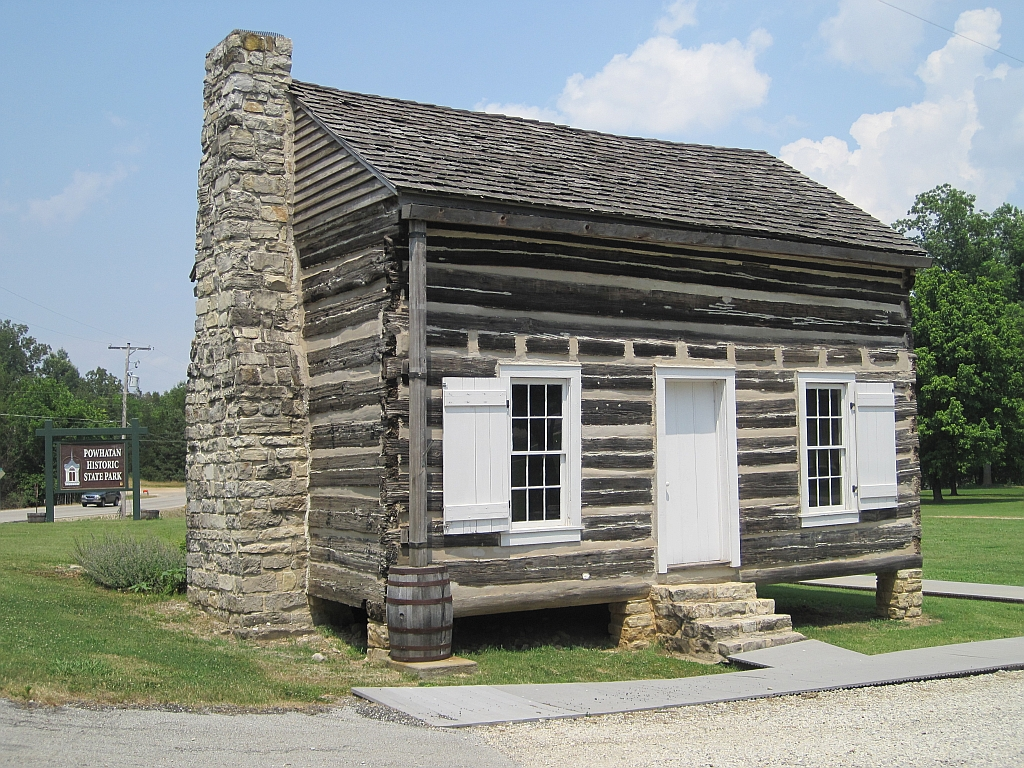
Ficklin-Imboden House, June 2012

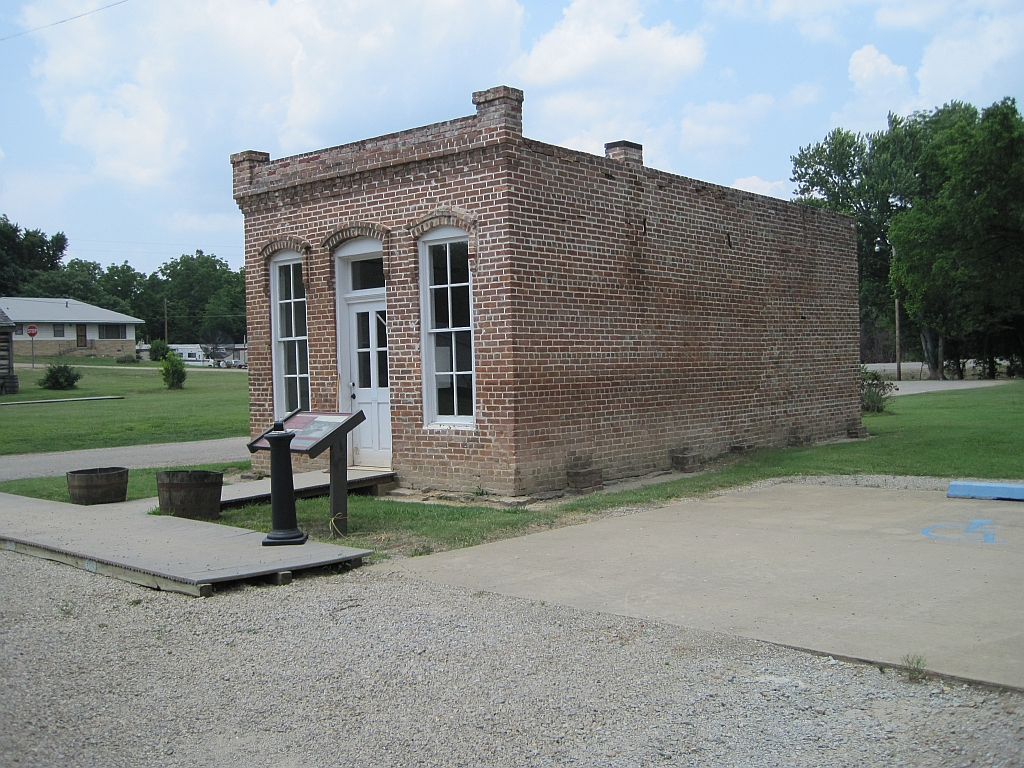
Telephone Exchange Building, June 2012

=== Ficklin-Imboden House ===
Also known as the Powhatan Log House, this is a single-pen log structure with a gable roof, with a second pen added to the rear at a later date. Although its construction date is uncertain, it is believed to date to c. 1850, and to be the oldest extant example of residential architecture in Lawrence County.

=== Powhatan Courthouse ===
The courthouse is set on a rise overlooking the Black River. It is a two-story brick building, set on a stone foundation. Brick pilasters rise two stories at its corners, and between its window bays. It square tower is decorated with heavily bracketed cornices at the top of each stage, and is topped by a pyramidal roof. It was built in 1888, and is one of the government buildings from that period remaining in northeastern Arkansas.

=== Powhatan Jail ===
The jail, located a short walk from the courthouse, is a small single-story limestone and concrete structure with a hip roof that has a cupola-like raised central section to provide ventilation. The jail was built in 1873, and is the only structure in Powhatan to survive from the period of the first courthouse. The building was used as a cannery from 1935 to 1937 by the county's Home Demonstration Clubs (today's Home Extension Service), and has since been restored.

=== Powhatan Schoolhouse ===
The schoolhouse is a single-story wood-frame structure, with a side gable roof and a projecting front-gable section, which houses vestibule area for the two-room schoolhouse. The classroom has a sliding wall partition, enabling its conversion into two rooms. It was built c. 1888, replacing an earlier log structure.

=== Commercial (Telephone Exchange) Building ===
This is a single-story brick building, standing at a historically major street corner in Powhatan. It has a simple three-bay front with segmented-arch openings for windows and a central door. It was built in the 1880s, and is the only surviving commercial building of historic Powhatan. It first served as home to the city's first telephone exchange; later uses included a doctor's office, general store, post office, and private residence.

== See also ==
- National Register of Historic Places listings in Lawrence County, Arkansas
- Jacksonport State Park, a similar historic state park in the region
