= Powhatan, Arkansas =

- Town
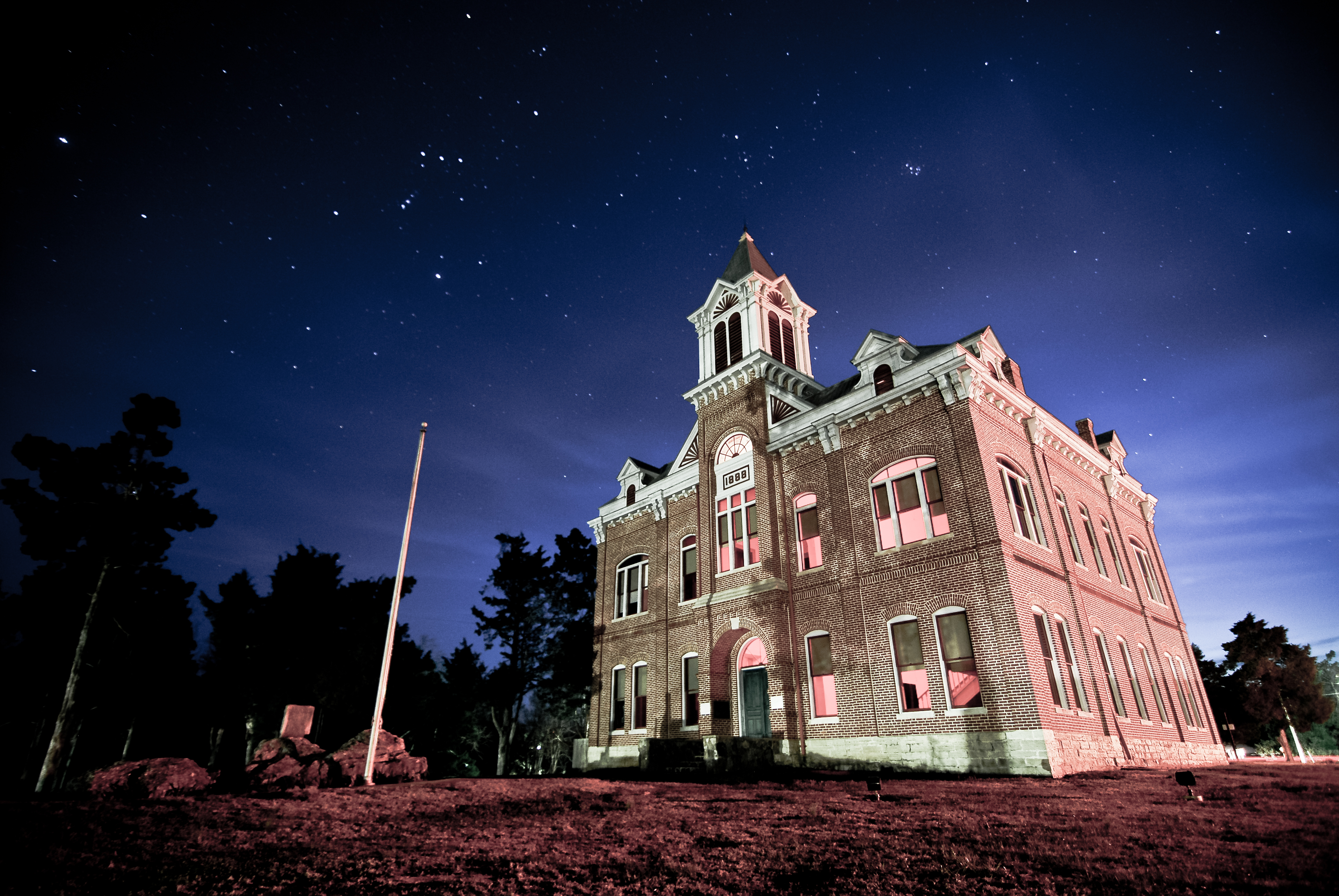
- Powhatan Courthouse, located in Powhatan Historic State Park

- Location in Lawrence County, Arkansas
- Coordinates: 36°4′59″N 91°7′11″W
- Country: United States
- State: Arkansas
- County: Lawrence

Area
  - Total: 0.55 sq mi (1.42 km^{2})
  - Land: 0.55 sq mi (1.42 km^{2})
  - Water: 0 sq mi (0.00 km^{2})
- Elevation: 285 ft (87 m)

Population (2020)
  - Total: 104
  - Estimate (2025): 100 ▼
  - Density: 190.0/sq mi (73.36/km^{2})
- Time zone: UTC-6 (Central (CST))
  - Summer (DST): UTC-5 (CDT)
- ZIP code: 72458
- Area code: 870
- FIPS code: 05-57050
- GNIS feature ID: 0058422

Powhatan (/ˌpaʊhəˈtæn/) is a town in Lawrence County, Arkansas, United States, along the Black River. As of the 2020 census, Powhatan had a population of 104.

== Geography ==
Powhatan is located in northern Lawrence County at 36°4′59″N 91°7′11″W (36.083098, -91.119626).

According to the United States Census Bureau, the town has a total area of 0.22 square miles (0.56 km^{2}), all land.

=== Transportation ===
The main highway serving Powhatan is Arkansas Highway 25 (AR 25). The route continues northeast from Powhatan 2 miles (3 km) to Black Rock and southwest 48 miles (77 km) to Batesville. Highway 117S, a short spur route of Highway 117, runs into Powhatan and terminates at AR 25. Access to US Route 62/US Route 63/US Route 412 (US 62/US 63/US 412), a concurrency of major east–west routes, is available in Black Rock.

== History ==
The community was the economic hub of Lawrence County even before first platting in 1849. Situated on the Black River, the community took advantage of river traffic both along the river and as a ferry point for crossing the river. The Military Road passed nearby in the 1830s, and the local economy was flourishing. The Civil War shut down commerce on the river, especially after the Union regained control of Arkansas. Skirmishes throughout the region caused havoc for residents, but a slow recovery began to take place following the war. County government was relocated to Powhatan from Clover Bend, a decision greatly helping Powhatan recover.

The Kansas City-Memphis Railway chose to bypass Powhatan around 1880, causing nearby Black Rock to grow to prominence instead. The Lawrence County judiciary chose to split in 1887, allowing court to be held in Walnut Ridge and Powhatan. US Route 63 (US 63) was rerouted to bypass Powhatan in the 1950s, and all county government moved to Walnut Ridge in 1963.

== Demographics ==
Historical population
Census	Pop.	Note	%±
1880	196		—
1890	220		12.2%
1900	249		13.2%
1910	191		−23.3%
1920	134		−29.8%
1930	110		−17.9%
1940	137		24.5%
1950	120		−12.4%
1960	136		13.3%
1970	84		−38.2%
1980	49		−41.7%
1990	51		4.1%
2000	50		−2.0%
2010	72		44.0%
2020	104		44.4%
2025 (est.)	100	▼	−3.8%
U.S. Decennial Census

As of the census of 2000, there were 50 people, 18 households, and 14 families residing in the town. The population density was 160.9/km^{2} (412.3/mi^{2}). There were 21 housing units at an average density of 67.6/km^{2} (173.2/mi^{2}). The racial makeup of the town was 98.00% White, and 2.00% from two or more races.

There were 18 households, out of which 38.9% had children under the age of 18 living with them, 72.2% were married couples living together, 5.6% had a female householder with no husband present, and 22.2% were non-families. 16.7% of all households were made up of individuals, and none had someone living alone who was 65 years of age or older. The average household size was 2.78 and the average family size was 3.21.

In the town, the population was spread out, with 26.0% under the age of 18, 8.0% from 18 to 24, 20.0% from 25 to 44, 28.0% from 45 to 64, and 18.0% who were 65 years of age or older. The median age was 42 years. For every 100 females, there were 108.3 males. For every 100 females age 18 and over, there were 105.6 males.

The median income for a household in the town was $31,875, and the median income for a family was $42,917. Males had a median income of $41,250 versus $28,750 for females. The per capita income for the town was $13,149. There were no families and 12.2% of the population living below the poverty line, including no under eighteens and 50.0% of those over 64.

== See also ==
- Powhatan Historic State Park
