= Smithville, Arkansas =

- Town
- Location in Lawrence County, Arkansas
- Coordinates: 36°4′48″N 91°18′14″W
- Country: United States
- State: Arkansas
- County: Lawrence

Area
  - Total: 0.67 sq mi (1.73 km^{2})
  - Land: 0.67 sq mi (1.73 km^{2})
  - Water: 0 sq mi (0.00 km^{2})
- Elevation: 351 ft (107 m)

Population (2020)
  - Total: 87
  - Estimate (2025): 82 ▼
  - Density: 130.6/sq mi (50.43/km^{2})
- Time zone: UTC-6 (Central (CST))
  - Summer (DST): UTC-5 (CDT)
- ZIP code: 72466
- Area code: 870
- FIPS code: 05-64910
- GNIS feature ID: 0058647

Smithville is a town in Lawrence County, Arkansas, United States. As of the 2020 census, Smithville had a population of 87.

== History ==
Euro-American settlers first came to the area of Smithville in 1808.

Smithville became the county seat of modern-day Lawrence County in 1837. The county seat was later moved to Powhatan in 1869, after the Civil War. This was done in part to take advantage of riverboat commerce along the Black River.

Smithville was the nearest town to the final shoot-out between law enforcement and the infamous tax fugitive Gordon Kahl on June 2, 1983, in which Lawrence County Sheriff Harold Gene Matthews was also killed. Smithville lies a few miles south of the actual shootout location.

== Geography ==
Smithville is located in western Lawrence County at 36°4′48″N 91°18′14″W (36.080031, -91.303781). Arkansas Highway 117 runs east 13 miles (21 km) to Black Rock and south 9 miles (14 km) to Strawberry. Highway 115 runs northeast 12 miles (19 km) to Imboden (and thus connects to US 412) and southwest toward Cave City in Sharp County, 21 miles (34 km) away.

According to the United States Census Bureau, the town of Smithville has a total area of 4.5 square kilometres (1.73 sq mi), all land.

Smithville is nestled in the Ozark Foothills on the Salem Plateau, which is a part of the larger Ozark Plateau. The eastern third of Smithville is a low-lying area, prone to flooding from Machine Creek. The center of Smithville is atop a small hill. As one travels west or north of Smithville, rolling hills can be found in either direction. West of Smithville lies Peebles Bluff.

Regionally, Smithville lies approximately in the center of the Cooper Creek Watershed Improvement District. This district consists of a series of reservoirs designed to mitigate flooding. Local names have been applied to these reservoirs:

Site 1: West Cooper Creek Lake Site 2: East Cooper Creek Lake Site 3: Dogwood Lake Site 4: Machine Lake Site 5: Goff Lake Site 6: Ed's Lake

== Demographics ==
Historical population
Census	Pop.	Note	%±
1970	89		—
1980	113		27.0%
1990	86		−23.9%
2000	73		−15.1%
2010	78		6.8%
2020	87		11.5%
2025 (est.)	82	▼	−5.7%
U.S. Decennial Census

As of the census of 2000, there were 73 people, 33 households, and 22 families residing in the town. The population density was 47.0/km^{2} (121.5/mi^{2}). There were 41 housing units at an average density of 26.4/km^{2} (68.2/mi^{2}). The racial makeup of the town was 97.26% White, 1.37% Black or African American and 1.37% Native American.

There were 33 households, out of which 30.3% had children under the age of 18 living with them, 54.5% were married couples living together, 9.1% had a female householder with no husband present, and 33.3% were non-families. 27.3% of all households were made up of individuals, and 21.2% had someone living alone who was 65 years of age or older. The average household size was 2.21 and the average family size was 2.64.

In the town, the population was spread out, with 21.9% under the age of 18, 2.7% from 18 to 24, 28.8% from 25 to 44, 16.4% from 45 to 64, and 30.1% who were 65 years of age or older. The median age was 43 years. For every 100 females, there were 92.1 males. For every 100 females age 18 and over, there were 96.6 males.

The median income for a household in the town was $36,250, and the median income for a family was $45,250. Males had a median income of $30,625 versus $19,375 for females. The per capita income for the town was $11,687. There were 11.1% of families and 26.5% of the population living below the poverty line, including 32.0% of under eighteens and 53.3% of those over 64.

== Law and government ==
The current mayor of Smithville is Chris Penn.

== Education ==
Smithville is in the Hillcrest School District.

It was formerly in the Lynn School District. On July 1, 2004, it merged into the Hillcrest district.
