= Denton, Arkansas =

Coordinates: 36.095°N 91.208°W

Denton, Arkansas was a village in Lawrence County. It is currently uninhabited and its only remains are the Bethel Cemetery where former residents were buried.

== History ==
In 1830, Denton was founded. It was one of the first unincorporated communities in Lawrence County. About ten years later in 1844, the New Hope Baptist Church of Denton was established, and still exists today. In 1979, Everett Moore and Loma Moore were the last inhabitants to move away.

32 years later, in 2011, the cemetery was added to the National Register of Historic Places.
