= Imboden (surname) =

Imboden is a German surname; it is translated "someone living on the valley bottom", derived from Middle High German bodem boden, meaning "floor bottom ground". Notable people with the surname include:

- Connie Imboden (fl. 1987–present), American photographer
- Facundo Imboden (born 1980), Argentine footballer
- Francisca Imboden (born 1972), Chilean film, theater and television actress
- John D. Imboden (1823–1895), American lawyer, Virginia state legislator and Confederate army general
- Race Imboden (born 1993), American foil fencer and menswear fashion model
- Tris Imboden (born 1951), American rock and jazz drummer
- Urs Imboden (born 1975), Swiss alpine skier
