= Clover Bend, Arkansas =

Unincorporated community in Arkansas, US

Coordinates: 35°58′57″N 91°5′38″W

Clover Bend is an unincorporated community in Lawrence County, Arkansas, United States. It is the location of two historic sites listed on the U.S. National Register of Historic Places: the Clover Bend High School, on Arkansas Highway 228 (AR 228), and the Clover Bend Historic District, at the junction of AR 228 and Co. Rd. 1220.
