= Portia, Arkansas =

- Town
- Location in Lawrence County, Arkansas
- Coordinates: 36°5′7″N 91°4′6″W
- Country: United States
- State: Arkansas
- County: Lawrence

Area
  - Total: 1.29 sq mi (3.35 km^{2})
  - Land: 1.29 sq mi (3.35 km^{2})
  - Water: 0 sq mi (0.00 km^{2})
- Elevation: 262 ft (80 m)

Population (2020)
  - Total: 424
  - Estimate (2025): 515 ▲
  - Density: 328.1/sq mi (126.67/km^{2})
- Time zone: UTC-6 (Central (CST))
  - Summer (DST): UTC-5 (CDT)
- ZIP code: 72457
- Area code: 870
- FIPS code: 05-56720
- GNIS feature ID: 0053704

Portia is a town in Lawrence County, Arkansas, United States. As of the 2020 census, Portia had a population of 424.

== Geography ==
Portia is located in north-central Lawrence County at 36°5′7″N 91°4′6″W (36.085273, -91.068430).

According to the United States Census Bureau, the town has a total area of 1.3 square miles (3.3 km^{2}), all land.

U.S. Routes 63 and 412 run concurrently through the center of town, leading northwest 2 miles (3 km) to Black Rock. To the southeast, US 412 leads 6.5 miles (10.5 km) to Walnut Ridge, the county seat, while US 63 leads 6 miles (10 km) to Hoxie.

== Demographics ==
Historical population
| Census | Pop. | Note | %± |
|---|---|---|---|
| 1890 | 571 | | — |
| 1900 | 400 | | −29.9% |
| 1910 | 367 | | −8.2% |
| 1920 | 519 | | 41.4% |
| 1930 | 416 | | −19.8% |
| 1940 | 393 | | −5.5% |
| 1950 | 349 | | −11.2% |
| 1960 | 333 | | −4.6% |
| 1970 | 381 | | 14.4% |
| 1980 | 480 | | 26.0% |
| 1990 | 521 | | 8.5% |
| 2000 | 483 | | −7.3% |
| 2010 | 437 | | −9.5% |
| 2020 | 424 | | −3.0% |
| 2025 (est.) | 515 | ▲ | 21.5% |
U.S. Decennial Census

As of the census of 2000, there were 483 people, 206 households, and 138 families residing in the town. The population density was 144.6/km^{2} (373.8/mi^{2}). There were 225 housing units at an average density of 67.3/km^{2} (174.1/mi^{2}). The racial makeup of the town was 97.10% White, 1.24% Black or African American, 1.45% Native American, and 0.21% from two or more races. 1.66% of the population were Hispanic or Latino of any race.

There were 206 households, out of which 25.7% had children under the age of 18 living with them, 55.3% were married couples living together, 11.2% had a female householder with no husband present, and 33.0% were non-families. 31.6% of all households were made up of individuals, and 21.4% had someone living alone who was 65 years of age or older. The average household size was 2.30 and the average family size was 2.88.

In the town, the population was spread out, with 22.2% under the age of 18, 8.1% from 18 to 24, 24.4% from 25 to 44, 19.5% from 45 to 64, and 25.9% who were 65 years of age or older. The median age was 40 years. For every 100 females, there were 83.0 males. For every 100 females age 18 and over, there were 76.5 males.

The median income for a household in the town was $21,250, and the median income for a family was $31,250. Males had a median income of $24,750 versus $18,182 for females. The per capita income for the town was $13,118. About 20.0% of families and 32.7% of the population were below the poverty line, including 55.6% of those under age 18 and 29.7% of those age 65 or over.
