= Imboden, Arkansas =

- City
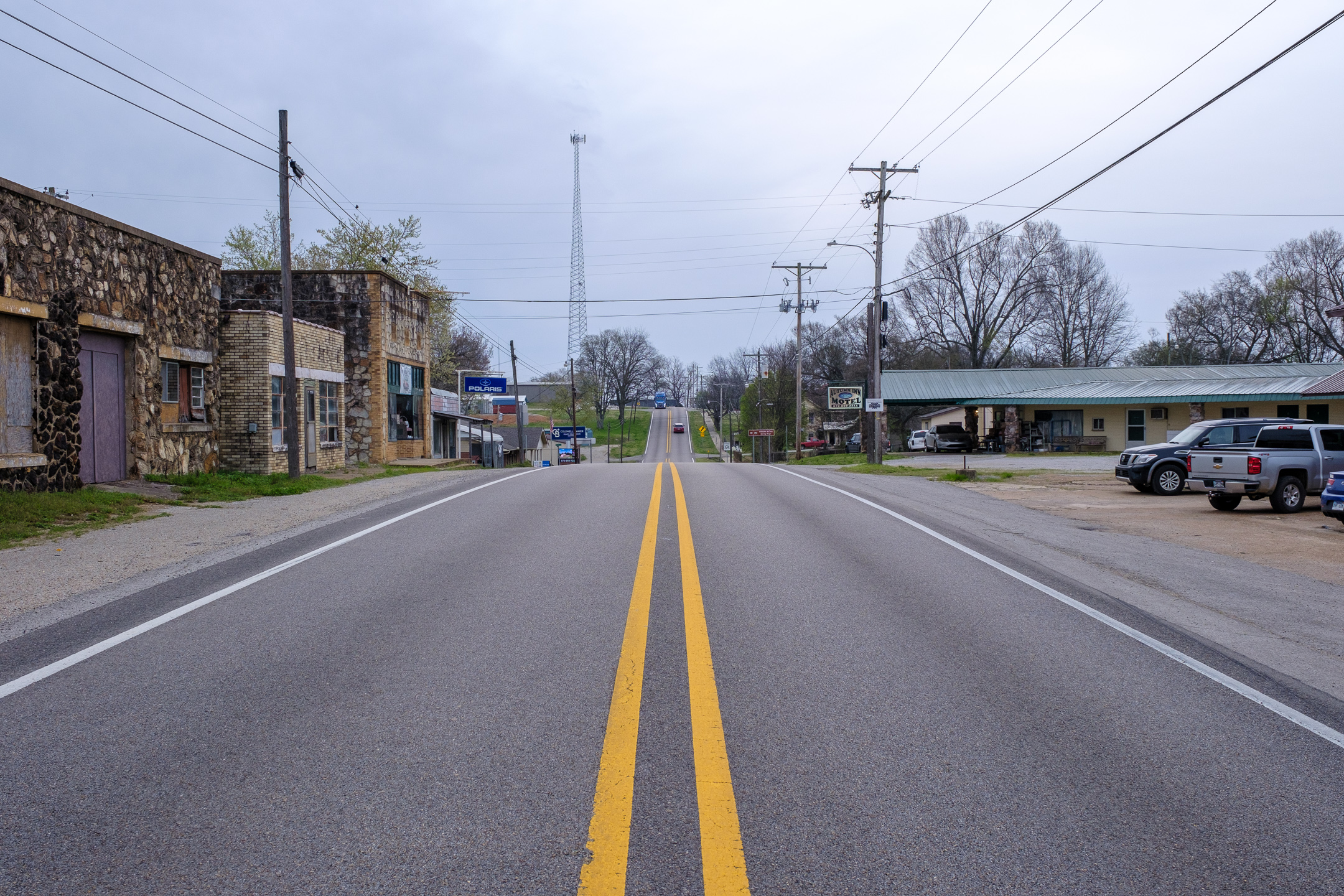
- Main Street in Imboden

- Location in Lawrence County, Arkansas
- Coordinates: 36°12′6″N 91°10′48″W
- Country: United States
- State: Arkansas
- County: Lawrence

Area
  - Total: 1.27 sq mi (3.30 km^{2})
  - Land: 1.27 sq mi (3.30 km^{2})
  - Water: 0 sq mi (0.00 km^{2})
- Elevation: 315 ft (96 m)

Population (2020)
  - Total: 640
  - Estimate (2025): 627 ▼
  - Density: 502.9/sq mi (194.16/km^{2})
- Time zone: UTC-6 (Central (CST))
  - Summer (DST): UTC-5 (CDT)
- ZIP code: 72434
- Area code: 870
- FIPS code: 05-34150
- GNIS feature ID: 0057965
- Website: www.imbodenarkansas.com

Imboden is a city in Lawrence County, Arkansas, United States. The population was 640 at the 2020 census. It is named after a family of settlers.

== History ==
The community was first settled around 1828 and was incorporated in 1887.

In 1912, Imboden elected Joe Sullivan as the youngest elected mayor in the United States of that period. He was 21 years old and paralyzed, so relied on a goat-driven cart. He left the town in 1914 to pursue further education.

Imboden has two public schools. Sloan-Hendrix School was established in 1899 as Sloan-Hendrix Academy, a private school affiliated with Hendrix College in Conway. It later became a public school. Imboden Area Charter School, an open-enrollment public charter school, opened in 2002.

== Geography ==
Imboden is located in northwestern Lawrence County at 36°12′6″N 91°10′48″W (36.201766, -91.179899). It is on the south side of the Spring River, a southeast-flowing tributary of the Black River. In October 2008 a modern boat launch was opened with a 20-by-210-foot (6.1 by 64.0 m) parking area. To the north of Imboden, across the Spring River, is Randolph County.

According to the United States Census Bureau, the town has a total area of 0.97 square miles (2.5 km^{2}), all land.

== List of highways ==
- US 62/US 63/US 412 run through the center of Imboden. The three highways leave to the west on West 3rd Street, leading 21 miles (34 km) northwest to Hardy. Highway 62 splits off to the northeast in the center of Imboden, crossing the Spring River and leading northeast 15 miles (24 km) to Pocahontas. Highways 63 and 412 leave to the southeast on East 3rd Street, leading 9 miles (14 km) to Black Rock.
- Arkansas Highway 115 leads southwest from Imboden 12 miles (19 km) to Smithville.

== Demographics ==
Historical population
Census	Pop.	Note	%±
1890	157		—
1900	411		161.8%
1910	600		46.0%
1920	630		5.0%
1930	564		−10.5%
1940	525		−6.9%
1950	447		−14.9%
1960	400		−10.5%
1970	496		24.0%
1980	661		33.3%
1990	616		−6.8%
2000	684		11.0%
2010	677		−1.0%
2020	640		−5.5%
2025 (est.)	627	▼	−2.0%
U.S. Decennial Census

=== 2020 census ===
Imboden racial composition
Race	Number	Percentage
White (non-Hispanic)	580	90.63%
Black or African American (non-Hispanic)	4	0.63%
Native American	2	0.31%
Asian	1	0.16%
Other/Mixed	30	4.69%
Hispanic or Latino	23	3.59%

As of the 2020 United States census, there were 640 people, 294 households, and 203 families residing in the town.

=== 2000 census ===
As of the census of 2000, there were 684 people, 308 households, and 194 families residing in the town. The population density was 760.5 inhabitants per square mile (293.6/km^{2}). There were 343 housing units at an average density of 381.3 per square mile (147.2/km^{2}). The racial makeup of the town was 98.25% Whites, 0.73% Native Americans, and 1.02% from two or more races. 0.29% of the population were Hispanics or Latinos of any race.

There were 308 households, out of which 24.4% had children under the age of 18 living with them, 54.9% were married couples living together, 6.2% had a female householder with no husband present, and 37.0% were non-families. 35.7% of all households were made up of individuals, and 23.4% had someone living alone who was 65 years of age or older. The average household size was 2.22 and the average family size was 2.85.

In the town, the population was spread out, with 23.0% under the age of 18, 6.9% from 18 to 24, 22.7% from 25 to 44, 22.1% from 45 to 64, and 25.4% who were 65 years of age or older. The median age was 43 years. For every 100 females, there were 82.4 males. For every 100 females age 18 and over, there were 82.4 males.

The median income for a household in the town was $24,489, and the median income for a family was $33,438. Males had a median income of $28,977 versus $16,667 for females. The per capita income for the town was $14,361. About 11.1% of families and 17.8% of the population were below the poverty line, including 28.4% of those under age 18 and 9.8% of those age 65 or over.

== Education ==
Public education is provided by:

- Sloan–Hendrix School District, which leads to graduation from Sloan–Hendrix High School.
- Imboden Area Charter School, an open-enrollment school for kindergarten through eighth grade.

The Imboden Disaster Facility is currently being constructed in town. This facility is part of the Regional Center for Disaster Preparedness Education - Arkansas State University.

== Government ==
=== Administration ===
As of July 2026, the administration of Imboden consists of:

- Mayor - Chris Jones
- Treasurer/Recorder - Belinda Chappell
- Administrative Specialist - Samantha Moore
- City Council Members
  - Joe Chappell
  - Preston Clark
  - Creston Hutton
  - Rebecca Jones
  - Dan Matthews

=== Emergency services ===
Police

- Lawrence County Sheriff's Department
- Arkansas State Police (Troop B)

Fire/Rescue

- Imboden Volunteer Fire Department
- Lawrence County Dive Team
- Volunteer First Responders

Ambulance

- ProMed Ambulance
- Survival Flight 9

== Attractions and recreation ==
- Lawrence County Fair and Rodeo - located on the Sloan-Hendrix Campus
- Annual Lawrence County Fair Auto Show - located in Imboden City Park
- Annual July 4 fireworks show - located near Sloan-Hendrix Campus
- Annual Freedom in the Park Celebration - located in Imboden City Park
- Annual Christmas Parade
