= Spring Hill =

Spring Hill may refer to:

== Places ==
=== Australia ===
- Spring Hill, New South Wales (Orange), a small town near the city of Orange
- Spring Hill, New South Wales (Wollongong), a suburb of the city of Wollongong
- Spring Hill, Queensland, a suburb of Brisbane
- Spring Hill, Victoria, County of Talbot

=== United Kingdom ===
- Spring Hill, East Cowes, Isle of Wight, formerly home to the Shedden family

=== United States ===
==== Alabama ====
- Old Spring Hill, Alabama, an unincorporated community in Marengo County
- Spring Hill, Barbour County, Alabama, an unincorporated community
- Spring Hill, Butler County, Alabama, an unincorporated community
- Spring Hill, Choctaw County, Alabama, an unincorporated community
- Spring Hill, Conecuh County, Alabama, an unincorporated community
- Spring Hill, Cullman County, Alabama, an unincorporated community
- Spring Hill, Escambia County, Alabama, an unincorporated community
- Spring Hill (Mobile, Alabama), a neighborhood, formerly a separate town
- Spring Hill, Walker County, Alabama, an unincorporated community

==== Arkansas ====
- Springhill, Faulkner County, Arkansas, an unincorporated community
- Spring Hill, Hempstead County, Arkansas, location of Dooley's Ferry Fortifications Historic District

==== Connecticut ====
- Spring Hill (Norwalk), a neighborhood
- Spring Hill Historic District (Mansfield, Connecticut)

==== Florida ====
- Spring Hill, Florida
- Spring Hill, Santa Rosa County, Florida

==== Georgia ====
- Spring Hill, Georgia, an unincorporated community

==== Indiana ====
- Spring Hill, Indiana, a town
- Spring Hill, Vigo County, Indiana, a township

==== Iowa ====
- Spring Hill, Iowa, a city

==== Kansas ====
- Spring Hill, Kansas, a city

==== Kentucky ====
- Spring Hill (Ballardsville, Kentucky), on the National Register of Historic Places listings in Oldham County, Kentucky

==== Massachusetts ====
- Spring Hill (Massachusetts), a mountain
- Spring Hill Historic District (Sandwich, Massachusetts)
- Spring Hill, Somerville, Massachusetts, a neighborhood
  - Spring Hill Historic District (Somerville, Massachusetts)

==== Minnesota ====
- Spring Hill, Minnesota, a township
- Spring Hill Township, Stearns County, Minnesota, a township

==== Missouri ====
- Spring Hill, Missouri

==== North Carolina ====
- Spring Hill (Raleigh, North Carolina)

==== Ohio ====
- Springhills, Ohio
- Spring Hill (Massillon, Ohio), on the National Register of Historic Places listings in Stark County, Ohio

==== Pennsylvania ====
- Spring Hill, Pennsylvania, a census-designated place in Cambria County
- Spring Hill–City View (Pittsburgh), a neighborhood in Pittsburgh, Pennsylvania

==== Tennessee ====
- Spring Hill, Tennessee, a town
- Spring Hill, Gibson County, Tennessee, a community

==== Texas ====
- Spring Hill, Bowie County, Texas
- Spring Hill, Gregg County, Texas, a ghost town

==== Virginia ====
- Spring Hill (Ivy, Virginia)
- Spring Hill (Providence Forge, Virginia)

== Education ==
- Spring Hill College, in Mobile, Alabama
- Spring Hill Elementary School, in Pittsburgh, Pennsylvania
- Spring Hill High School (disambiguation)
- Spring Hill School District (disambiguation)
- Spring Hill College, part of Moseley School, Birmingham, England

== Other uses ==
- Battle of Spring Hill, during the American Civil War
- HM Prison Spring Hill, a men's prison in Grendon Underwood, Buckinghamshire, England
- Spring Hill station, a Washington Metro station in Tysons Corner, Virginia, United States

== See also ==
- Spring Hill Cemetery (disambiguation)
- Spring Hill Fair, an album by Australian band The Go-Betweens
- Spring Hill Farm (disambiguation)
- Springhill (disambiguation)
- Springhills, a locality in the central Southland region of New Zealand's South Island
- Springhills, Ohio
- Tel Aviv, a city whose name means "Spring Hill"
