= Spring Hill Historic District =

Spring Hill Historic District may refer to:

- Spring Hill Historic District (Mansfield, Connecticut)
- Spring Hill (Ballardsville, Kentucky), on the National Register of Historic Places listings in Oldham County, Kentucky
- Spring Hill Historic District (Sandwich, Massachusetts)
- Spring Hill Historic District (Somerville, Massachusetts)
- Spring Hill (Raleigh, North Carolina)
- Spring Hill (Massillon, Ohio), on the National Register of Historic Places listings in Stark County, Ohio

== See also ==
- Spring Hill (disambiguation)
