= Springhill =

Springhill may refer to:

== Places ==
=== Canada ===
- Springhill, Nova Scotia, a community in Cumberland County
- Springhill, Ontario, an unincorporated community in Champlain
- Springhill, a former hamlet now part of King City, Ontario

=== Malaysia ===
- Bandar Springhill, a town in Negeri Sembilan

=== United Kingdom ===
- Springhill (Bangor suburb), a suburb of Bangor, County Down, Northern Ireland
- Springhill, East Renfrewshire, a location in Scotland
- Springhill, Glasgow, a neighborhood of Glasgow, Scotland
- Springhill, Isle of Wight, a location in England
- Springhill, North Lanarkshire, a neighbourhood of Shotts, Scotland
- Springhill, Lichfield, a location in Staffordshire, England
- Springhill, South Staffordshire, Staffordshire, England
- Springhill House, Northern Ireland, a notable house and estate in Moneymore, County Londonderry

=== United States ===
- Springhill, Alabama
- Springhill, Faulkner County, Arkansas
- Springhill, Indiana
- Springhill, Louisiana
- Springhill, Missouri
- Springhill, Montana

== Other uses ==
- Springhill (TV series), a drama series made by Granada Television
- Springhill (film), a 1972 Canadian television film directed by Ron Kelly
- SpringHill Entertainment, a video production company founded by LeBron James and Maverick Carter

== See also ==
- Springhill massacre, Belfast, Northern Ireland, five people shot dead by British Army soldiers in 1972
- Springhill mining disaster, any of three mining disasters in different mines near the community of Springhill, Nova Scotia
- Tel Aviv, a city whose name translates to "Spring Hill"
- Spring Hill (disambiguation)
- Springhills, a locality in the central Southland region of New Zealand's South Island
- Springhills, Ohio
