= Springhill Township =

Springhill Township may refer to one of the following townships in the United States:

- Springhill Township, Hempstead County, Arkansas
- Springhill Township, Wilson County, North Carolina
- Springhill Township, Pennsylvania (disambiguation) (two townships)

See also

- Springhill (disambiguation)
