= Dix Hill =

Historic district in North Carolina, United States

- U.S. National Register of Historic Places
- U.S. Historic district
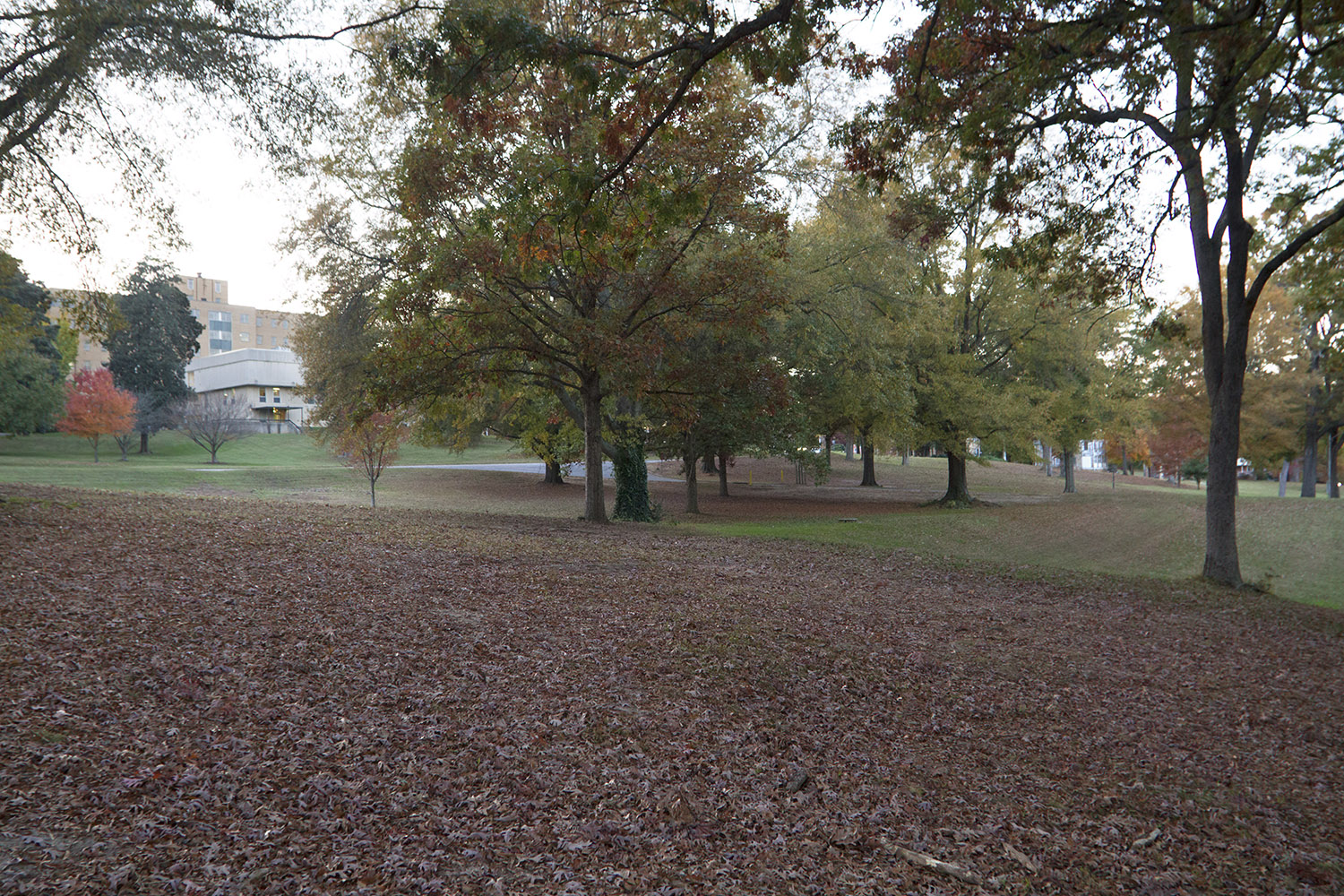

- Location within North Carolina Location within the United States
- Location: Roughly bounded by Dorothea Dr., Lake Wheeler Rd. and the Norfolk Southern RR tracks, Raleigh, North Carolina
- Coordinates: 35°46′6″N 78°39′15″W
- Built: 1898
- Architect: Davis, A.J.; Et al.
- Architectural style: Colonial Revival, Bungalow/Craftsman, Stick/Eastlake
- NRHP reference No.: 90001638
- Added to NRHP: November 07, 1990

Dix Hill is the informal name for a high, rolling expanse of land and national historic district located at Raleigh, North Carolina. The district encompasses 18 contributing buildings, 1 contributing site, and 3 contributing structures. It includes notable examples of Colonial Revival, Bungalow / American Craftsman, and Stick Style / Eastlake movement architecture. The Dorothea Dix Hospital, a historic institution caring for the mentally ill, was located on the site. Many of the hospital buildings, developed between about 1856 and 1940, are still there. The Dix Hill Historic District is now part of Raleigh's 308-acre Dix Park.

It was listed on the National Register of Historic Places in 1990.

Dix Hill is referred to in David Sedaris's novel Naked. It also appears in James Hurst's short story "The Scarlet Ibis" (first published July 1960 in The Atlantic Monthly).
