= Dorothea Dix Hospital =

- North Carolina Department of Health and Human Services
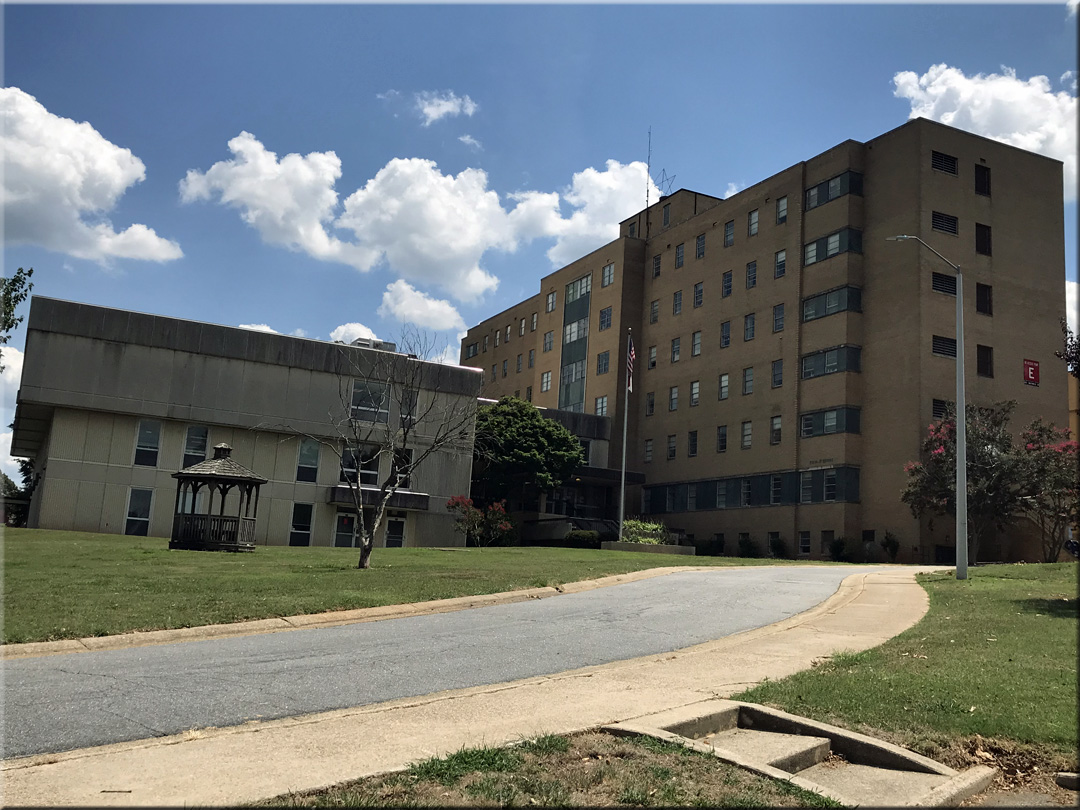
- A photo of the NCDHHS Dorothea Dix Campus in Raleigh, North Carolina. Pictured are the Hargrove Building (left) and McBryde Building (right) as viewed from Smithwick Drive.

Geography
- Location: Dorothea Dix Campus; Ryan McBryde Building; 820 South Boylan Avenue; Raleigh, North Carolina 27603
- Coordinates: 35.7690405°N 78.6552815°W

Organisation
- Type: Specialist

Services
- Speciality: Psychiatric

History
- Founded: February 22, 1856
- Closed: August 10, 2012

Links
- Website: https://www.ncdhhs.gov/ (NCDHHS Dorothea Dix Campus) https://dixpark.org/ (Dorothea Dix Park)

The Dorothea Dix Hospital was the first North Carolina psychiatric hospital, located three miles southwest of downtown Raleigh, North Carolina, and named after mental health advocate Dorothea Dix from New England. It was founded in 1856 and closed in 2012. Much of the site is now designated as Dix Park and serves as Raleigh's largest city park. Part of the campus is a historical district called Dix Hill.

== Names ==
The hospital had several name changes over the years. From the initial planning stage, legislators gave it the name The Insane Asylum of North Carolina, and it returned to this name in 1869. According to the National Park Service, the hospital opened in 1856 under the name North Carolina Hospital for the Mentally Ill. It was known for some period of time as the Lunatic Asylum for the State of North Carolina before returning to its original name. The hospital was then known briefly as the Central Hospital for the Insane before being renamed to The State Hospital at Raleigh. It was officially named Dorothea Dix Hospital in 1959. Throughout its existence, the hospital has been informally known as Dix Hill.

== History ==
=== Spring Hill plantation ===
The land where the hospital was built was previously operated as the Spring Hill Plantation, built by Theophilus Hunter in the 1700s. This plantation covered over 5,000 acres of farmland and was worked by up to 90 enslaved Black people.

=== Opening ===
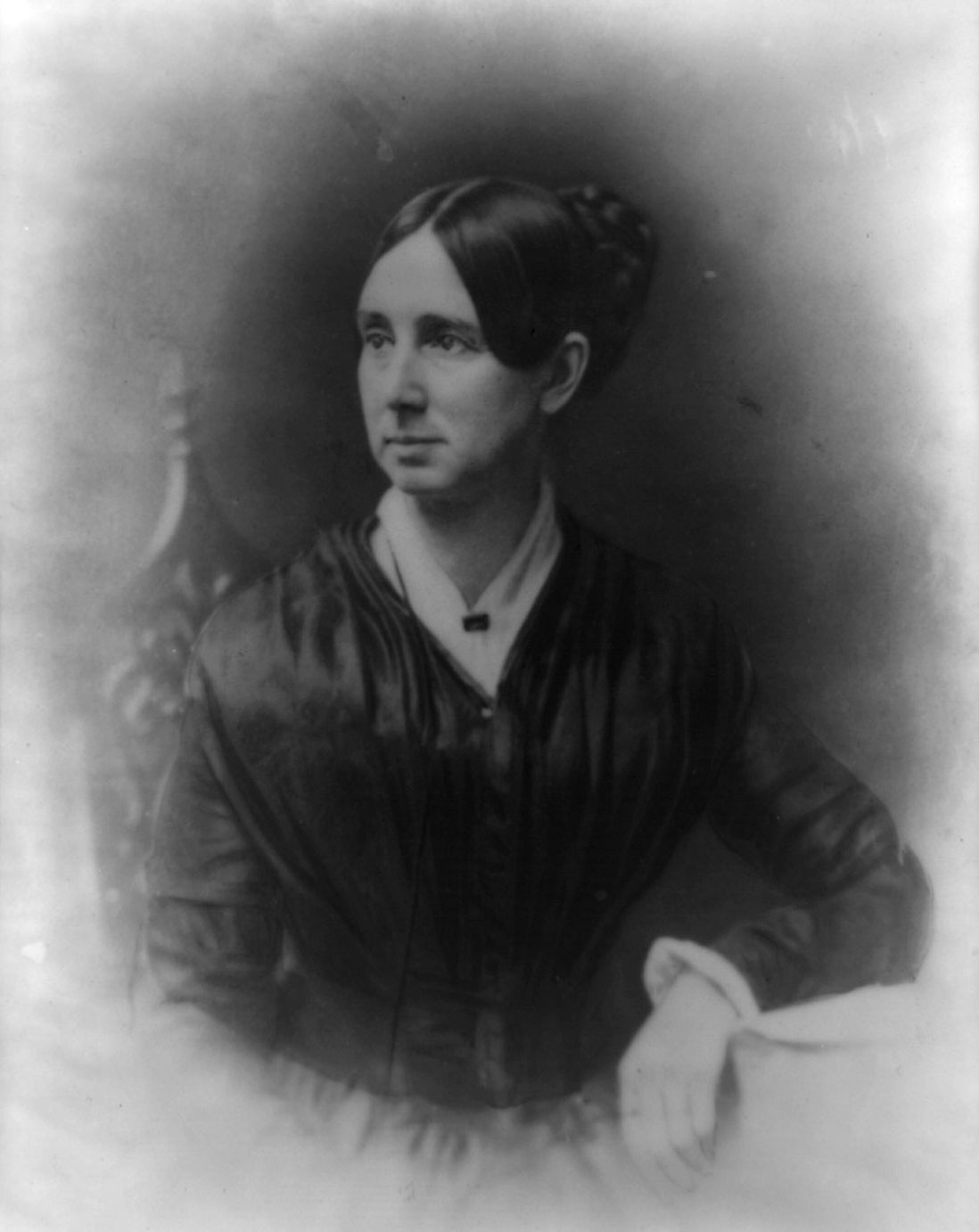
Dorothea Dix

In 1848, Dorothea Dix visited North Carolina and called for reform in the care of mentally ill patients. In 1849, when the North Carolina State Medical Society was formed, the construction of an institution in the capital, Raleigh, for the care of mentally ill patients was authorized. The hospital opened in 1856.

Edmund Strudwick served as the hospital's first superintendent during early construction and Edward Fisher, living on-site with his family, oversaw completion and opening of the hospital. In the first year, the hospital reported admitting 51 male and 39 female patients. Challenges during the first years of operation included a fire that destroyed the gasworks and an outbreak of dysentery. Accomplishments included instituting an early form of occupational therapy and constructing a system to deliver water to the hospital from Rocky Branch.

=== Civil War era ===
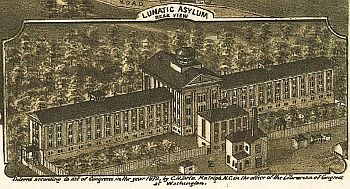
Dorothea Dix Hospital in 1872

The Civil War strained the hospital's finances due to inflation, scarcity of supplies, and reduced support from both the government and individual donations. When General Sherman's troops occupied Raleigh, Union soldiers camped on the hospital grounds, causing significant damage and depleting supplies. While the Union Army occupied Raleigh, Sherman and an aide, George Nichols, toured the hospital. During the Union occupation, the hospital also admitted Black patients for the first time. Political tensions of Reconstruction saw Fisher replaced by Eugene Grissom as superintendent in 1868.

In 1875, legislators began to relieve Dix from being the state's only hospital for the mentally ill, by creating a facility in Morganton to serve the western part of the state in Goldsboro for the Black population.

In the aftermath of a controversial trial in which key hospital employees leveled serious accusations against superintendent Grissom, he resigned and was replaced by William R. Wood in 1889. Wood was replaced by George L. Kirby, who served from 1894 until his death in 1901.

=== Early twentieth century ===
By the start of the twentieth century, the hospital had 174 acres of land under cultivation, mostly by unpaid patient labor, to reduce the hospital's food expenses.

The first two decades of the twentieth century were a period of rapid growth for the hospital, interrupted only briefly during World War I when many staff members were drafted and construction materials were scarce.

James McKee served as superintendent from 1901 to 1912. His tenure was notable for the establishment of a nursing school at the hospital and for adoption of what was known as the colony system for treatment of people with epilepsy, housing them in smaller buildings away from other patients.

The hospital's growth further accelerated during Albert Anderson's time as superintendent, 1913-1932. During this time, the hospital was influenced by the national mental hygiene movement, improved medical care of patients, and implemented precursors to what became known as occupational therapy. By 1920, the hospital housed over 1,100 patients and by 1932 it housed almost 2,000. In 1925 the hospital began to house patients who had been classified as criminally insane. It also maintained a separate ward for Native Americans.

The influenza pandemic affected 317 at the hospital, resulting in the deaths of 18 patients and 2 staff members. In 1926, a large fire damaged the main building's west wing, which housed male patients.

In 1928, Anderson faced three bills of indictment related to accusations of neglect resulting in patient deaths; to the purchase of a hospital greenhouse from a family member; and to the use of patient labor at his home, farm, and Anderson Heights real estate development. While the facts related to patient labor were confirmed, Anderson was cleared of all charges, had the support of the hospital's board, and kept his job.

=== Late twentieth century ===
From 1961 to 1982, developmental psychobiologist Gilbert Gottlieb led the hospital's research division, conducting research in ducklings on the phenomena of imprinting and species recognition. It was extremely unusual for a psychiatric hospital to house a lab conducting this type of research on naturally-occurring animal behavior. At Dix, Gottlieb's colleagues and research collaborators included Peter Witt, John Vandenbergh, Ron Oppenheim, Ted Hall and Zing-Yang Kuo.

=== Closure ===
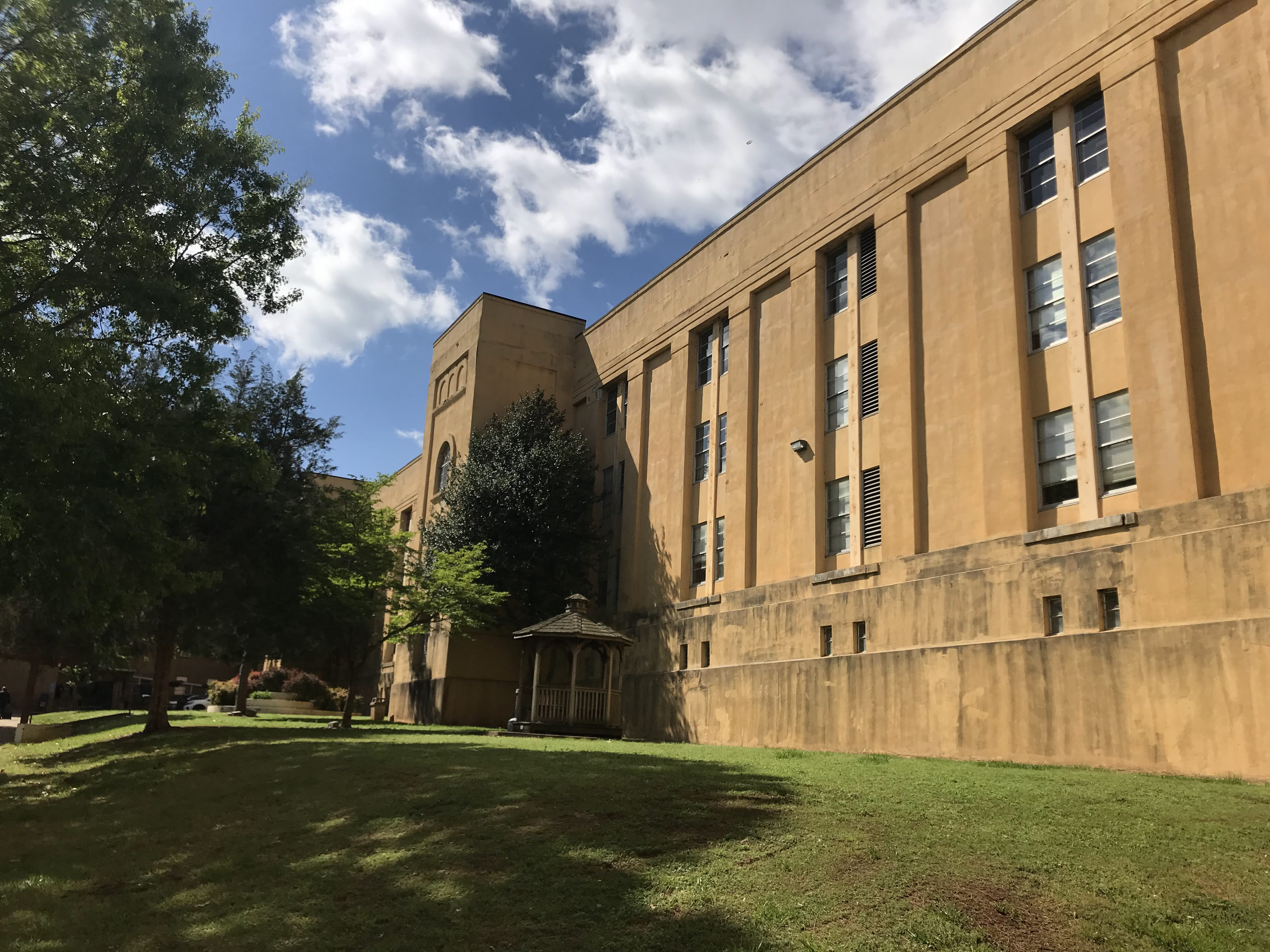
The former Dorothea Dix Hospital in Raleigh, North Carolina.

In 1980, North Carolina Secretary of Health and Human Services Sarah Taylor Morrow submitted a proposal to close Dorothea Dix Hospital and to reorganize North Carolina's mental health services.

The Public Consulting Group produced a report on North Carolina's state psychiatric hospitals and area mental health programs that was released by State Auditor Ralph Campbell Jr. on April 1, 2000. This report recommended closing Dix Hospital as it was the most expensive mental health hospital in North Carolina at that time, as renovating its existing facilities was not feasible and building new facilities would be expensive, and recommended increasing the capacity at the other three mental health hospital in North Carolina in order to compensate (Cherry Hospital and Broughton Hospital, still open, and John Umstead Hospital, now closed). These recommendations were made despite the fact that the hospital was operating well and that its closure meant that mental health patients would have no local, public facility to use for care. The hospital land was purchased by the state to house the hospital.

The Dorothea Dix Hospital was at one time slated to be closed by the state by 2008, and the fate of the remaining 306 acres (124 ha) was a matter of much discussion and debate in state and local circles. As of October 6, 2008, according to the News & Observer, state officials were calling the facility "Central Regional Hospital - Raleigh Campus". But in 2009, the state announced that Dorothea Dix Hospital would not be closing and would not be a "satellite" of CRH. It was announced in August 2010 that a lack of funding meant the facility would "shut its doors by the end of the year."

In August 2012, Dorothea Dix Hospital moved its last patients to Central Regional Hospital in Butner, North Carolina, a facility that critics said did not provide enough beds for the most serious cases. To help alleviate the situation, in May 2012, UNC agreed to spend $40 million on mental health services.

== Hospital grounds ==
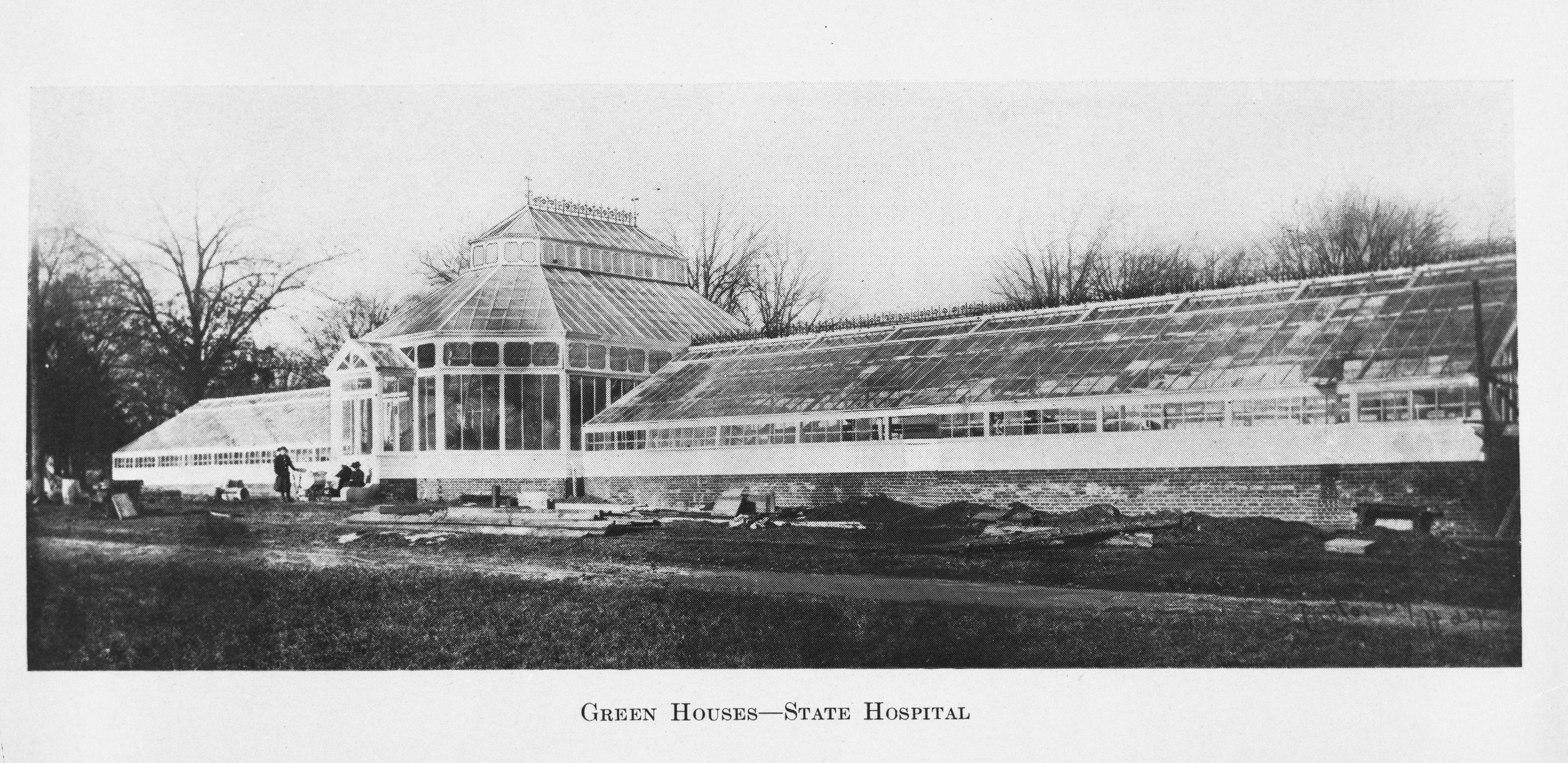
Greenhouses at the Dorothea Dix Hospital in 1914

The hospital grounds at one time included 2,354 acres (953 ha), which were used for the hospital's farms, orchards, livestock, maintenance buildings, employee housing, and park grounds.

In 1984, the Hunt administration transferred 385 acres to North Carolina State University's "Centennial Campus", and in 1985, the Martin administration transferred an additional 450 acres. Other pieces of the property now include the State Farmer's Market.

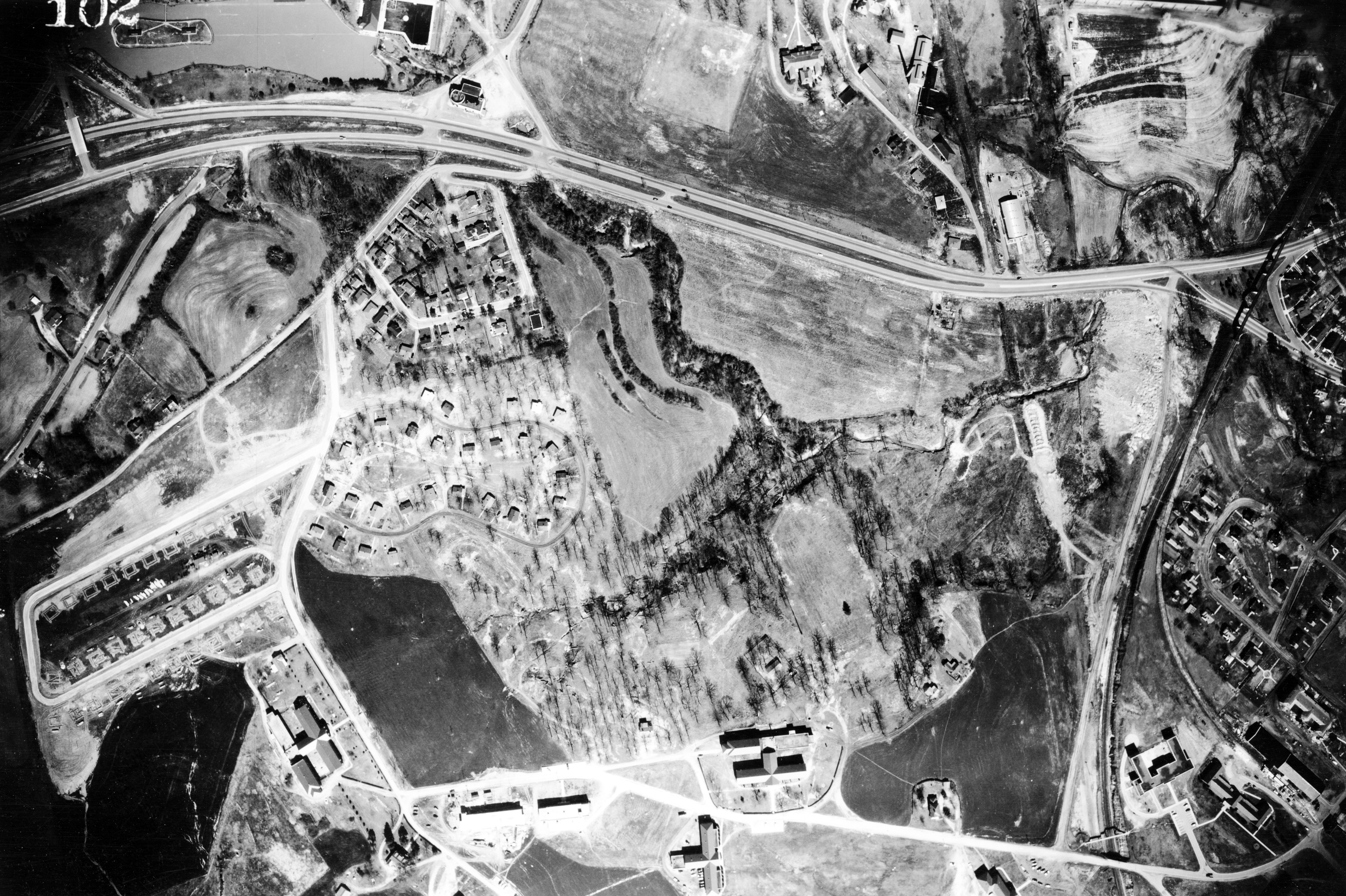
The Dorothea Dix campus photographed in c. 1954 from the air, with the Kirby-Bilyeu neighborhood near top of frame, now part of Dix Park. The hospital is just to the right of this photograph.

On May 5, 2015, the Council of State members voted unanimously to approve selling the 308 acres to the city. Proceeds of the sale were to go to "fund facilities and services for the mentally ill." Located on the property is Spring Hill, listed on the National Register of Historic Places in 1983. The property is now operated as a city park and is open to the public.

North Carolina Department of Health and Human Services maintained offices for department staff on the grounds from the 1990s to 2025.

=== Cemetery ===
A deceased patient was buried on the hospital grounds in 1859, and a cemetery for patients whose bodies remained unclaimed was soon placed at the rear of the hospital property. During the Depression, approximately 50 burials took place each year. Starting in 1943, a law allowed postmortems and autopsies to be conducted on these unclaimed bodies before burial. The last of approximately 900 burials in the Dorothea Dix Hospital Cemetery took place in 1970. An extensive restoration of the cemetery took place between 1988 and 1997, and volunteers continue to care for the 275 remaining gravesites.

== Published accounts ==
In 1935, physician Victor R. Small published an autobiography, I Knew 3000 Lunatics. While the book only identifies the state psychiatric hospital where he worked as being located in the South, huge, modern, and set on beautiful grounds, Small had worked for six years at the hospital that came to be known as Dorothea Dix. With Hardie Albright, Small also adapted the book into All the Living, A Play in Three Acts. Julian Ashby, then hospital superintendent, saw the play performed in New York in 1938 and recognized some of the patients portrayed.

A thorough history of the hospital was published in 2010 by the Office of Archives and History of the North Carolina Department of Cultural Resources.

The hospital is the setting for "Dix Hill", David Sedaris' reminiscence of working there as a volunteer in his youth, published in his essay collection Naked. The events described in the essay have been called into question.

In "'It's Not My American Dream': Working Class People Share Their Experience of Job Loss," Amanda Gunn presents a long narrative poem based on interviews with 55 working-class employees of Dorothea Dix Hospital as they prepare for its closure.

The article "Sophia Devereux Turner and the Troubled Female Mind in the Late-Nineteenth-Century South" by Sylvia D. Hoffert describes the experience of a patient committed to the "North Carolina Hospital for the Insane" [sic] in 1878 for morphine addiction and includes several poems Turner wrote while at the hospital.

The hospital features in a short story, "Mothers Day," by Ray Morrison, published in Broad River Review.

== See also ==
- Bibliography of Dorothea Dix
