= Martin W. Carr School =

- U.S. National Register of Historic Places
- U.S. Historic district – Contributing property
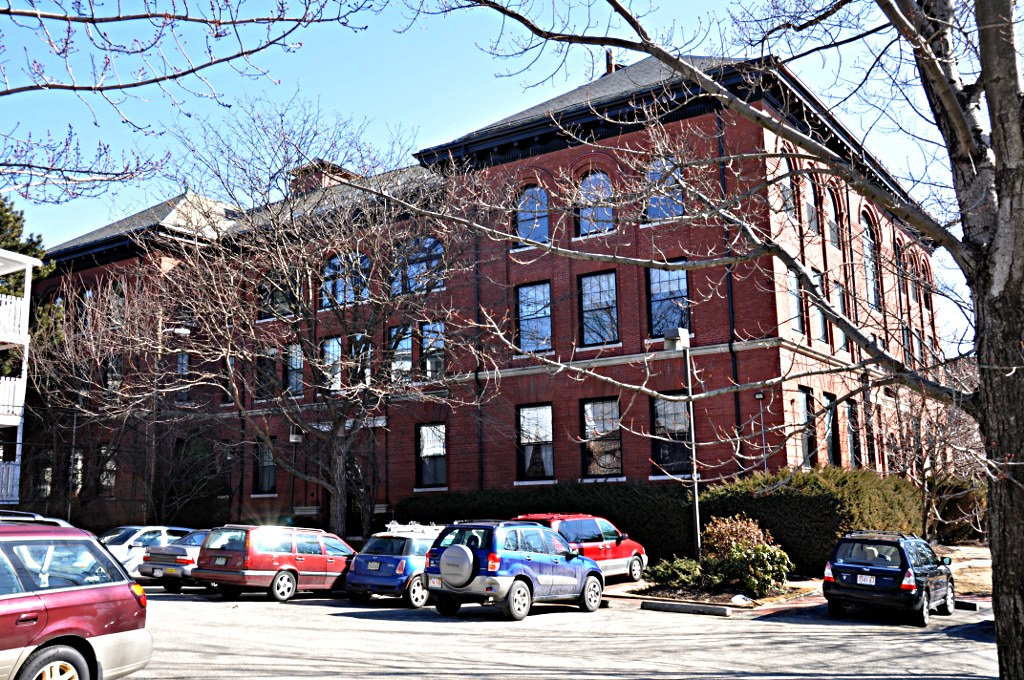

- Location within Massachusetts Location within the United States
- Location: 25 Atherton St., Somerville, Massachusetts
- Coordinates: 42°23′05″N 71°06′26″W
- Area: less than one acre
- Built: 1898
- Architect: Aaron H. Gould
- Architectural style: Colonial Revival, Renaissance
- Part of: Spring Hill Historic District (ID89001222)
- NRHP reference No.: 84002530

Significant dates
- Added to NRHP: July 5, 1984
- Designated CP: September 18, 1989

The Martin W. Carr School is a historic school building located at 25 Atherton Street, in the Spring Hill area of Somerville, Massachusetts. Built in 1898, it is a prominent local example of Colonial and Renaissance Revival architecture, and the only known surviving work of local architect Aaron H. Gould. It served the local neighborhood as a school until 1980, and was subsequently converted into condominiums. It was listed on the National Register of Historic Places in 1984.

== Description and history ==
The Martin W. Carr School is located in Spring Hill, one of Somerville's oldest residential subdivisions, at the junction of Atherton and Beech Streets. Its lot extends northward to also abut Cleveland Street. It is a four-story H-shaped brick building, built in 1898 as an elementary school with fourteen classrooms. It was named in honor of Martin W. Carr, a successful Somerville manufacturer who was active in city government serving over the years as alderman, city councilor, and member of the school committee. Carr's factory, in buildings now converted to lofts in Davis Square, manufactured jewelry, novelties, and metal ware. The handsome school building was built of red brick in the Renaissance Revival style to a design by Aaron Gould. Gould was then a prominent local architect who designed a number of significant public buildings, of which none but this now survive.

The City of Somerville closed the Carr School in 1980. The building was sold to a developer who converted it to residential use in 1997. It was initially a rental building and subsequently converted to condos. Today there are 20 condominiums in the Carr School. There are studios, one-bedrooms, and two-bedroom condos on three floors plus a lower level.

The Carr School is located across Atherton Street from one of Somerville's most unusual architectural landmarks, the Round House.

== See also ==
- National Register of Historic Places listings in Somerville, Massachusetts
