= PCG =

The initials PCG are used for:

== Organizations ==
- Pacific Century Group, Asia-based investment company
- Pacific Corporate Group, investment company in California, US
- Pacific Gas and Electric Company (stock symbol)
- Pakistan Coast Guards, a Pakistani maritime law enforcement agency
- Pentecostal Church of God
- People's Consultative Group, a group mediating disputes between India and the United Liberation Front of Assam
- Philadelphia Church of God
- Philippine Coast Guard
- Police Coast Guard of the Singapore Police Force
- Popular Combatants Group, an insurgent group in Ecuador
- Positive Montenegro, a former Montenegrin political party
- Professional Contractors Group of UK freelance workers
- Public Consulting Group

== Science and technology ==
- Penicillin G, an antibiotic used to treat a number of bacterial infections
- Permuted congruential generator, a pseudo-random number generation algorithm
- Phonocardiogram, a recording of heart sounds
- Polycomb-group proteins, a group of regulatory proteins which remodel chromatin to silence other genes
- Preconditioned conjugate gradient method, an algorithm for the numerical solution of particular systems of linear equations
- Procedural content generation (or generator), a method of producing a constrained artifact whose attributes are precisely unknown (and essentially random) but within desirable ranges
- Programming/Code Golf, a board on Stack Exchange dedicated to code golf

== Other uses ==
- The Poetae Comici Graeci, a comprehensive reference work of ancient Greek comedy
- Parent company guarantee, a contract provision regarding subsidiary contractors
- Plan Comptable Général, generally accepted accounting principles in France
