= Spring Hill Cemetery =

Spring Hill Cemetery may refer to:

- Spring Hill Cemetery (Easton, Maryland)
- Spring Hill Cemetery (Huntington, West Virginia)
- Spring Hill Cemetery (Marlborough, Massachusetts)
- Spring Hill Cemetery (Nashville, Tennessee)
- Spring Hill Cemetery Historic District, in Charleston, West Virginia

== See also ==
- Spring Hill (disambiguation)
