= Dix Park =

Urban park in Raleigh, North Carolina

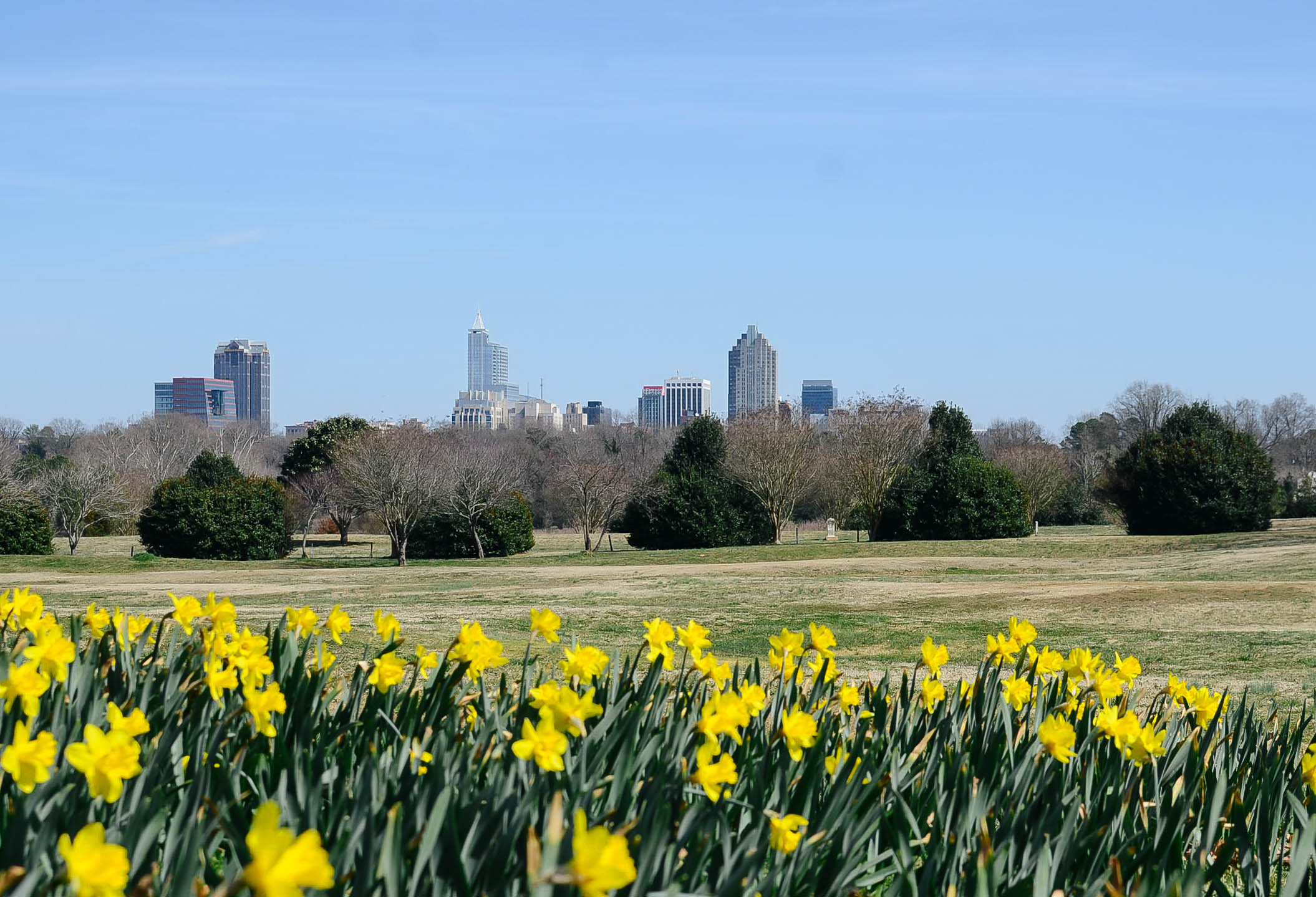
- The Raleigh skyline from Dorothea Dix park
- Interactive map of Dix Park
- Location: Raleigh, North Carolina
- Coordinates: 35°46′15″N 78°39′37″W

Dix Park (sometimes referred to as Dorothea Dix Park) is a large urban park in Raleigh, North Carolina, located about a mile southwest of downtown Raleigh. It covers 308 acres (1.25 km^{2}) that were formerly part of the Dorothea Dix Hospital grounds, including a 2.5 acre grass dog park and a 5 acre sunflower field that blooms in July. In 2025, USA Today readers ranked it as the tenth best city park in the United States.

It is located near just south of the historic Boylan Heights neighborhood and east of the Centennial Campus of North Carolina State University, and is located between the Rocky Branch creek (to the north) and the Walnut Creek (to the south).

== History ==
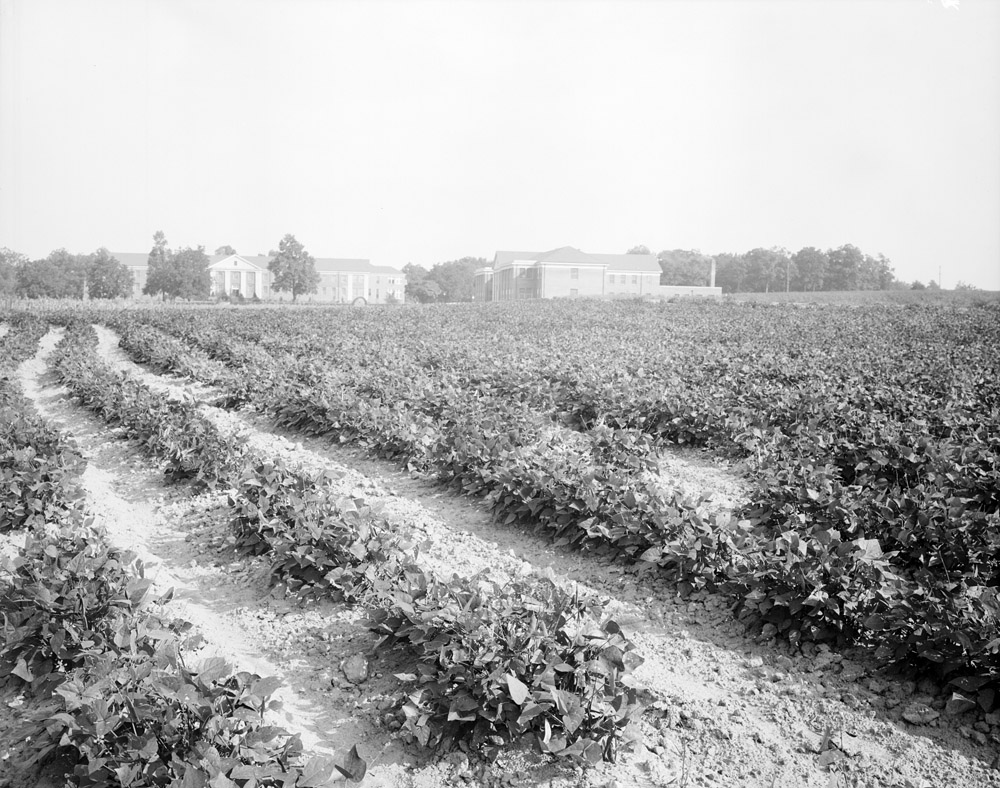
Dorothea Dix Park was built on the lands surrounding the Dorothea Dix Hospital, seen here c. 1940

The Dix Hill / Dorothea Dix Hospital site was added to the National Register of Historic Places in 1990.

The North Carolina legislature created the Dorothea Dix Property Study Commission in 2003 to explore options for the hospital site after its closure, at that time planned for 2007. The suggestion to use the site as a park was first made at a public forum on February 9, 2004. In August, 2004 community organizations and individuals formed Friends of Dorothea Dix Park. In 2006, a group of affluent donors formed Dix Visionaries to support creation of the park. In 2007, a grassroots campaign called Dix 306 called for the full 306 acres to be used for the park.

On December 4, 2012, the North Carolina Council of State and the Raleigh City Council approve a plan for Raleigh to lease the Dix campus from the state. On December 28, nearing the end of her term as Governor, Bev Perdue and Raleigh Mayor Nancy McFarlane sign the lease. By March, 2013, Republicans in the North Carolina Senate had passed a bill voiding the lease. It did not pass in the House, but did reopen negotiation around the terms of the lease.

In 2015, after extensive negotiations, Governor Pat McCrory and Mayor McFarlane announce they have reached a new deal, in which Raleigh will purchase the Dix property for $52 million. The City of Raleigh purchased the land from the State of North Carolina in July of 2015, and in 2018 Raleigh released the final master plan and opened the park to the public for recreational use. By 2025, the city had already demolished 25 buildings on the site, totaling about 50,000 square feet. Demolition of some larger buildings is planned for 2026.

== Points of interest ==
=== Dorothea Dix Hospital ===
Several buildings from the historic psychiatric hospital, including the newly renovated Stone Houses, remain on the park grounds.

Dorothea Dix Hospital Cemetery

In operation between 1859 and 1970, the three-acre cemetery contains approximately 900 graves of patients who died at the hospital. Little was known about most of the people buried here. In 1991, work began to identify these patients and install new grave markers. With extensive help from volunteers, almost 800 people have been identified.

=== Gipson Play Plaza ===
The 18.5-acre Gipson Play Plaza officially opened June 6, 2025 at the park's Lake Wheeler Road entrance. Designed by Michael Van Valkenburgh Associates and with play equipment from Germany's Richter Spielgeräte, and constructed by Balfour Beatty - Holt Brothers Construction, a Joint Venture, the park took three years to complete. Namesake donors Tom and Pat Gipson provided $10 million for the $70 million project, with additional funds from a 2022 Raleigh bond measure. The plaza was intentionally designed for intergenerational and disability-accessible use. The play plaza includes the following distinctive features:

- The House of Many Porches market and cafe in a newly-renovated building from Dorothea Dix Hospital's earliest days.
- Multiple interactive water features including a system of pulleys and levels that allow children to learn about the historic Yates Mill.

=== Greg Poole, Jr. All Faiths Chapel ===
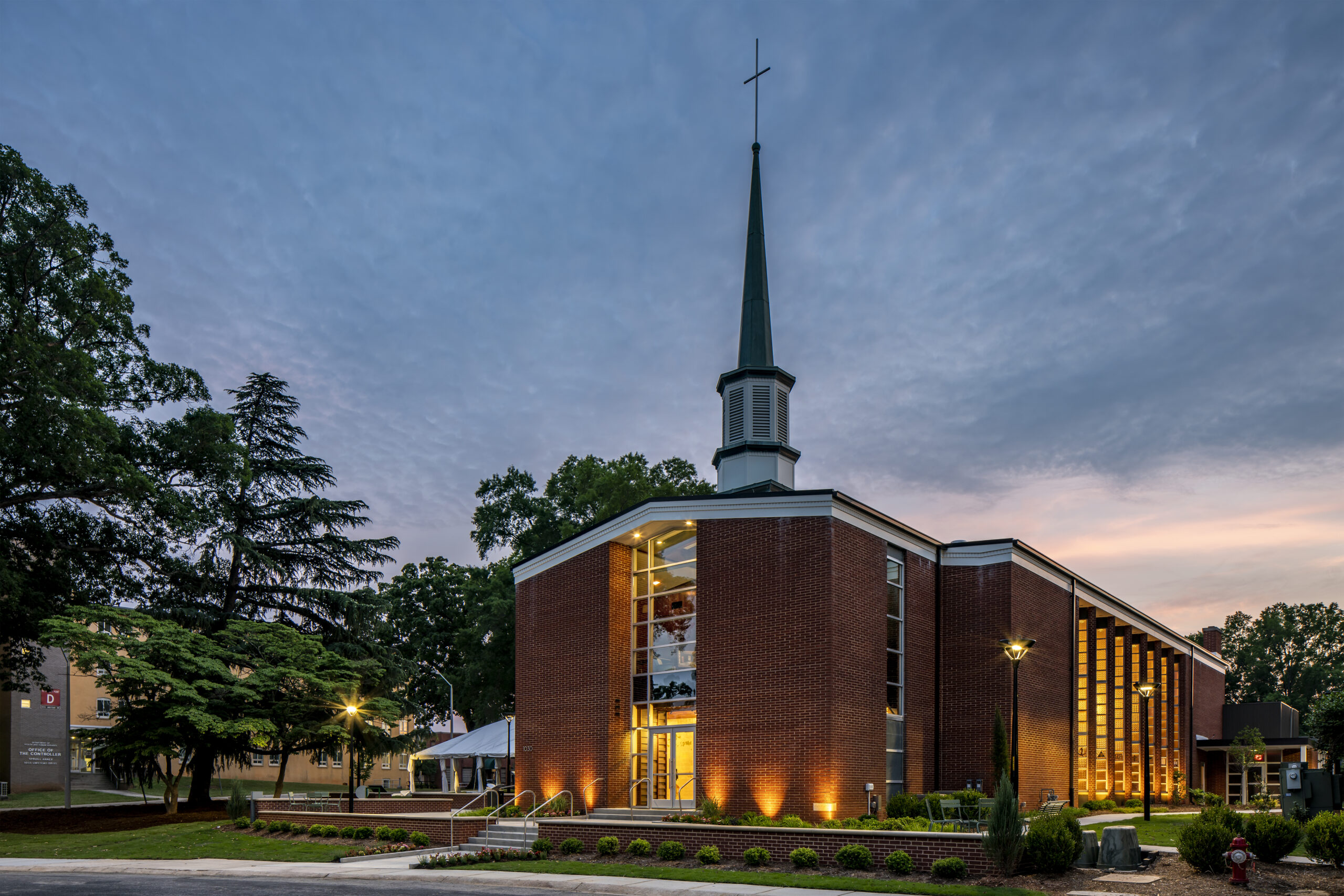
Greg Poole, Jr. All Faiths Chapel in 2021

Built in 1955 and renovated in 2020, the chapel offers midcentury modern architecture and both indoor and outdoor event space. The chapel is named for Greg Poole, Jr., a local businessman whose advocacy and vision were influential in converting the hospital site into Dix Park.

=== Spring Hill Plantation ===
Spring Hill House and the accompanying historic marker are located on the park grounds.

=== Sunflower Field ===
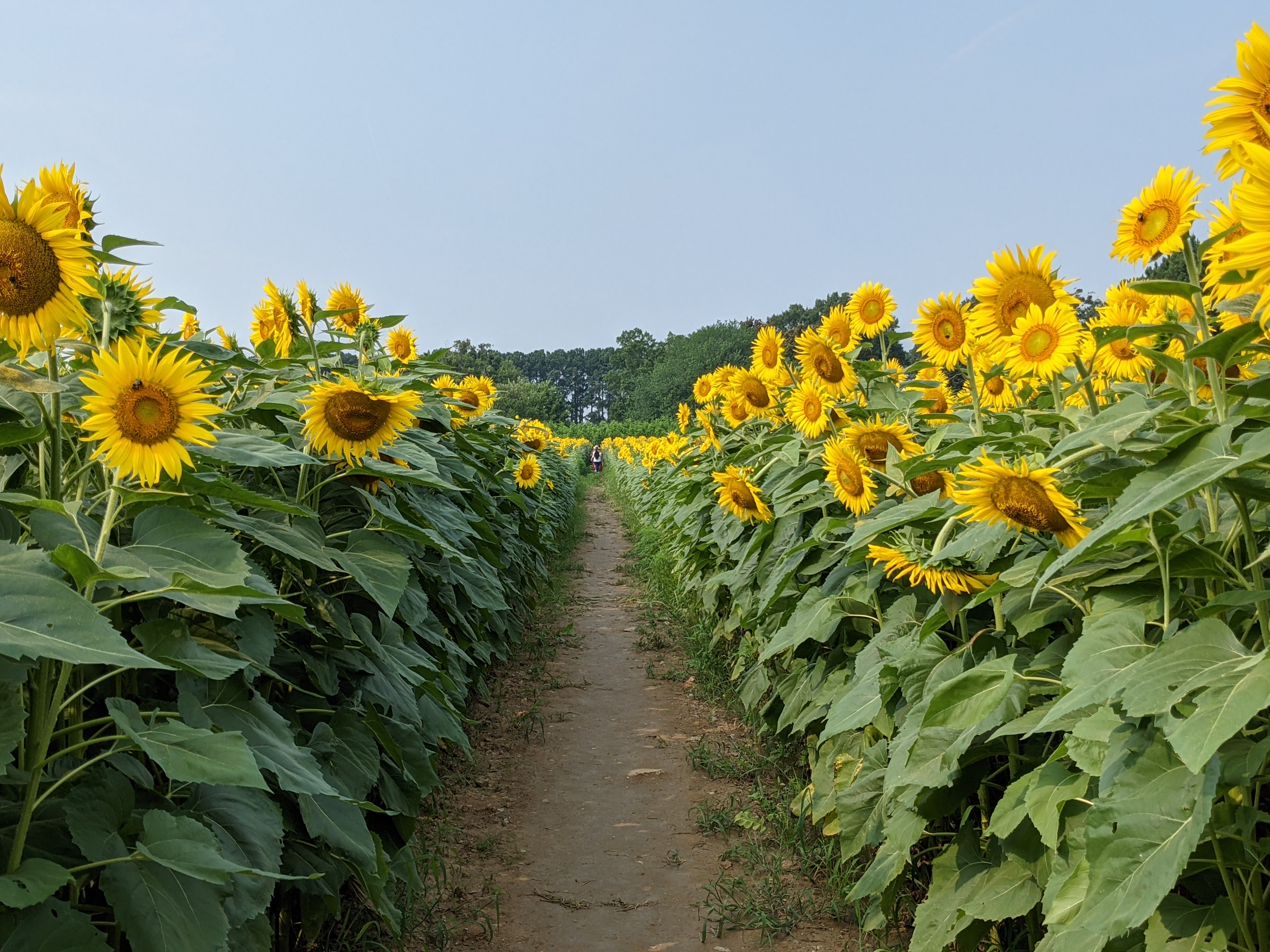
The sunflower field at Dix Park in July 2025.

The Sunflower Field was first planted in 2019 in Dix Park by the Raleigh Water Department as a "environmental experiment": after planting a field of sunflowers in order to harvest their seeds as biofuel the previous year, they decided to plant them in a park so that they could be enjoyed by the public. Since then, around 200,000 sunflower seeds are planted every year and timed to bloom simultaneously in mid-July. This simultaneous bloom is a popular attraction. As the flowers die, they also provide food for many species of birds including goldfinches, nuthatches, titmice, grosbeaks, chestnut warbler, Mississippi Kites, cedar waxwings, the scarlet tanager and a single painted bunting in 2022 -- which in turn attracts birdwatchers to watch the birds.

=== Sunflower Power Poles ===
Artist Thomas Sayre's transformation of power poles at the park's entrance into sunflower sculptures reflects the public's enthusiasm for the Sunflower Field in addition to transforming utilitarian infrastructure owned by Duke Energy.

=== Trolls ===
A family of five trolls, commissioned by international artist Thomas Dambo were installed at Dix park in 2025. They were created by Danbo and assembled by the artist and a team of local volunteers. Each troll is made from recycled materials such as old pallets, recycled wood fencing and twigs. Each of the trolls can be located on a map of the park, and each has a story included in their entry on the map. Mother Strong Tail, Dix, Dax, Dux and Daddy Bird Eye are part of a family of trolls, the other two (Little Sally & Big Pete) of whom are on walkabout in High Point and Charlotte.

== Events ==
=== Inter-Tribal Pow Wow ===
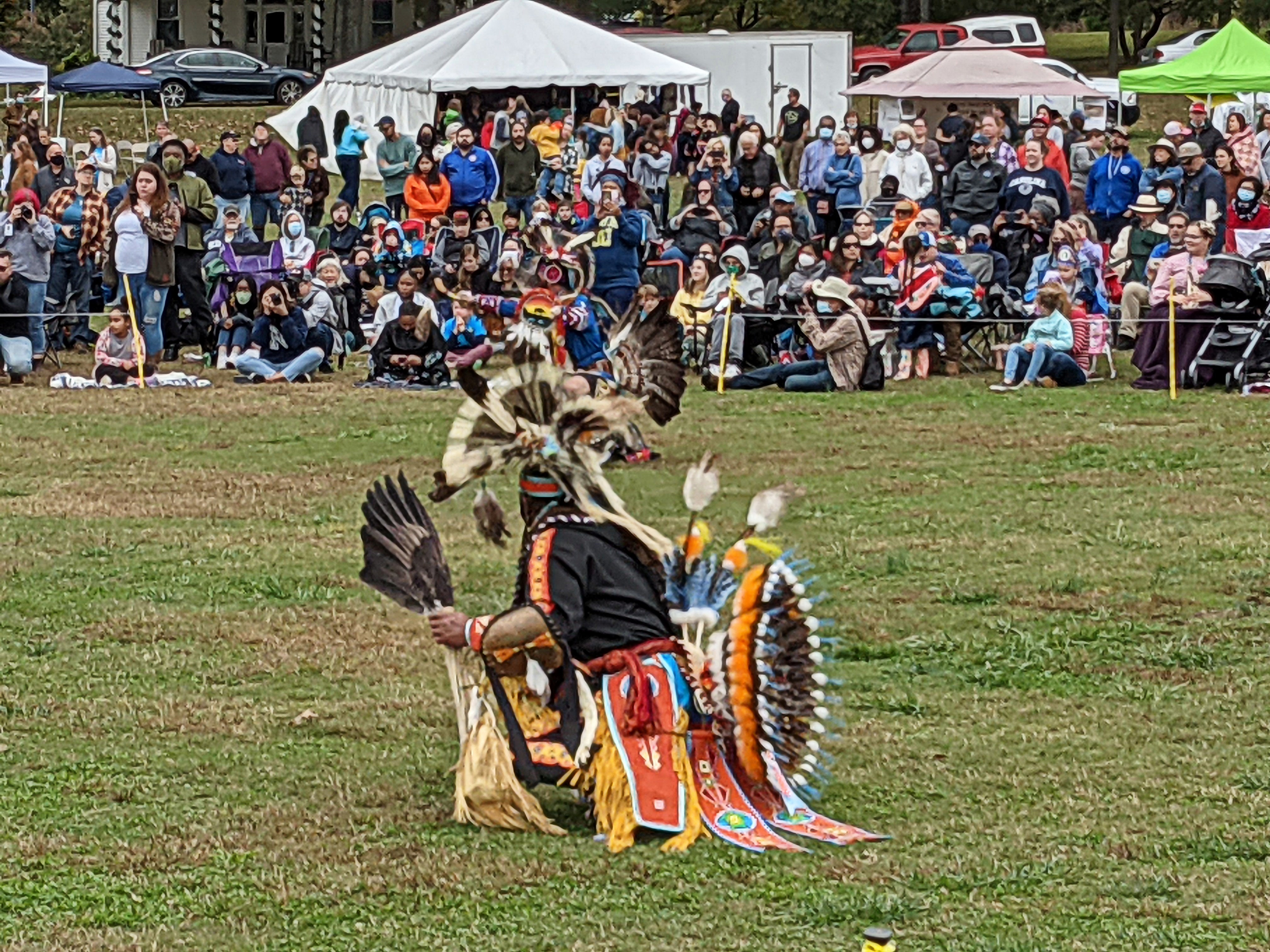
Dix Park Inter-Tribal Pow Wow in October 2021

The Dix Park Inter-Tribal Pow Wow is an annual event that recognizes the ancestral ties of the Coharie Intra-tribal Council, Inc., Eastern Band of Cherokee Indians, Haliwa-Saponi Indian Tribe, Lumbee Tribe of North Carolina, Meherrin Indian Tribe, Occaneechi Band of the Saponi Nation, Sappony and Waccamaw Siouan Indians to the land. The city held its first native land blessing and acknowledgment ceremony in 2020, followed by the inaugural pow wow in 2021. Canceled in 2024, the event returned in 2025 with music, dance, and cultural programming organized in partnership with the City of Raleigh’s Office of Equity and Inclusion and tribal representatives.

=== WRAL Nights of Lights ===
From 2020 through 2022, the Park hosted the WRAL Nights of Lights, a 1.3-mile drive-through holiday light experience produced by Capitol Broadcasting Company in partnership with the City of Raleigh. The event featured themed light displays, a 250-foot illuminated tunnel, and special nights for bicycles and pedestrians. The festival drew tens of thousands of visitors and included a charity 5K run and walk. The Nights of Lights event was paused after 2022 while organizers evaluated future plans for its location.

=== Dreamville Festival ===
The Dreamville Festival was a two-day music and cultural event founded by Fayetteville native and Grammy Award-winning artist J. Cole. First held at the Park in April 2019, the festival grew into one of the largest annual music gatherings in the Southeast, attracting tens of thousands of visitors from across the country. The event features hip-hop, R&B, and soul performances from major national artists and has had a significant economic impact on the Raleigh area, generating more than $145 million between 2019 and 2023. Organizers announced that the 2025 festival would be the last under the Dreamville title and management.

=== Falling for Local ===
Falling for Local is a fall festival and market held annually at Dorothea Dix Park to showcase local food, music, and small businesses. Organized by Shop Local Raleigh, the event features craft beer, hayrides, a pumpkin patch, and vendor booths representing more than 150 North Carolina makers. Originally launched in 2019, *Falling for Local* continues to attract thousands of attendees each autumn.

=== Destination SunFest ===
In 2019, Destination SunFest was held at the Park to celebrate the blooming of the park’s sunflower field. Featuring live music, food trucks, rides, and activities organized by the City of Raleigh and Dix Park Conservancy. It drew thousands of visitors to the park’s Big Field for a day of outdoor recreation and celebration.

=== Destination Dix Festival ===
The first large-scale community celebration at the Park, Destination Dix, took place in July 2016 following the City of Raleigh’s purchase of the property from the state. The festival drew more than 50,000 attendees and featured live music, food trucks, family activities, and panoramic views of downtown Raleigh’s skyline.

=== Community concerts and film nights ===
Dix Park regularly hosts outdoor concerts, food truck rodeos, and seasonal movie nights organized by the City of Raleigh’s Parks, Recreation, and Cultural Resources Department. These free, family-friendly events often take place on the park’s Big Field and draw residents for live performances and open-air film screenings.

== Awards ==
In 2025, Dix Park received three Sir Walter Raleigh Awards from the City of Raleigh Design Review Commission. The Stone Houses won in the historic preservation category; Gipson Play Plaza received the Impact Award for "projects that make a lasting impact on the city's growth, design, and vitality", and the Sunflower Poles were recognized in a special Iconic Installations category.

== Gallery ==
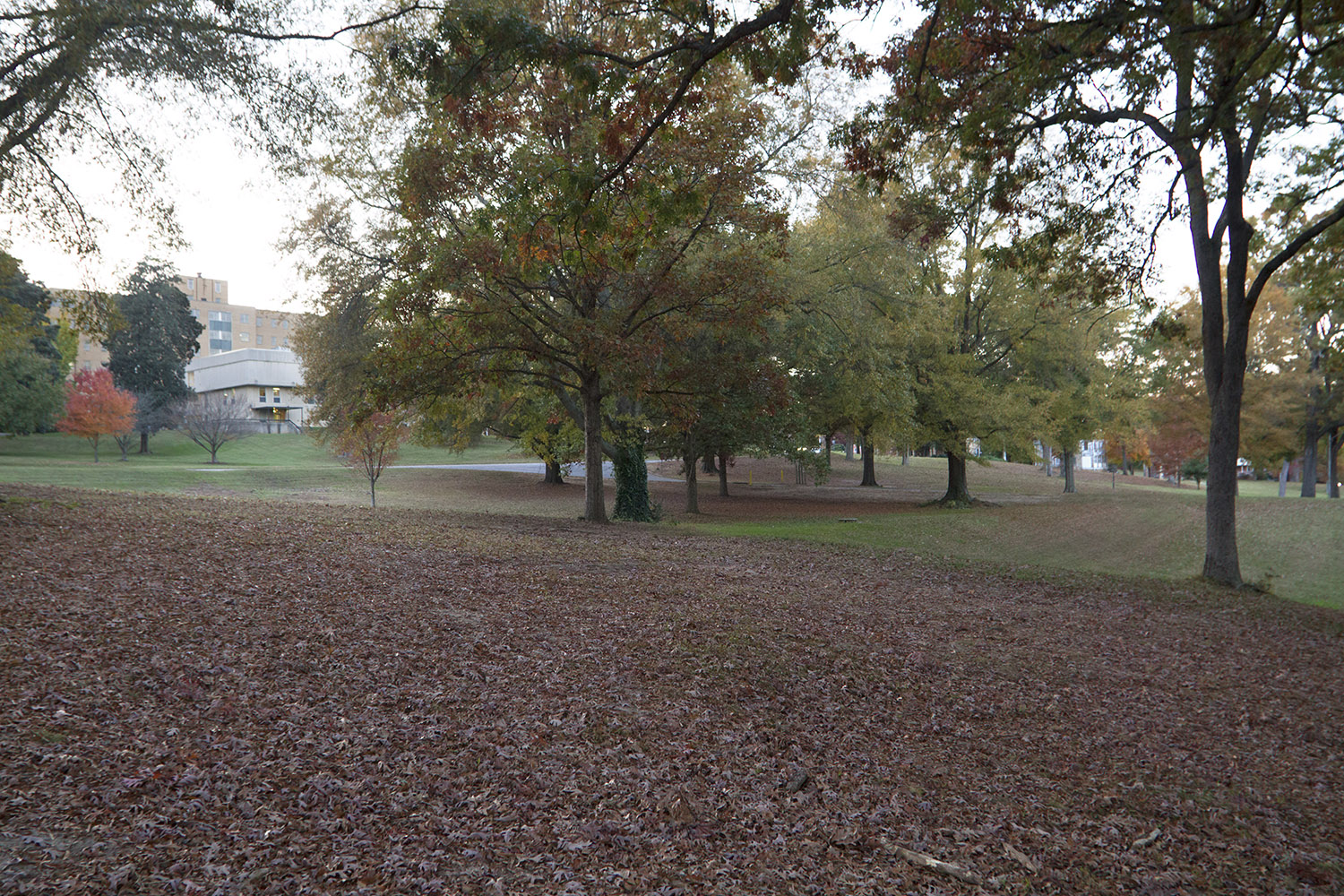
Dix Park view in November with fall colors and fallen leaves.

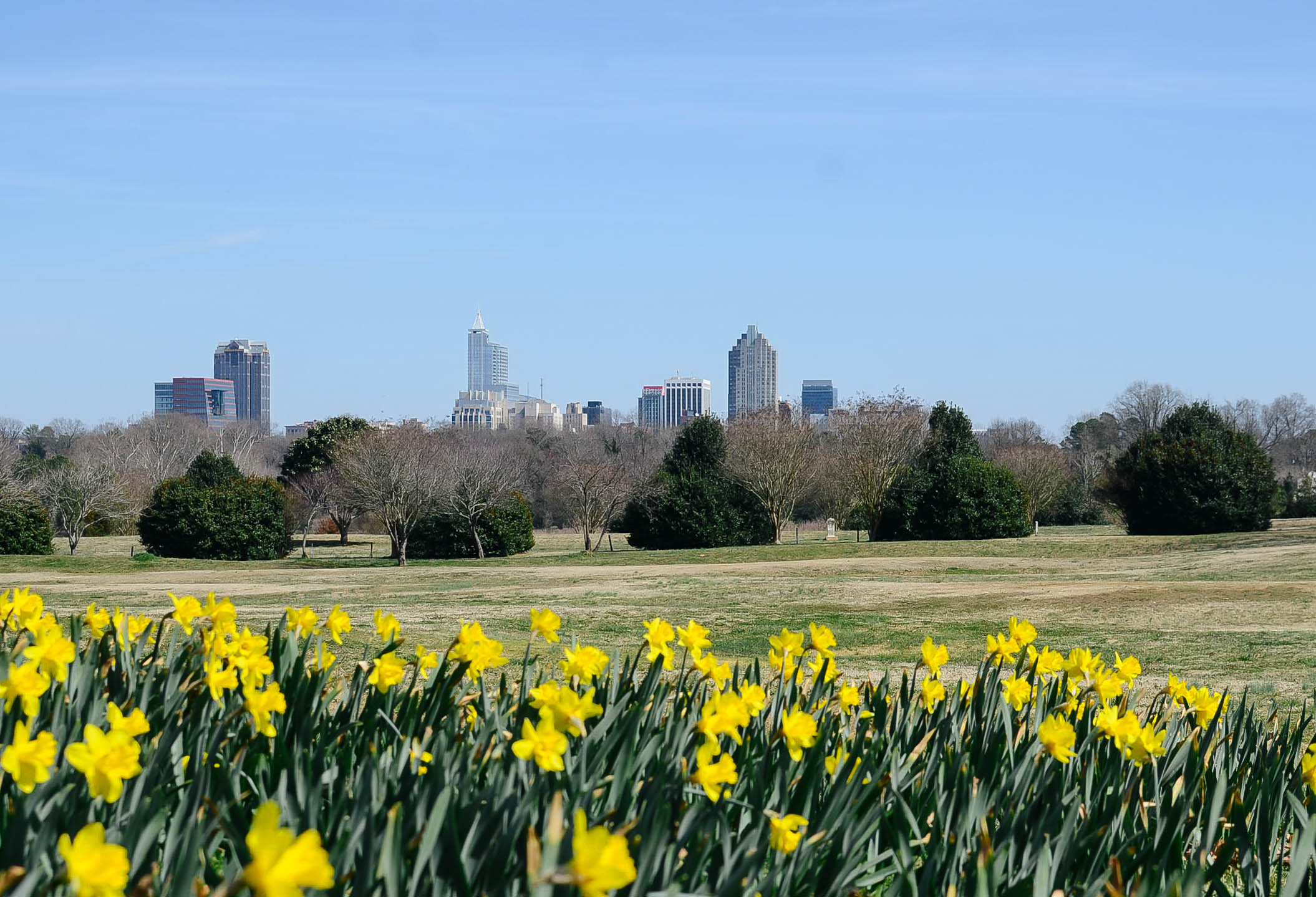
Downtown Raleigh skyline seen from Dix Park.

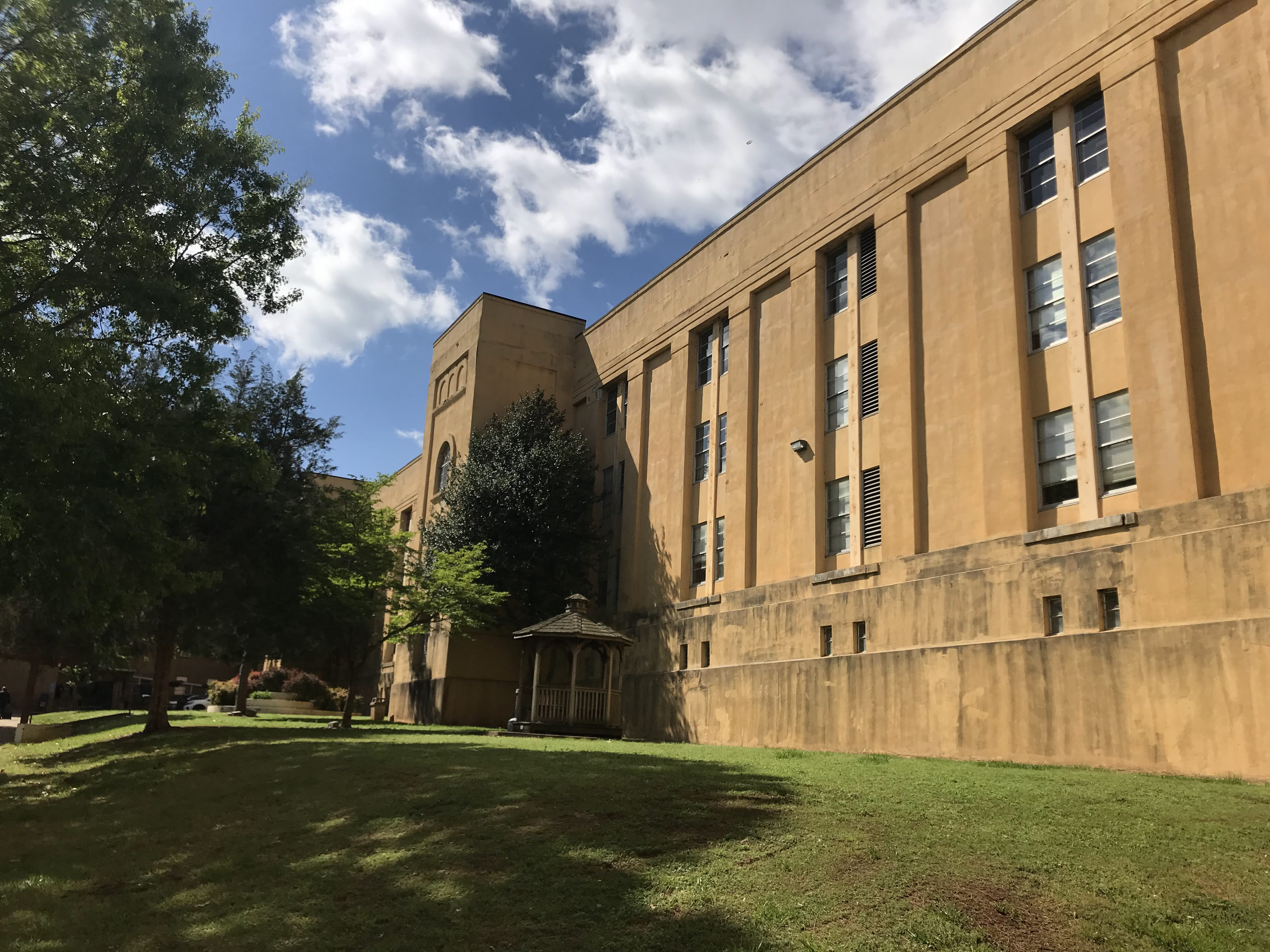
Dorothea Dix Hospital building.

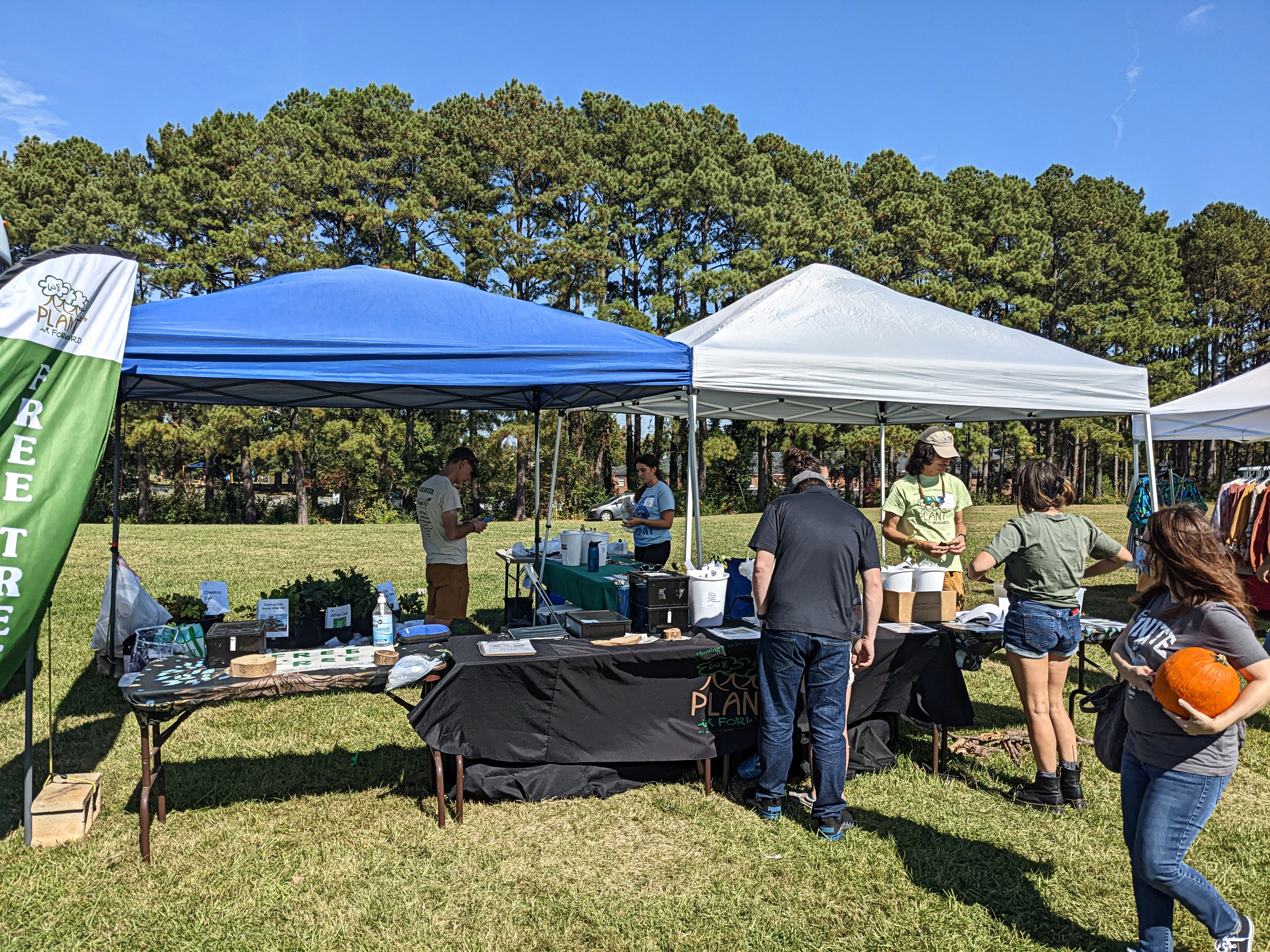
"We Plant it Forward" tree giveaway in 2022.

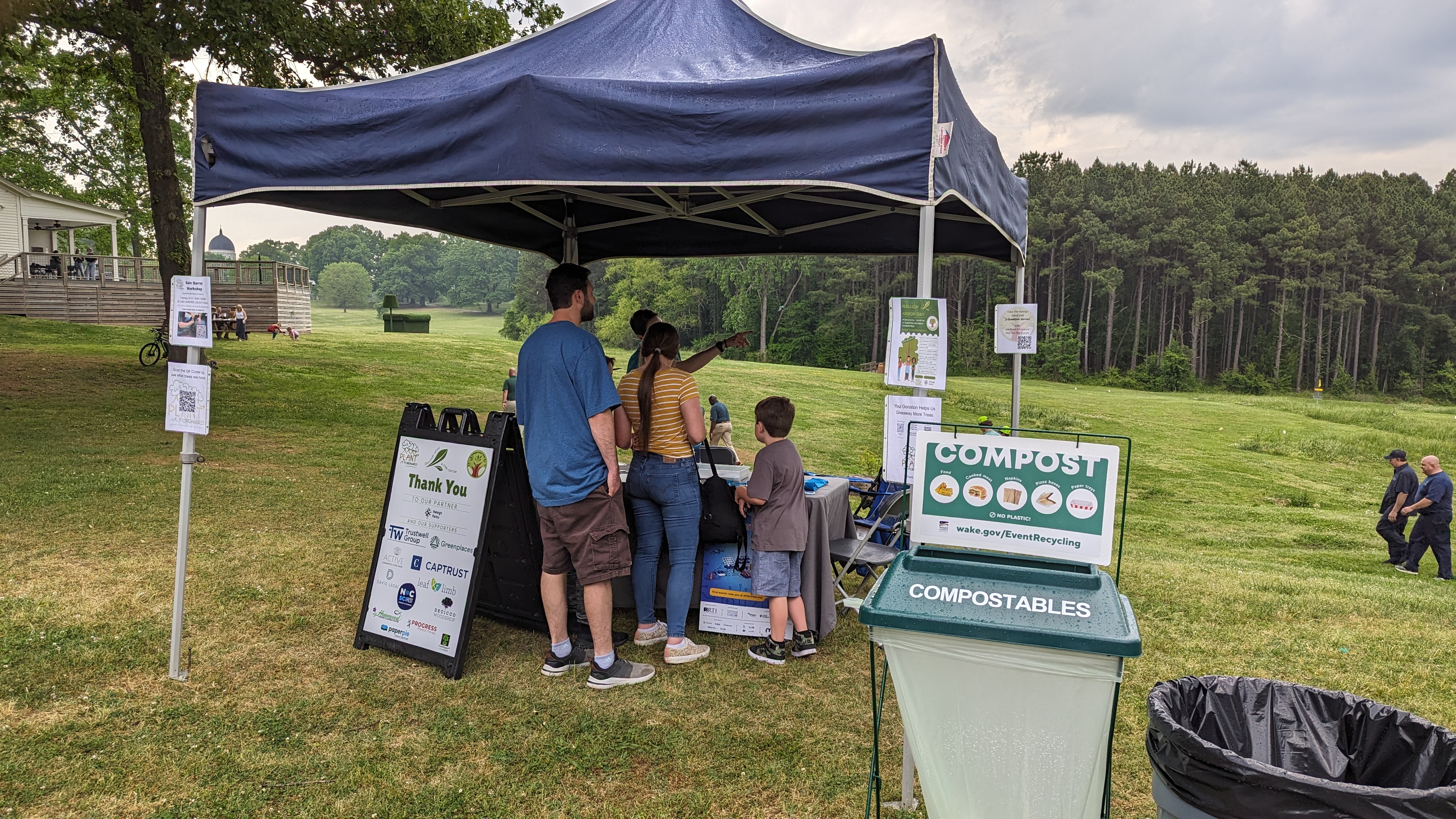
"We Plant it Forward" Arbor Day booth in 2024.
