= Wing Fort House =

Historic house in Massachusetts

- U.S. National Register of Historic Places
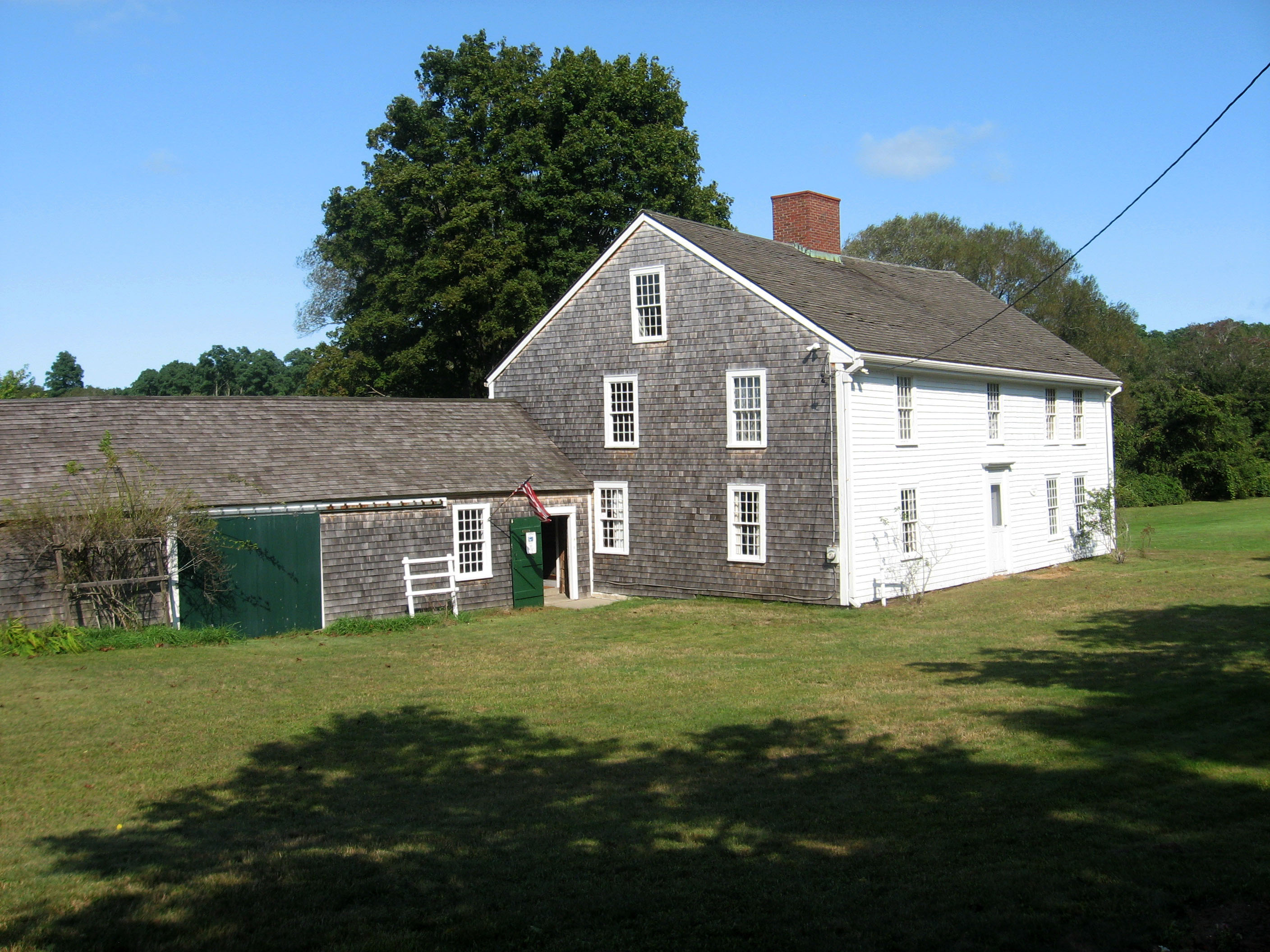
- The house in 2013

- Location within Cape Cod Location within Massachusetts Location within the United States
- Location: East Sandwich, Massachusetts
- Coordinates: 41°45′3″N 70°27′56″W
- Built: 1641
- NRHP reference No.: 76000227
- Added to NRHP: June 3, 1976

Wing Fort House is a historic house at Spring Hill Road in East Sandwich, Massachusetts, located within the Spring Hill Historic District. It was built in 1641 and added to the National Register of Historic Places in 1976.

The Wing Fort House is recognized as the oldest home in New England continuously owned by the same family. Stephen Wing, son of the Rev. John Wing, either purchased the homestead from the town of Sandwich, or the town granted him the property, around the time of his first marriage in 1646. His descendants continued to live in the home until 1942, when the last resident (Miss Cora M. Wing) sold the home to the Wing Family of America, Inc.

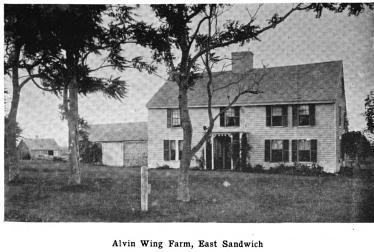
An 1898 photograph of the house

Tradition states that the home was a fort to protect the earliest settlers from the Indians. The exterior of the "Old Fort" Room (which is the oldest part of the current structure) is composed of a double wall, which may have been filled in at one time. The Cape Indians were found to be friendly, and the town did not need any fort for protection.

In 2007, dendrochronological was attempted to date the building, but it was unsuccessful due to "many of the samples having too many narrow rings, some having too few rings, and to the lack of reference chronologies from the south-eastern part of Massachusetts."

The Fort House is now a museum, privately operated by the Wing Family of America, Inc. It is located at 69 Spring Hill Road (off of Route 6a), East Sandwich, Massachusetts. The museum is open Tuesday through Saturday from June 15 to September 30 from 10:00 a.m. to 4:00 p.m. and by appointment during the remainder of the year. There is a small admission fee.

== See also ==
- First Period houses in Massachusetts (1620–1659)
- List of the oldest buildings in Massachusetts
- National Register of Historic Places listings in Barnstable County, Massachusetts
