= Springhill High School =

Springhill High School may refer to these schools:

- Springhill High School (Nova Scotia), in Canada
- Springhill High School (Rochdale), in England
- Springhill High School (Louisiana), in the United States

== See also ==
- Spring Hill High School (disambiguation)
