= Rita the Rock Planter =

Wooden sculpture in Colorado, USA

- Rita the Troll
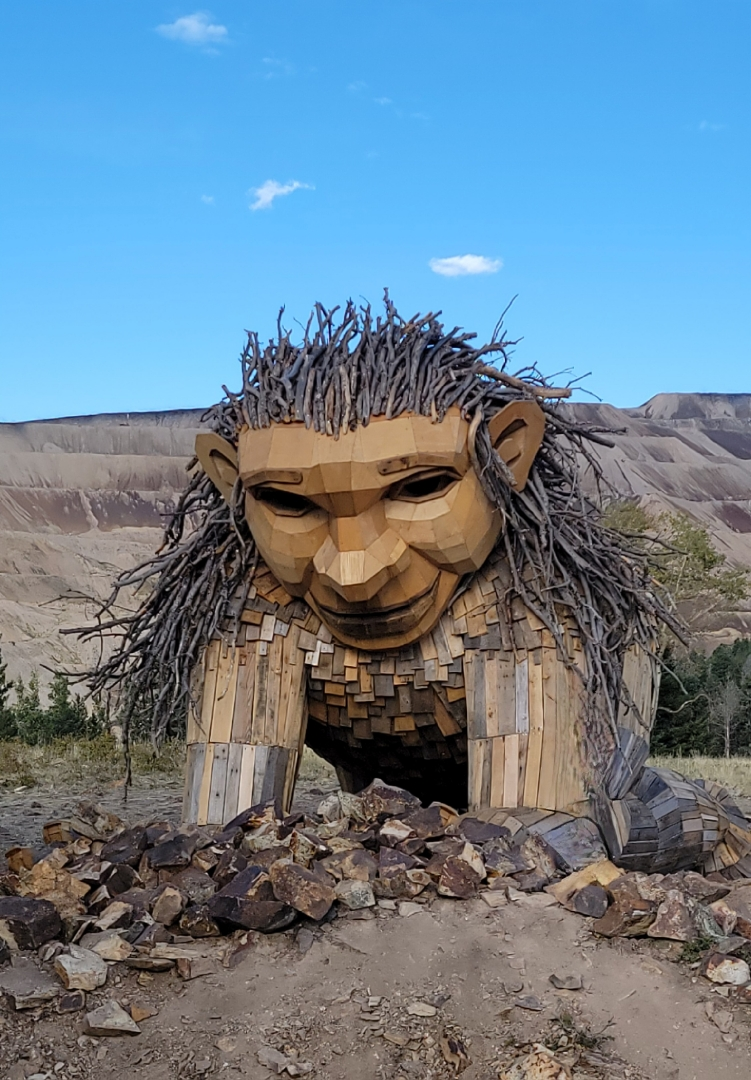
- Artist: Thomas Dambo
- Completion date: 2023
- Subject: modern mythological creature
- Condition: new
- Location: Victor, Colorado
- Coordinates: 38.709187°N 105.172562°W

Rita the Rock Planter also known as Rita the Troll is a giant wooden sculpture in Victor, Colorado. It is made up entirely of recycled wood by sculpture artist Thomas Dambo.
