= Thomas Dambo =

Danish sculptor artist

- Born: September 9, 1979 (age 47)
- Children: 2

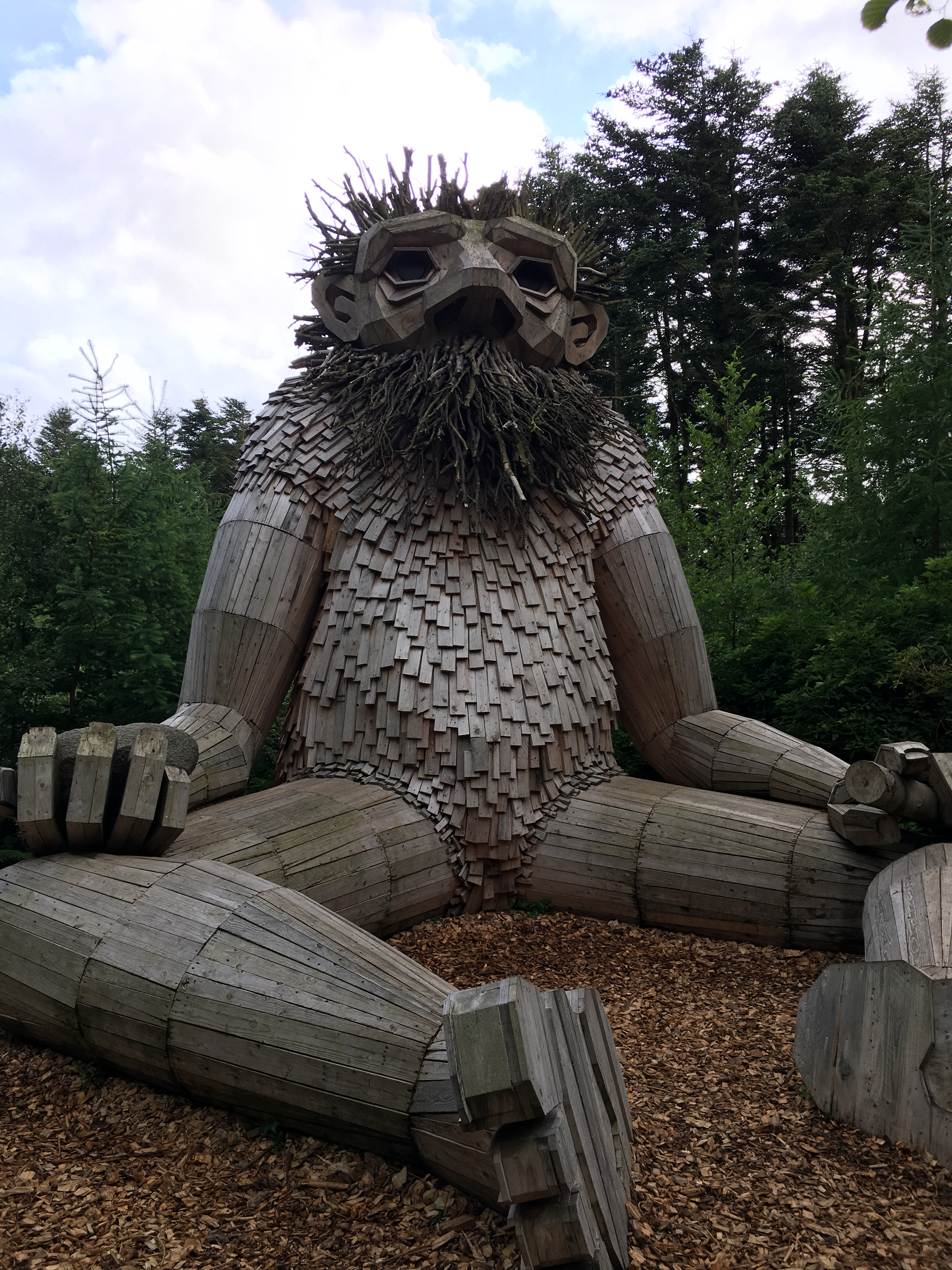
Sculpture by Dambo

Thomas Dambo is a Danish sculpture artist. He is known for his installations of giant wooden sculptures made out of recycled materials called trolls.

== Personal life ==
Dambo was born in 1979 to his mother, a theater costume seamstress, and his father, a blacksmith. He grew up in Denmark, where he was frequently exposed to troll legends. As a child, he enjoyed spending time in nature. He built treehouses, dug caves, and put up zip lines in the woods.

Dambo is based in Copenhagen. He is married and has twin sons. He has ADHD.

He is also a musician and songwriter, and had a decade-long musical career in Denmark.

== Art ==
Dambo attended Design School Kolding.

Dambo's art centers on sculptures made out of recycled materials. He has created birdhouses, trolls, and installation pieces from reclaimed wood and plastic.

== Trail of a Thousand Trolls ==
In the early 2010s, Dambo began the "Trail of a Thousand Trolls" project, which aims to build a thousand trolls from recycled materials. His first troll, "Hector the Protector", was installed in Culebra, Puerto Rico in 2014. The sculpture was destroyed by Hurricane Maria in 2017, and Dambo created a second Hector sculpture in 2019.

By July 2025, Dambo and his team had created 170 trolls. Often, Dambo recruits local volunteers to help with the installation of the trolls.

The trolls are installed in various locations in 20 countries. Some of the locations include:

=== United States ===
- Three trolls (and a fourth hidden sculpture) in Clinton, Iowa
- Five trolls at Coastal Maine Botanical Gardens
- Five trolls at Dix Park, Raleigh, North Carolina
- Rita the Rock Planter, Victor, Colorado
- Six trolls as part of Northwest Trolls: Way of the Bird King
- A troll at Hainesport Township, New Jersey
- Three trolls at Bernheim Forest in Clermont, Kentucky
- Twelve at the North Carolina Arboretum in Asheville, North Carolina, as part of "Trolls: A Field Study"
- "Lulu the Troll", California Nature Art Museum, Solvang
- "Isak Heartstone", Breckenridge, Colorado
- "Mama Rosa", Wauwatosa, Wisconsin
- Six trolls at the Wild Center in Tupper Lake, New York, as part of the “TROLLS: Save the Humans” touring exhibition, formerly at Filoli in Redwood City, California
- "Greta Granite" and "Erik Rock" at Ninigret Park in Charlestown, Rhode Island
- "Detroit Lakes [Minnesota] has six trolls and three portals (extensions of Alexa’s arms) located throughout the Detroit Lakes area and beyond. (One portal is located just over the North Dakota border in downtown Fargo.)"
- Rose Wonders was featured at Burning Man - Black Rock City 2025 - as indicated in a video on the official burning man website - 2025 Black Rock City Art Tour, video by Jamen Percy Rose Wonders now resides in Filoli Gardens, California, according to Thomas Dambo's official website

=== Other countries ===
- Six trolls as the Giants of Mandurah, five in Mandurah, Western Australia and one in Subiaco
- Ulla, a giant female troll. Parque de la Familia, Santiago, Chile
- The Giant of the Sperrins. Gortin Glen forest park, Tyrone. Northern Ireland
- Børkop, Denmark
- "Mamma Wok", Seoul, South Korea
- Magical troll forest, De Schorre, Boom
- Hugging Olga. Kása Forest, Hódmezővásárhely, Hungary

=== Online Resources ===
An official "Troll Map" is available online and provides geo locations of troll sculpture installations.
