= Spring Hill, Somerville, Massachusetts =

- Spring Hill Historic District
- U.S. National Register of Historic Places
- U.S. Historic district
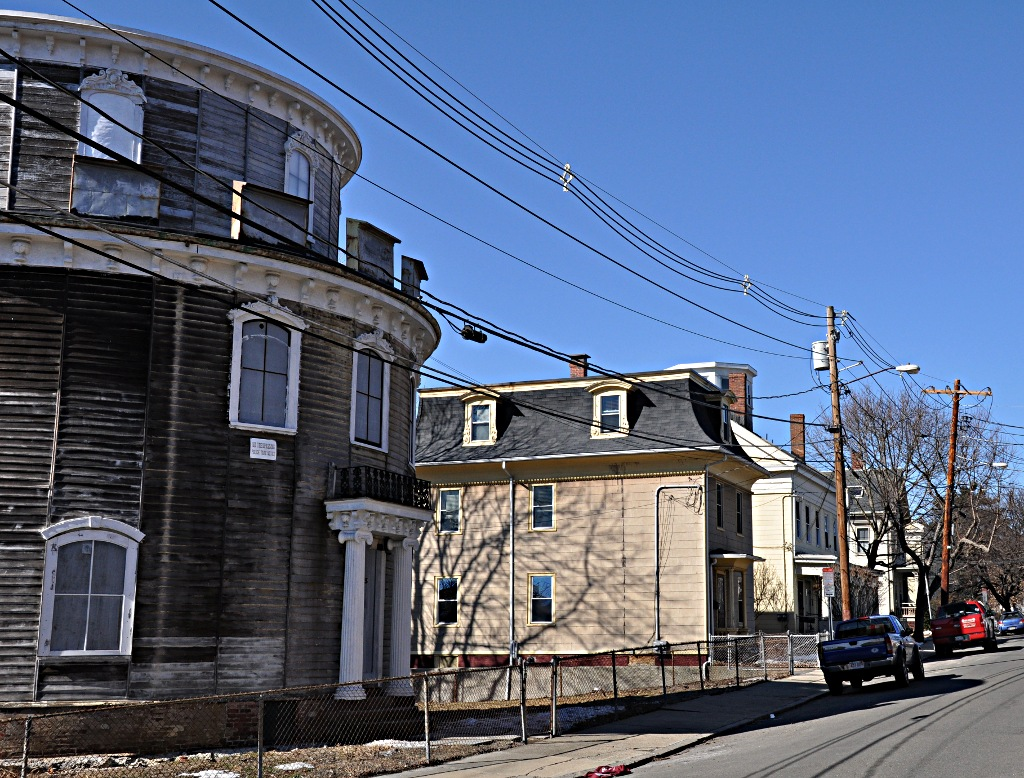
- View of Atherton Street, including Somerville's Round House

- Location within Massachusetts Location within the United States
- Location: Somerville, Massachusetts
- Coordinates: 42°23′7″N 71°6′29″W
- Architect: Loring, George A.
- Architectural style: Mid 19th Century Revival, Queen Anne, Shingle Style
- MPS: Somerville MPS
- NRHP reference No.: 89001222
- Added to NRHP: September 18, 1989

Spring Hill is a ridge in the central part of the city of Somerville, Massachusetts, United States, and the residential neighborhood that sits atop it. It runs northwest to southeast, roughly bounded by Highland Avenue, Somerville Avenue, Elm Street, and Willow Avenue. Summer Street runs along the hill's crest.

Spring Hill is a drumlin, one of many such hills in the Boston area composed of material deposited as glaciers of the Pleistocene epoch receded.

Historically agricultural in character, Spring Hill was sparsely developed until the mid-19th century. Present-day Central, Lowell, and Cedar Streets trace their origins to the mid-17th century, but few other roads broke the open space. Most development took place in the neighborhood between the 1840s and early 1900s. Spring Hill has a fine selection of Greek Revival houses and Victorians including Second Empires, Italianates, Gothic Revivals and Queen Annes. Large houses were built in the neighborhood as well as smaller workers' houses and attached houses. In the early 1900s, triple-deckers filled in the remaining land.

Part of the Spring Hill neighborhood was listed on the National Register of Historic Places in 1989. The Spring Hill Historic District stretches from Summer, Central, Atherton and Spring Streets.

== History ==
Topographical map showing contour of Spring Hill

Spring Hill is a glacial drumlin with an elongated summit roughly north of Summer Street, between Lowell and Cedar Streets in central Somerville. Its name derives from a spring that was useful for farmers who originally settled the area in the 17th century. The construction of the Boston and Lowell Railroad in the 1840s, with a station at the base of the hill, spurred residential construction in the area for businessmen working in Charlestown and Boston. The tract of land making up this district was purchased by George O. Brastow, a native of Wrentham who later became the first mayor of Somerville. In 1843, Brastow lotted one of Somerville's first residential subdivisions on the hill's south side between Central and Belmont Streets. Several original houses from this development remain on Atherton Street and off Harvard Street. The well-known Boston surveyor Alexander Wadsworth helped Brastow successfully lay out this subdivision to attract substantial homes on country estates for privileged suburbanites that held proprietary and managerial jobs. Its desirability was reinforced by expansive views of Cambridge and Boston, as well as easy access to Boston via the Fitchburg Railroad. Brastow's subdivision is the centerpiece of the Spring Hill Historic District, listed on the National Register of Historic Places in 1989. The district encompasses the city's best-preserved residential subdivision from the mid-19th century, with later infill construction in the late 19th and early 20th centuries.

Most development took place in the neighborhood between the 1840s and early 1900s. Spring Hill has a fine selection of Greek Revival houses and Victorians including Italianates, Gothic Revivals and Queen Annes. Large houses were built in the neighborhood as well as smaller workers' houses and attached houses. In the early 1900s triple-deckers filled in the remaining land.

In 1889, a water standpipe (tower) was erected on the hill between Belmont and Lowell Streets (present-day Bailey Park), making municipal drinking water available to Somerville residents at higher elevations, and so facilitated additional housing development in the city's more elevated areas.

By the end of the 19th century, the street grid had reached its present form, and the neighborhood filled with predominantly multi-family homes. Growth was fueled by the extension of streetcar lines from Lechmere Square and industrialization along Somerville Avenue and the Fitchburg Railroad.

Spring Hill is home to Somerville Hospital, opened in 1891 on Highland Avenue, the Round House, located on Atherton Street, and the Somerville Museum, located on Central Street.

At one time this neighborhood was home to both journalist Howie Carr and Winter Hill Gang leader Howie Winter. They lived one street apart, on Madison Street and Montrose Street, respectively. This was revealed in Carr's book about Irish mobster James "Whitey" Bulger, "The Brothers Bulger."

== Architecture and landmarks ==
There are several structures in Spring Hill that have been listed on the National Register of Historic Places. Spring Hill developed as a primarily residential neighborhood and most of its structures reflect that:

- The Enoch Robinson Round House is a cylindrical, wood-frame residential building on Atherton Street. It was built in 1856 by hardware manufacturer Enoch Robinson, and is considered an offshoot of the octagon house-style popularized by phrenologist Orson Fowler. It has been vacant and deteriorating for many years, but is under new ownership and slowly being restored.
- The Martin W. Carr School, built in 1898, was originally an elementary school. The building has been converted to condominiums.
- The Alexander Foster House, an Italianate-style house on Laurel Street built in 1860
- The House at 16-18 Preston Road, a Colonial Revival triple-decker built in 1910
- The Joseph K. James House, a Colonial Revival house built in 1893
- The Lemuel Snow Jr. House, a Queen Anne style house built in 1890

=== Historic district ===
The historic district is roughly L-shaped, and is bounded on the north by Summer Street, on the west by Spring Street, on the south by Atherton Street as far as Beech Street, on the east by Central Street (between Summer and Monmouth Streets) and Harvard Street (further south to Atherton). It includes 69 historically significant buildings, most of which were built during the area's first major period of development, 1845-1870. A second period of construction 1885-1910 resulted in the infill construction of additional buildings, including the 1898 Martin W. Carr School, the only non-residential building in the district.

The oldest buildings in the district include seven of the first eight houses built after Brastow's subdivision; these are all Greek Revival two-family residences, of which 46-48 Atherton Street is the least altered. The Italianate Round House was built at Atherton and Beech Streets in 1856, and remains a local curiosity. Its builder, Enoch Robinson, also built the fine Italianate house at 47 Spring Street, which is one of the finest examples of that style in the city.

Most of the buildings in the district are wood frame structures, with one to three housing units. Most were not architect designed; there is only one house, 152 Summer Street, that has been definitely attributed to an architect. In this case it was local architect George Loring, who is known to have designed more than 100 residences in the city, although only a few survive. The c. 1890 Rymes House at 49 Spring Street may also be a Loring design.

== See also ==
- Winter Hill
- National Register of Historic Places listings in Somerville, Massachusetts
