= Springhill Township, Pennsylvania =

Springhill Township is the name of some places in the U.S. state of Pennsylvania:

- Springhill Township, Fayette County, Pennsylvania
- Springhill Township, Greene County, Pennsylvania
