= Spring Hill High School =

Spring Hill High School may refer to the following educational institutions:

- Spring Hill High School (Arkansas), Spring Hill, Arkansas
- Spring Hill High School (South Carolina), Chapin, South Carolina
- Spring Hill High School (Tennessee), Columbia, Tennessee
- Spring Hill High School (Texas), Longview, Texas

== See also ==
- Springhill High School (disambiguation)
