= Springhill, Indiana =

Coordinates: 39°26′00″N 85°25′16″W

Springhill is a ghost town in Decatur County, Indiana, in the United States.

== History ==
A post office was established as Spring Hill in 1827, and it remained in operation until it was discontinued in 1901.
