= House at 16–18 Preston Road =

Historic house in Massachusetts, United States

- U.S. National Register of Historic Places
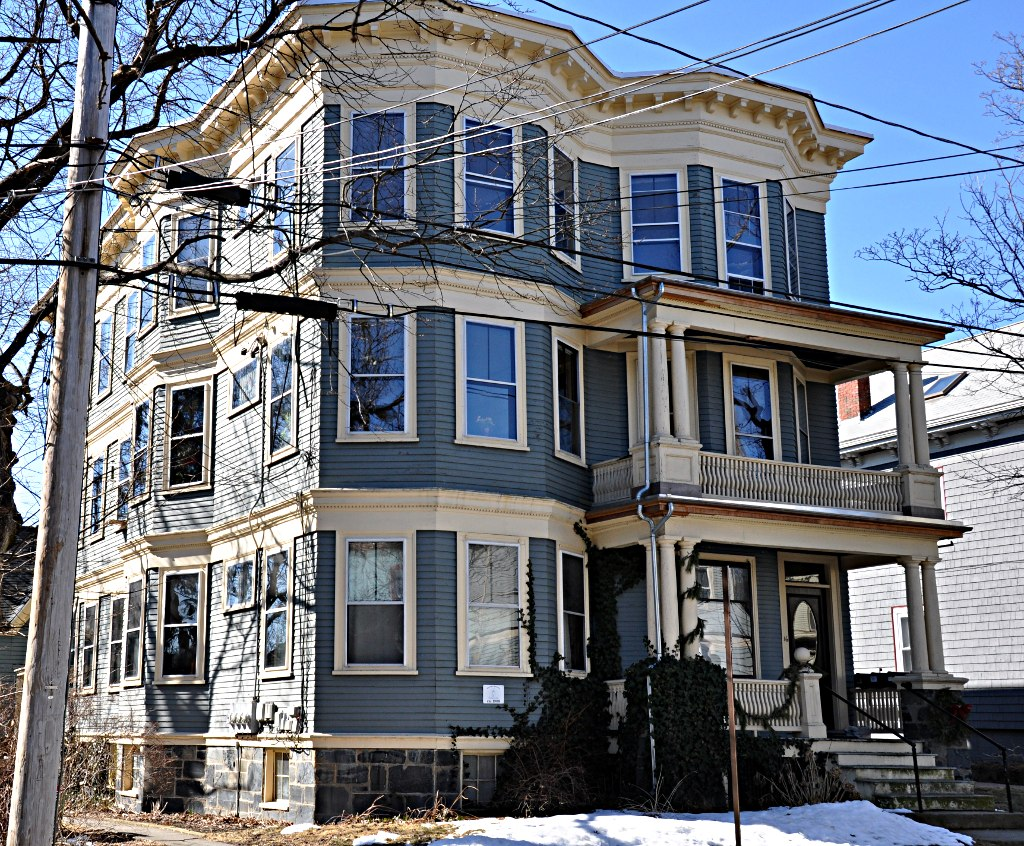

- Location within Massachusetts Location within the United States
- Location: 16–18 Preston Rd., Somerville, Massachusetts
- Coordinates: 42°23′1.90″N 71°6′5.83″W
- Built: 1910
- Architectural style: Colonial Revival
- MPS: Somerville MPS
- NRHP reference No.: 89001279
- Added to NRHP: September 18, 1989

The House at 16–18 Preston Road in Somerville, Massachusetts is one of the city's finest Colonial Revival multiunit houses. The three-story wood-frame house was built c. 1910. It has a flat roof with projecting eaves, and a modillioned cornice. The front facade has a two-story porch, with each level supported by clusters of colonettes. The house was built on the site of a former apple orchard owned by George Ireland; the street is named for Ireland's wife, Jane Preston Ireland.

The house was listed on the National Register of Historic Places in 1989.

== See also ==
- National Register of Historic Places listings in Somerville, Massachusetts
