= Round House (Somerville, Massachusetts) =

House in Somerville, Massachusetts, US (built 1856)

Coordinates: 42.38444°N 71.10761°W

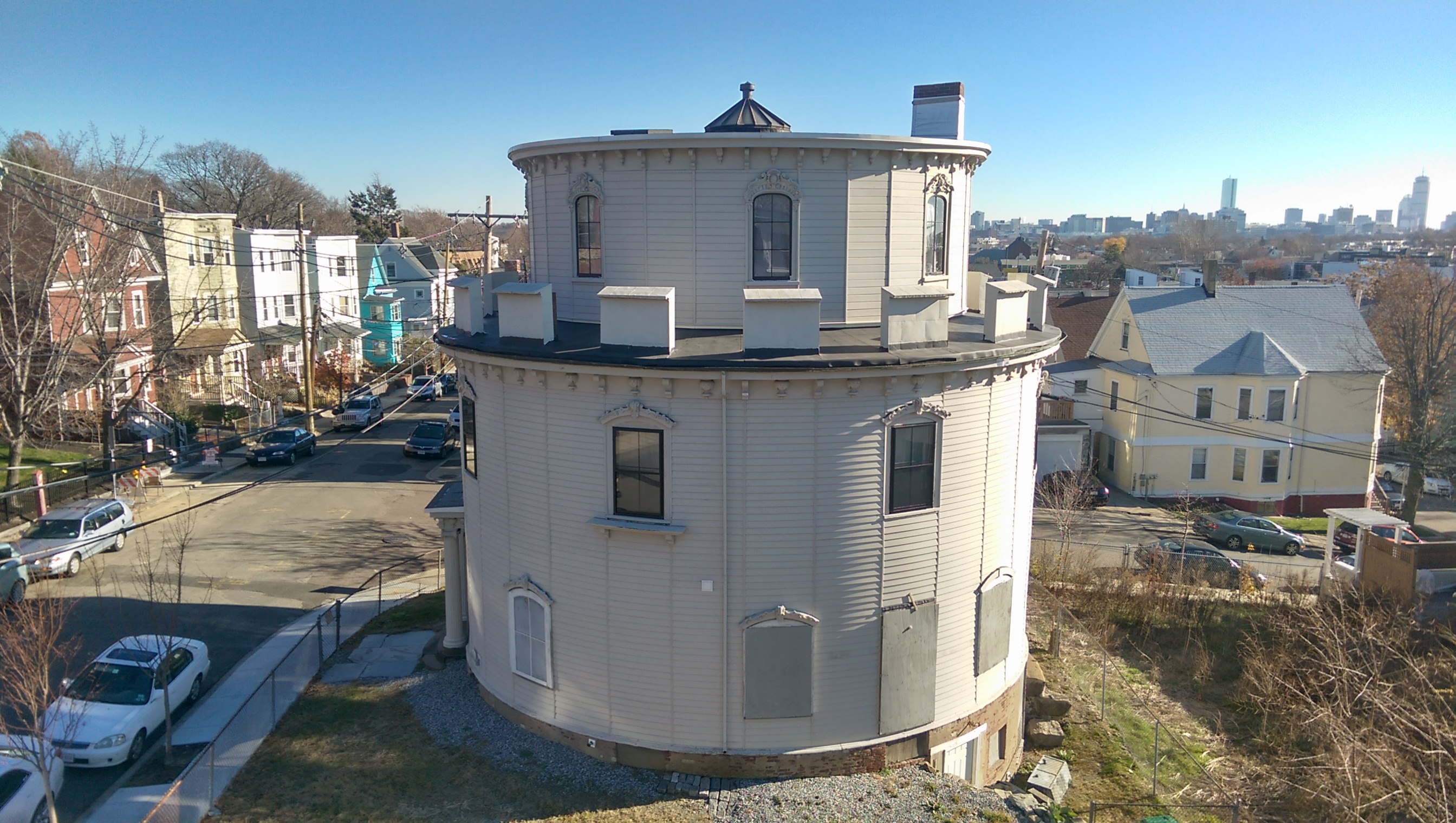
- The Round House in 2015

General information
- Status: Completed
- Type: Residential
- Location: 36 Atherton Street, Somerville, Massachusetts, United States
- Completed: 1856
- Owner: George E. Saropoulos; Anna Maria H. Saropoulos

Dimensions
- Other dimensions: 40-foot (12 m) diameter

Technical details
- Floor count: 3
- Floor area: 1,257 square feet (116.8 m^{2})

Design and construction
- Architect: Enoch Robinson
- Designations: Endangered Historic Resources (1997)

The Round House is a cylindrical, wood-frame residential building at 36 Atherton Street in the Spring Hill neighborhood of Somerville, Massachusetts, United States.

The exterior of the Round House features two flush stories, with a third stepped back behind a series of battlements and embrasures. Inside, the three-story structure contains a central rotunda topped with a glass skylight, with interconnected rooms branching off on each level. There are four rooms on the first floor, six rooms on the second floor and another four rooms on the third floor.

== History ==
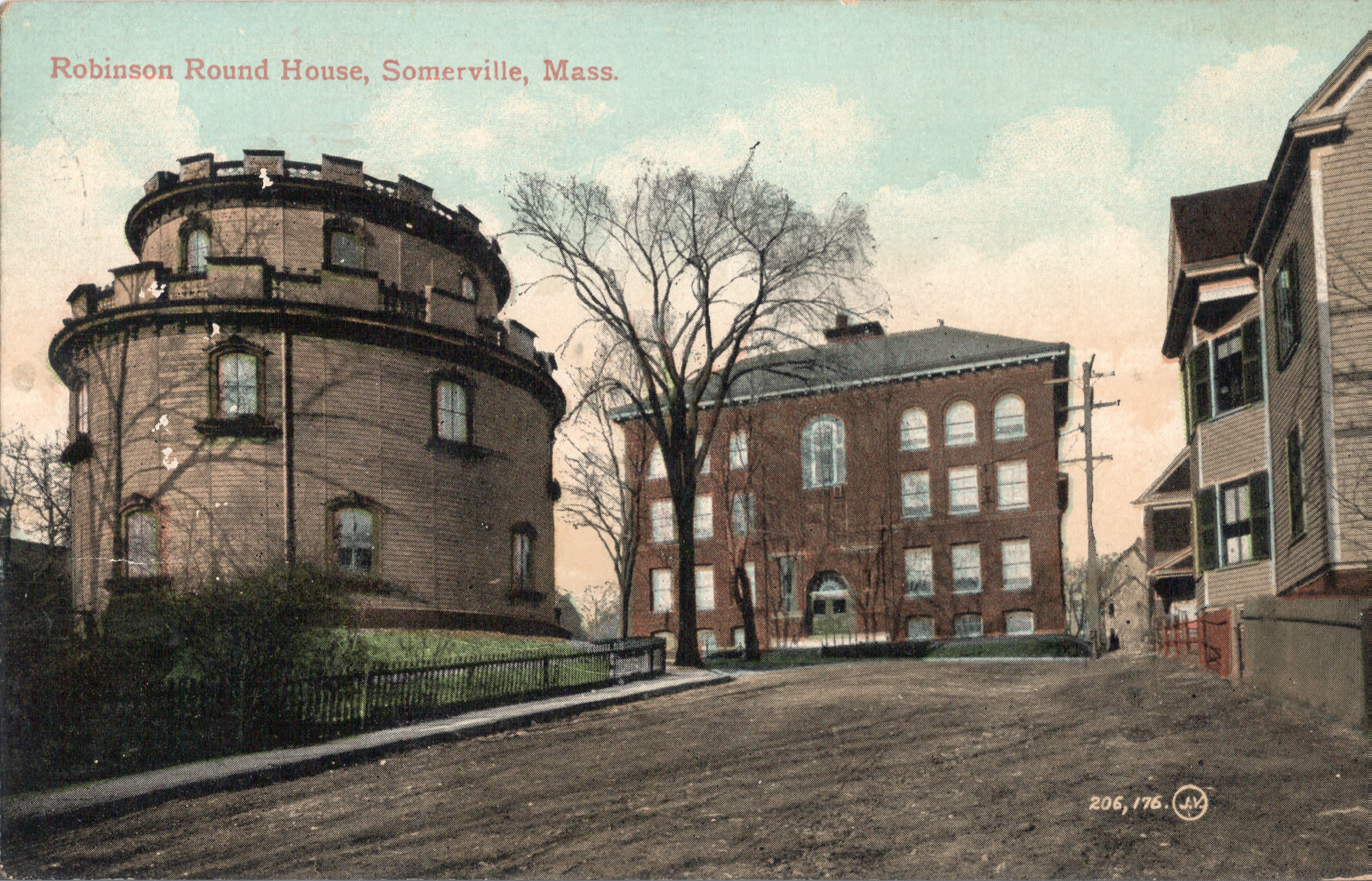
Postcard from 1913 showing Robinson Round House

The house was built in 1856 by hardware manufacturer Enoch Robinson, and is considered an offshoot of the octagon house-style popularized by phrenologist Orson Fowler.

By the 1970s, it was owned by Alice Maneatis, who did some restoration work. Students from Boston's North Bennet Street School performed exterior renovation work in 1986. The house was added to the National Register of Historic Places in 1889 as a contributing property to the Spring Hill Historic District. Historic Massachusetts (later Preservation MASS) placed the building on its list of Endangered Historic Resources for 1997. A restoration was completed in 2018.
