= Spring Hill School District =

Spring Hill School District may refer to:

- Spring Hill School District (Arkansas), based in Hope, Arkansas.
- Spring Hill School District (Kansas), based in Spring Hill, Kansas.
- Spring Hill Independent School District, based in Longview, Texas.
