= Spring Hill Farm =

Spring Hill Farm may refer to:

== Places ==
in the United States

(by state)

- Spring Hill Farm and Stock Ranch House, Strong City, Kansas, listed on the National Register of Historic Places (NRHP)
- Spring Hill Farm (Lexington, Kentucky), listed on the NRHP in Fayette County, Kentucky
- Spring Hill Farm (Ellicott City, Maryland), a historic plantation
- Spring Hill Farm (Lebanon, New Hampshire), NRHP-listed
- Spring Hill Farm (Hamilton, Virginia), NRHP-listed
- Spring Hill Farm (McLean, Virginia), NRHP-listed

== Other uses ==
- Spring Hill Farm, nom de course for the Thoroughbred racing stable of James D. Norris
