= Spring Hill Historic District (Sandwich, Massachusetts) =

Historic district in Massachusetts, United States

- U.S. National Register of Historic Places
- U.S. Historic district
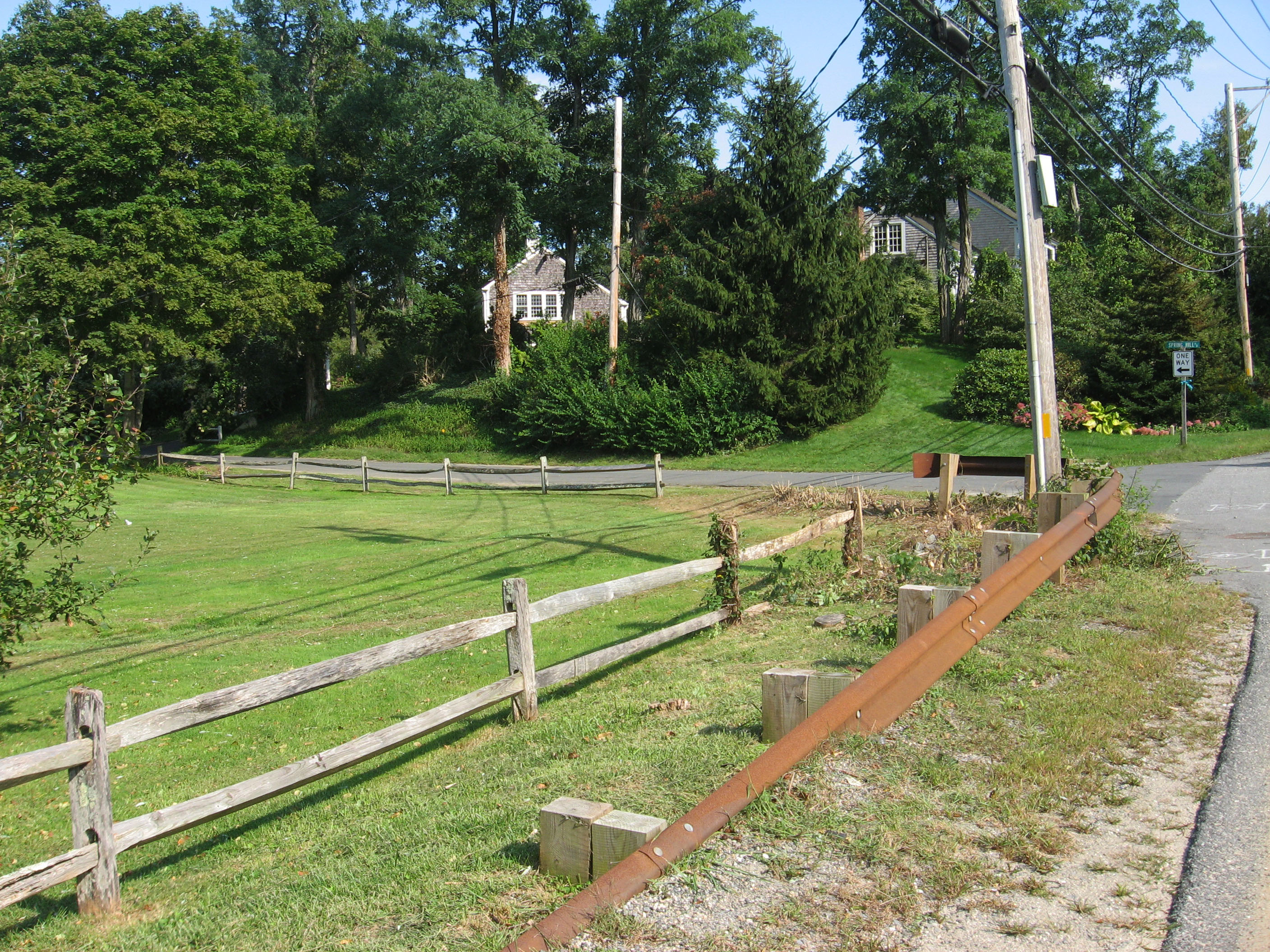

- Location within Cape Cod Location within Massachusetts Location within the United States
- Location: Sandwich, Massachusetts
- Coordinates: 41°44′53″N 70°28′22″W
- Area: 117 acres (47 ha)
- NRHP reference No.: 10000862
- Added to NRHP: October 28, 2010

The Spring Hill Historic District of Sandwich, Massachusetts, is a rural and residential historic district reflecting the area's long history. The district includes the Wing Fort House, one of the oldest wood-frame houses in North America, and the site of the first Quaker meeting in the New World. It is also notable for its views, and for its cranberry bogs, some of which have been actively cultivated since the 19th century. The district was listed on the National Register of Historic Places in 2010.

The main roads through the district are Main Street (Massachusetts Route 6A) and Spring Hill Road. The district's boundaries run from roughly from Great Island Road and Main Street in the west, including properties along the two main roads and some adjacent streets, to Norse Pines Drive and Quaker Meetinghouse Road in the east.

== See also ==
- National Register of Historic Places listings in Barnstable County, Massachusetts
