= Springhill, Missouri =

Unincorporated community in Missouri, U.S.

Coordinates: 39°52′25″N 93°38′38″W

Springhill is an unincorporated community in Livingston County, in the U.S. state of Missouri.

== History ==
Springhill was originally called Navestown, and under the latter name sprang up in the 1830s about a store started by Jesse Nave, who named the site after himself. The present name is for the springs near the original town site. A post office called Naves Store was established in 1838, the name was changed to Spring Hill in 1849, and the post office closed in 1901.
