= Public Consulting Group =

Management consulting firm based in Boston

- Founded: 1986
- Headquarters: Boston, Massachusetts

Public Consulting Group, Inc. (PCG) is a management consulting firm based in Boston, United States that provides consulting services to public sector clients. It was founded in 1986.

== History ==
Public Consulting Group was founded in 1986 and is headquartered in Boston, Massachusetts. The firm provides consulting services primarily to public sector organizations in health, education, and human services.

== Contracts ==
PCG was funded by states to operate a call center in Washington, which aided people in migrating from welfare to disability payments. Welfare is split between the state and the federal government, whereas the federal government covers all of disability. In 2013, the state of Missouri agreed to pay $2,300 per person whom PCG migrated.

PCG and Maximus were contracted by states to apply for social security on behalf of foster kids, without their knowledge.

In 2024, the state of Texas signed an $84 million contract with PCG to formulate a Bible-based curriculum for the state. PCG subcontracted organizations including the conservative think tank Texas Public Policy Foundation and Hillsdale College.

PCG was contracted by New York to develop an Early intervention software called EI HUB, which, after many delays, therapists are now required to use. It has been criticized for being buggy, slow, and in some cases not functional.

In 2025, the state of Indiana outsourced its Adult Protective Services to PCG.
