= Springhills, Ohio =

Unincorporated community in Champaign County, Ohio, United States

Coordinates: 40°15′20″N 83°52′11″W

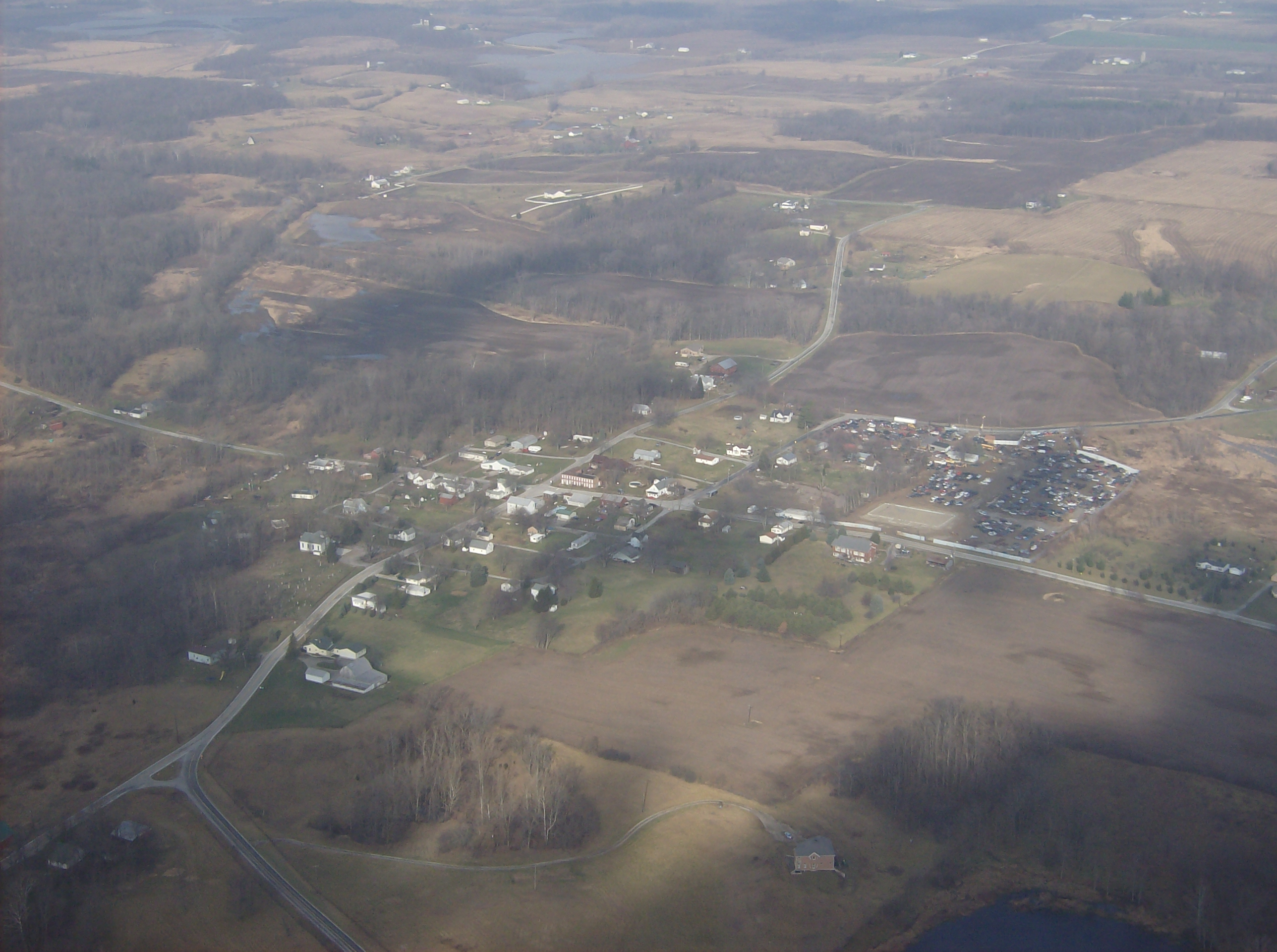
Aerial view of Springhills from the southeast

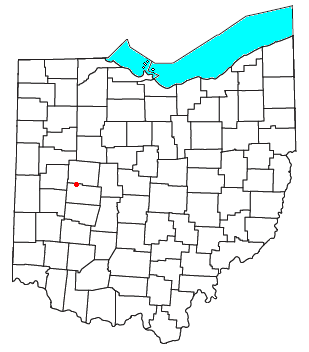
Location of Springhills, Ohio

Springhills is an unincorporated community in northwestern Harrison Township, Champaingn County, Ohio, United States.

== Description ==
The community lies at the intersection of State Route 245 with Crowl and Springhill-DeGraff Roads. Graves Creek, a subsidiary of the Great Miami River through Stony Creek, runs along the western edge of Springhills. It is located 6 miles (9.7 km) west of West Liberty and 11.5 miles (18.5 km) northwest of Urbana, the county seat of Champaign County.

== History ==
Springhills was originally known as Middleburg, and under the latter name was laid out in 1832. When the post office was to be opened, it was discovered that there was already a Middleburg in Logan County, Ohio, and so the town was renamed Spring Hills for its location near natural springs and at the base of hills.
