= Spring Hill (Raleigh, North Carolina) =

Historic house in North Carolina, United States

- U.S. National Register of Historic Places
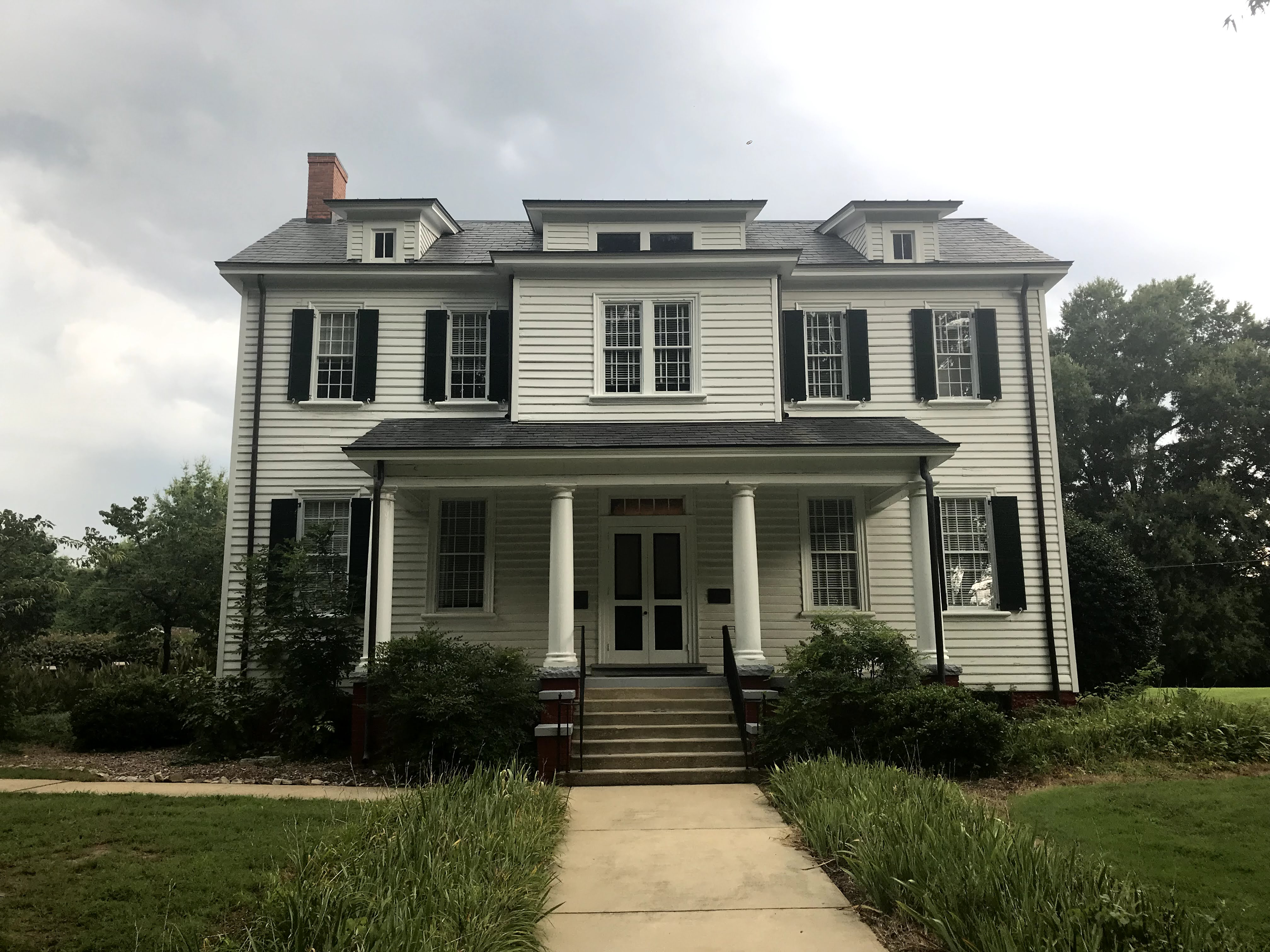

- Location within North Carolina Location within the United States
- Location: 705 Barbour Dr., Raleigh, North Carolina
- Coordinates: 35°46′21″N 78°40′00″W
- Area: 3 acres (1.2 ha)
- Built: c. 1816-1820, 1908
- Architectural style: Colonial Revival, Georgian vernacular
- NRHP reference No.: 83004003
- Added to NRHP: December 29, 1983

Spring Hill, also known as the Theophilus Hunter House, is a historic plantation house located at Raleigh, Wake County, North Carolina. It was built between about 1816 and 1820, and is a two-story rectangular Georgian-style frame house with one-story rear wing. It was renovated in 1908 in the Colonial Revival style. It was renovated again in the 1960s. The house stands on the grounds of the now-closed Dorothea Dix Hospital and was occupied by members of its staff.

It was listed on the National Register of Historic Places in 1983.

The house has served as the North Carolina Japan Center at North Carolina State University since June 2001.
