= Arkansas Highway 32 =

State highway in Arkansas, United States

Highway 32

Route information
- Maintained by ArDOT
- Existed: 1926–present

Section 1
- Length: 40.02 mi (64.41 km)
- West end: SH-3 at the Oklahoma state line near Foreman
- Major intersections: US 59 / US 71 in Ashdown
- East end: AR 355 at Saratoga

Section 2
- Length: 3.96 mi (6.37 km)
- West end: US 278 near Hope Municipal Airport
- East end: AR 29 near Hope

Section 3
- Length: 12.00 mi (19.31 km)
- West end: US 278 near Hope
- East end: AR 53 in Bodcaw

Section 4
- Length: 6.87 mi (11.06 km)
- West end: AR 53 near Bodcaw
- East end: US 371 in Willisville

Location
- Country: United States
- State: Arkansas
- Counties: Little River, Hempstead, Howard, Nevada

Highway system
- Arkansas Highway System; Interstate; US; State; Business; Spurs; Suffixed; Scenic; Heritage
← AR 31	→ AR 33

Arkansas Highway 32 (AR 32) is a designation for four state highways in South Arkansas. One segment of 40.02 miles (64.41 km) runs from the Oklahoma state line east to Highway 355 at Saratoga. A second segment of 3.96 miles (6.37 km) runs from U.S. Route 278 (US 278) east of Hope Municipal Airport east to Highway 29 north of Hope. A third segment of 12.00 miles (19.31 km) runs from US 278 east of Hope east to Highway 53 in Bodcaw. A fourth segment of 6.87 miles (11.06 km) runs from Highway 53 south of Bodcaw east to US 371 in Willisville.

== Route description ==
=== Section 1 ===
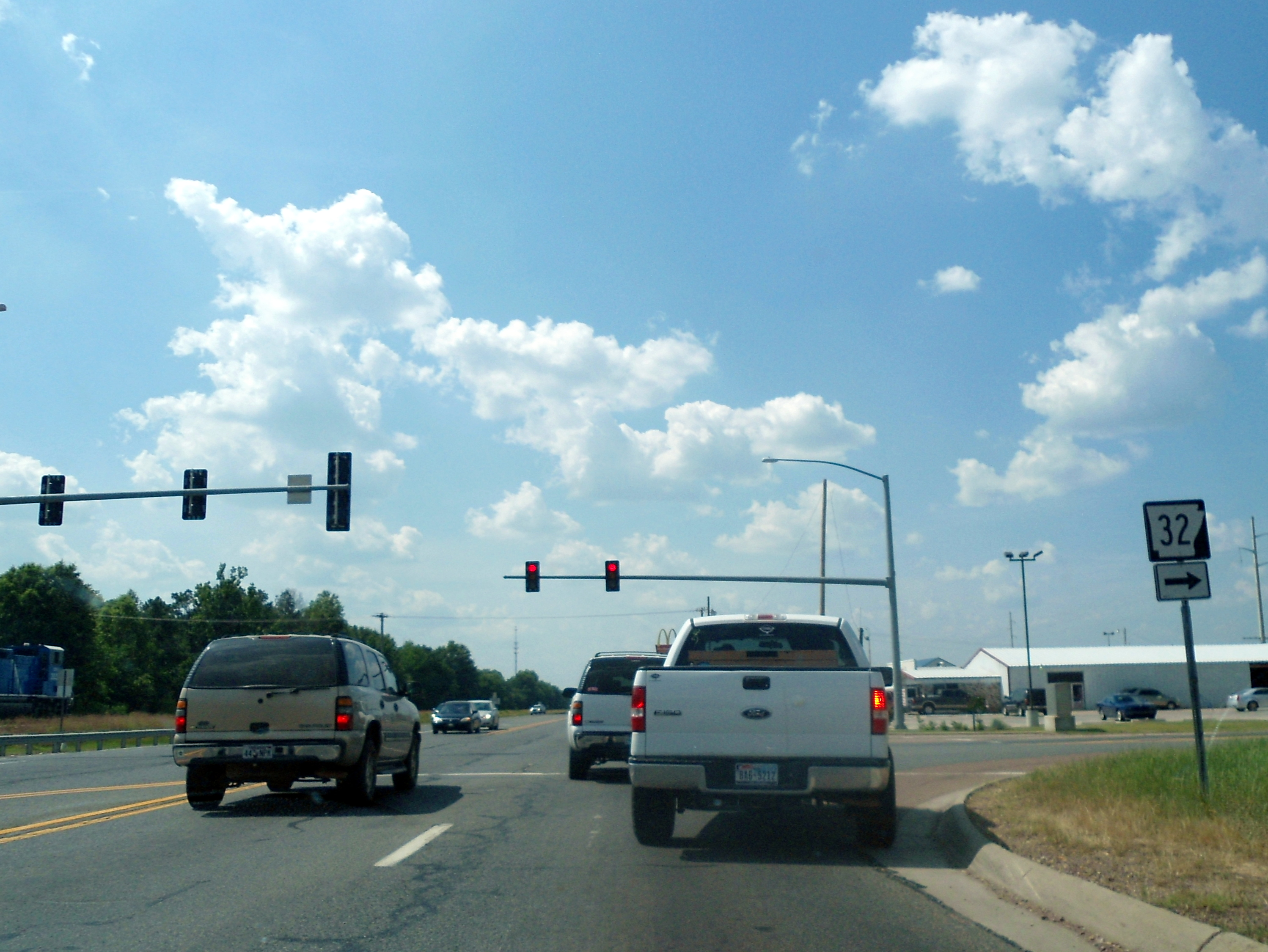
US 59/US 71 connects to Highway 32 via the short connecting Highway 32Y in Ashdown

Highway 32 begins at the Oklahoma state line as a continuation of OK-3 and runs east to Highway 41 in Foreman. After angling south, Highway 32 meets US 59/US 71 in Ashdown before reaching Saratoga, where it terminates at Highway 355.

=== Section 2 ===
The route begins at US 278 east of Hope Municipal Airport and runs east before turning south towards Highway 29, where it terminates north of Hope.

=== Section 3 ===
The route begins at US 278 east of Hope and runs east for about 12.00 miles (19.31 km), entering Nevada County, before terminating at Highway 53 in Bodcaw.

=== Section 4 ===
The route begins at Highway 53 south of Bodcaw and runs east for about 6.87 miles (11.06 km) until it reaches the intersection of US 371 in Willisville, where it terminates.

== Major intersections ==
Mile markers reset at some concurrencies.

County	Location	mi	km	Destinations	Notes
Little River		0.00	0.00	SH-3 west – Tom	Continuation into Oklahoma
Little River	Foreman	5.30	8.53	AR 108 west	Western end of AR 108 concurrency
Little River	Foreman	5.80	9.33	AR 41 north / AR 108 east – Alleene, De Queen	Eastern end of AR 108 concurrency; western end of AR 41 concurrency
Little River	Foreman			AR 108S west	Eastern terminus of AR 108S
Little River		0.00	0.00	AR 41 south – New Boston, TX	Eastern end of AR 41 concurrency
Little River		13.67	22.00	AR 32B east – Ashdown	Western terminus of AR 32B
Little River				I-49	Proposed; future exit 55 on I-49
Little River	Ashdown	17.21	27.70	US 71 (US 59) – Ashdown, Texarkana	Interchange
Little River		18.10	29.13	AR 32B west	Eastern terminus of AR 32B
Little River	Fomby	24.24	39.01	AR 317 north – Yarborough Landing	Southern terminus of AR 317
Hempstead		32.95	53.03	AR 234 west – Saratoga Landing	Eastern terminus of AR 234
Howard	Saratoga	34.22	55.07	AR 355 – Hope, Mineral Springs	Eastern terminus
Gap in route
Hempstead		0.00	0.00	US 278 – Hope, Nashville	Western terminus
Hempstead		3.96	6.37	AR 29 – Hope, Blevins	Eastern terminus
Hempstead	Gap in route				
Hempstead		0.00	0.00	US 278 – Hope, Rosston	Western terminus
Nevada	Bodcaw	12.00	19.31	AR 53 – Prescott, Falcon, Buckner	Eastern terminus
Nevada	Gap in route				
Nevada		0.00	0.00	AR 53 – Prescott, Falcon, Buckner	Western terminus
Nevada	Willisville	6.87	11.06	US 371 – Prescott, Waldo	Eastern terminus
1.000 mi = 1.609 km; 1.000 km = 0.621 mi: Concurrency terminus

== Ashdown business route ==
Highway 32B
- Location: Little River County
- Length: 4.31 mi (6.94 km)
- Existed: December 2005–present

Arkansas Highway 32 Business is a business route of 4.31 miles (6.94 km) in Little River County.

Major intersections

The entire route is in Little River County.

Location	mi	km	Destinations	Notes
	0.00	0.00	AR 32	Western terminus
Ashdown	2.78	4.47	US 59 north / US 71 north	Western end of US 59/US 71 concurrency
Ashdown	0.00	0.00	US 59 south / US 71 south	Eastern end of US 59/US 71 concurrency
	1.53	2.46	AR 32	Eastern terminus
1.000 mi = 1.609 km; 1.000 km = 0.621 mi: Concurrency terminus
