= Arkansas Highway 355 =

State highway in Arkansas, United States

Highway 355
- AR 355 highlighted in red

Route information
- Maintained by ArDOT
- Existed: April 1, 1926–present

Section 1
- Length: 22.315 mi (35.913 km)
- South end: US 371 at Lamartine
- North end: AR 29 at Center Point

Section 2
- Length: 6.396 mi (10.293 km)
- South end: AR 29 at Evening Shade
- North end: AR 174 at Spring Hill

Section 3
- Length: 31.219 mi (50.242 km)
- South end: US 67 in Fulton
- North end: US 278

Location
- Country: United States
- State: Arkansas
- Counties: Columbia, Nevada, Hempstead, Howard

Highway system
- Arkansas Highway System; Interstate; US; State; Business; Spurs; Suffixed; Scenic; Heritage
← AR 354	→ AR 356

Highway 355 (AR 355 and Hwy. 355) is a designation for three north–south state highways in Southwest Arkansas. The routes are maintained by the Arkansas Department of Transportation (ArDOT).

Between Saratoga and Mineral Springs, AR 355 is part of the Trail of Tears within the Arkansas Heritage Trails System.

== Route description ==
The ArDOT maintains AR 355 like all other parts of the state highway system. As a part of these responsibilities, the Department tracks the volume of traffic using its roads in surveys using a metric called average annual daily traffic (AADT). ArDOT estimates the traffic level for a segment of roadway for any average day of the year in these surveys. As of 2022, AADT ranged from 2,800 VPD in Fulton, 2,400 VPD near Saratoga, and 2,700 VPD near Mineral Springs, but dropped to 520 VPD and 320 VPD on the north and south sides of the US 371 intersection, respectively. The second segment had an AADT of 520 VPD. The third segment had the lowest counts, with 290 VPD near Patmos, 300 VPD near Falcon, and 460 VPD near the eastern terminus. For reference, the American Association of State Highway and Transportation Officials (AASHTO), classifies roads with fewer than 400 vehicles per day as a very low volume local road.

No segment of Highway 355 has been listed as part of the National Highway System, a network of roads important to the nation's economy, defense, and mobility.

=== Fulton to US 278 ===
AR 355 begins in the small town of Fulton at a junction with US 67 near both Interstate 30 (I-30) and the Red River. The route runs north, passing under the Union Pacific Railway tracks before serving as the southern terminus of AR 195 (Ogan Street). AR 355 exits the community northbound, passing within a few miles of the Little River Wildlife Management Area (WMA), Nacatoch Ravines Natural Area, and the John W. Turk Jr. Coal Plant before entering McNab, where it crosses the Kiamichi Railroad tracks. The route continues north toward Saratoga, winding through the Piney Woods to serve as the southern terminus of AR 73 before crossing into Howard County.

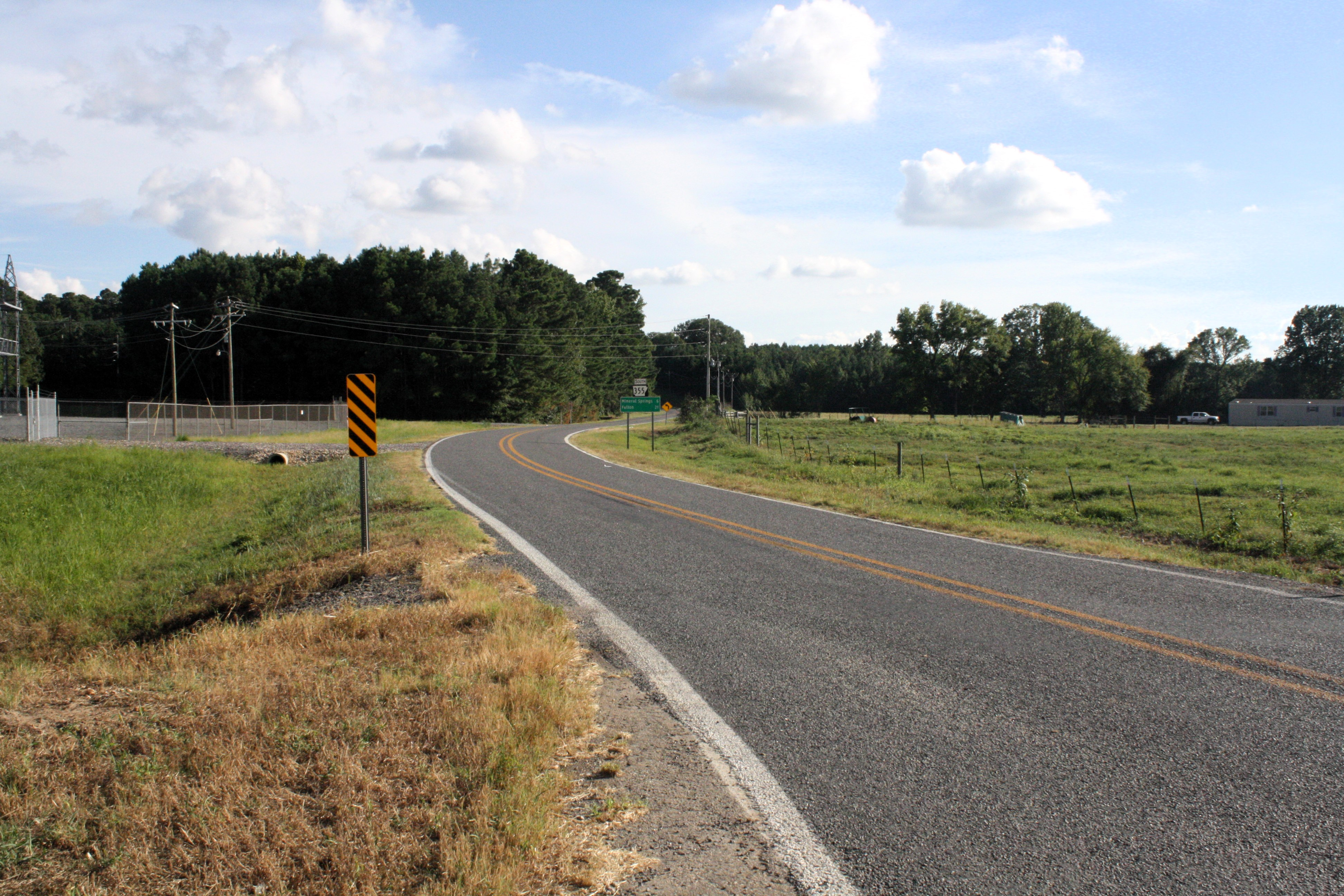
First reassurance marker for AR 355 south of US 371

Shortly upon entering Howard County, AR 355 serves as the eastern terminus of AR 32 at Saratoga (a census-designated place) near the Saratoga Blackland Prairie Natural Area. The route continues north along the east side of Lake Millwood before entering the small town of Tollette. Within Tollette, AR 355 is known as Martin Luther King Jr Road, passing Tollette City Hall before serving as the western terminus of AR 332 (Schooley Road). Continuing north, AR 355 winds to Mineral Springs, where it overlaps AR 27 through downtown before turning north alone and winding into a rural part of Howard County. AR 355 intersects US 371 approximately 4 miles (6.4 km) west of Nashville before winding north to a junction with US 278, where it terminates.

=== Spring Hill to Evening Shade ===
A second section of AR 355 begins in Columbia County approximately 6 miles (9.7 km) southwest of Hope and 4 miles (6.4 km) east of Bois D'Arc Creek Wildlife Management Area (WMA). The designation begins at an intersection at the unincorporated community of Spring Hill near Spring Hill High School, with AR 174 running north and a county road (Spring Lake Road) continuing south from the junction. AR 355 runs southeast to a junction with AR 29 at Evening Shade, where it terminates. The roadway continues east as Hempstead County Route 8 (CR 8, HP Powell Road).

=== Center Point to Lamartine ===
A third section of AR 355 begins at an intersection with AR 29 at the unincorporated community of Center Point in southern Hempstead County. The route runs east through a rural area to the small town of Patmos before winding into Nevada County. Now serving a rural area with oil and gas field, AR 355 intersects and briefly concurs with AR 53 at Falcon. Continuing southeast, AR 355 passes through Falcon Bottoms Natural Area and crosses Dorcheat Bayou before entering Columbia County. AR 355 passes through the unincorporated communities of Bethel and Bright before a junction with US 371 at Lamartine, where it terminates.

== History ==
State Road 55
- Existed: 1926–1958

Highway 55 was one of the original state highways, designating a gravel road between Fulton and Mineral Springs as State Road 55. By the 1953 state highway map, a second segment was created between Spring Hill and Evening Shade. The route was realigned around Mineral Springs and through Tollette in 1955. On March 7, 1962, the Highway Commission extended AR 355 from Mineral Springs to the current northern terminus (AR 4, now US 278).

The Arkansas General Assembly passed the Act 148 of 1957, the Milum Road Act, creating 10–12 miles (16–19 km) of new state highways in each county. Following the act, two additional segments of AR 355 were created on July 10, 1957: from AR 29 to Patmos, and from Willisville to AR 53. In 1958, all segments were re-numbered to avoid duplication following the designation of I-55 in the state. The third segment was extended east from Patmos to the Nevada County line on April 24, 1963 as part of a large addition of county roads to the state highway system, with another extension to Falcon on November 23, 1966. On January 26, 1977, the Highway Commission approved a designation swap in Nevada County to improve route continuity: AR 355 between Bodcaw and Willisville became AR 32, with the segment of AR 32 from Falcon to the Columbia County line becoming AR 355. On June 29, 1978, the Columbia County judge requested an extension of AR 355 east to AR 19 at Lamartine (now US 371).

On February 18, 1959, the Arkansas State Highway Commission agreed to a proposal from the Hempstead County judge to return AR 355 between Spring Hill and Evening Shade, and portions of AR 32, to county maintenance in exchange for extending AR 29 from Blevins to AR 19. The former AR 355 alignment was restored to the state highway system on November 23, 1966, including an extension to Bois D'Arc Lake, as part of a large addition of county roads to the state highway system. The following year, the alignment was switched to follow a different series of county roads at the request of the Hempstead County judge, having previously followed CR 63 and CR 163.

== Major intersections ==
Mile markers reset at some concurrencies.

County	Location	mi	km	Destinations	Notes
Columbia	Lamartine	22.315	35.913	US 371 – Rosston, Waldo	Southern terminus
Nevada	Falcon	13.110	21.098	AR 53 – Buckner, Bodcaw	
Hempstead	Center Point	0.000	0.000	AR 29 / CR 7 west (Dooley Ferry Road) – Lewisville, Hope	Northern terminus
Hempstead	Gap in route				
Hempstead	Evening Shade	0.000	0.000	AR 29 / CR 8 east (HP Powell Road)	Southern terminus
Hempstead	Spring Hill	6.396	10.293	AR 174 west	Northern terminus
Hempstead	Gap in route				
Hempstead	Fulton	0.000	0.000	US 67 – Hope, Texarkana	Southern terminus
Hempstead	Fulton	0.39	0.63	AR 195 north (Ogan Street) – Old Liberty, Historic Washington State Park	
Hempstead	Saratoga	11.54	18.57	AR 73 south – Columbus, Hope	
Howard	Saratoga	12.15	19.55	AR 32 west – Millwood, Millwood State Park	
Howard	Tollette	16.91	27.21	AR 332 east (Schooley Road) to US 278	
Howard	Mineral Springs	21.652– 0.000	34.846– 0.000	AR 27 – Ben Lomond, Nashville, Murfreesboro	
Howard		5.99	9.64	US 371 – Lockesburg, Nashville	Former AR 24
Howard		9.567	15.397	US 278 – Dierks, Nashville	Northern terminus
1.000 mi = 1.609 km; 1.000 km = 0.621 mi: Concurrency terminus

== Former spur route ==
Highway 355Y
- Location: Hempstead County, Arkansas
- Length: 0.1 mi (160 m)
- Existed: January 25, 1967–2021

Highway 355Y (AR 355Y and Hwy. 355Y) is a former spur route in Hempstead County.

Major intersections

The entire route was in Hempstead County.

Location	mi	km	Destinations	Notes
	0.0	0.0	AR 355	eastern terminus
	0.1	0.16	Bois D'Arc Lake	western terminus
1.000 mi = 1.609 km; 1.000 km = 0.621 mi
