= Oklahoma State Highway 87 =

State highway in Oklahoma, United States

State Highway 87

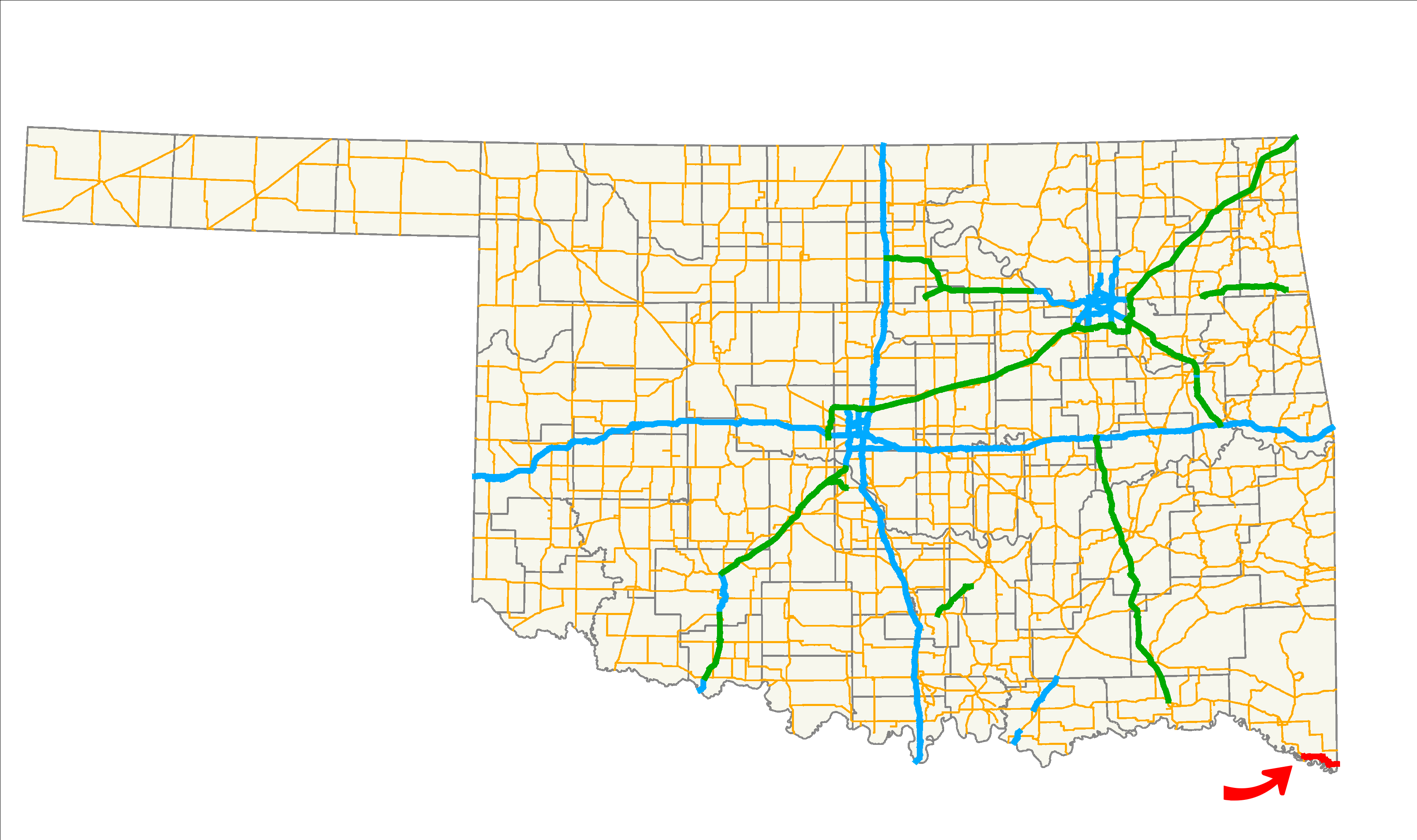

Route information
- Maintained by ODOT
- Length: 14.58 mi (23.46 km)

Major junctions
- West end: US 259 near Harris
- East end: AR 108 at the Arkansas state line near Rocky Comfort, AR

Location
- Country: United States
- State: Oklahoma

Highway system
- Oklahoma State Highway System; Interstate; US; State; Turnpikes
← SH-86	→ SH-88

State Highway 87 is a highway in southeastern Oklahoma, running for 14.58 miles (23.46 km). It passes through the extreme southeastern corner of the state, running entirely through McCurtain Co. It has no lettered spur routes.

== Route description ==
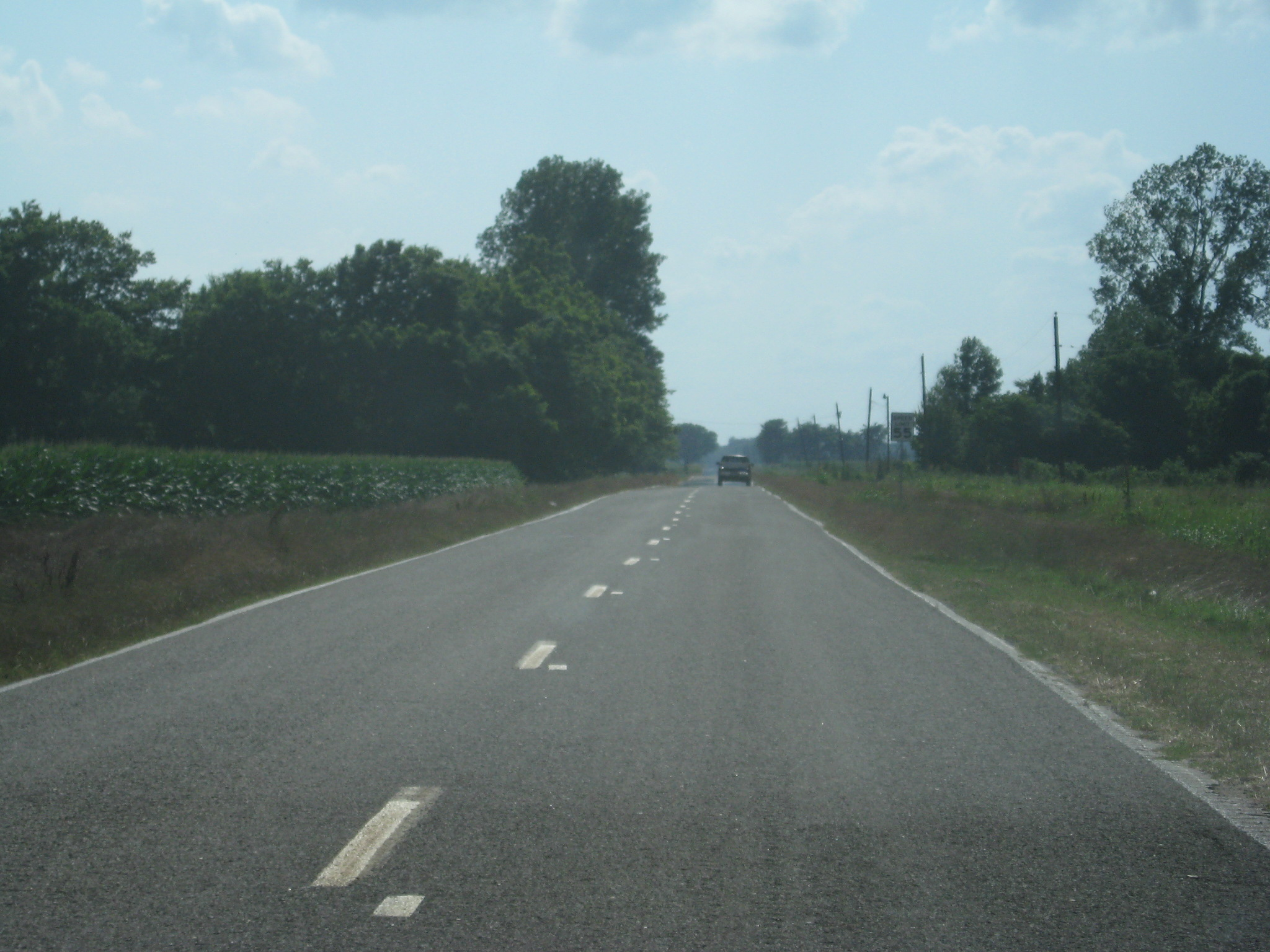
Eastbound on SH-87 just west of the Arkansas state line

SH-87 begins at an intersection with US-259 near the unincorporated community of Harris, about 1 mile (1.6 km) from the Red River. SH-87 heads east from here, proceeding along many curves. The highway is two-lane for its entire length, and much of it is very narrow with no shoulders (though a short stretch of highway that was realigned to approach a new girder bridge that replaced an old through truss bridge was built with shoulders). The highway crosses no major rivers, but does bridge Walnut Bayou. SH-87 ends at the Arkansas state line, where it becomes Arkansas Highway 108.

SH-87 is shown on the Oklahoma state highway map as concurrent with US-259 to at least Idabel. However, this is an error, as the highway is only signed from US-259 to the Arkansas state line, and is shown on ODOT's internal control section maps as ending at US-259.

== History ==
State Highway 87 first appeared on the June 1944 state highway map. When it was originally commissioned, the highway was a spur route; its western end was in Idabel, and its eastern end was approximately the location of the present-day US-259–SH-87 intersection. Towards the end of its route, SH-87 served Harris.

By 1948, SH-87 was extended, setting its eastern terminus at its present location at the Arkansas state line. However, this terminus proved to be temporary at first, as the highway was rerouted to turn north to end at SH-21 (now SH-3) in Tom in 1952. However, by 1957, the state line terminus had been reestablished, and SH-87 has ended there to the present day.

In the early 1960s, SH-87's length was at its zenith, as the highway stretched from Idabel to the Arkansas state line. However, on 1963-01-07, US-259 was established. The section of SH-87 from Idabel through Harris was turned over to the new U.S. route, setting the western terminus of the highway to its present-day location.

== Junction list ==
County	Location	mi	km	Destinations	Notes
McCurtain		0.00	0.00	US 259	Western terminus
Oklahoma–Arkansas state line		14.58	23.46	AR 108 continues east into Arkansas	
1.000 mi = 1.609 km; 1.000 km = 0.621 mi
