= Arkansas Highway 108 =

State highway in Arkansas, United States

Highway 108

Route information
- Maintained by ArDOT

Northern segment
- Length: 26.09 mi (41.99 km)
- West end: SH-87 southwest of Foreman
- East end: US 59 / US 71 in Ashdown

Southern segment
- Length: 6.96 mi (11.20 km)
- West end: US 59 / US 71
- East end: US 67 near Texarkana

Location
- Country: United States
- State: Arkansas
- Counties: Little River, Miller

Highway system
- Arkansas Highway System; Interstate; US; State; Business; Spurs; Suffixed; Scenic; Heritage
← AR 107	→ AR 109

Highway 108 (AR 108, Ark. 108, and Hwy. 108) is a state highway composed of two segments in the southwestern corner of the U.S. state of Arkansas. The northern segment begins as a continuation of State Highway 87 near the extreme southeastern corner of Oklahoma. The northern segment ends at U.S. Highway 59 and U.S. Highway 71 at Ashdown. The southern segment begins 13 miles (21 km) to the south along US 59 / US 71, at the Texas state line. The route ends at U.S. Highway 67 northeast of Texarkana.

== Route description ==
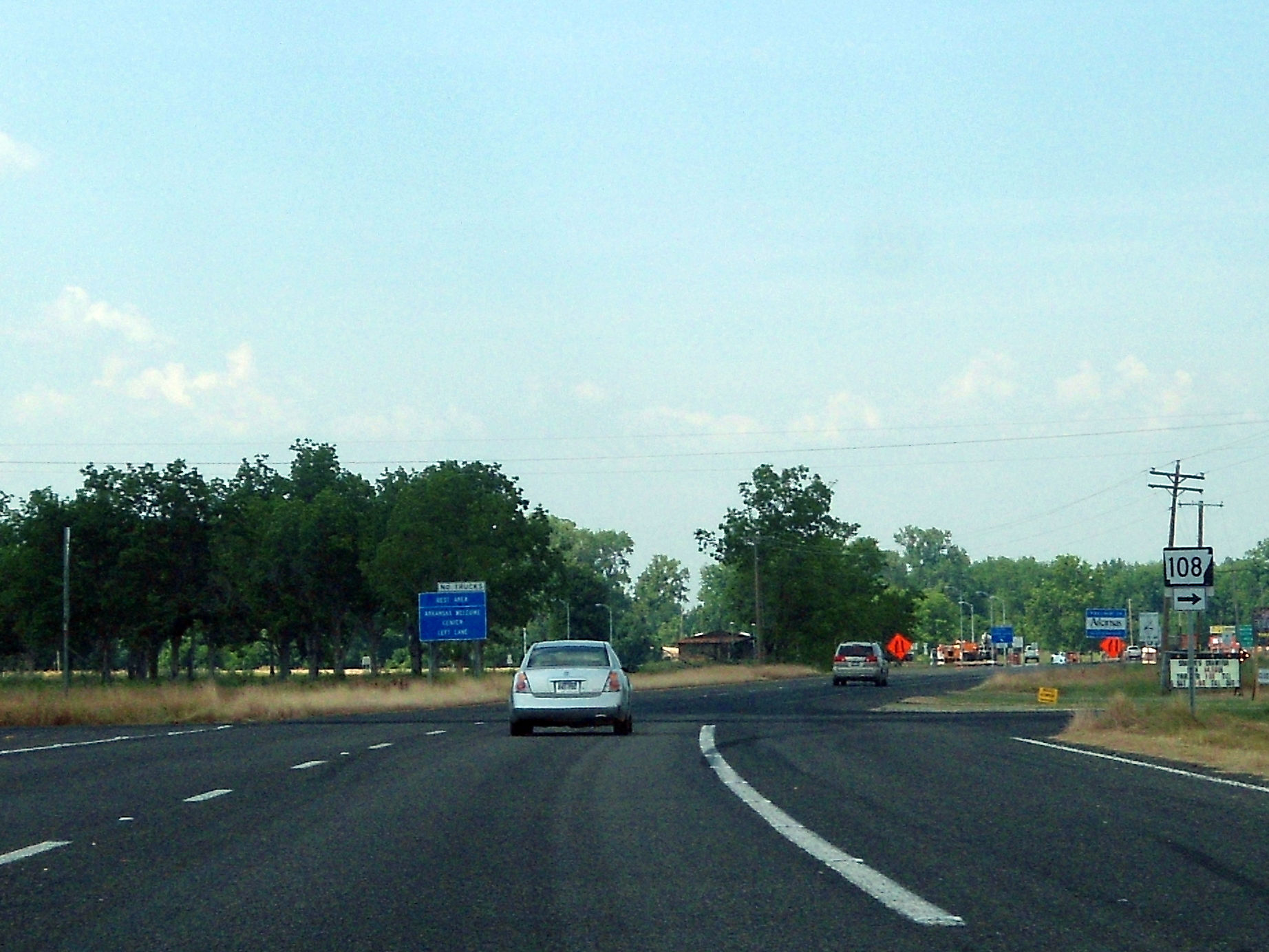
Highway 108 western terminus at US 59/US 71. This junction is entirely in Texas.

The Northern segment of Highway 108 begins at the Oklahoma state line as a continuation of State Highway 87. It heads to the northeast through Little River County towards Foreman. On the southern edge of Foreman, a spur route, Highway 108S, splits off to the south to intersect Highway 32 / Highway 41 and Highway 108 turns to the north. At Highway 32, which is Tracy Lawrence Avenue at this location, Highway 108 turns to the east and follows Highway 32. At Highway 41, known as Madden Street in Foreman, Highway 32 turns to the south and Highway 108 continues east.

East of Foreman, Highway 108 continues to the northeast towards Alleene. South of Alleene, the route intersects Highway 234 at a four-way stop. All traffic at this intersection must turn to stay on the same numbered route; Highway 108 represents the western and southern branches and Highway 234 represents the northern and eastern branches. Now heading south and east, Highway 108 travels 10 miles (16 km) to U.S. Highway 59 / U.S. Highway 71 north of Ashdown.

The southern segment of Highway 108, in Miller County, serves as a northern bypass of Texarkana. It intersects Interstate 30 at its exit 7. One half-mile (0.8 km) later, Highway 108 ends at U.S. Highway 67.

== Major intersections ==
State	County	Location	mi	km	Destinations	Notes
Arkansas	Little River		0.00	0.00	SH-87 west	Continuation into Oklahoma
Arkansas	Little River	Rocky Comfort	5.8	9.3	AR 108S	
Arkansas	Little River	Foreman	7.0	11.3	AR 32 west	West end of AR 32 overlap
Arkansas	Little River	Foreman	7.6	12.2	AR 32 east / AR 41	East end of AR 32 overlap
Arkansas	Little River		15.9	25.6	AR 234 – Wilton, Alleene	
Arkansas	Little River				I-49	proposed
Arkansas	Little River	Ashdown	26.6	42.8	US 71 / US 59 – De Queen, Ashdown	
Gap in route
Texas	Bowie		0.00	0.00	US 59 / US 71 – Texarkana, Ashdown	
Arkansas	Miller		6.5	10.5	I-30 – Texarkana, Little Rock	Exit 7 on I-30
Arkansas	Miller		7.0	11.3	US 67 – Fulton, Mandeville	Eastern terminus
1.000 mi = 1.609 km; 1.000 km = 0.621 mi: Concurrency terminus; Unopened

== Foreman spur ==
Highway 108S
- Location: Foreman
- Length: 0.77 mi (1,240 m)

Highway 108 Spur (AR 108S, Ark. 108S, and Hwy. 108S) is a short, east–west highway in Little River County in southwest Arkansas. Running only 0.77 miles (1.24 km) in length, its western terminus is at an intersection with Highway 108 6 miles (9.7 km) west of the Oklahoma state line. Its eastern terminus is at an intersection with Highway 41 1 mile (1.6 km) south of Foreman.

== See also ==
- List of state highways in Arkansas
