= Mineral Springs Saratoga School District =

School district in Arkansas

Mineral Springs / Saratoga School District

Location
- 130 West Browning Street; Mineral Springs, Arkansas 71851 United States

District information
- Grades: PK–12
- Accreditations: Arkansas Department of Education; AdvancED
- Schools: 4
- NCES District ID: 0509780

Students and staff
- Students: 527
- Teachers: 55.29 (on FTE basis)
- Staff: 113.29 (on FTE basis)
- Student–teacher ratio: 9.53
- District mascot: Hornet
- Colors: Green; Vegas Gold

Other information
- Website: www.msisd.net

Mineral Springs Saratoga School District is a public school district based in Mineral Springs, Arkansas, United States. The school district encompasses 203.23 square miles (526.4 km^{2}) of land, including portions of Hempstead County and Howard County serving communities such as Mineral Springs, Saratoga, Lockesburg, Tollette, Nashville, Fulton, Washington, Ozan, McNab.

The district proves comprehensive education for more than 500 pre-kindergarten through grade 12 students while employing more than 110 teachers and staff. The district and its four schools are accredited by the Arkansas Department of Education (ADE) and AdvancED (formerly North Central Association).

== History ==
The district formed on July 1, 2004 as a result of consolidation of the Mineral Springs School District and Saratoga (Special) School District. In 1966 the two districts absorbed portions of the Howard County Training School District.

On September 14, 2012, the school board voted to immediately close the Saratoga High School when it was discovered it did not offer the required 38 courses that all Arkansas high schools must provide.

== Schools ==
Secondary schools

- Mineral Springs High School, located in Mineral Springs, Howard County, and serving more than 150 students in grades 7 through 12.
- Saratoga High School, located in Saratoga, Hempstead County; closed in fall 2012.

Elementary schools

- Mineral Springs Elementary School, serving more than 200 students in pre-kindergarten through grade 6.
- Saratoga Elementary School, serving more than 100 students in pre-kindergarten through grade 6.
