= Foreman High School =

Foreman High School may refer to:

- Foreman High School (Arkansas) - Foreman, Arkansas
- Foreman High School (Chicago) - Chicago, Illinois
