= Corinth, Arkansas (disambiguation) =

Corinth, Arkansas may refer to the following places in Arkansas:

- Corinth, Arkansas, a town in Yell County
- Corinth, Howard County, Arkansas, an unincorporated community
