= Yarborough Landing, Arkansas =

- Census-designated place
- Location in Little River County, Arkansas

- Location within Arkansas Location within the United States
- Coordinates: 33°42′40″N 94°00′18″W
- Country: United States
- State: Arkansas
- County: Little River

Area
  - Total: 2.18 sq mi (5.64 km^{2})
  - Land: 2.17 sq mi (5.61 km^{2})
  - Water: 0.012 sq mi (0.03 km^{2})
- Elevation: 289 ft (88 m)

Population (2020)
  - Total: 457
  - Density: 210.9/sq mi (81.43/km^{2})
- Time zone: UTC-6 (Central (CST))
  - Summer (DST): UTC-5 (CDT)
- Area code: 870
- GNIS feature ID: 2582925
- FIPS code: 05-77203

Yarborough Landing is a census-designated place in Little River County, Arkansas, United States. Per the 2020 census, the population was 457.

== Geography ==
The community is in northeastern Little River County, on the southwest shore of Millwood Lake, a reservoir on the Little River. It is 11 miles (18 km) northeast of Ashdown, the county seat, and 13 miles (21 km) by road southwest of Saratoga. Arkansas Highway 317 has its northern terminus in Yarborough Landing and leads south 3 miles (5 km) to Arkansas Highway 32, the road connecting Ashdown and Saratoga.

According to the U.S. Census Bureau, the Yarborough Landing CDP has a total area of 2.2 square miles (5.8 km^{2}), of which 0.01 square miles (0.03 km^{2}), or 0.52%, are water.

== Demographics ==
Historical population
Census	Pop.	Note	%±
2010	487		—
2020	457		−6.2%
U.S. Decennial Census; 2010 2020

=== 2020 census ===
Yarborough Landing CDP, Arkansas – Racial and ethnic composition Note: the US Census treats Hispanic/Latino as an ethnic category. This table excludes Latinos from the racial categories and assigns them to a separate category. Hispanics/Latinos may be of any race.
Race / Ethnicity (NH = Non-Hispanic)	Pop 2010	Pop 2020	% 2010	% 2020
White alone (NH)	460	413	94.46%	90.37%
Black or African American alone (NH)	7	9	1.44%	1.97%
Native American or Alaska Native alone (NH)	10	3	2.05%	0.66%
Asian alone (NH)	0	0	0.00%	0.00%
Pacific Islander alone (NH)	0	0	0.00%	0.00%
Some Other Race alone (NH)	2	0	0.41%	0.00%
Mixed Race or Multi-Racial (NH)	1	27	0.21%	5.91%
Hispanic or Latino (any race)	7	5	1.44%	1.09%
Total	487	457	100.00%	100.00%
