= Saratoga, Arkansas =

- Census-designated place
- Location within Arkansas Location within the United States
- Coordinates: 33°45′06″N 93°54′18″W
- Country: United States
- State: Arkansas
- County: Hempstead, Howard
- Elevation: 407 ft (124 m)

Population (2020)
  - Total: 124
- Time zone: UTC-6 (Central (CST))
  - Summer (DST): UTC-5 (CDT)
- ZIP code: 71859
- Area code: 870
- GNIS feature ID: 2805684

Saratoga is an unincorporated community and census-designated place (CDP) in Hempstead and Howard counties, Arkansas, United States. Per the 2020 census, the population was 124.

Saratoga is located at the junction of Arkansas highways 32, 73 and 355, 5 miles (8.0 km) south of Tollette. Saratoga has a post office with ZIP code 71859.

Residents are served by the Mineral Springs Saratoga School District. On July 1, 2004, the Saratoga School District consolidated into the Mineral Springs School District. The local high school is currently Mineral Springs High School; the district previously operated Saratoga High School until its 2012 closure.

== Demographics ==
Historical population
Census	Pop.	Note	%±
2020	124		—
U.S. Decennial Census; 2020

=== 2020 census ===
Saratoga CDP, Arkansas – Racial and ethnic composition Note: the US Census treats Hispanic/Latino as an ethnic category. This table excludes Latinos from the racial categories and assigns them to a separate category. Hispanics/Latinos may be of any race.
Race / Ethnicity (NH = Non-Hispanic)	Pop 2020	% 2020
White alone (NH)	72	58.06%
Black or African American alone (NH)	38	30.65%
Native American or Alaska Native alone (NH)	0	0.00%
Asian alone (NH)	2	1.61%
Native Hawaiian or Pacific Islander alone (NH)	0	0.00%
Other race alone (NH)	0	0.00%
Mixed race or Multiracial (NH)	7	5.65%
Hispanic or Latino (any race)	5	4.03%
Total	124	100.00%
