= Columbus Presbyterian Church =

Historic church in Arkansas, United States

- Formerly listed on the U.S. National Register of Historic Places
- Location within Arkansas Location within the United States
- Location: AR 73, Columbus, Arkansas
- Coordinates: 33°46′42″N 93°49′3″W
- Area: less than one acre
- Built: 1875
- Architectural style: Greek Revival
- NRHP reference No.: 82000823

Significant dates
- Added to NRHP: November 17, 1982
- Removed from NRHP: June 12, 2013

The Columbus Presbyterian Church was a historic church on Arkansas Highway 73 in Columbus, Arkansas.

The church was built in 1875 and added to the National Register of Historic Places in 1982. It was destroyed by a falling tree in 2008, and removed from the National Register in 2013.

== See also ==
- National Register of Historic Places listings in Hempstead County, Arkansas
