= Saratoga High School =

Saratoga High School may refer to:

- Saratoga High School (Arkansas) in Saratoga, Arkansas
- Saratoga High School (California) in Saratoga, California
- Saratoga Springs High School in Saratoga Springs, New York
