= Arkansas Highway 73 =

State highway in Arkansas, United States

Highway 73

Route information
- Maintained by ArDOT
- Existed: 1926–present

Section 1
- Length: 18.59 mi (29.92 km)
- From: AR 355
- To: US 278

Section 2
- Length: 12.37 mi (19.91 km)
- From: US 67, Hope
- To: AR 53

Location
- Country: United States
- State: Arkansas
- Counties: Hempstead, Howard, Nevada

Highway system
- Arkansas Highway System; Interstate; US; State; Business; Spurs; Suffixed; Scenic; Heritage
← AR 72	→ AR 74

Arkansas Highway 73 (AR 73 and Hwy. 73) is a designation for two state highways in South Arkansas. The western route of 18.59 miles (29.92 km) runs from US 278 north to Highway 355. An eastern alignment runs 18.59 miles (29.92 km) from US 67 in east Hope to Arkansas Highway 53.

== Route description ==
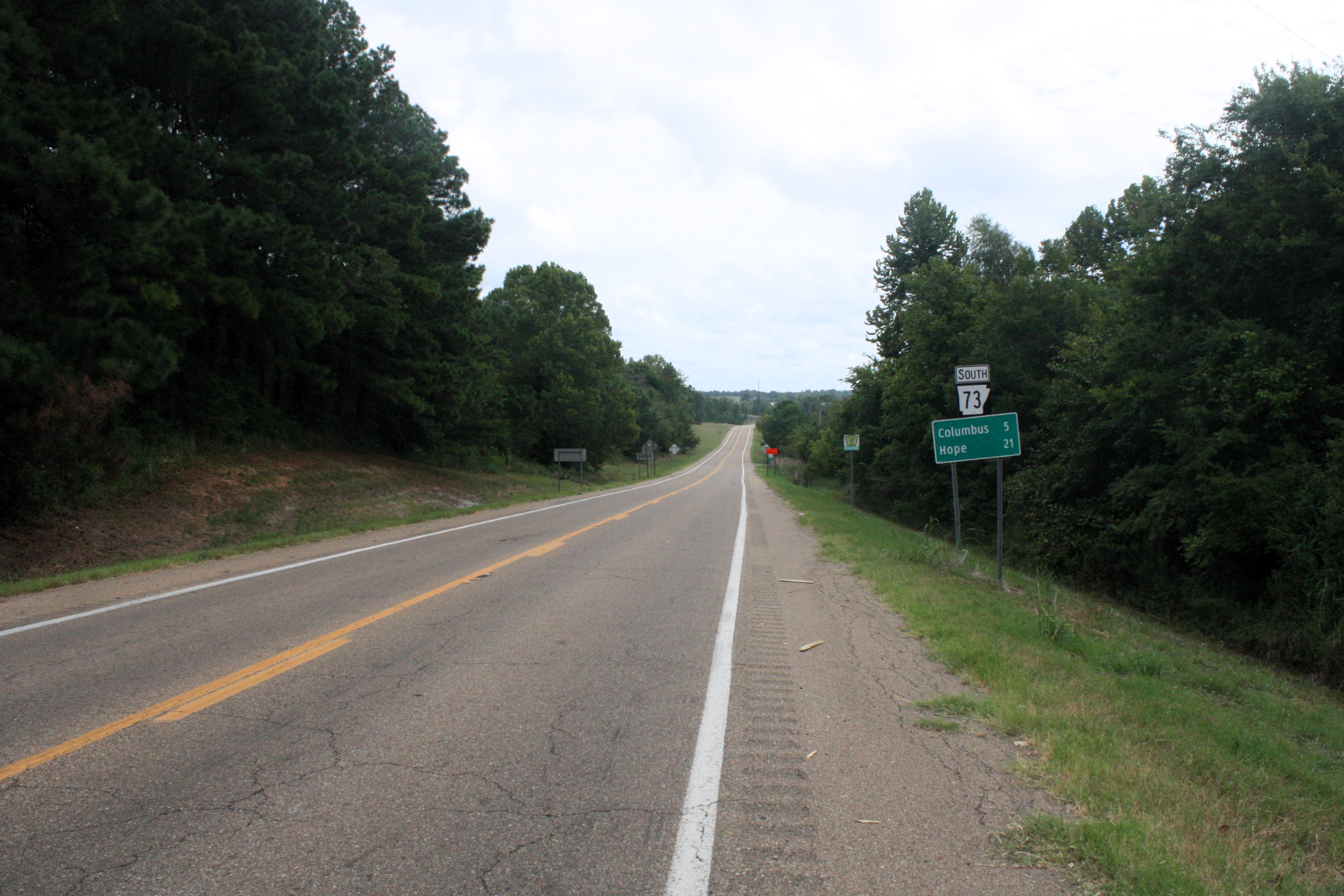
First reassurance marker for AR 73 after the AR 355 junction in Hempstead County

=== Western segment ===
Highway 73 begins in Hempstead County at Highway 355 near Millwood Lake, close to the Howard County line. The route briefly enters Howard County before reentering Hempstead County near Columbus and the Columbus Presbyterian Church. Highway 73 runs along the southern border of the Rick Evans Grandview Prairie Wildlife Management Area past the Grandison D. Royston House before intersecting Highway 195 at Cross Roads. The route continues further southeast through rural country before terminating at US 278.

The route is a low traffic road with less than 1000 vehicles per day (VPD) from its western terminus to the junction with Highway 195. East of the intersection the Average daily traffic (ADT) increases to about 1300 VPD (as of 2010).

=== Eastern segment ===
The route begins at US 67 in the eastern portion of Hope. Highway 73 runs east through Rocky Mound into Nevada County. The route runs only briefly in the county before terminating at Highway 53. The route is two–lane undivided for its entire length.

The route begins with an average of 2400 vehicles per day from US 67 in Hope to the intersection with Lake Shore Street, which provides access to William Jefferson Clinton Primary School (as of 2010). East of the school the route's ADT drops to approximately 900 VPD; ADT drops further to 120 VPD upon entering Nevada County.

== History ==

Highway 73 was an original 1926 state highway, which is the first year Arkansas numbered its highways in a traditional format. The route ran from Highway 55 near Albrook east to Highway 4 in Hope, and was mostly graveled. Highway 55 was renumbered to Highway 355 around 1958 in anticipation of Interstate 55 in northeast Arkansas. This is due to Arkansas conventions to only use each number once among Interstates, US highways, and state highways. Highway 4 was replaced by US 278 across the state in 1998.

== Major intersections ==
County	Location	mi	km	Destinations	Notes
Nevada		12.37	19.91	AR 53 – Prescott, Stamps	
Hempstead	Hope	0.00	0.00	US 67	
Hempstead	Gap in route				
Hempstead		18.59	29.92	US 278 – Airport	
Hempstead	Cross Roads	12.03	19.36	AR 195 – Fulton, Washington	
Howard	No major junctions				
Hempstead	Saratoga	0.00	0.00	AR 355 – Fulton, Mineral Springs, Millwood State Park	
1.000 mi = 1.609 km; 1.000 km = 0.621 mi

== See also ==
- List of state highways in Arkansas
