= Paul Gibson (end) =

American gridiron football player (1924–1999)

- Gibson in 1946

No. 52
- Positions: End, quarterback, defensive end

Personal information
- Born: August 25, 1924; Winston-Salem, North Carolina, U.S.
- Died: August 11, 1999 (aged 74); Charleston, South Carolina, U.S.
- Listed height: 6 ft 2 in (1.88 m)
- Listed weight: 195 lb (88 kg)

Career information
- High school: Mineral Springs (NC)
- College: NC State
- NFL draft: 1947: 10th round, 78th overall pick

Career history
- Buffalo Bills (1947–1949); Ottawa Rough Riders (1950); Hamilton Tiger-Cats (1951)

Awards and highlights
- First-team All-SoCon (1946)

Career NFL statistics
- Games: 30
- Stats at Pro Football Reference

Paul Edward "Spider" Gibson (August 25, 1924 – August 11, 1999) was an American professional football player who played at the end, quarterback, and defensive end positions. He played college football for NC State and professional football for the Buffalo Bills, Ottawa Rough Riders, and Hamilton Tiger-Cats.

== Early life ==
Gibson was born in 1924 in Winston-Salem, North Carolina. He attended and played football at Mineral Springs High School in Mineral Springs, North Carolina.

== College football and military service ==
Gibson played college football for NC State from 1943 to 1946. He also served in the United States Army.

== Professional football ==
He was selected by the Pittsburgh Steelers in the 1947 NFL draft and by the Buffalo Bills in the 1947 AAFC Draft. He played in the All-America Football Conference (AAFC) for the Bills for three seasons from 1947 to 1949. He appeared in 30 AAFC games and caught 22 passes for 402 yards while also intercepting a pass on defense. He also played in the Canadian Football League (CFL) for the Ottawa Rough Riders in 1950 and for the Hamilton Tiger-Cats in 1951. He appeared in 23 CFL games.

== Family and later years ==
Gibson died in 1999 at age 74 in Charleston, South Carolina.
