= James T. Horn =

American country music singer (born 1966)

- Born: August 29, 1966 (age 59); Foreman, Arkansas
- Genres: Country
- Occupation: Singer
- Instrument: Guitar
- Years active: 1996–1997
- Labels: Curb/Universal

James T. Horn (born August 29, 1966 in Foreman, Arkansas) is an American country music singer. Horn recorded an album for Curb/Universal in 1997 produced by Wynn Jackson and Steve Keller. A dance mix of the song "If My Heart Had an Ass (I'd Kick It)" was released to clubs to introduce him.

Horn's first radio single, "If Dreams Have Wings", was released on October 29, 1996. Deborah Evans Price of Billboard gave the song a favorable review, writing that "Horn has a very traditional voice, and his catch-in-the-throat delivery perfectly suits the heartfelt lyric." His second single, "Geronimo", was released on September 23, 1997. A music video for the song was directed by Steven R. Monroe and aired on CMT. Its B-side, "Texas Diary", peaked at number 72 on the Billboard Hot Country Singles & Tracks chart.

== Discography ==
=== Singles ===
Year	Single	Peak positions
Year	Single	US Country
1996	"If Dreams Have Wings"	—
1997	"Geronimo"	—
1997	"Texas Diary"	72
2016	"Glory Bound Train"	—
"—" denotes releases that did not chart

=== Music videos ===
Year	Video	Director
1997	"Geronimo"	Steven R. Monroe
