= Comet, Arkansas =

Unincorporated community in Arkansas, US

Coordinates: 33°41′02″N 94°14′37″W

Comet is an unincorporated community in Little River County, Arkansas, United States.
