= Will Reed Farm House =

Historic house in Arkansas, United States

- U.S. National Register of Historic Places
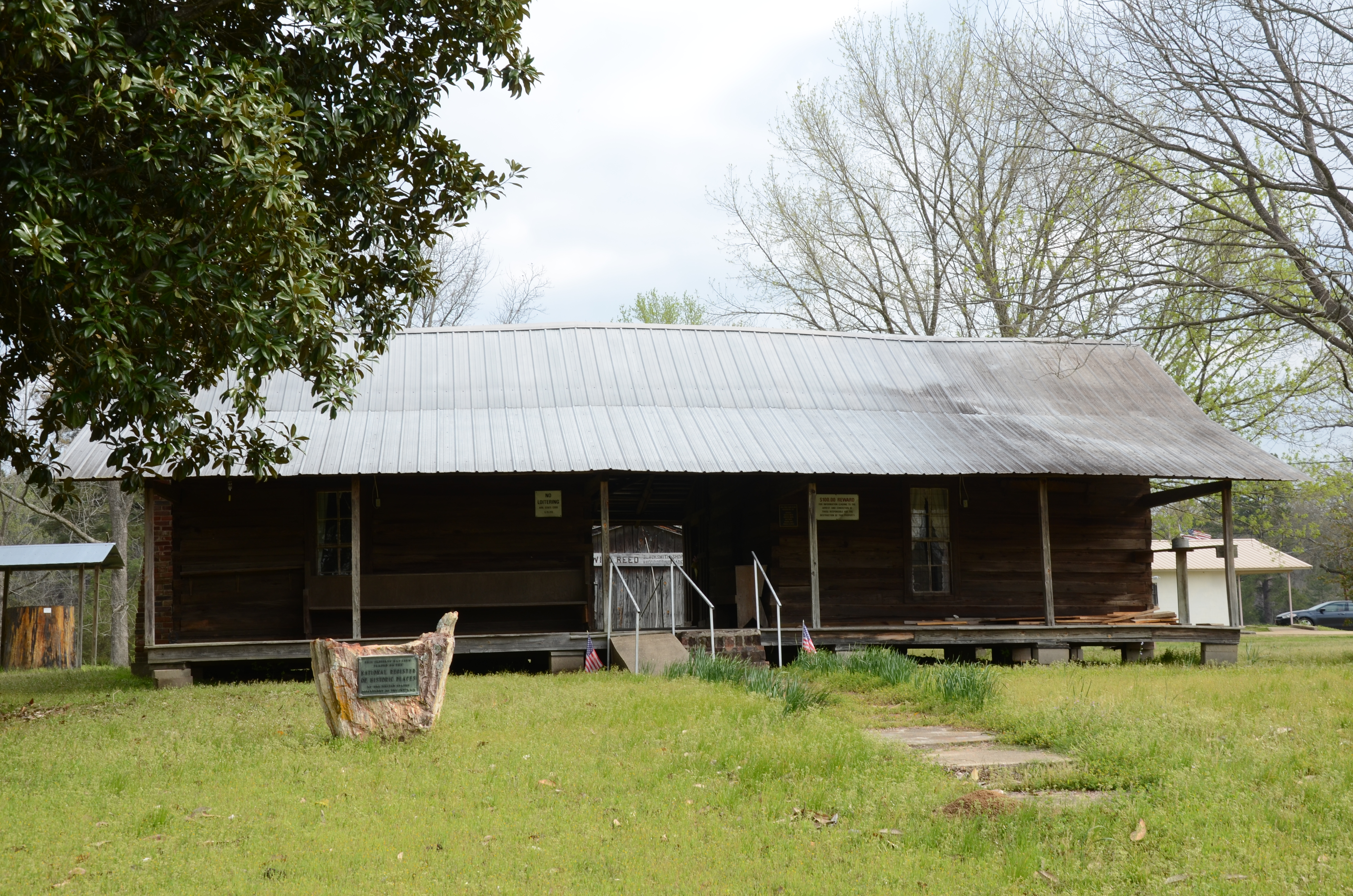

- Location within Arkansas Location within the United States
- Location: Main St., Alleene, Arkansas
- Coordinates: 33°46′20″N 94°15′36″W
- Area: 0.5 acres (0.20 ha)
- Built: 1895
- Architect: J.D. Abney
- NRHP reference No.: 78000606
- Added to NRHP: July 14, 1978

The Will Reed Farm House is a historic farmhouse on Main Street in Alleene, Arkansas.

== Description and history ==
It is a single-story dog trot log structure, built c. 1895 by J. D. Abney. In 1902 it was bought by Will Reed, who lived there for fifty years. The house is now owned by the Little River County Historical Society, which operates it as a historical museum. The house was moved from its original location approximately 1 mile (1.6 km) to its present location and there was rehabilitative replacement of its front porch and other parts.

The house was listed on the National Register of Historic Places in 1978.

== See also ==
- National Register of Historic Places listings in Little River County, Arkansas
