= Rogerline Johnson =

American photographer (1927–1996)

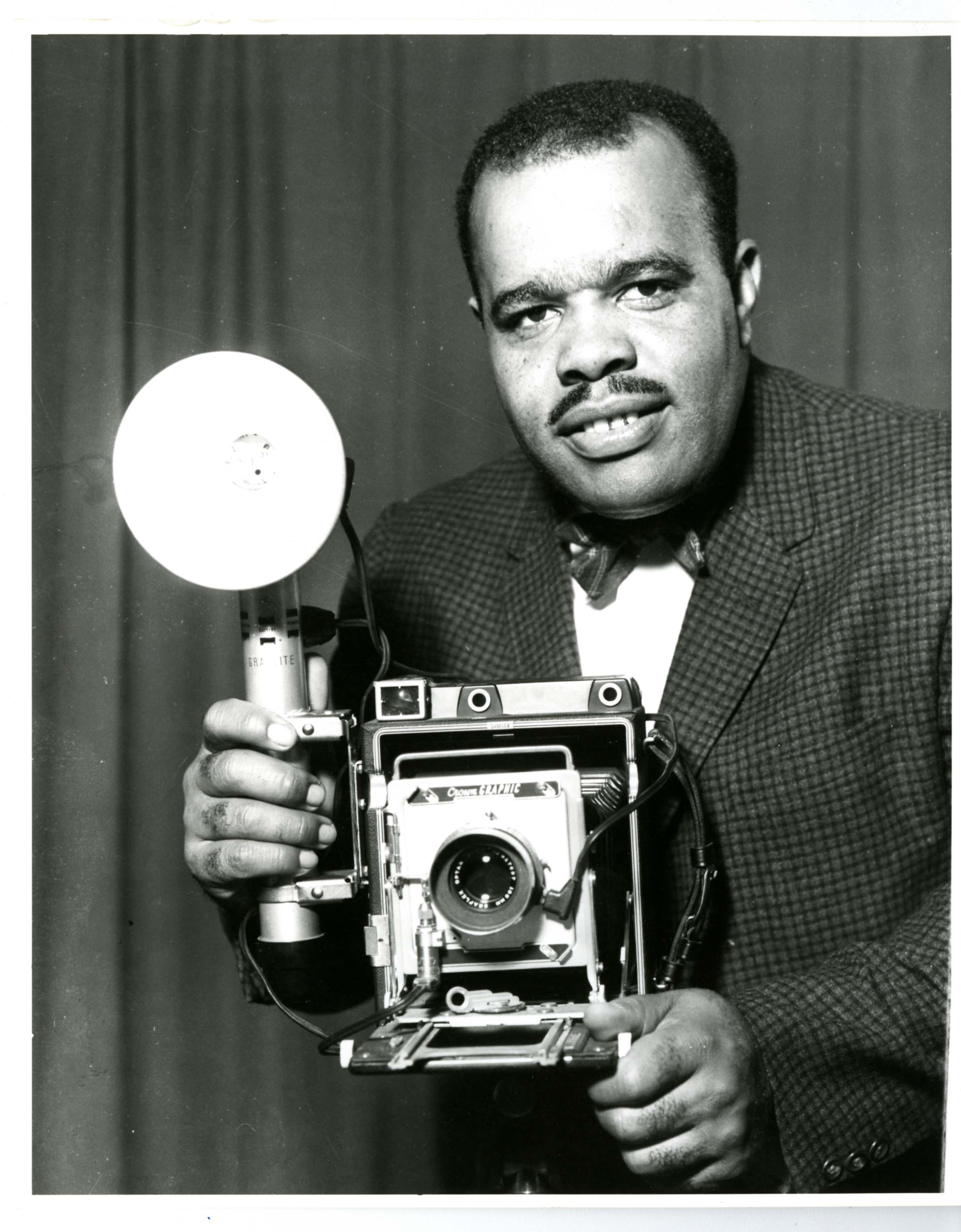
- Born: November 15, 1927; Hempstead County, Arkansas, US
- Died: October 10, 1996 (aged 68); Helena, Arkansas, US
- Occupation: Photographer

Rogerline Johnson Sr. (November 15, 1927 – October 10, 1996) was an American photographer. He photographed African American life in the Arkansas Delta.

== Biography ==
Johnson was born on November 15, 1927, in either Hope or Columbus, Arkansas, both in Hempstead County. In 1948, he graduated from the University of Arkansas at Pine Bluff. After graduating, he became a science teacher between Marianna and Lake View High Schools; he also coached football and basketball. He quit teaching to pursue photography.

Johnson taught himself photography. From 1952 until his death, he operated a photography studio in Helena. He photographed African American people and culture throughout the Arkansas Delta, primarily in the communities of Elaine, Helena–West Helena, Lake View, and Marianna. Between 1952 and 1971, he took approximately 25,000 black and white negatives, which were archived. He was also a bandleader, with a marker in Helena, erected 2009, covering blues music featuring some of his photographs.

Johnson married Ludie Johnson c. 1952; they had seven children together, including Rogerline Johnson Jr., a member of Helena City Council. He died on October 10, 1996, aged 68, in Helena. Following his death, he was commemorated by the Mayor of Helena. He was buried at the Jackson Memorial Cemetery.

Johnson's photography studio continued operation after his death. In 2004, a photography exhibition entitled "African American Life in the Arkansas Delta: Through the Lens of Rogerline Johnson, 1952-1971" was hosted. It was supported by the Arkansas Delta African American Historical Society and the University of Arkansas at Pine Bluff Department of Art and Design. The exhibition premiered at the University of Arkansas at Pine Bluff, and featured 120 photographs by Johnson; later exhibitions featured 30 photographs.
