= Foreman High School (Arkansas) =

Location
- 700 Rocky Comfort Street; Foreman, Arkansas 71836; United States; 33°42′46″N 94°23′37″W

Information
- Type: Public secondary
- Motto: Forming a Habit of Success
- School district: Foreman School District
- NCES District ID: 0506240
- CEEB code: 040795
- NCES School ID: 050624000338
- Principal: Richard McMillan
- Faculty: 34.77 (on FTE basis)
- Grades: 7 to 12
- Student to teacher ratio: 6.36
- Colors: Maroon and white
- Athletics conference: 2A 7AA (2012-14)
- Mascot: Gator
- USNWR ranking: 12th (AR); 1617th (USA)
- Website: www.foremanschools.org/page/foreman-high-school

Foreman High School is a secondary school in Foreman, Arkansas, United States. The school is the only secondary school serving grades 7 through 12 in the Foreman School District and is one of two public high schools in Little River County, Arkansas.

Foreman High school was first recognized as Rocky Comfort High School until 1914 when it changed to Foreman High School.

In 2012, Foreman was nationally recognized with the Silver Award in the U.S. News & World Report Best High Schools ranking report as the No. 12 school in the state and No. 1,617 in the nation. The school is accredited by AdvancED since 1964.

== Academics ==
The assumed course of study follows the Smart Core curriculum developed by the Arkansas Department of Education (ADE), which requires students to complete at least 22 units to graduate. Students complete regular (core and career focus) courses and exams and may select Advanced Placement (AP) coursework and exams that provide an opportunity for college credit prior to high school graduation. The school is accredited by AdvancED (formerly North Central Association) since 1964 and by the ADE. Foreman High School was awarded High Achieving High School For Region for overall highest grades in math and ELA based on the Parcc assessment test in the 2014–2015 school year.

== Extracurricular activities ==
The Foreman High School mascot is the Gators with maroon and white serving as its school colors. For 2017–18, the Foreman Gators compete in the 2A Region 7 Conference under the administration of the Arkansas Activities Association (AAA). Interscholastic activities include football, basketball (boys/girls), cheer, golf (boys/girls), baseball, softball, track (boys/girls) and the Foreman High Steppers.

- Softball: The fast-pitch softball team has won a state-record number of state championships by capturing six consecutive titles between 2006 and 2011. The Foreman High School fast-pitch team added a seventh state title in 2014 and made the semi-finals in 2015 and 2016.
- Track and field: The boys track team are 2-time state track and field champions (1969, 1990). The girls track team are 3-time state track and field champions (1989, 1993, 1994).

== Notable alumni ==
- Marshall Wright, Democratic member of the Arkansas House of Representatives for St. Francis County since 2011
