= Rocky Comfort, Arkansas =

Unincorporated community in Arkansas, US

Coordinates: 33°42′18″N 94°24′21″W

Rocky Comfort is an unincorporated community in Little River County, Arkansas, United States. The community is located on Arkansas Highway 108 just southwest of Foreman. The community was also known as Willow Springs.

== History ==
A post office was established at Rocky Comfort in 1846, and remained in operation until it was discontinued in 1901. Rocky Comfort was the birthplace of Arkansas governor Jeff Davis.
