= Foreman School District =

School district in Arkansas

Location
- 418 South Bell Street; Foreman, Arkansas 71836 United States

District information
- Grades: K–12
- Accreditation: ADE
- Schools: 2
- NCES District ID: 0502580

Students and staff
- Students: 548
- Teachers: 41.06 (on FTE basis)
- Student–teacher ratio: 13.35
- District mascot: Gator
- Colors: Maroon White

Other information
- Website: www.foremanschools.org

Foreman School District is a public school district based in Foreman, Arkansas, United States. The Foreman School District provides early childhood, elementary and secondary education for more than 500 kindergarten through grade 12 students at its five facilities. Foreman School District is accredited by the Arkansas Department of Education (ADE).

== Schools ==
In 2012, Foreman High School was nationally recognized with the Silver Award in the U.S. News & World Report Best High Schools ranking report as the No. 12 school in the state and No. 1,617 in the nation. The high school has been accredited by AdvancED since 1964.

The district's two facilities include:

- Foreman High School—grades 7 through 12.
- Oscar Hamilton Elementary School—kindergarten through grade 6.

== See also ==
- Ashdown School District, also located in Little River County, Arkansas
