= Okay, Arkansas =

- Unincorporated community
- Location within Arkansas Location within the United States
- Coordinates: 33°46′03″N 93°55′27″W
- Country: United States
- State: Arkansas
- County: Howard
- Elevation: 318 ft (97 m)
- Time zone: UTC-6 (Central (CST))
  - Summer (DST): UTC-5 (CDT)
- GNIS feature ID: 58299

Okay is an unincorporated community in Howard County, Arkansas, United States.

The community was so named for the "OK" brand cement manufactured at a local cement plant.

== History ==
The initiating factor of the town was rich deposits of limestone and chalk, prompting a cement company to build the Arkansas Portland O.K. Cement plant which started production on October 2, 1929. The workers needed housing, and a company village of forty small homes was created, becoming officially the town of Okay when the post office opened on February 11, 1930. The facilities included shopping, church services in a meeting hall, a golf course, a baseball diamond, and other sports venues. The town even had a semi-professional baseball team, the Okay Cementers, for a time beginning in May 1936. The team was highly regarded, and when Nashville, Arkansas opened a new lighted baseball park in July 1950, Okay’s team beat Nashville’s.

At its height, the town had about 150 citizens. However, in the early 1960’s, the company began encouraging employees to live elsewhere, and town services began to be shut down including the local schools which had been operating since the time of the plant’s construction. By 1977, the town had only two citizens. After changes in ownership, the plant shut down in 1993, and within 5 years, the area was largely deserted.
