= Ogden, Arkansas =

- City
- Location of Ogden in Little River County, Arkansas
- Coordinates: 33°35′09″N 94°02′49″W
- Country: United States
- State: Arkansas
- County: Little River

Area
  - Total: 0.38 sq mi (0.99 km^{2})
  - Land: 0.38 sq mi (0.99 km^{2})
  - Water: 0 sq mi (0.00 km^{2})
- Elevation: 312 ft (95 m)

Population (2020)
  - Total: 131
  - Estimate (2025): 127 ▼
  - Density: 341.1/sq mi (131.69/km^{2})
- Time zone: UTC-6 (Central (CST))
  - Summer (DST): UTC-5 (CDT)
- ZIP code: 71853
- Area code: 870
- FIPS code: 05-51350
- GNIS feature ID: 2404422

Ogden is a city in Little River County, Arkansas, United States. As of the 2020 census, Ogden had a population of 131.

== Geography ==
Ogden is located in southeastern Little River County. U.S. Routes 59 and 71 pass through the city together as a four-lane divided highway, leading northwest 8 miles (13 km) to Ashdown, the county seat, and south 11 miles (18 km) to Texarkana.

According to the United States Census Bureau, Ogden has a total area of 0.4 square miles (1.0 km^{2}), all land. It is 1.5 miles (2.4 km) northeast of the Red River, which is the Texas–Arkansas border.

== Demographics ==
Historical population
Census	Pop.	Note	%±
1910	397		—
1930	305		—
1940	225		−26.2%
1950	296		31.6%
1960	282		−4.7%
1970	286		1.4%
1980	334		16.8%
1990	264		−21.0%
2000	214		−18.9%
2010	180		−15.9%
2020	131		−27.2%
2025 (est.)	127	▼	−3.1%
U.S. Decennial Census

As of the census of 2000, there were 214 people, 89 households, and 59 families residing in the city. The population density was 162.0/km^{2} (418.8/mi^{2}). There were 106 housing units at an average density of 80.2/km^{2} (207.4/mi^{2}). The racial makeup of the city was 76.64% Black or African American, 18.69% White, 0.47% Native American, 3.74% from other races, and 0.47% from two or more races. 6.07% of the population were Hispanic or Latino of any race.

There were 89 households, out of which 32.6% had children under the age of 18 living with them, 55.1% were married couples living together, 6.7% had a female householder with no husband present, and 32.6% were non-families. 31.5% of all households were made up of individuals, and 9.0% had someone living alone who was 65 years of age or older. The average household size was 2.40 and the average family size was 3.03.

In the city, the population was spread out, with 27.6% under the age of 18, 5.1% from 18 to 24, 28.5% from 25 to 44, 24.3% from 45 to 64, and 14.5% who were 65 years of age or older. The median age was 35 years. For every 100 females, there were 118.4 males. For every 100 females age 18 and over, there were 115.3 males.

The median income for a household in the city was $26,250, and the median income for a family was $31,250. Males had a median income of $27,500 versus $28,750 for females. The per capita income for the city was $12,118. About 6.0% of families and 8.0% of the population were below the poverty line, including 3.9% of those under the age of eighteen and 6.7% of those 65 or over.

== Notable person ==
- Earnest Rhone, former NFL linebacker for the Miami Dolphins
