= Mineral Springs High School =

Location
- 130 West Browning Street; Mineral Springs, Arkansas 71851; United States; 33°52′44″N 93°55′7″W

Information
- School type: Public
- School district: Mineral Springs Saratoga School District
- NCES District ID: 0509780
- Superintendent: Billy Lee
- CEEB code: 041670
- NCES School ID: 050978000717
- Principal: Jondavid Amerson
- Teaching staff: 36.43 (on FTE basis)
- Grades: 7–12
- Enrollment: 195 (2023-2024)
- Student to teacher ratio: 5.35
- Colors: Green and gold
- Mascot: Hornet
- Team name: Mineral Springs Hornets
- Affiliation: Arkansas Activities Association
- Website: www.msisd.net/14028_1

Mineral Springs High School is a comprehensive public high school in Mineral Springs, Arkansas, United States, that serves grades 7 through 12. It is one of three public high schools in Howard County and the only high school managed by the Mineral Springs Saratoga School District.

In September 2012, the school district's other high school, Saratoga High School, was closed after the state Board of Education discovered the high school did not provide the required 38 courses. As a result, students were merged into Mineral Springs High School.

== Academics ==
The assumed course of study is the Smart Core curriculum developed by the Arkansas Department of Education. Students may engage in regular and Advanced Placement (AP) coursework and exams prior to graduation. Mineral Springs has been accredited by AdvancED (formerly North Central Association) since 1998.

== Athletics ==
The Mineral Springs High School mascot is the Hornet with school colors of green and Vegas gold. The former Saratoga High School mascot was the Bulldog and the school colors were red and white.

For 2012–14, the Mineral Springs Hornets participate in the 2A Classification in the 2A-7 (football) and 2A-7 East (basketball) Conference for interscholastic activities administered by the Arkansas Activities Association (AAA) including football, golf (boys/girls), basketball (boys/girls), cheer, baseball, softball, and track and field.

In 2021, the Arkansas Activities Association announced a realignment of football conferences, with several teams changing conferences and moving classes. Mineral Springs went from class 2A conference 7 (2A-7) to 2A-3. Mineral Springs competes in class 1A in every sport other than football.

- Basketball: The Saratoga boys basketball team won consecutive state basketball championships in 1995 and 1996.
- Track and field: The Mineral Springs boys track teams are 8-time state track and field champions (1972, 1996, 1997, 1998, 1999, 2000, 2002, 2007). The Saratoga girls track teams won three state track and field championships in 1985, 1986 and 1988.
