= Little River County, Arkansas =

County in Arkansas, United States

- County
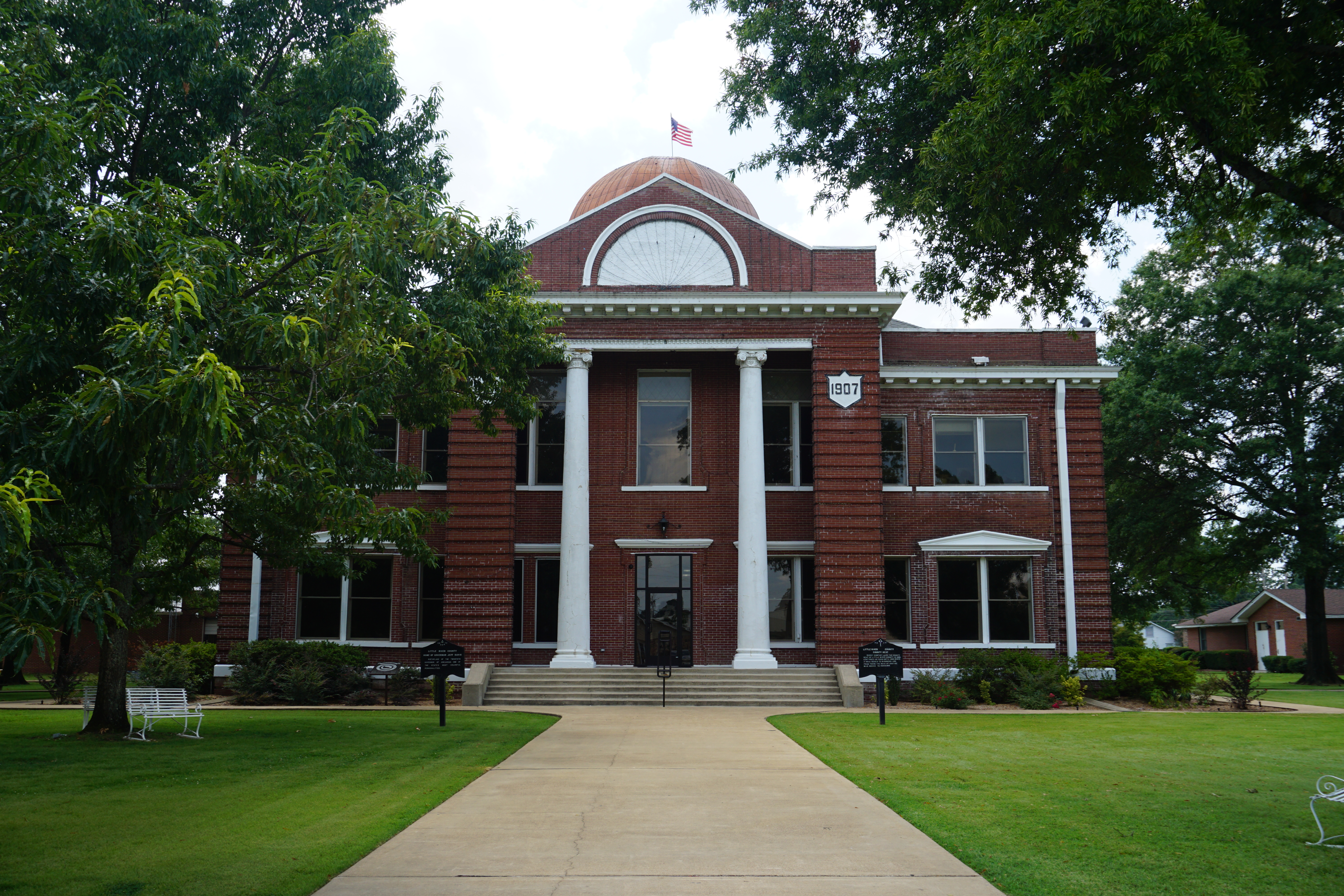
- Little River County Courthouse in Ashdown

- Location within the U.S. state of Arkansas
- Coordinates: 33°41′53″N 94°13′18″W
- Country: United States
- State: Arkansas
- Founded: March 5, 1867
- Named for: Little River
- Seat: Ashdown
- Largest city: Ashdown

Area
  - Total: 565 sq mi (1,460 km^{2})
  - Land: 532 sq mi (1,380 km^{2})
  - Water: 33 sq mi (85 km^{2}) 5.8%

Population (2020)
  - Total: 12,026
  - Estimate (2025): 11,763 ▼
  - Density: 22.6/sq mi (8.73/km^{2})
- Time zone: UTC−6 (Central)
  - Summer (DST): UTC−5 (CDT)
- Congressional district: 4th
- Website: lrcounty.org

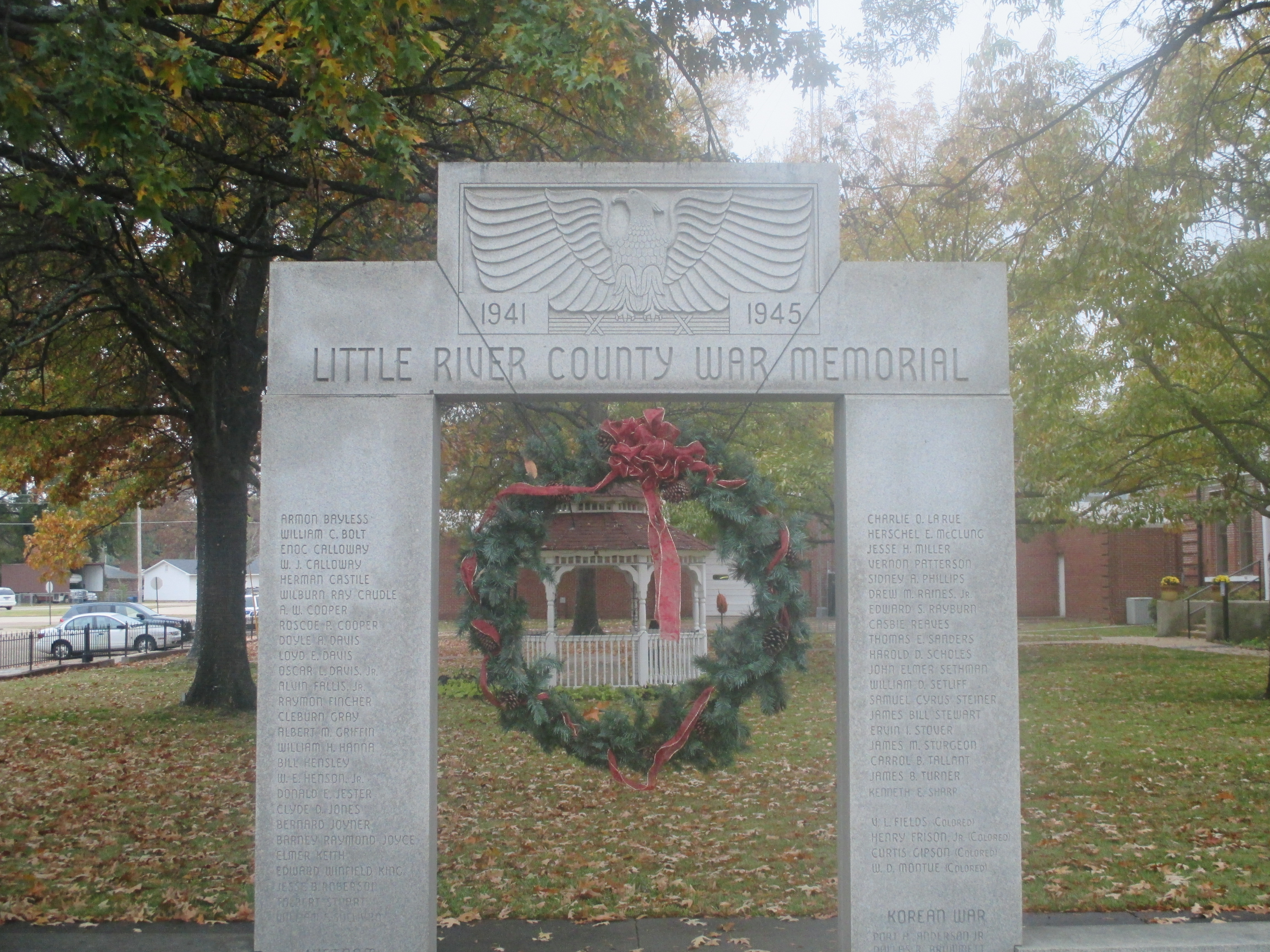
Little River County War Memorial during Christmas

Little River County is a county located on the southwest border of the U.S. state of Arkansas, bordering a corner with Texas and Oklahoma. As of the 2020 census, the population was 12,026. The county seat is Ashdown.

Little River County is included in the Texarkana metropolitan area.

== History ==
Little River County is Arkansas's 59th county, formed from Sevier County on March 5, 1867, during the Reconstruction era and named for the Little River. The county is separated from all other surrounding counties in the state by water (a characteristic shared only with neighboring Miller County). The Little River, Millwood Lake and the Red River form the boundaries of the county within the state.

Around 1895 the Arkansas and Choctaw Railway was built between Arkinda and Ashdown. The line was extended from Arkinda into Oklahoma, and from Ashdown to Hope, Arkansas, in the 1902-1903 timeframe. That line is now operated by the Kiamichi Railroad.

== Geography ==
According to the U.S. Census Bureau, the county has a total area of 565 square miles (1,460 km^{2}), of which 532 square miles (1,380 km^{2}) is land and 33 square miles (85 km^{2}) (5.8%) is water. It is the third-smallest county in Arkansas by land area and fourth-smallest by total area.

=== Major highways ===
- Future Interstate 49
- U.S. Highway 59 / U.S. Highway 71
- Highway 32
- Highway 41
- Highway 108
- Highway 234
- Highway 317
- Highway 380

=== Adjacent counties ===
- Sevier County (north)
- Howard County (northeast)
- Hempstead County (east)
- Miller County (southeast)
- Bowie County, Texas (south)
- McCurtain County, Oklahoma (west)

== Demographics ==
Historical population
Census	Pop.	Note	%±
1870	3,236		—
1880	6,404		97.9%
1890	8,903		39.0%
1900	13,731		54.2%
1910	13,597		−1.0%
1920	16,301		19.9%
1930	15,515		−4.8%
1940	15,932		2.7%
1950	11,690		−26.6%
1960	9,211		−21.2%
1970	11,194		21.5%
1980	13,952		24.6%
1990	13,966		0.1%
2000	13,628		−2.4%
2010	13,171		−3.4%
2020	12,026		−8.7%
2025 (est.)	11,763	▼	−2.2%
U.S. Decennial Census; 1790–1960 1900–1990; 1990–2000 2010

=== 2020 census ===
As of the 2020 census, the county had a population of 12,026. The median age was 44.6 years. 22.2% of residents were under the age of 18 and 22.1% of residents were 65 years of age or older. For every 100 females there were 96.9 males, and for every 100 females age 18 and over there were 93.5 males age 18 and over.

The racial makeup of the county was 72.5% White, 18.1% Black or African American, 1.4% American Indian and Alaska Native, 0.2% Asian, 0.1% Native Hawaiian and Pacific Islander, 1.4% from some other race, and 6.3% from two or more races. Hispanic or Latino residents of any race comprised 3.4% of the population.

<0.1% of residents lived in urban areas, while 100.0% lived in rural areas.

There were 5,098 households in the county, of which 28.3% had children under the age of 18 living in them. Of all households, 45.2% were married-couple households, 20.4% were households with a male householder and no spouse or partner present, and 28.8% were households with a female householder and no spouse or partner present. About 31.0% of all households were made up of individuals and 14.2% had someone living alone who was 65 years of age or older.

There were 6,043 housing units, of which 15.6% were vacant. Among occupied housing units, 73.0% were owner-occupied and 27.0% were renter-occupied. The homeowner vacancy rate was 1.3% and the rental vacancy rate was 9.4%.

=== 2000 census ===
As of the 2000 census, there were 13,628 people, 5,465 households, and 3,912 families residing in the county. The population density was 26 people per square mile (10 people/km^{2}). There were 6,435 housing units at an average density of 12 per square mile (4.6/km^{2}). The racial makeup of the county was 74.52% White, 21.27% Black or African American, 1.45% Native American, 0.20% Asian, 0.03% Pacific Islander, 0.86% from other races, and 1.67% from two or more races. 1.72% of the population were Hispanic or Latino of any race.

There were 5,465 households, out of which 31.40% had children under the age of 18 living with them, 55.60% were married couples living together, 12.30% had a female householder with no husband present, and 28.40% were non-families. 26.30% of all households were made up of individuals, and 12.00% had someone living alone who was 65 years of age or older. The average household size was 2.46 and the average family size was 2.95.

In the county, the population was spread out, with 25.20% under the age of 18, 8.40% from 18 to 24, 25.70% from 25 to 44, 25.60% from 45 to 64, and 15.10% who were 65 years of age or older. The median age was 38 years. For every 100 females there were 94.70 males. For every 100 females age 18 and over, there were 90.30 males.

The median income for a household in the county was $29,417, and the median income for a family was $36,207. Males had a median income of $32,489 versus $18,435 for females. The per capita income for the county was $15,899. About 11.90% of families and 15.40% of the population were below the poverty line, including 18.80% of those under age 18 and 17.80% of those age 65 or over.

== Government ==
=== Government ===
The county government is a constitutional body granted specific powers by the Constitution of Arkansas and the Arkansas Code. The quorum court is the legislative branch of the county government and controls all spending and revenue collection. Representatives are called justices of the peace and are elected from county districts every even-numbered year. The number of districts in a county vary from nine to fifteen, and district boundaries are drawn by the county election commission. The Little River County Quorum Court has nine members. Presiding over quorum court meetings is the county judge, who serves as the chief operating officer of the county. The county judge is elected at-large and does not vote in quorum court business, although capable of vetoing quorum court decisions.

Little River County, Arkansas Elected countywide officials
Position	Officeholder	Party
County Judge	Larry Crowling	Republican
County Clerk	Deanna Sivley	Republican
Circuit Clerk	Lauren Abney	Republican
Sheriff/Collector	Bobby Walraven	Republican
Treasurer	Dayna Guthrie	Independent
Assessor	Allie Rosenbaum	Independent
Coroner	Chas Davis	Republican

The composition of the Quorum Court following the 2024 elections is 5 Republicans, 3 Independents, and 1 Democrat. Justices of the Peace (members) of the Quorum Court following the elections are:

- District 1: Andrea Billingsley (I) of Foreman
- District 2: Lisa Hearn (R) of Ashdown
- District 3: Keith Pullen (I) of Foreman
- District 4: Mark Ardwin (I) of Ashdown
- District 5: Tyler Davis (R) of Ashdown
- District 6: John Bowman (R) of Ashdown
- District 7: Charles Henderson (D) of Ashdown
- District 8: Suzanne Spain Ward (R) of Ashdown
- District 9: Larry Phillips (R) of Ashdown

Additionally, the townships of Little River County are entitled to elect their own respective constables, as set forth by the Constitution of Arkansas. Constables are largely of historical significance as they were used to keep the peace in rural areas when travel was more difficult. The township constables as of the 2024 elections are:

- Franklin: Charles Dorse (R)

=== Politics ===
United States presidential election results for Little River County, Arkansas
Year	Republican		Democratic		Third party(ies)	
Year	No.	%	No.	%	No.	%
1896	273	23.97%	852	74.80%	14	1.23%
1900	281	27.05%	751	72.28%	7	0.67%
1904	388	38.84%	557	55.76%	54	5.41%
1908	435	35.17%	660	53.35%	142	11.48%
1912	232	22.42%	615	59.42%	188	18.16%
1916	364	30.18%	842	69.82%	0	0.00%
1920	618	40.63%	853	56.08%	50	3.29%
1924	276	31.80%	546	62.90%	46	5.30%
1928	457	33.24%	916	66.62%	2	0.15%
1932	118	7.74%	1,399	91.80%	7	0.46%
1936	192	15.30%	1,056	84.14%	7	0.56%
1940	276	19.83%	1,104	79.31%	12	0.86%
1944	326	25.29%	961	74.55%	2	0.16%
1948	169	11.09%	900	59.06%	455	29.86%
1952	783	33.93%	1,522	65.94%	3	0.13%
1956	828	37.67%	1,308	59.51%	62	2.82%
1960	692	29.79%	1,514	65.17%	117	5.04%
1964	1,141	35.72%	2,040	63.87%	13	0.41%
1968	745	22.51%	1,092	32.99%	1,473	44.50%
1972	2,550	70.04%	1,091	29.96%	0	0.00%
1976	1,431	31.29%	3,142	68.71%	0	0.00%
1980	2,272	45.22%	2,631	52.37%	121	2.41%
1984	3,155	59.58%	2,090	39.47%	50	0.94%
1988	2,347	45.85%	2,740	53.53%	32	0.63%
1992	1,483	25.94%	3,327	58.18%	908	15.88%
1996	1,409	27.56%	3,183	62.27%	520	10.17%
2000	2,283	43.38%	2,883	54.78%	97	1.84%
2004	2,575	48.64%	2,677	50.57%	42	0.79%
2008	3,247	63.02%	1,753	34.03%	152	2.95%
2012	3,385	67.02%	1,552	30.73%	114	2.26%
2016	3,605	68.97%	1,397	26.73%	225	4.30%
2020	3,715	71.76%	1,226	23.68%	236	4.56%
2024	3,744	76.42%	1,084	22.13%	71	1.45%

== Communities ==
=== Cities ===
- Ashdown (county seat)
- Foreman
- Winthrop

=== Towns ===
- Ogden
- Wilton

=== Census-designated places ===
- Alleene
- Yarborough Landing

=== Other unincorporated places ===
- Comet
- Richmond
- Rocky Comfort
- Cerro Gordo

=== Townships ===
Townships in Arkansas are the divisions of a county. Each township includes unincorporated areas; some may have incorporated cities or towns within part of their boundaries. Arkansas townships have limited purposes in modern times. However, the United States census does list Arkansas population based on townships (sometimes referred to as "county subdivisions" or "minor civil divisions"). Townships are also of value for historical purposes in terms of genealogical research. Each town or city is within one or more townships in an Arkansas county based on census maps and publications. The townships of Little River County are listed below; listed in parentheses are the cities, towns, and/or census-designated places that are fully or partially inside the township.

- Arden
- Arkinda (Arkinda)
- Burke
- Caney
- Cleveland (Wilton)
- Franklin (Yarborough Landing)
- Jackson (Foreman)
- Jeff Davis
- Jefferson (Ashdown)
- Jewell
- Johnson (Ogden)
- Lick Creek
- Little River (Winthrop)
- Red River
- Richland
- Wallace

== Notable people ==
- Marion H. Crank, Speaker of the Arkansas House of Representatives, 1963–1964; Democratic gubernatorial nominee, 1968; resided in Foreman, interred there at Holy Cross Cemetery
- Jeff Davis, Democratic United States senator from Arkansas and the 20th governor of the U.S. state of Arkansas

== See also ==
- List of lakes in Little River County, Arkansas
- National Register of Historic Places listings in Little River County, Arkansas
- Ashdown School District
- Foreman School District
