= Corinth, Howard County, Arkansas =

- Unincorporated community
- Location within Arkansas Location within the United States
- Coordinates: 34°02′34″N 93°50′29″W
- Country: United States
- State: Arkansas
- County: Howard
- Elevation: 656 ft (200 m)
- Time zone: UTC-6 (Central (CST))
  - Summer (DST): UTC-5 (CDT)
- Area code: 870
- GNIS feature ID: 56969

Corinth is an unincorporated community in Howard County, Arkansas, United States. Corinth is located on Arkansas Highway 26, 6.7 miles (10.8 km) north of Nashville.
