= Harris, Oklahoma =

- Unincorporated community
- Location within Oklahoma Location within the United States
- Coordinates: 33°45′01″N 94°43′45″W
- Country: United States
- State: Oklahoma
- County: McCurtain
- Elevation: 341 ft (104 m)
- Time zone: UTC-6 (Central (CST))
  - Summer (DST): UTC-5 (CDT)
- Area code: Area code 580
- GNIS feature ID: 1101443

Harris is an unincorporated community in McCurtain County, Oklahoma, United States. The community is located on U.S. Route 259, 11 miles (18 km) southeast of Idabel. A post office opened in Harris on May 22, 1894. The community was named for Choctaw jurist Henry C. Harris.
