= Bois D'Arc Lake =

Lake in Texas

- Interactive map of Bois D'Arc Lake
- Coordinates: 33°40′38″N 95°59′28″W

Bois D'Arc Lake is a reservoir located in Fannin County, Texas.

== History ==
The reservoir, located to the north of U.S. Route 82 between Bonham and Honey Grove, was officially opened in 2023. Prior to the reservoirs construction, the area was mainly farmland.

The lake is primarily used to provide water to nearby towns, and is also a popular fishing site.
