= Buckner, Arkansas =

- City
- Location of Buckner in Lafayette County, Arkansas.
- Coordinates: 33°21′26″N 93°26′09″W
- Country: United States
- State: Arkansas
- County: Lafayette

Area
  - Total: 1.18 sq mi (3.06 km^{2})
  - Land: 1.18 sq mi (3.05 km^{2})
  - Water: 0.0039 sq mi (0.01 km^{2})
- Elevation: 279 ft (85 m)

Population (2020)
  - Total: 165
  - Estimate (2025): 150 ▼
  - Density: 140.3/sq mi (54.16/km^{2})
- Time zone: UTC-6 (Central (CST))
  - Summer (DST): UTC-5 (CDT)
- ZIP code: 71827
- Area code: 870
- FIPS code: 05-09550
- GNIS feature ID: 2403948

Buckner is a city in Lafayette County, Arkansas, United States. The population was 165 at the 2020 census.

== Geography ==
According to the United States Census Bureau, the city has a total area of 1.2 square miles (3.1 km^{2}), all land.

=== Climate ===
The climate in this area is characterized by hot, humid summers and generally mild to cool winters. According to the Köppen Climate Classification system, Buckner has a humid subtropical climate, abbreviated "Cfa" on climate maps.

== Demographics ==
Historical population
Census	Pop.	Note	%±
1890	312		—
1900	400		28.2%
1910	240		−40.0%
1920	360		50.0%
1930	264		−26.7%
1940	450		70.5%
1950	335		−25.6%
1960	289		−13.7%
1970	392		35.6%
1980	436		11.2%
1990	325		−25.5%
2000	396		21.8%
2010	275		−30.6%
2020	165		−40.0%
2025 (est.)	150	▼	−9.1%
U.S. Decennial Census; 2014 Estimate

As of the census of 2000, there were 396 people, 144 households, and 112 families residing in the city. The population density was 315.8 inhabitants per square mile (121.9/km^{2}). There were 165 housing units at an average density of 131.6 per square mile (50.8/km^{2}). The racial makeup of the city was 52.53% White, 45.20% Black or African American, 0.76% Native American, 0.51% Asian, and 1.01% from two or more races. 0.51% of the population were Hispanic or Latino of any race.

There were 144 households, out of which 31.9% had children under the age of 18 living with them, 56.9% were married couples living together, 16.7% had a female householder with no husband present, and 22.2% were non-families. 19.4% of all households were made up of individuals, and 6.9% had someone living alone who was 65 years of age or older. The average household size was 2.75 and the average family size was 3.13.

In the city the population was spread out, with 25.3% under the age of 18, 9.1% from 18 to 24, 28.5% from 25 to 44, 23.5% from 45 to 64, and 13.6% who were 65 years of age or older. The median age was 38 years. For every 100 females, there were 111.8 males. For every 100 females age 18 and over, there were 96.0 males.

The median income for a household in the city was $24,063, and the median income for a family was $25,179. The per capita income for the city was $10,192. About 19.1% of families and 25.8% of the population were below the poverty line, including 43.5% of those under age 18 and 21.7% of those age 65 or over.

== Infrastructure ==
- U.S. Highway 82
- Arkansas Highway 53
