= Alleene, Arkansas =

- Census-designated place
- Location in Arkansas Location in the United States
- Coordinates: 33°46′12″N 94°15′38″W
- Country: United States
- State: Arkansas
- County: Little River
- Elevation: 338 ft (103 m)

Population (2020)
  - Total: 97
- Time zone: UTC-6 (Central (CST))
  - Summer (DST): UTC-5 (CDT)
- GNIS feature ID: 2805615

Alleene (also Aleene, Allene, Lawrenceville, Mineola, and Minneola) is an unincorporated community and census-designated place (CDP) in Little River County, Arkansas, United States. It was first listed as a CDP in the 2020 census with a population of 97.

The Will Reed Farm House, listed on the National Register of Historic Places, is located in Alleene.

== Demographics ==
Historical population
Census	Pop.	Note	%±
2020	97		—
U.S. Decennial Census; 2020

=== 2020 census ===
Alleene CDP, Arkansas – Racial and ethnic composition Note: the U.S. census treats Hispanic/Latino as an ethnic category. This table excludes Latinos from the racial categories and assigns them to a separate category. Hispanics/Latinos may be of any race.
Race / Ethnicity (NH = Non-Hispanic)	Pop 2020	% 2020
White alone (NH)	88	90.72%
Black or African American alone (NH)	0	0.00%
Native American or Alaska Native alone (NH)	0	0.00%
Asian alone (NH)	1	1.03%
Pacific Islander alone (NH)	0	0.00%
Some Other Race alone (NH)	0	0.00%
Mixed Race or Multi-Racial (NH)	4	4.12%
Hispanic or Latino (any race)	4	4.12%
Total	97	100.00%
