= Tollette, Arkansas =

- Town
- Location of Tollette in Howard County, Arkansas.
- Coordinates: 33°49′9″N 93°53′45″W
- Country: United States
- State: Arkansas
- County: Howard

Area
  - Total: 0.96 sq mi (2.49 km^{2})
  - Land: 0.96 sq mi (2.49 km^{2})
  - Water: 0 sq mi (0.00 km^{2})
- Elevation: 360 ft (110 m)

Population (2020)
  - Total: 185
  - Estimate (2025): 185
  - Density: 192.2/sq mi (74.21/km^{2})
- Time zone: UTC-6 (Central (CST))
  - Summer (DST): UTC-5 (CDT)
- FIPS code: 05-69500
- GNIS feature ID: 0058751

Tollette is a town in southern Howard County, Arkansas, United States. As of the 2020 census, Tollette had a population of 185.

Tollette was established as an all-African American town by Sanford Tollette and his wife Caldonia Crofton Tollette in the 1800s. They built a church, a store, and a public school. Caldonia Tollette was postmistress of the United States Post Office in 1893. Their daughter, Mattye Tollette Bond began a teaching career at the age of fifteen. She married Ollie Seahorn Bond and resided in his hometown of Brownsville, Tennessee where they organized the first NAACP chapter in Haywood County in 1939. Sanford and Caldonia's granddaughter Mildred Bond Roxborough began working for the NAACP in Tennessee at the age of nine in 1935 and continued her distinguished service to the organization in New York from 1954 through 1997 rising to executive positions including Director of Operations.

== Geography ==
Tollette is located in southern Howard County. Arkansas Highway 355 passes through the town, leading north 4 miles (6 km) to Mineral Springs and south 17 miles (27 km) to Fulton and Interstate 30.

According to the United States Census Bureau, the town has a total area of 0.97 square miles (2.5 km^{2}), all land.

== Demographics ==
Historical population
Census	Pop.	Note	%±
1980	407		—
1990	316		−22.4%
2000	324		2.5%
2010	240		−25.9%
2020	185		−22.9%
2025 (est.)	185	Steady	0.0%
U.S. Decennial Census

=== Racial and ethnic composition ===
Tollette town, Arkansas – Racial and ethnic composition Note: the US Census treats Hispanic/Latino as an ethnic category. This table excludes Latinos from the racial categories and assigns them to a separate category. Hispanics/Latinos may be of any race.
Race / Ethnicity (NH = Non-Hispanic)	Pop 2000	Pop 2010	Pop 2020	% 2000	% 2010	% 2020
White alone (NH)	2	7	5	0.62%	2.92%	2.70%
Black or African American alone (NH)	319	232	173	98.46%	96.67%	93.51%
Native American or Alaska Native alone (NH)	0	1	0	0.00%	0.42%	0.00%
Asian alone (NH)	0	0	0	0.00%	0.00%	0.00%
Native Hawaiian or Pacific Islander alone (NH)	0	0	0	0.00%	0.00%	0.00%
Other race alone (NH)	0	0	0	0.00%	0.00%	0.00%
Mixed race or Multiracial (NH)	3	0	4	0.93%	0.00%	2.16%
Hispanic or Latino (any race)	0	0	3	0.00%	0.00%	1.62%
Total	324	240	185	100.00%	100.00%	100.00%

=== 2020 census ===
As of the 2020 United States census, there were 185 people, 108 households, and 72 families residing in the town.

=== 2000 census ===
As of the census of 2000, there were 324 people, 136 households, and 90 families residing in the town. The population density was 133.1/km^{2} (343.0/mi^{2}). There were 149 housing units at an average density of 61.2/km^{2} (157.7/mi^{2}). The racial makeup of the town was 0.62% White, 98.46% Black or African American, and 0.93% from two or more races.

There were 136 households, out of which 24.3% had children under the age of 18 living with them, 33.8% were married couples living together, 29.4% had a female householder with no husband present, and 33.1% were non-families. 31.6% of all households were made up of individuals, and 16.9% had someone living alone who was 65 years of age or older. The average household size was 2.38 and the average family size was 3.01.

In the town, the population was spread out, with 24.1% under the age of 18, 10.5% from 18 to 24, 24.7% from 25 to 44, 22.5% from 45 to 64, and 18.2% who were 65 years of age or older. The median age was 37 years. For every 100 females, there were 90.6 males. For every 100 females age 18 and over, there were 86.4 males.

The median income for a household in the town was $24,688, and the median income for a family was $31,250. Males had a median income of $19,063 versus $18,295 for females. The per capita income for the town was $10,589. About 11.7% of families and 18.5% of the population were below the poverty line, including 17.5% of those under age 18 and 40.0% of those age 65 or over.

== Notable person ==
- Luenell, actress and comedian
