= Howard County, Arkansas =

County in Arkansas, United States

- County
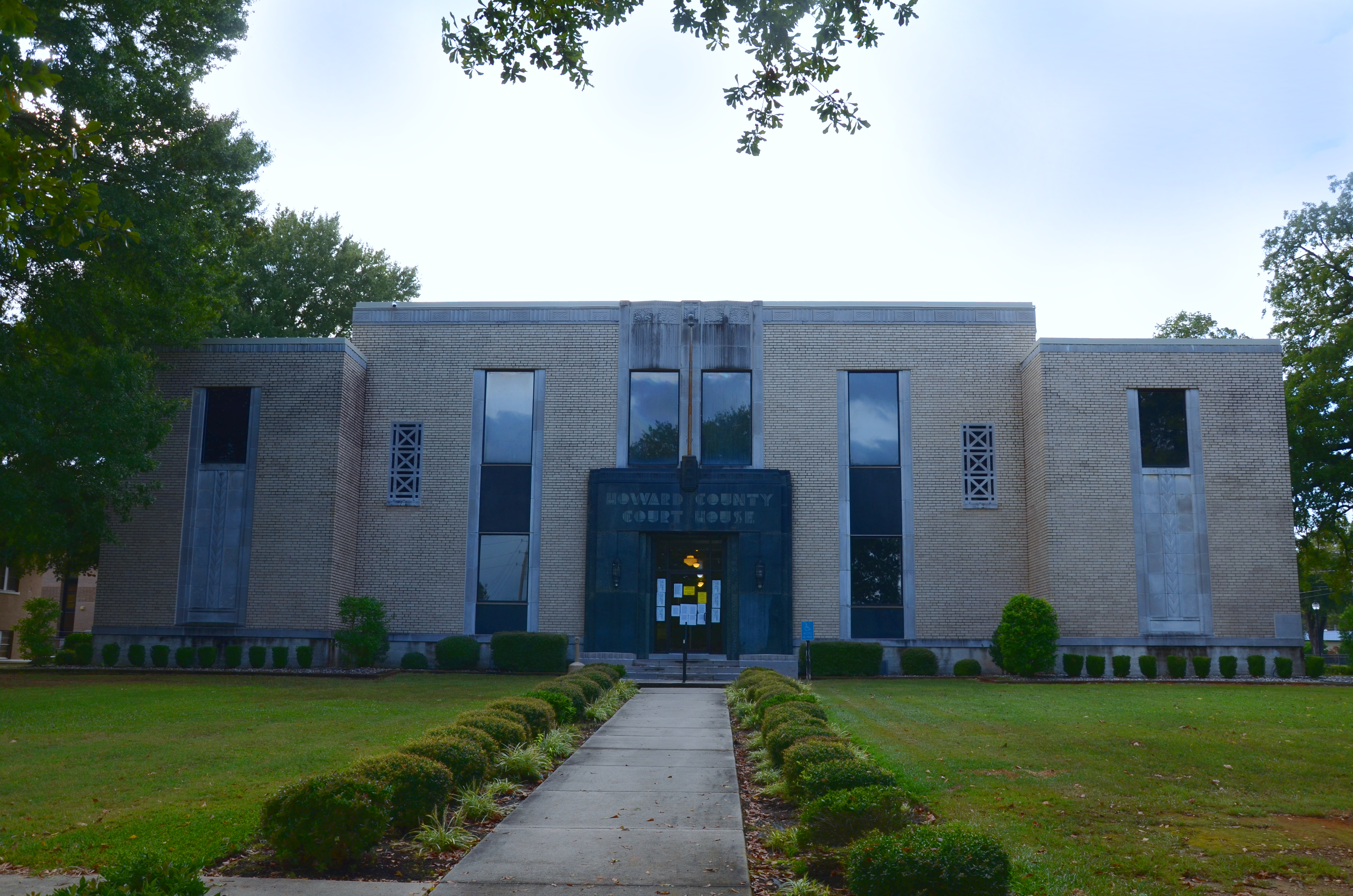
- Howard County Courthouse in Nashville, Arkansas

- Location within the U.S. state of Arkansas
- Coordinates: 34°08′10″N 93°59′14″W
- Country: United States
- State: Arkansas
- Founded: April 17, 1873
- Seat: Nashville
- Largest city: Nashville

Area
  - Total: 595 sq mi (1,540 km^{2})
  - Land: 589 sq mi (1,530 km^{2})
  - Water: 6.8 sq mi (18 km^{2}) 1.1%

Population (2020)
  - Total: 12,785
  - Estimate (2025): 12,306 ▼
  - Density: 21.7/sq mi (8.38/km^{2})
- Time zone: UTC−6 (Central)
  - Summer (DST): UTC−5 (CDT)
- Congressional district: 4th
- Website: https://www.arcounties.org/counties/howard/

Howard County is a county located in the U.S. state of Arkansas. As of the 2020 census, the population was 12,785. The county seat is Nashville. Howard County is Arkansas's 74th county, formed on April 17, 1873, and named for James Howard, a state senator. It is a dry county.

== Geography ==
According to the U.S. Census Bureau, the county has a total area of 595 square miles (1,540 km^{2}), of which 589 square miles (1,530 km^{2}) is land and 6.8 square miles (18 km^{2}) (1.1%) is water.

=== Major highways ===
- U.S. Highway 70
- U.S. Highway 278
- U.S. Highway 371
- Highway 26
- Highway 27
- Highway 32
- Highway 73
- Highway 84
- Highway 246
- Highway 332
- Highway 355
- Highway 369
- Highway 980

=== Adjacent counties ===
- Polk County (north)
- Montgomery County (northeast)
- Pike County (east)
- Hempstead County (southeast)
- Little River County (southwest)
- Sevier County (west)

=== National protected area ===
- Ouachita National Forest (part)

== Demographics ==
Historical population
Census	Pop.	Note	%±
1880	9,917		—
1890	13,789		39.0%
1900	14,076		2.1%
1910	16,898		20.0%
1920	18,565		9.9%
1930	17,489		−5.8%
1940	16,621		−5.0%
1950	13,342		−19.7%
1960	10,878		−18.5%
1970	11,412		4.9%
1980	13,459		17.9%
1990	13,569		0.8%
2000	14,300		5.4%
2010	13,789		−3.6%
2020	12,785		−7.3%
2025 (est.)	12,306	▼	−3.7%
U.S. Decennial Census; 1790–1960 1900–1990; 1990–2000 2010

=== 2020 census ===
As of the 2020 census, the county had a population of 12,785.

The median age was 40.6 years. 25.3% of residents were under the age of 18 and 18.9% of residents were 65 years of age or older. For every 100 females there were 94.7 males, and for every 100 females age 18 and over there were 89.6 males age 18 and over.

The racial makeup of the county was 63.9% White, 20.7% Black or African American, 0.9% American Indian and Alaska Native, 0.5% Asian, <0.1% Native Hawaiian and Pacific Islander, 8.1% from some other race, and 5.9% from two or more races. Hispanic or Latino residents of any race comprised 11.9% of the population.

<0.1% of residents lived in urban areas, while 100.0% lived in rural areas.

There were 5,096 households in the county, of which 32.6% had children under the age of 18 living in them. Of all households, 46.4% were married-couple households, 19.0% were households with a male householder and no spouse or partner present, and 29.7% were households with a female householder and no spouse or partner present. About 28.9% of all households were made up of individuals and 13.6% had someone living alone who was 65 years of age or older.

There were 6,152 housing units, of which 17.2% were vacant. Among occupied housing units, 68.8% were owner-occupied and 31.2% were renter-occupied. The homeowner vacancy rate was 1.7% and the rental vacancy rate was 15.3%.

=== 2000 census ===
As of the 2000 census, there were 14,300 people, 5,471 households, and 3,922 families residing in the county. The population density was 24 people per square mile (9.3 people/km^{2}). There were 6,297 housing units at an average density of 11 units per square mile (4.2 units/km^{2}). The racial makeup of the county was 73.60% White, 21.86% Black or African American, 0.41% Native American, 0.50% Asian, 0.01% Pacific Islander, 2.76% from other races, and 0.86% from two or more races. 5.08% of the population were Hispanic or Latino of any race. 4.75% reported speaking Spanish at home, while 1.73% speak German.

There were 5,471 households, out of which 34.10% had children under the age of 18 living with them, 55.20% were married couples living together, 12.70% had a female householder with no husband present, and 28.30% were non-families. 25.70% of all households were made up of individuals, and 12.60% had someone living alone who was 65 years of age or older. The average household size was 2.55 and the average family size was 3.04.

In the county, the population was spread out, with 26.90% under the age of 18, 8.60% from 18 to 24, 27.80% from 25 to 44, 21.60% from 45 to 64, and 15.10% who were 65 years of age or older. The median age was 36 years. For every 100 females there were 95.10 males. For every 100 females age 18 and over, there were 91.20 males.

The median income for a household in the county was $28,699, and the median income for a family was $34,510. Males had a median income of $28,086 versus $17,266 for females. The per capita income for the county was $15,586. About 11.90% of families and 15.50% of the population were below the poverty line, including 20.10% of those under age 18 and 17.00% of those age 65 or over.

== Government ==
=== Government ===
The county government is a constitutional body granted specific powers by the Constitution of Arkansas and the Arkansas Code. The quorum court is the legislative branch of the county government and controls all spending and revenue collection. Representatives are called justices of the peace and are elected from county districts every even-numbered year. The number of districts in a county vary from nine to fifteen, and district boundaries are drawn by the county election commission. The Howard County Quorum Court has nine members. Presiding over quorum court meetings is the county judge, who serves as the chief operating officer of the county. The county judge is elected at-large and does not vote in quorum court business, although capable of vetoing quorum court decisions.

Howard County, Arkansas Elected countywide officials
Position	Officeholder	Party
County Judge	Brent Pinkerton	Republican
County Clerk	Keri Teague	Republican
Circuit Clerk	Angie Lewis	Democratic
Sheriff/Collector	Bryan McJunkins	Republican
Treasurer	Sheri Mixon	Republican
Assessor	Cindy Butler	Republican
Coroner	Matthew Smith	Republican

The composition of the Quorum Court following the 2024 elections is 5 Republicans, 2 Democrats, and 1 Independent, with one seat currently vacant. Justices of the Peace (members) of the Quorum Court following the elections are:

- District 1: Kerry Strasner (I)
- District 2: Andy Hogg (R)
- District 3: D'Ann Rogers (R)
- District 4: Janet O'Neal (R)
- District 5: Jerry Harwell (R)
- District 6: Elizabeth McDaniel (R)
- District 7: (seat currently Vacant)
- District 8: Don W. Marks (D)
- District 9: Juanita Jackson (D)

=== Politics ===
Over the past few election cycles, Howard County has trended heavily towards the GOP. The last Democratic presidential candidate (as of 2024) to carry this county was Bill Clinton in 1996.

United States presidential election results for Howard County, Arkansas
Year	Republican		Democratic		Third party(ies)	
Year	No.	%	No.	%	No.	%
1896	294	17.41%	1,392	82.42%	3	0.18%
1900	585	36.22%	986	61.05%	44	2.72%
1904	500	39.03%	644	50.27%	137	10.69%
1908	610	35.24%	967	55.86%	154	8.90%
1912	321	24.06%	760	56.97%	253	18.97%
1916	545	29.27%	1,317	70.73%	0	0.00%
1920	1,208	44.94%	1,452	54.02%	28	1.04%
1924	338	23.12%	954	65.25%	170	11.63%
1928	763	41.76%	1,055	57.74%	9	0.49%
1932	165	8.82%	1,703	91.02%	3	0.16%
1936	275	16.02%	1,437	83.69%	5	0.29%
1940	419	21.24%	1,540	78.05%	14	0.71%
1944	576	27.20%	1,538	72.62%	4	0.19%
1948	199	12.05%	1,250	75.67%	203	12.29%
1952	944	38.64%	1,492	61.07%	7	0.29%
1956	1,329	47.72%	1,428	51.27%	28	1.01%
1960	1,225	44.79%	1,366	49.95%	144	5.27%
1964	1,649	53.84%	1,320	43.10%	94	3.07%
1968	1,286	32.09%	1,061	26.48%	1,660	41.43%
1972	2,682	71.50%	1,069	28.50%	0	0.00%
1976	1,575	32.94%	3,207	67.06%	0	0.00%
1980	2,386	47.12%	2,564	50.63%	114	2.25%
1984	3,079	63.72%	1,746	36.13%	7	0.14%
1988	2,510	57.87%	1,818	41.92%	9	0.21%
1992	1,728	34.73%	2,764	55.56%	483	9.71%
1996	1,478	31.91%	2,741	59.18%	413	8.92%
2000	2,326	52.16%	2,063	46.27%	70	1.57%
2004	2,736	55.35%	2,166	43.82%	41	0.83%
2008	2,957	61.02%	1,746	36.03%	143	2.95%
2012	2,892	64.81%	1,471	32.97%	99	2.22%
2016	3,157	67.54%	1,351	28.90%	166	3.55%
2020	3,367	69.65%	1,340	27.72%	127	2.63%
2024	3,246	72.57%	1,158	25.89%	69	1.54%

== Communities ==
=== Cities ===
- Dierks
- Mineral Springs
- Nashville (county seat)

=== Towns ===
- Tollette

=== Census-designated places ===
- Center Point
- Saratoga

=== Other unincorporated communities ===
- Athens
- Corinth
- Midway
- Mineola
- Okay
- Schaal
- Umpire

=== Historic communities ===
- Allbrook
- Antimony
- Baker Springs
- Carl
- Cowling
- Dial
- Eldridge
- Euclid
- Galena
- Henry
- Howe
- Markham
- Martha
- Minnie
- New Moon
- Pates
- Picayune
- Rosadale

=== Townships ===
Townships in Arkansas are the divisions of a county. Each township includes unincorporated areas; some may have incorporated cities or towns within part of their boundaries. Arkansas townships have limited purposes in modern times. However, the United States census does list Arkansas population based on townships (sometimes referred to as "county subdivisions" or "minor civil divisions"). Townships are also of value for historical purposes in terms of genealogical research. Each town or city is within one or more townships in an Arkansas county based on census maps and publications. The townships of Howard County are listed below; listed in parentheses are the cities, towns, and/or census-designated places that are fully or partially inside the township.

- Blackland
- Blue Bayou
- Blue Ridge
- Brewer
- Buck Range
- Burg
- Center Point
- Clay
- County Line
- Dillard
- Duckett
- Franklin
- Holly Creek
- Madison (Dierks)
- Mineral Springs (Mineral Springs)
- Mountain
- Muddy Fork
- Nashville (Nashville)
- Saline
- Saratoga
- Tollette (Tollette) --- township completely inside Blackland Township
- Umpire

== See also ==
- List of lakes in Howard County, Arkansas
- National Register of Historic Places listings in Howard County, Arkansas
