= Mineral Springs, Arkansas =

- City
- Location of Mineral Springs in Howard County, Arkansas.
- Coordinates: 33°52′35″N 93°55′7″W
- Country: United States
- State: Arkansas
- County: Howard

Government
  - Mayor: Vera Marks

Area
  - Total: 2.14 sq mi (5.53 km^{2})
  - Land: 2.13 sq mi (5.52 km^{2})
  - Water: 0.0039 sq mi (0.01 km^{2})
- Elevation: 341 ft (104 m)

Population (2020)
  - Total: 1,085
  - Estimate (2025): 1,036 ▼
  - Density: 508.6/sq mi (196.39/km^{2})
- Time zone: Central
  - Summer (DST): Central
- ZIP code: 71851
- Area code: 870
- FIPS code: 05-46040
- GNIS feature ID: 2404272

Mineral Springs is a city in Howard County, Arkansas, United States. As of the 2020 census, Mineral Springs had a population of 1,085.

== Geography ==
Mineral Springs is located in southern Howard County at 33°52′35″N 93°55′7″W (33.876358, -93.918599). Arkansas Highway 27 runs through the center of town, leading northeast 7 miles (11 km) to Nashville, the county seat, and west 13 miles (21 km) to Ben Lomond. Arkansas Highway 355 joins Highway 27 on Runnels Street through the center of Mineral Springs, but it leads north 12 miles (19 km) to Center Point and south 4.5 miles (7.2 km) to Tollette.

According to the United States Census Bureau, Mineral Springs has a total area of 2.30 square miles (5.95 km^{2}), of which 2.28 square miles (5.90 km^{2}) are land and 0.02 square miles (0.05 km^{2}), or 0.84%, are water.

== Demographics ==
Historical population
Census	Pop.	Note	%±
1880	546		—
1900	278		—
1910	432		55.4%
1920	777		79.9%
1930	712		−8.4%
1940	731		2.7%
1950	751		2.7%
1960	616		−18.0%
1970	761		23.5%
1980	936		23.0%
1990	1,004		7.3%
2000	1,264		25.9%
2010	1,208		−4.4%
2020	1,085		−10.2%
2025 (est.)	1,036	▼	−4.5%
U.S. Decennial Census

=== 2020 census ===
As of the 2020 census, Mineral Springs had a population of 1,085. The median age was 35.9 years. 27.6% of residents were under the age of 18 and 17.1% were 65 years of age or older. For every 100 females, there were 90.7 males, and for every 100 females age 18 and over, there were 80.5 males age 18 and over.

0.0% of residents lived in urban areas, while 100.0% lived in rural areas.

There were 427 households in Mineral Springs, of which 36.8% had children under the age of 18 living in them. Of all households, 39.1% were married-couple households, 19.7% were households with a male householder and no spouse or partner present, and 35.1% were households with a female householder and no spouse or partner present. About 30.7% of all households were made up of individuals, and 13.8% had someone living alone who was 65 years of age or older.

There were 513 housing units, of which 16.8% were vacant. The homeowner vacancy rate was 3.1% and the rental vacancy rate was 11.5%.

Mineral Springs racial composition
Race	Number	Percentage
White (non-Hispanic)	310	28.57%
Black or African American (non-Hispanic)	538	49.59%
Native American	3	0.28%
Other/Mixed	50	4.61%
Hispanic or Latino	184	16.96%

=== 2000 census ===
As of the census of 2000, there were 1,264 people, 466 households, and 354 families residing in the city. The population density was 546.3 inhabitants per square mile (210.9/km^{2}). There were 519 housing units at an average density of 224.3 per square mile (86.6/km^{2}). The racial makeup of the city was 51.19% White, 41.46% Black or African American, 0.16% Native American, 0.08% Asian, 5.78% from other races, and 1.34% from two or more races. 10.92% of the population were Hispanic or Latino of any race.

There were 466 households, out of which 40.3% had children under the age of 18 living with them, 51.7% were married couples living together, 19.7% had a female householder with no husband present, and 24.0% were non-families. 20.8% of all households were made up of individuals, and 10.7% had someone living alone who was 65 years of age or older. The average household size was 2.71 and the average family size was 3.07.

In the city, the population was spread out, with 30.5% under the age of 18, 7.8% from 18 to 24, 29.5% from 25 to 44, 20.8% from 45 to 64, and 11.4% who were 65 years of age or older. The median age was 33 years. For every 100 females, there were 92.1 males. For every 100 females age 18 and over, there were 83.9 males.

The median income for a household in the city was $29,853, and the median income for a family was $31,150. Males had a median income of $24,286 versus $16,775 for females. The per capita income for the city was $12,477. About 16.2% of families and 21.1% of the population were below the poverty line, including 26.5% of those under age 18 and 14.8% of those age 65 or over.

== Education ==
Public education of early childhood, elementary and secondary school students is provided by the Mineral Springs Saratoga School District, which leads to graduation from Mineral Springs High School.

== Notable people ==
- Willie Davis, born in Mineral Springs, Major League Baseball player
- William T. Dillard, founder of Dillard's; born in Mineral Springs
