= Columbus, Arkansas =

Unincorporated community in Arkansas, US

- Unincorporated community
- Location within Arkansas Location within the United States
- Coordinates: 33°46′33″N 93°49′02″W
- Country: United States
- State: Arkansas
- County: Hempstead
- Elevation: 433 ft (132 m)
- Time zone: UTC-6 (Central (CST))
  - Summer (DST): UTC-5 (CDT)
- ZIP code: 71831
- Area code: 870
- GNIS feature ID: 47941

Columbus is an unincorporated community in Hempstead County, Arkansas, United States. Columbus is located on Arkansas Highway 73, 15 miles (24 km) west-northwest of Hope. Columbus has a post office with ZIP code 71831.

== Notable person ==
- Rogerline Johnson, photographer known for his photographs of African American life in the Arkansas Delta in the 1950s and 1960s
