= Foreman, Arkansas =

- City
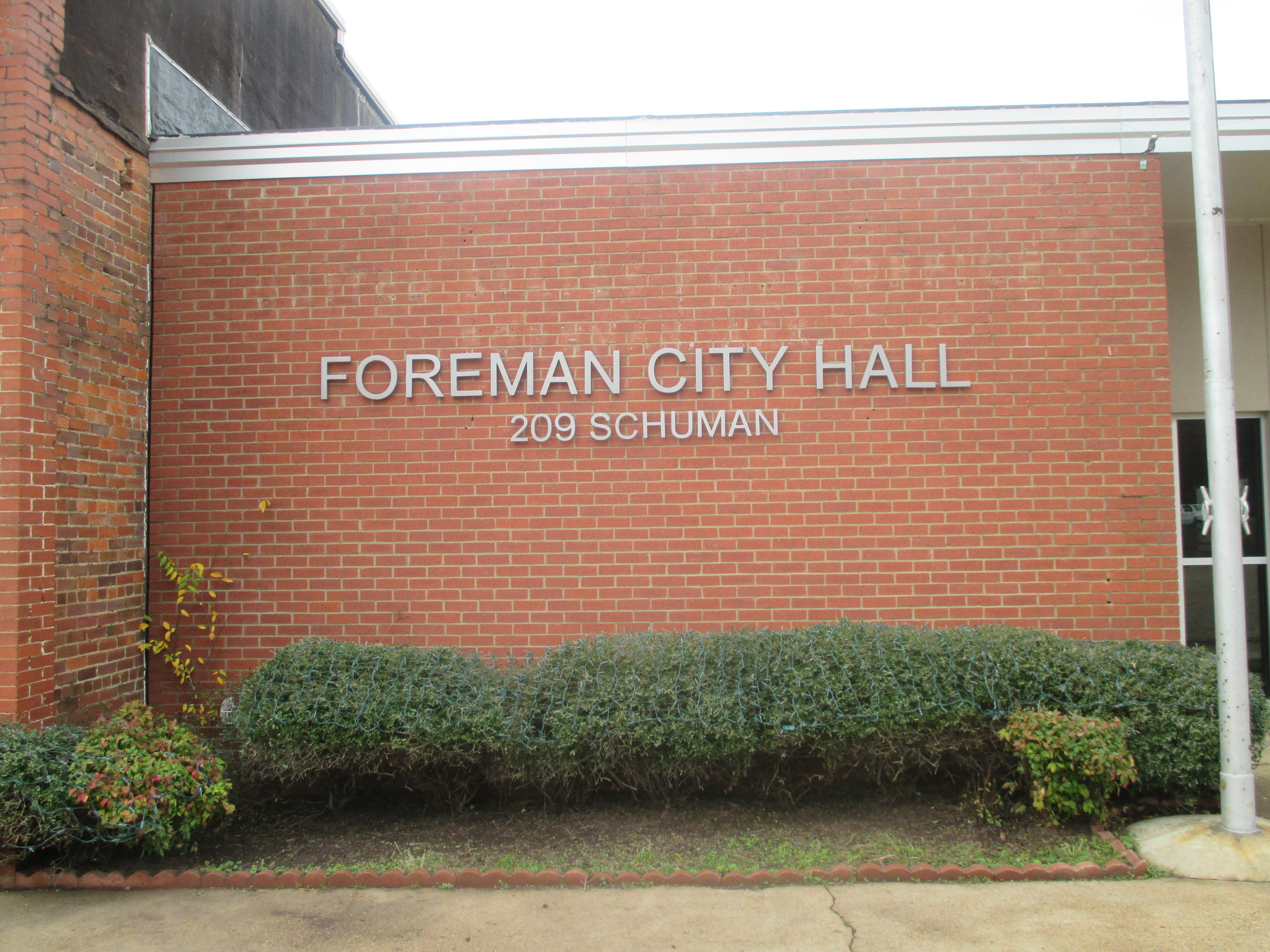
- Foreman City Hall

- Location of Foreman in Little River County, Arkansas.
- Coordinates: 33°43′11″N 94°23′52″W
- Country: United States
- State: Arkansas
- County: Little River

Area
  - Total: 1.99 sq mi (5.15 km^{2})
  - Land: 1.98 sq mi (5.12 km^{2})
  - Water: 0.012 sq mi (0.03 km^{2})
- Elevation: 404 ft (123 m)

Population (2020)
  - Total: 977
  - Estimate (2025): 951 ▼
  - Density: 494.3/sq mi (190.85/km^{2})
- Time zone: UTC-6 (Central (CST))
  - Summer (DST): UTC-5 (CDT)
- ZIP code: 71836
- Area code: 870
- FIPS code: 05-24250
- GNIS feature ID: 2403631
- Website: www.foremanar.com

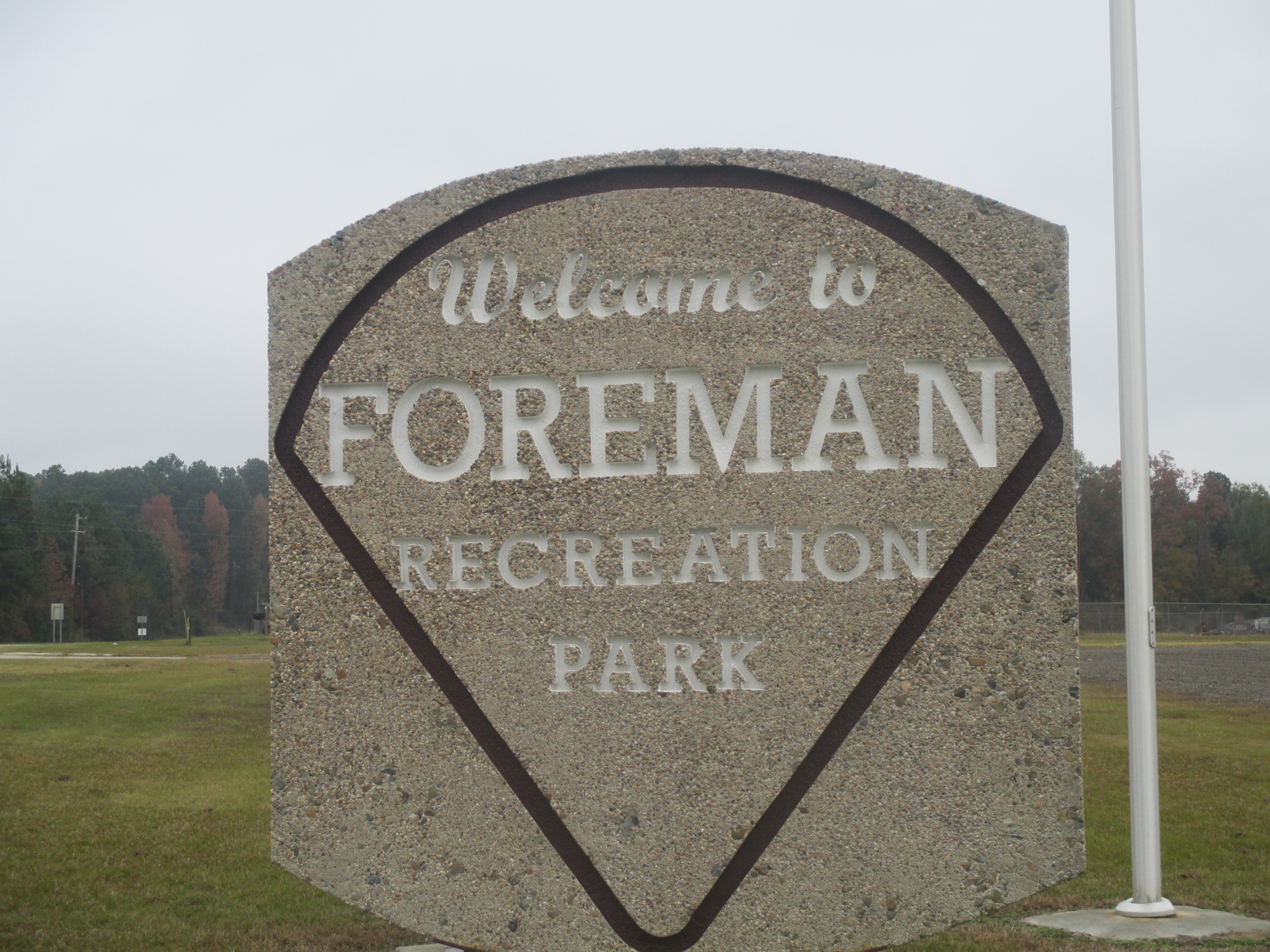
Sign at Foreman Recreation Park

Foreman is a small city in Little River County, Arkansas, United States. The population was 977 at the 2020 census.

== Geography ==
According to the United States Census Bureau, the city has a total area of 2.0 square miles (5.2 km^{2}), of which 2.0 square miles (5.1 km^{2}) is land and 0.51% is water.

== Demographics ==
Historical population
Census	Pop.	Note	%±
1970	1,173		—
1980	1,377		17.4%
1990	1,267		−8.0%
2000	1,125		−11.2%
2010	1,011		−10.1%
2020	977		−3.4%
2025 (est.)	951	▼	−2.7%
U.S. Decennial Census

=== 2020 census ===
Foreman racial composition
Race	Number	Percentage
White (non-Hispanic)	577	59.06%
Black or African American (non-Hispanic)	263	26.92%
Native American	32	3.28%
Asian	2	0.2%
Other/Mixed	59	6.04%
Hispanic or Latino	44	4.5%

As of the 2020 United States census, there were 977 people, 552 households, and 305 families residing in the city.

=== 2000 census ===
As of the census of 2000, there were 1,125 people, 490 households, and 297 families residing in the city. The population density was 573.7 inhabitants per square mile (221.5/km^{2}). There were 566 housing units at an average density of 288.6 per square mile (111.4/km^{2}). The racial makeup of the city was 67.29% White, 27.29% Black or African American, 1.96% Native American, 1.07% from other races, and 2.40% from two or more races. 2.04% of the population were Hispanic or Latino of any race. There were 490 households, out of which 29.0% had children under the age of 18 living with them, 43.7% were married couples living together, 13.9% had a female householder with no husband present, and 39.2% were non-families. 36.1% of all households were made up of individuals, and 19.0% had someone living alone who was 65 years of age or older. The average household size was 2.30 and the average family size was 3.03.

In the city, the population was spread out, with 25.5% under the age of 18, 8.4% from 18 to 24, 23.9% from 25 to 44, 23.3% from 45 to 64, and 18.8% who were 65 years of age or older. The median age was 39 years. For every 100 females, there were 84.4 males. For every 100 females age 18 and over, there were 79.4 males.

The median income for a household in the city was $22,176, and the median income for a family was $29,231. Males had a median income of $26,944 versus $18,229 for females. The per capita income for the city was $13,202. About 18.2% of families and 26.7% of the population were below the poverty line, including 32.9% of those under age 18 and 34.3% of those age 65.

== History ==
Carved out of parts of Sevier County and Hempstead County, Little River County was established in 1867 by an act of the Arkansas legislature. The new county gave citizens a shorter and easier journey to their county seat of government. Because of the area's close proximity to the Little River, which flows into the Red River near Texarkana (Miller County), it took the name of Little River County. This county is located in the southwest corner of the state and is surrounded by Sevier, Hempstead, Howard, and Miller counties in Arkansas and by counties in Texas and Oklahoma. The two rivers form major parts of the boundary of Little River County.

The land in and around Little River County is rich and fertile. It contains an abundance of lime formations in some areas near White Cliffs, Okay, and Foreman. In 1893, because of the available limestone, the Western Portland Cement Company once thrived at White Cliffs, though now only its ruins exist. Much later, because of the track of limestone running through Little River County, Sevier County, and Hempstead County, Ideal Cement Company was built in Okay. It made a quality cement for years but was later sold to a German company which did not want to make the costly repairs that were needed. At the same time that Ideal Cement Company was operating full scale, Foreman Cement Company, owned by Arkansas Louisiana Gas Company, was producing an abundance of quality cement. Eventually, Foreman Cement Company became the leading producer of cement in the southwest region of Arkansas. Today, it is still a thriving plant owned by Ash Grove Cement Company of Overland Park, Kansas. Ash Grove Cement has recently been acquired by CRH a publicly traded entity headquartered in Dublin, Ireland.

=== Louisiana Purchase through the Gilded Age ===
Some Caddo settlements existed in the area that would become Little River County, but the Caddo moved south out of the Great Bend area by 1778. The land continued to be regarded as Caddo territory, though, until a treaty in 1835. A Quapaw reservation also included parts of southwest Arkansas between 1820 and 1825, but that land eventually was exchanged for lands west of the territorial border. Even before treaties with the local Indian tribes were signed, settlers were developing the land. After the completion of these treaties, more civilized settlements and communities developed.

Pioneers had already begun settling in the area in the early 1800s. The first town to be plotted was Laynesport in 1836, on land donated for development by Benjamin Layne. By 1845, Willow Springs, later renamed Rocky Comfort, in the western part of the county, began to flourish, and by 1854, the community of Richmond had begun to thrive.

As they did throughout America, people suffered during the Civil War. They often experienced mental anguish and hardships because of the loss of lives and financial security. People in the South suspended raising cotton while other products were produced for the war efforts. Many lost property and experienced displacement.

After the legal establishment of Little River County in 1867, the first courthouse and jail in the county were located near the area that is now known as Alleene on land owned by the first sheriff, William M. Freeman. In 1868, Powell Clayton, governor of Arkansas, had all county records moved to established headquarters in Rocky Comfort.

In 1880, citizens of Richmond built a new courthouse. The property on which the courthouse was to be built was deeded to the county on the condition that Richmond would remain the county seat. After this courthouse burned, citizens of Richmond built another courthouse at no cost to the county because they wanted to keep the county seat in Richmond.

=== Early Twentieth Century ===
In 1902, the county seat was moved from Richmond to Foreman, formerly called Rocky Comfort. Foreman and Ashdown later competed for the county seat. When an election was held in 1906, Ashdown won the most votes to become the new county seat. After this election, records were moved from Foreman to a vacant building, known as the Mizell Building. A new courthouse was constructed in Ashdown in 1907.

On October 24, 1929, the New York stock market crash brought about the Great Depression. Little River County citizens suffered in much the same way as people in the rest of the country. Farms were lost, wages decreased, and unemployment increased. By 1932, income had dropped to one third of what it had been before October 1929. Many farmers were forced to sell their property during the 1930s. For years, the county's principal source of income was agriculture. Cotton was the leading crop, and most of the early communities had cotton gins. Corn was the second-largest crop, but soon the timber industry would become the leading industry in the county. Many of the small settlements in Little River County were located near sawmills, cotton gins, or rivers.

The construction of railroads had a definite impact on the development of some towns and the decline of others. Little River County had its first railroad in 1889. In 1895, the Arkansas and Choctaw Railroad from Ashdown to Arkinda was built. The Kansas City Southern Railroad began running three new fast-freight locomotives with larger engines capable of pulling 100 loaded freight cars. With these modern engines, goods could more easily be transported, making the tough economic times in the 1930s more bearable. The presence of the Kansas City Southern Railroad, the St. Louis/San Francisco Railroad and the Memphis/Dallas and Gulf Railroad caused the county to grow rapidly. Before the construction of railroads, the rivers were used to transport goods by way of ferries, steamboats, and flatboats. Passenger trains began operating in the county in the late 1890s. After the emergence of railroads, electrical and telephone services became available to parts of the county by 1912, and natural gas came into Ashdown in 1930.

=== World War II through Modern Era ===
By 1950, manufacturing plants began to change the economy. The development of Millwood Lake in 1965 was of major importance to the county's industrial growth. Access to water was a necessity for industry, and Ashdown's rivers and lake provided plenty. Nekoosa Paper Mill was built in Ashdown in 1968 because of its access to the Red River. The plant was sold to Georgia-Pacific in 1991 and to Domtar Industries in 2001. Presently, the timber industry is paramount in Ashdown; Domtar Industries is a major employer there. Another key company, generating millions of dollars for the county, is Ash Grove Cement Company in Foreman. It was built in 1956 and rebuilt in 2010.

After the paper mill and the cement company came to Little River County, many citizens prospered. They began many building projects, including medical facilities. In 1958, the present Little River Memorial Hospital was constructed in Ashdown, and as of 2006, there are two nursing facilities and a retirement center. A new high school building, replacing the 1954 building, is under construction and is expected to be completed by 2007.

A modern bridge was constructed in 1980 over the Red River to replace the Index Bridge, built in 1919. Four-lane highways have encouraged easy access to Texarkana, now only a twenty-minute drive from Ashdown, which now has a bypass bridge to shorten the distance from Foreman to Texarkana.

Ashdown is home to the Cossatot Community College of the University of Arkansas. Millwood Lake and Millwood State Park are well known for trophy fishing contests and camping sites and sports facilities. The county courthouse is listed on the National Register of Historic Places, and it draws many tourists each Christmas season when the entire courthouse and its dome are covered in lights. Nine other properties are on the National Register, including the Hunter/Coulter House in Ashdown, the Will Reed House in Alleene, and the New Rocky Comfort House in Foreman. Ashdown recently established the Two Rivers Museum, which is a favorite tourist site, sponsored by the Little River County Historical Society.

== Politics ==
The city of Foreman has trended strongly Republican over the past several election cycles like the much of Arkansas. The last Democrat to carry the city of Foreman was John Kerry in 2004.

Foreman city vote by party in presidential elections
Year	Democratic	Republican	Third Parties
2020	28.19% 117	66.27% 275	5.54% 23
2016	31.47% 135	65.73% 282	2.80% 12
2012	35.41% 142	62.09% 249	2.50% 10
2008	35.76% 123	59.30% 204	4.94% 17
2004	57.77% 212	41.69% 153	0.54% 2
2000	60.56% 261	36.43% 157	3.01% 13

== Education ==
Public educatIon for elementary and secondary students is provided by the Foreman School District, including Foreman High School (grades 7 through 12) and Foreman Elementary School (kindergarten through sixth grade).

== Notable people ==
- Marion H. Crank, former state representative and Speaker of the Arkansas House of Representatives who was the Democratic gubernatorial nominee in 1968, having been narrowly defeated by incumbent Republican Winthrop Rockefeller.
- Jimmy "Preacher" Ellis, blues singer and guitarist
- Charles Jackson French, World War II Hero
- James T. Horn, country music singer
- Tracy Lawrence, country music singer
- Marshall Wright, Democratic member of the Arkansas House of Representatives from St. Francis County; graduated from Foreman High School
