= Brundidge =

Brundidge could refer to:

- Brundidge, Alabama, United States, a city
- Brundidge Building, a commercial building in Hope, Arkansas, United States
- Myles Brundidge, American curler
- Sheletta Brundidge, American children's author
- Stephen Brundidge Jr., American lawyer and politician
