= Southwestern Proving Ground Officers Quarters Historic District =

Historic district in Arkansas, United States

- U.S. National Register of Historic Places
- U.S. Historic district
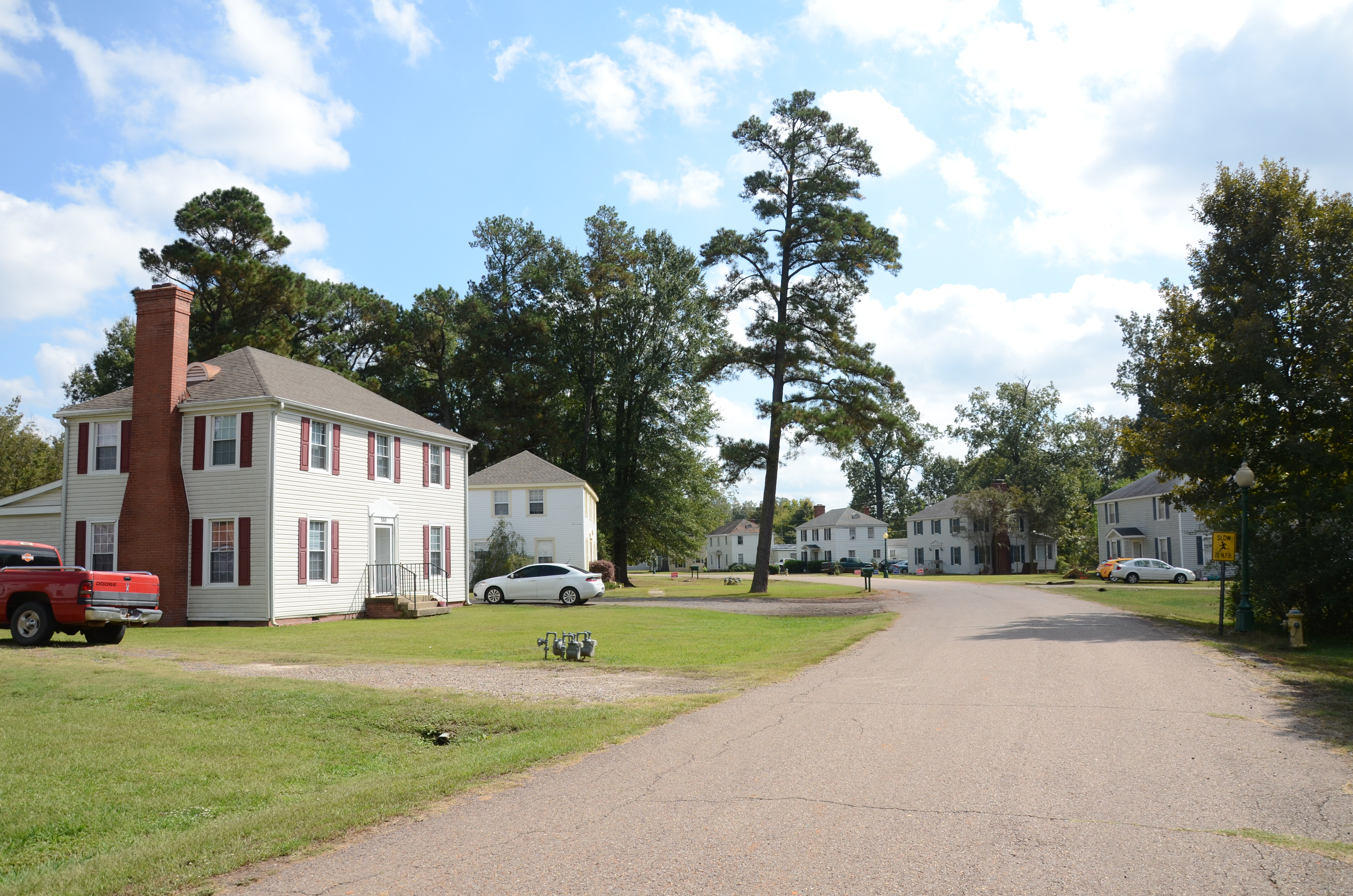

- Location within Arkansas Location within the United States
- Location: 359-383 Oakhaven, Oakhaven, Arkansas
- Coordinates: 33.72935°N 93.62143°W
- Area: 70 acres (28 ha)
- Built: 1941
- Architectural style: Colonial Revival
- NRHP reference No.: 08000437
- Added to NRHP: July 8, 2008

The Southwestern Proving Ground Officers Quarters Historic District is a residential historic district encompassing most of the town of Oakhaven, Arkansas. Located at the western end of Oakhaven Road, the district includes 20 houses built in 1941 to provide housing for military officers serving at the Southwestern Proving Ground, of which this area was then a part. After World War II came to an end, the properties were sold off to local veterans, who incorporated Oakhaven soon afterward. The houses are all two story wood-frame structures resting on brick foundations. Most of the houses have hip roofs, although those reserved for the highest-ranking officers had gable roofs. They are typically three bays wide with a center entry, and feature modest Colonial Revival styling.

The district was listed on the National Register of Historic Places in 2008.

== See also ==
- Southwestern Proving Ground Building No. 4
- Southwestern Proving Ground Building No. 5
- Southwestern Proving Ground Building No. 129
- National Register of Historic Places listings in Hempstead County, Arkansas
