= Southwestern Proving Ground Building No. 5 =

- U.S. National Register of Historic Places
- Location within Arkansas Location within the United States
- Nearest city: Hope, Arkansas
- Coordinates: 33°44′51″N 93°36′21″W
- Area: less than one acre
- Built: 1941
- Built by: W.E. Callahan Construction Co.
- Architect: Howard, Needles, Tammen & Bergendorf
- Architectural style: Plain Traditional
- MPS: World War II Home Front Efforts in Arkansas, MPS
- NRHP reference No.: 09001247
- Added to NRHP: January 21, 2010

The Southwestern Proving Ground Building No. 5 is an ammunition storage bunker at 259 Hempstead County Road 279 in Oakhaven, Arkansas, northwest of the city of Hope.

It is located on property that was once part of the Southwestern Proving Ground, a major military facility during World War II whose largest portion was transformed into Hope Municipal Airport.

Building No. 5 is a single-story concrete structure with a rounded roof, covered in earth, and with a heavy steel door facing northwest. It is one of three ammunition bunkers built on the proving ground (the others, Building Nos. 32 and 33, also survive). The building is used as storage by a private owner.

The building was listed on the National Register of Historic Places in 2010.

== See also ==
- Southwestern Proving Ground Building No. 4, located on the same property
- Southwestern Proving Ground Building No. 129, located on the same property
- Southwestern Proving Ground Officers Quarters Historic District
- National Register of Historic Places listings in Hempstead County, Arkansas
