= National Register of Historic Places listings in Hempstead County, Arkansas =

Location of Hempstead County in Arkansas

This is a list of the National Register of Historic Places listings in Hempstead County, Arkansas.

This is intended to be a complete list of the properties and districts on the National Register of Historic Places in Hempstead County, Arkansas, United States. The locations of National Register properties and districts for which the latitude and longitude coordinates are included below, may be seen in a map.

There are 28 properties and districts listed on the National Register in the county, including 1 National Historic Landmark. Another 7 properties were once listed but have been removed.

Contents: Counties in Arkansas
- Arkansas
- Ashley
- Baxter
- Benton
- Boone
- Bradley
- Calhoun
- Carroll
- Chicot
- Clark
- Clay
- Cleburne
- Cleveland
- Columbia
- Conway
- Craighead
- Crawford
- Crittenden
- Cross
- Dallas
- Desha
- Drew
- Faulkner
- Franklin
- Fulton
- Garland
- Grant
- Greene
- Hempstead
- Hot Spring
- Howard
- Independence
- Izard
- Jackson
- Jefferson
- Johnson
- Lafayette
- Lawrence
- Lee
- Lincoln
- Little River
- Logan
- Lonoke
- Madison
- Marion
- Miller
- Mississippi
- Monroe
- Montgomery
- Nevada
- Newton
- Ouachita
- Perry
- Phillips
- Pike
- Poinsett
- Polk
- Pope
- Prairie
- Pulaski (Little Rock)
- Randolph
- St. Francis
- Saline
- Scott
- Searcy
- Sebastian
- Sevier
- Sharp
- Stone
- Union
- Van Buren
- Washington
- White
- Woodruff
- Yell

This National Park Service list is complete through NPS recent listings posted December 19, 2025.

== Current listings ==
	Name on the Register	Image	Date listed	Location	City or town	Description
1	Brundidge Building	Brundidge Building	March 27, 1990 (#90000431)	W. 2nd St. 33°40′03″N 93°35′32″W	Hope	
2	Bill Clinton Birthplace	Bill Clinton Birthplace	May 19, 1994 (#94000472)	117 S. Hervey St. 33°40′02″N 93°35′47″W	Hope	
3	Confederate State Capitol	Confederate State Capitol	May 19, 1972 (#72000203)	Main St. 33°46′43″N 93°40′41″W	Washington	One of the Camden Expedition Sites, a National Historic Landmark consisting of sites in several counties
4	Dooley's Ferry Fortifications Historic District	Dooley's Ferry Fortifications Historic District	September 22, 2004 (#04001031)	On the bluffs above Dooley's Ferry; 33°30′47″N 93°44′32″W	Spring Hill	
5	First Presbyterian Church		January 12, 2024 (#100009766)	701 South Main Street; 33°39′47″N 93°35′24″W	Hope	
6	Foster House	Foster House	June 5, 1991 (#91000683)	420 S. Spruce St. 33°40′00″N 93°35′04″W	Hope	1918 American Foursquare with Prairie and Craftsman details
7	Goodlett Gin	Goodlett Gin	January 17, 1975 (#75000387)	799 Franklin St. 33°46′48″N 93°40′41″W	Washington	
8	E.S. Greening House		July 9, 1987 (#87001147)	707 E. Division St. 33°40′16″N 93°34′52″W	Hope	burned down
9	Hempstead County Courthouse	Hempstead County Courthouse	May 19, 1994 (#94000442)	Northwestern corner of the junction of 5th and Washington Sts. 33°39′52″N 93°35′55″W	Hope	1939 Art Deco courthouse
10	Hope Girl Scout Little House	Hope Girl Scout Little House	January 27, 2015 (#14001199)	NE. corner of Jones St. & Fair Park; 33°39′31″N 93°36′25″W	Hope	
11	Hope Historic Commercial District	Hope Historic Commercial District	July 28, 1995 (#95000905)	Roughly bounded by the Union Pacific railroad tracks, Louisiana St., 3rd St. and Walnut St. 33°40′04″N 93°35′32″W	Hope	
12	McRae House	McRae House	December 22, 1982 (#82000826)	1113 E. 3rd St. 33°40′04″N 93°34′45″W	Hope	
13	Missouri Pacific Railroad Depot-Hope	Missouri Pacific Railroad Depot-Hope	June 11, 1992 (#92000610)	North of the junction of E. Division and Main Sts. 33°40′08″N 93°35′32″W	Hope	Reopened as Hope (Amtrak station) on April 4, 2013.
14	Mounds Cemetery		June 5, 2013 (#13000350)	County Road 13 northwest of Hempstead; 33°46′48″N 93°49′22″W	Columbus	Resting place of Hempstead County's first pioneers, built around a pair of Indian mounds
15	North Elm Street Historic District	North Elm Street Historic District	July 28, 1995 (#95000904)	Roughly bounded by the Union Pacific railroad tracks, Hervey St., G Ave. and Hazel St. 33°40′17″N 93°35′39″W	Hope	1890-1945 collection of 54 structures in various architectural styles
16	North Washington Street Historic District	North Washington Street Historic District	July 28, 1995 (#95000903)	Eastern side of N. Washington St. between B and E Sts. 33°40′12″N 93°35′58″W	Hope	
17	Oak Grove Missionary Baptist Church	Oak Grove Missionary Baptist Church	May 29, 2003 (#03000463)	County Road 16; 33°49′57″N 93°36′39″W	Blevins	
18	Grandison D. Royston House	Grandison D. Royston House	June 21, 1971 (#71000124)	Water St., southwest of Columbus St. 33°46′20″N 93°40′54″W	Washington	
19	St. Mark's Episcopal Church	St. Mark's Episcopal Church	May 6, 1976 (#76000414)	3rd and Elm Sts. 33°39′59″N 93°35′33″W	Hope	1904 church in Gothic Revival style
20	Saint Paul Methodist Church Cemetery, Historic Section	Saint Paul Methodist Church Cemetery, Historic Section	September 30, 2024 (#100010871)	6517 US Highway 278; 33°50′50″N 93°45′08″W	Ozan	
21	Southwestern Proving Ground Airport Historic District	Southwestern Proving Ground Airport Historic District	June 10, 1999 (#99000230)	Hope Municipal Airport, Airport Rd. 33°43′17″N 93°39′03″W	Hope	1941 munitions testing complex
22	Southwestern Proving Ground Building No. 4		January 22, 2009 (#08001339)	259 County Road 279; 33°44′28″N 93°36′38″W	Hope	
23	Southwestern Proving Ground Building No. 5		January 22, 2009 (#09001247)	259 County Road 279; 33°44′28″N 93°36′38″W	Hope	
24	Southwestern Proving Ground Building No. 129		January 29, 2009 (#08001373)	195 County Road 279; 33°44′23″N 93°36′35″W	Hope	
25	Southwestern Proving Ground Officers Quarters Historic District	Southwestern Proving Ground Officers Quarters Historic District	July 8, 2008 (#08000437)	359-383 Oakhaven; 33°43′44″N 93°37′10″W	Oakhaven	
26	Ward-Jackson House	Ward-Jackson House	September 14, 1989 (#89001421)	122 N. Louisiana; 33°40′10″N 93°35′43″W	Hope	1903 Victorian house
27	Washington Confederate Monument	Washington Confederate Monument	December 6, 1996 (#96001410)	US 278, northwest of its junction with Highway 32; 33°46′30″N 93°41′28″W	Washington	
28	Washington Historic District	Washington Historic District	June 20, 1972 (#72000204)	Boundaries correspond to original 1824 plat of city 33°40′51″N 93°38′53″W	Washington	

== Former listings ==
	Name on the Register	Image	Date listed	Date removed	Location	City or town	Description
1	Carrigan House	Carrigan House	July 20, 1978 (#78000591)	January 23, 2008	704 W. Avenue B	Hope	Delisted due to extensive alterations.
2	Columbus Presbyterian Church		November 17, 1982 (#82000823)	June 12, 2013	Highway 73; 33°46′42″N 93°49′03″W	Columbus	Destroyed by fire
3	Ethridge House	Ethridge House	December 1, 1993 (#93001259)	January 2, 2024	511 N. Main St. 33°40′25″N 93°35′37″W	Hope	
4	Foster House	Foster House	December 22, 1982 (#82000825)	September 30, 2019	303 N. Hervey St. 33°40′10″N 93°35′49″W	Hope	
5	Dr. Thomas S. Jacques House		November 3, 1989 (#89001940)	January 29, 2013	Northwest of McCaskill	McCaskill	
6	K. G. McRae House		May 4, 1976 (#76000413)	January 6, 2000	3rd and Edgewood Streets	Hope	Destroyed by fire in 1987. Not to be confused with the McRae House (82000826), which still stands and remains listed above.
7	Ozan Methodist Church		November 5, 1982 (#82000827)	September 17, 1999	Mulberry St.	Ozan	
8	Nesburt T. Ruggles House	Nesburt T. Ruggles House	December 9, 1994 (#94001463)	May 5, 2025	Eastern side of Highway 32, southeast of Shover Springs; 33°36′59″N 93°31′33″W	Shover Springs	

== See also ==
- List of National Historic Landmarks in Arkansas
- National Register of Historic Places listings in Arkansas
