= Southwestern Proving Ground Building No. 129 =

- U.S. National Register of Historic Places
- Location within Arkansas Location within the United States
- Location: 195 Hempstead Co. Rd. 279, Hope, Arkansas
- Coordinates: 33°44′22″N 93°36′23″W
- Area: less than one acre
- Built: 1941
- Built by: W.E. Callahan Construction Co.
- Architect: Howard, Needles, Tammen & Bergendorf
- Architectural style: Plain Traditional
- MPS: World War II Home Front Efforts in Arkansas, MPS
- NRHP reference No.: 08001373
- Added to NRHP: January 29, 2009

The Southwestern Proving Ground Building No. 129 is a military powder magazine at 195 Hempstead County Road 279 in Oakhaven, Arkansas, northwest of the city of Hope. It is located on property that was once part of the Southwestern Proving Ground, a major military facility during World War II whose largest portion was transformed into Hope Municipal Airport. Building No. 129 is a single-story brick and tile structure, with two bays. There are red steel doors located on the northeast and southwest facades. The roof is gabled, and covered in fire-resistant asbestos sheeting, with vents at the ridge, and an elaborate lightning-protection system. It was built in 1941 to house smokeless gunpowder, and is one of only two brick buildings from the proving ground to survive. It is now used by a private owner for storage.

The building was listed on the National Register of Historic Places in 2009.

== See also ==
- Southwestern Proving Ground Building No. 4, located on the same property
- Southwestern Proving Ground Building No. 5, located on the same property
- Southwestern Proving Ground Officers Quarters Historic District
- National Register of Historic Places listings in Hempstead County, Arkansas
