= Oak Grove Missionary Baptist Church =

Historic church in Arkansas, United States

- U.S. National Register of Historic Places
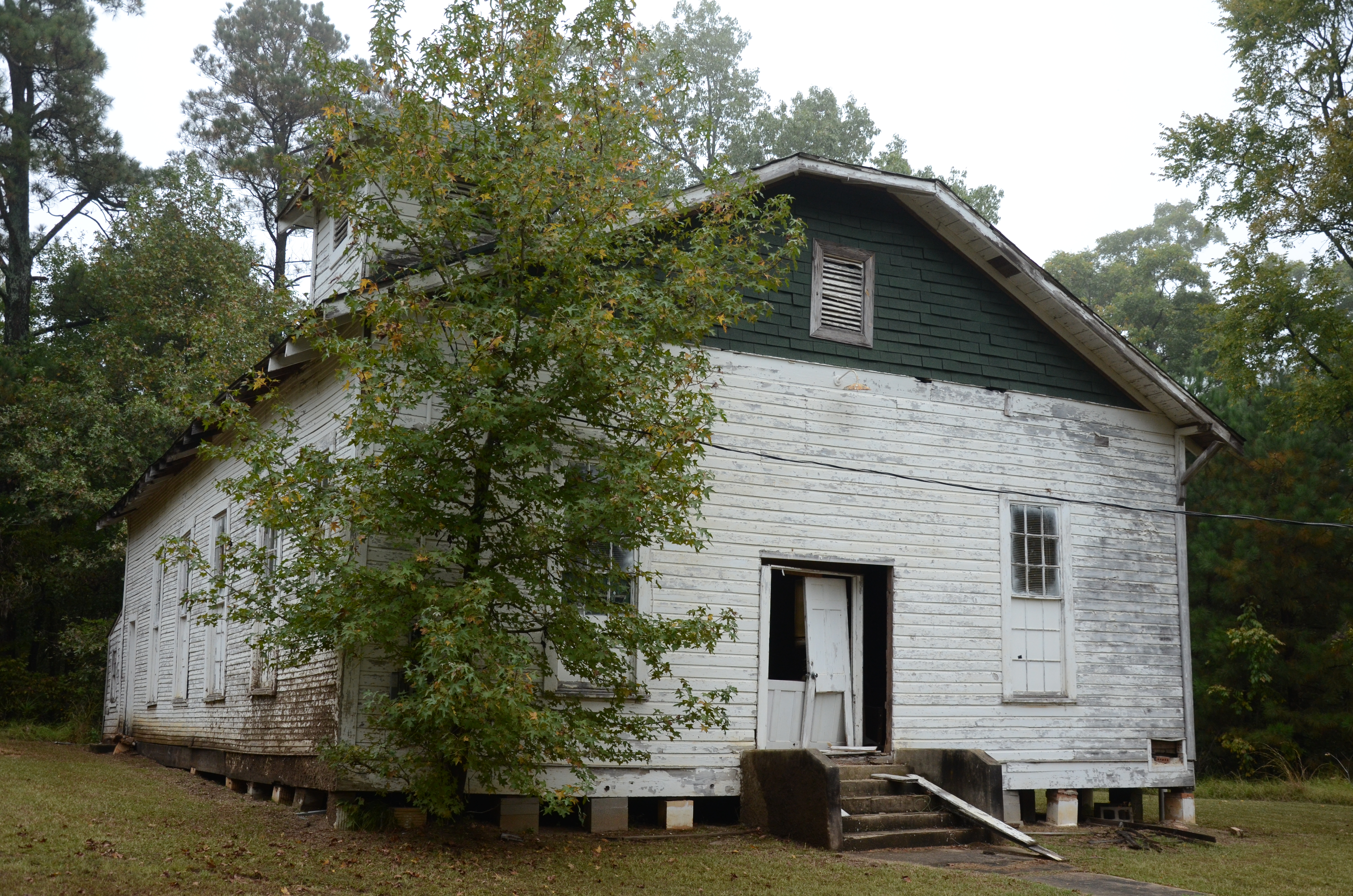

- Location within Arkansas Location within the United States
- Nearest city: Blevins, Arkansas
- Coordinates: 33°49′57″N 93°36′39″W
- Area: 2 acres (0.81 ha)
- Built: 1942
- Architect: Hill, Tony
- Architectural style: Plain/Traditional
- NRHP reference No.: 03000463
- Added to NRHP: May 29, 2003

The Oak Grove Missionary Baptist Church is a historic church on Hempstead County Route 16, about 3 miles (4.8 km) south of the small town of Blevins, Arkansas. It is a single-story wood-frame structure, with a Jerkinhead roof, and a steeple topped by a hip roof. It was built in 1942, using in part materials recycled from an 1870 church which was dismantled due to the establishment of the Southwestern Proving Ground in 1940. The church serves an African-American congregation that was, prior to its relocation, in a community that was originally named for, and supported by, Arkansas Senator James Kimbrough Jones. The church property includes a small wood-frame Sunday school building, constructed about the same time as the church, and a cemetery.

The church was listed on the National Register of Historic Places in 2003.

== See also ==
- National Register of Historic Places listings in Hempstead County, Arkansas
