= North Washington Street Historic District =

North Washington Street Historic District may refer to:

- North Washington Street Historic District (Hope, Arkansas), listed on the National Register of Historic Places (NRHP) in Hempstead County
- North Washington Street Historic District (Bloomington, Indiana), NRHP-listed in Monroe County
- North Washington Street Historic District (Tullahoma, Tennessee), NRHP-listed in Coffee County
- North Washington Street Historic District (Watertown, Wisconsin), NRHP-listed in Jefferson County

== See also ==
- Washington Street Historic District (disambiguation)
