= Goodlett =

Goodlett is a surname. Notable people with the surname include:

- Carlton Benjamin Goodlett (1914–1997), American physician, newspaper publisher and civil rights activist
- John A. Goodlett, American politician
- Ray Goodlett, American soccer player
- Sasha Goodlett (born 1990), American women's basketball player

== See also ==
- Goodlett Gin, a historic cotton gin in Historic Washington State Park in Hempstead County, Arkansas, United States
