= Southwestern Proving Ground Building No. 4 =

- U.S. National Register of Historic Places
- Location within Arkansas Location within the United States
- Nearest city: Hope, Arkansas
- Coordinates: 33°44′54″N 93°36′26″W
- Area: less than one acre
- Built: 1941
- Built by: W.E. Callahan Construction Co.
- Architect: Howard, Needles, Tammen & Bergendorf
- Architectural style: Plain/Traditional
- MPS: World War II Home Front Efforts in Arkansas, MPS
- NRHP reference No.: 08001339
- Added to NRHP: January 22, 2009

The Southwestern Proving Ground Building No. 4 is a gun shelter and stockade at 259 Hempstead County Road 279 in Oakhaven, Arkansas, northwest of the city of Hope. It is located on property that was once part of the Southwestern Proving Ground, a major military facility during World War II whose largest portion was transformed into Hope Municipal Airport. Building No. 4 is a roofless concrete structure with seven bays open to the southeast, with smaller openings on the northwest side. It was built in 1941 to replicate typical stockaded gun placements in field conditions, its two-foot-thick walls designed to isolate gun crews from the dangers of fire and exploding ammunition. The building is now used by a private owner for storage and agricultural purposes.

The building was listed on the National Register of Historic Places in 2009.

== See also ==
- Southwestern Proving Ground Building No. 5, located on the same property
- Southwestern Proving Ground Building No. 129, located on the same property
- Southwestern Proving Ground Officers Quarters Historic District
- National Register of Historic Places listings in Hempstead County, Arkansas
