= Ethridge House (Hope, Arkansas) =

Historic house in Arkansas, United States

- Formerly listed on the U.S. National Register of Historic Places
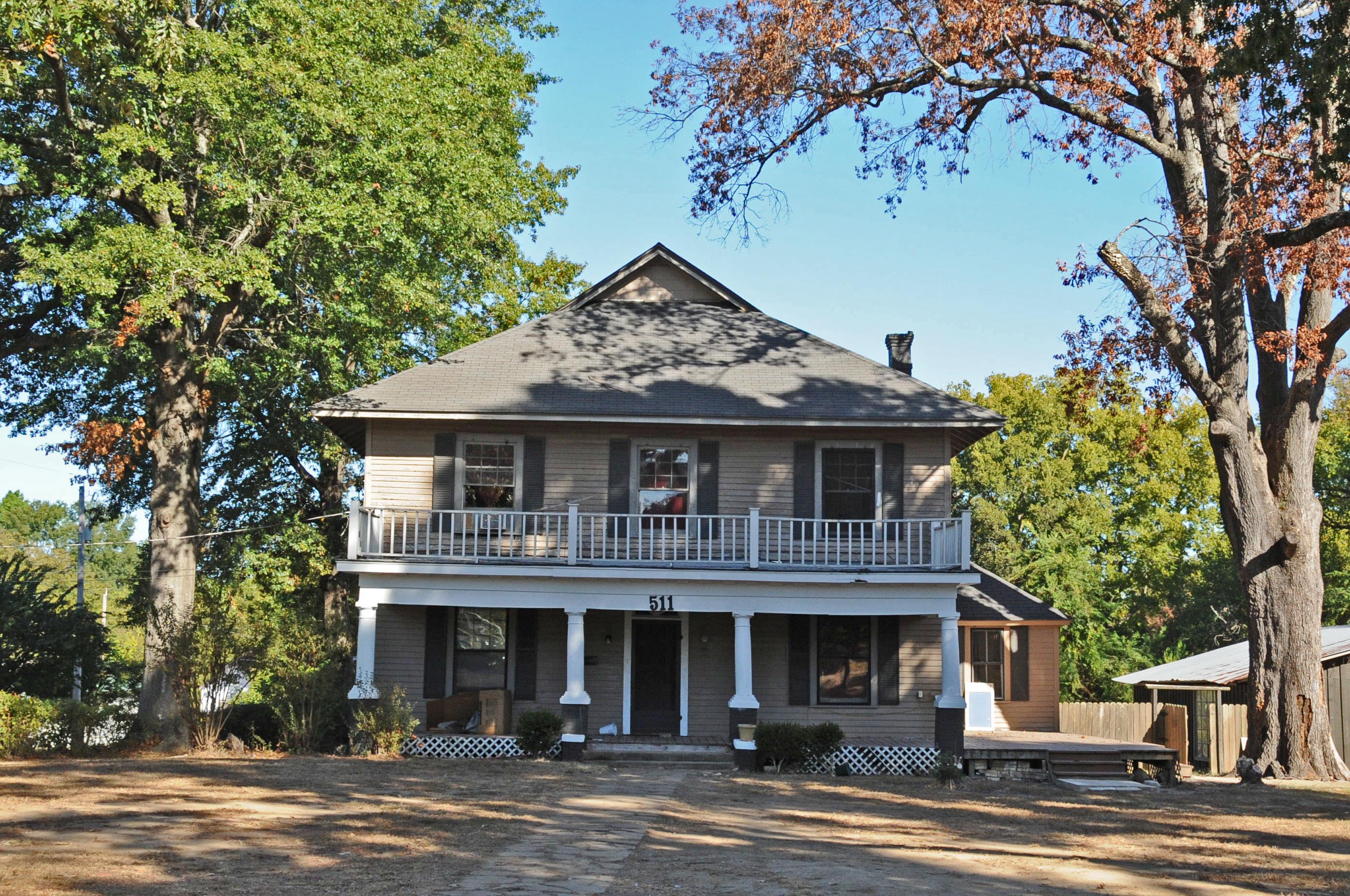

- Location within Arkansas Location within the United States
- Location: 511 N. Main St., Hope, Arkansas
- Coordinates: 33°40′25″N 93°35′37″W
- Area: 4 acres (1.6 ha)
- Built: 1912
- Architectural style: Plain Traditional
- NRHP reference No.: 93001259

Significant dates
- Added to NRHP: December 1, 1993
- Removed from NRHP: January 2, 2024

The Ethridge House is a historic house at 511 North Main Street in Hope, Arkansas. It is a modest two-story wood-frame structure, built in 1894 and altered c. 1912, with a front porch supported by Tuscan columns. The house was built for Richard Ethridge, owner of a drug store in the city, and is significant for its longtime association with his daughter, Miss Mabel Ethridge, who became a fixture in the public schools of Hope, teaching the performing arts for forty years. She was notably influential on many of her students, and opened her home to current and former students for social events in the summer.

The house was listed on the National Register of Historic Places in 1993. It was delisted in 2024.

== See also ==
- National Register of Historic Places listings in Hempstead County, Arkansas
