= President William Jefferson Clinton Birthplace Home National Historic Site =

National Historic Site of the United States

- U.S. National Register of Historic Places
- U.S. Historic district – Contributing property
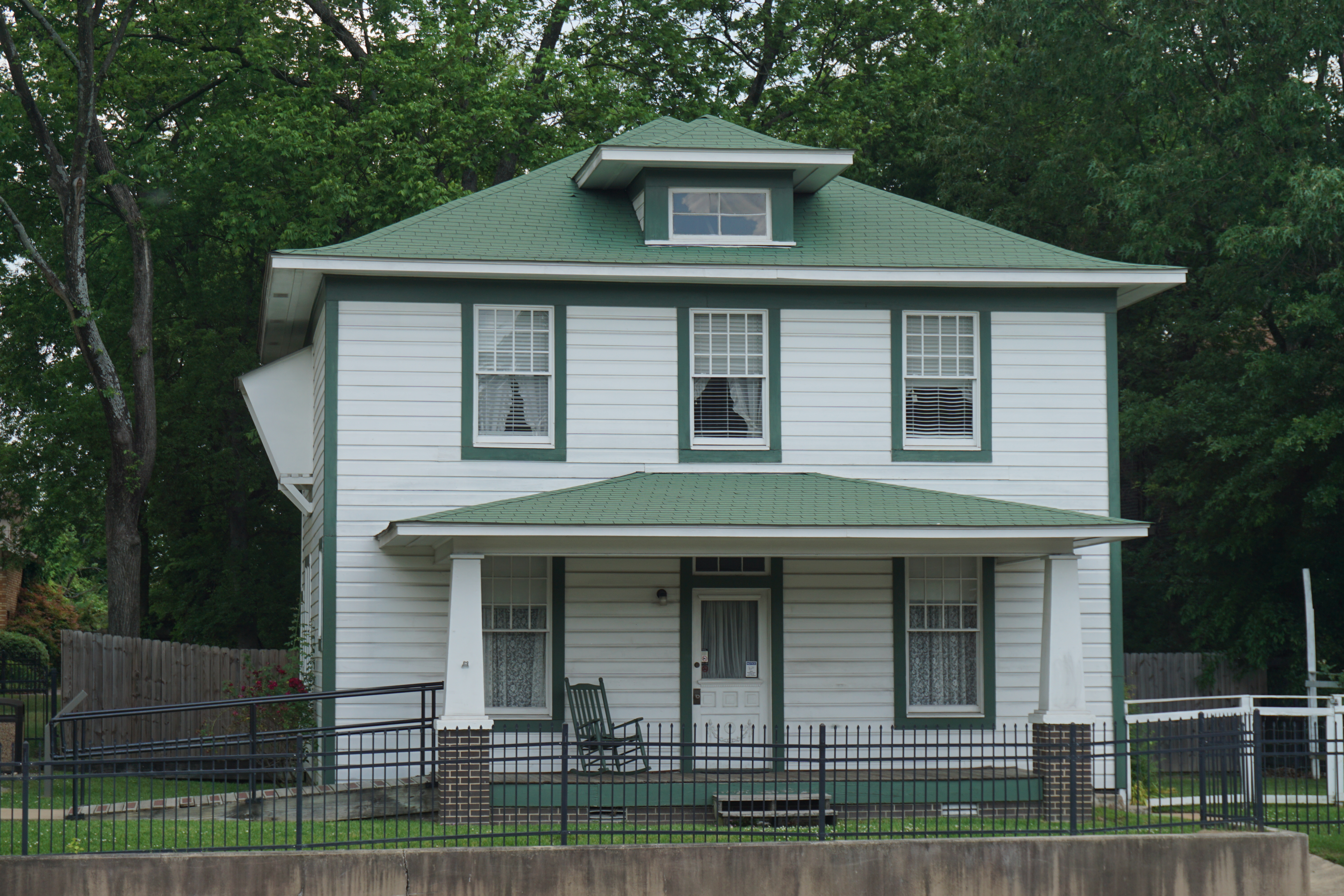
- President William Jefferson Clinton Birthplace Home National Historic Site

- Location within Arkansas Location within the United States
- Location: 117 S. Hervey St., Hope, Arkansas
- Coordinates: 33°40′1.82″N 93°35′47.36″W
- Area: 1.00 acre (0.0040 km^{2})
- Built: 1917
- Architect: H. S. Garrett
- Visitation: 6,821 (2025)
- Website: www.nps.gov/wicl/index.htm
- Part of: North Elm Street Historic District (ID95000904)
- NRHP reference No.: 94000472

Significant dates
- Added to NRHP: May 19, 1994
- Designated CP: July 28, 1995

The President William Jefferson Clinton Birthplace Home National Historic Site is located in Hope, Arkansas. Built in 1917 by H. S. Garrett, in this house the 42nd president of the United States, Bill Clinton, spent the first four years of his life, having been born on August 19, 1946, at Julia Chester Hospital in Hope, Arkansas. The house was owned by Clinton's maternal grandparents, Edith Grisham and James Eldridge Cassidy, and they cared for him when his mother, Virginia, was away working as an anesthetist in New Orleans.

On May 19, 1994, the site was added to the National Register of Historic Places (as "Bill Clinton Birthplace"). Tours were offered by the Clinton Birthplace Foundation. In accordance with the Omnibus Public Land Management Act of 2009 (Pub. L. 111–11 (text) (PDF)§7002), the Secretary of the Interior accepted the property on December 14, 2010, establishing it as a national historic site and a unit of the National Park System. This change in status was originally proposed by Senator Mark Pryor of Arkansas. Bill Clinton and Secretary of the Interior Ken Salazar formally dedicated the site on April 16, 2011.

The museum is a stop on the "Billgrimage", which includes the Clinton House in Fayetteville and the Bill Clinton Presidential Library, among other sites.

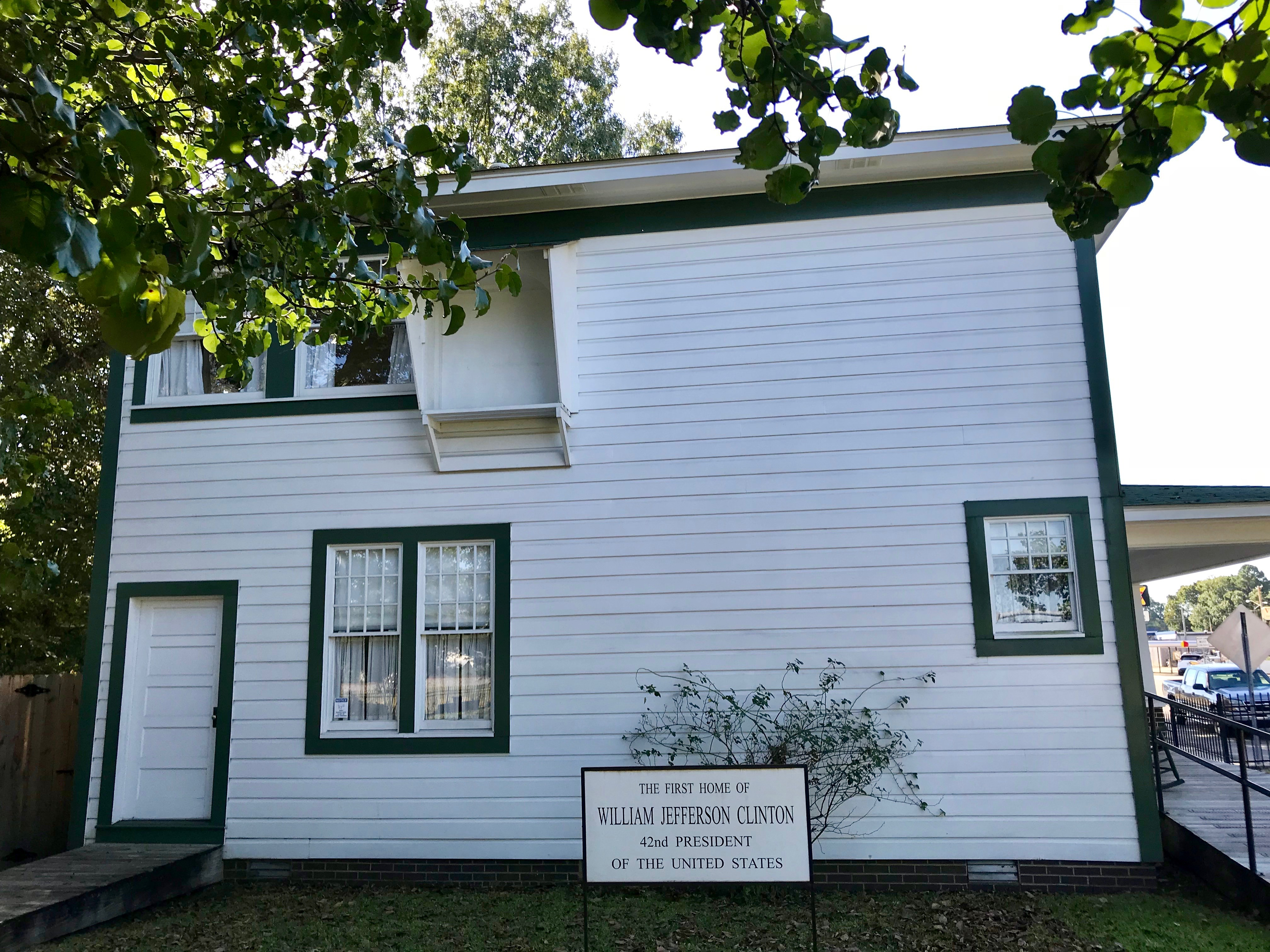
Side view

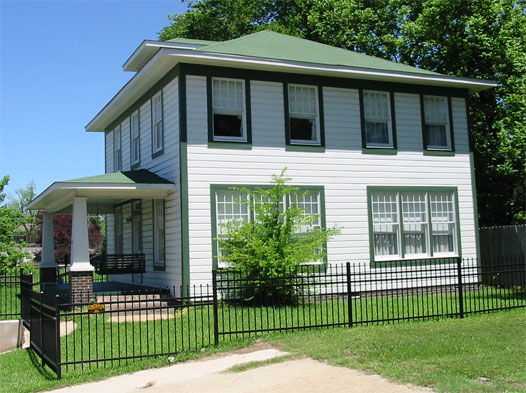
Other side view

== See also ==
- List of residences of presidents of the United States
- National Register of Historic Places listings in Hempstead County, Arkansas
- List of areas in the United States National Park System#National Historic Sites
- Presidential memorials in the United States
