= Hempstead County Courthouse =

Courthouse in Hope, Arkansas

- U.S. National Register of Historic Places
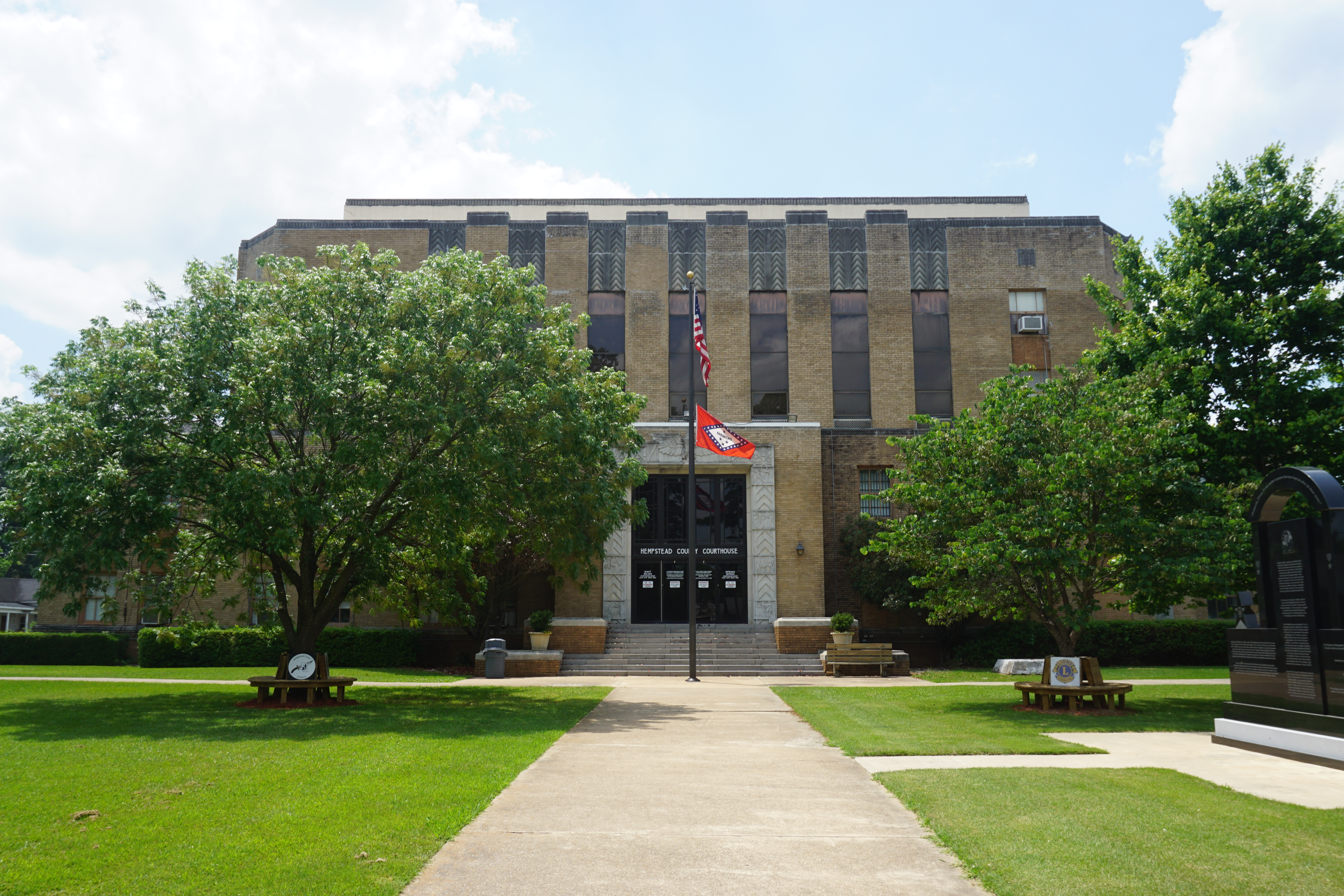

- Location within Arkansas Location within the United States
- Location: NW corner of 5th and Washington Sts., Hope, Arkansas
- Coordinates: 33°39′52″N 93°35′55″W
- Area: 2.3 acres (0.93 ha)
- Built: 1939
- Built by: B.W. Edwards
- Architect: McAninch and Anderson
- Architectural style: Art Deco
- NRHP reference No.: 94000442
- Added to NRHP: May 19, 1994

The Hempstead County Courthouse is located at the northwest corner of 5th and Washington Streets in Hope, the county seat of Hempstead County, Arkansas United States. The five-story masonry structure was designed by the Little Rock firm of McAninch and Anderson, and built in 1939 with funding from the Public Works Administration, a depression-era federal jobs program. It is Hope's finest example of Art Deco architecture. Its entry is framed by a series of molded concrete panels, separated by inverted chevrons. The panels depict a variety of industries and professions, including construction, mining, medicine, defense, electricity, farming, and brickmaking. Chevron paneling is repeated in the cornice. The interior of the building is virtually unaltered, except for two courtrooms on the upper floors, which required complete renovation following a lightning-induced fire in 1979. The 1939 building has had a large jail added, but this was done in a sympathetic manner to the original's design.

The building was listed on the National Register of Historic Places in 1994.

== See also ==
- National Register of Historic Places listings in Hempstead County, Arkansas
