= Goodlett Gin =

- U.S. National Register of Historic Places
- U.S. Historic district – Contributing property
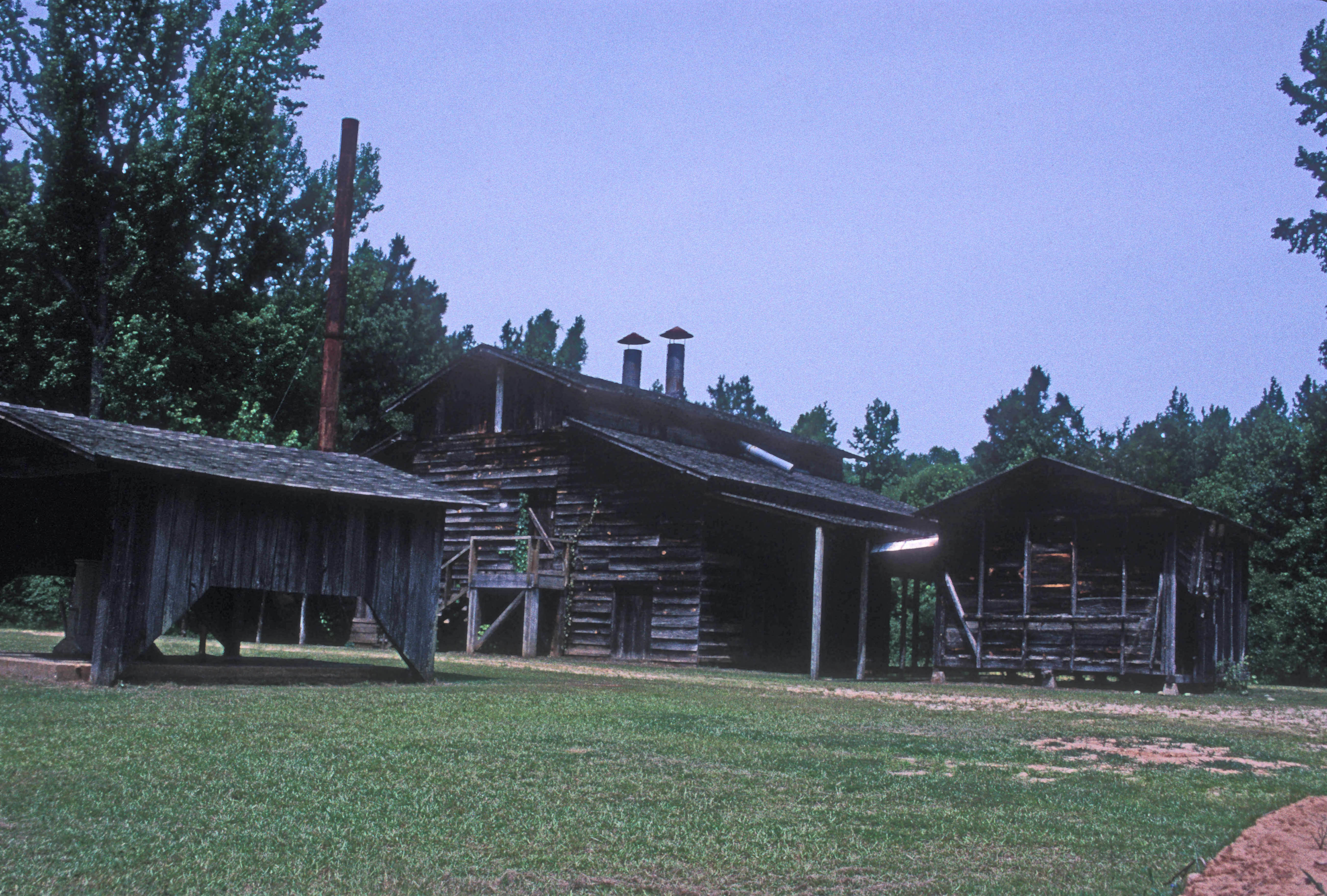

- Location within Arkansas Location within the United States
- Location: 799 Franklin St., Washington, Arkansas
- Coordinates: 33°46′42″N 93°40′40″W
- Area: 1 acre (0.40 ha)
- Built by: Captain Dave Goodlett
- Part of: Washington Historic District (ID72000204)
- NRHP reference No.: 75000387

Significant dates
- Added to NRHP: January 17, 1975
- Designated CP: June 20, 1972

The Goodlett Gin is a historic cotton gin in Historic Washington State Park in Hempstead County, Arkansas. It was built in 1883 by David Goodlett, and was originally located near Ozan before it was moved to the state park in the late 1970s. The only known operational steam gin in the United States, It was fitted with a steam engine in 1898, and received major servicing in the 1930s and 1950s.

The gin was listed on the National Register of Historic Places in 1975.

== See also ==
- National Register of Historic Places listings in Hempstead County, Arkansas
