= Foster House (303 North Hervey Street, Hope, Arkansas) =

Historic house in Arkansas, United States

- Formerly listed on the U.S. National Register of Historic Places
- U.S. Historic district – Contributing property
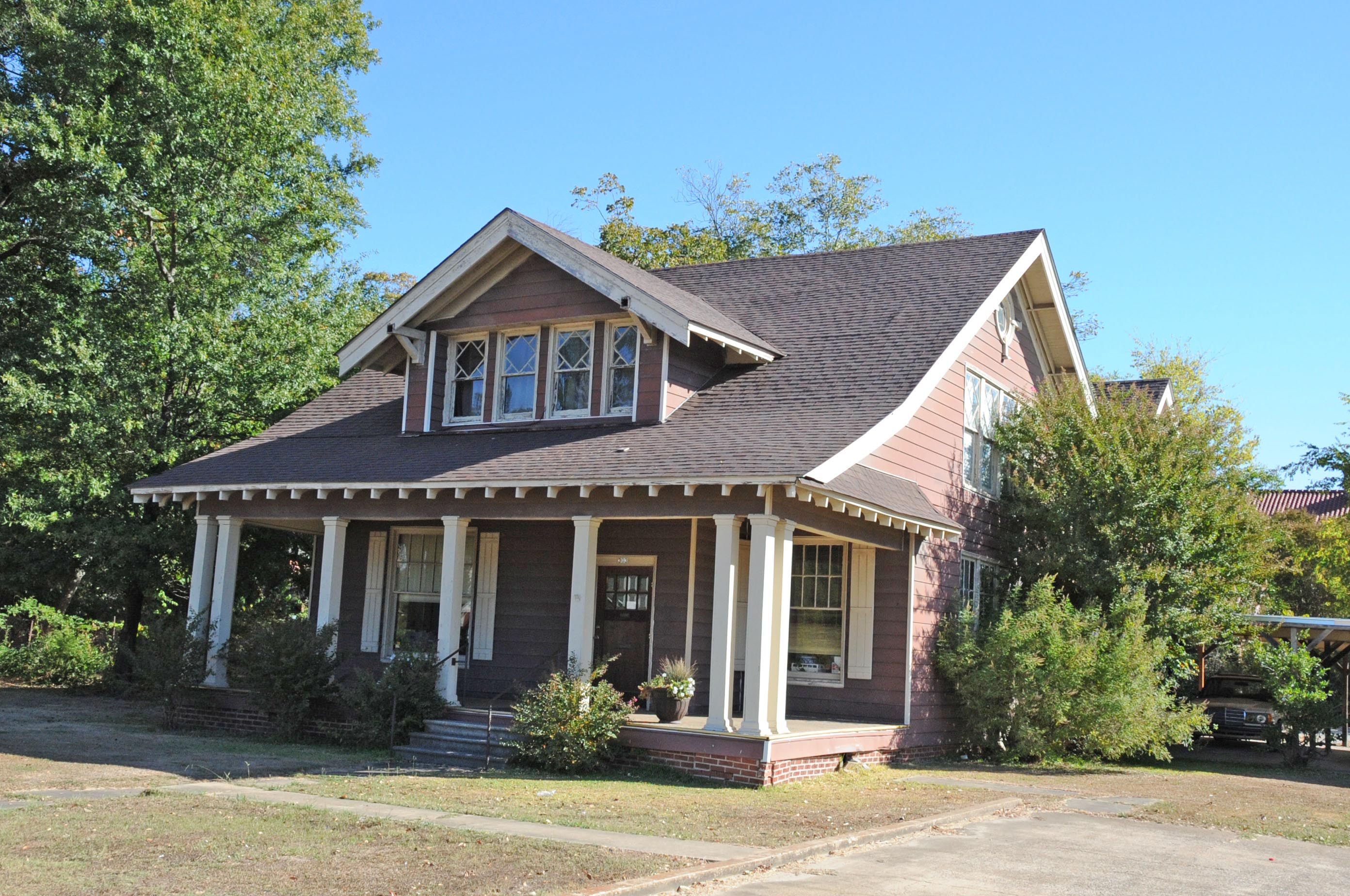

- Location within Arkansas Location within the United States
- Location: 303 N. Hervey St., Hope, Arkansas
- Coordinates: 33°40′10″N 93°35′49″W
- Area: less than one acre
- Built: 1912
- Architect: Charles L. Thompson
- Architectural style: Bungalow/Craftsman
- Part of: North Elm Street Historic District (ID95000904)
- MPS: Thompson, Charles L., Design Collection TR
- NRHP reference No.: 82000825

Significant dates
- Added to NRHP: December 22, 1982
- Designated CP: July 28, 1995
- Removed from NRHP: September 30, 2019

The Foster House is a historic house at 303 North Hervey Street in Hope, Arkansas. The two-story wood-frame house was designed by Charles L. Thompson and built c. 1912. It is a fine local example of Bungalow/Craftsman style, with flared eaves and a full-length front porch supported by box columns, which are, in a Thompson signature, clustered in threes at the corners. The porch roof, dormer, and eave have classic Craftsman features, including exposed rafters and brackets. It is one of three Thompson designs in Hope.

The house was listed on the National Register of Historic Places in 1982, and was delisted in 2019.

== See also ==
- National Register of Historic Places listings in Hempstead County, Arkansas
