= List of lakes of Hempstead County, Arkansas =

There are at least 37 named lakes and reservoirs in Hempstead County, Arkansas.

== Lakes ==
- 1916 Cut-off, 33°30′08″N 093°43′16″W, el. 226 feet (69 m)
- 1940 Cut-off Lake, 33°31′24″N 093°44′39″W, el. 226 feet (69 m)
- Beard Lake, 33°40′59″N 093°55′31″W, el. 249 feet (76 m)
- Bois d'Arc Lake, 33°33′19″N 093°42′09″W, el. 249 feet (76 m)
- Bushy Lake, 33°32′41″N 093°45′50″W, el. 236 feet (72 m)
- Clear Lake, 33°29′18″N 093°42′34″W, el. 236 feet (72 m)
- Cypress Lake, 33°41′11″N 093°57′16″W, el. 243 feet (74 m)
- Duck Pond, 33°33′58″N 093°46′46″W, el. 239 feet (73 m)
- First Old River Lake, 33°29′55″N 093°46′04″W, el. 233 feet (71 m)
- Fish Lake, 33°32′39″N 093°45′24″W, el. 233 feet (71 m)
- Horseshoe Lake, 33°56′13″N 093°31′11″W, el. 259 feet (79 m)
- Lake Vaughn, 33°37′20″N 093°50′30″W, el. 253 feet (77 m)
- Lower Red Lake, 33°30′39″N 093°42′49″W, el. 230 feet (70 m)
- Mud Lake, 33°36′19″N 093°47′51″W, el. 243 feet (74 m)
- Old River Lake, 33°35′15″N 093°48′07″W, el. 243 feet (74 m)
- Red Lake, 33°40′33″N 093°57′12″W, el. 239 feet (73 m)
- Red Lake, 33°34′40″N 093°47′20″W, el. 236 feet (72 m)

== Reservoirs ==
- Bridewells Lake, 33°37′45″N 093°34′10″W, el. 364 feet (111 m)
- Catfish Pond, 33°41′12″N 093°29′29″W, el. 285 feet (87 m)
- Erwin Lake, 33°54′06″N 093°44′43″W, el. 341 feet (104 m)
- H and P Lake, 33°47′58″N 093°36′53″W, el. 381 feet (116 m)
- Hawg Pond, 33°42′32″N 093°31′31″W, el. 285 feet (87 m)
- Lake Harris, 33°55′48″N 093°41′31″W, el. 502 feet (153 m)
- Millwood Lake, 33°41′45″N 093°57′41″W, el. 259 feet (79 m)
- North Fork Ozan Creek Watershed Site Reservoir, 33°55′42″N 093°46′19″W, el. 367 feet (112 m)
- North Fork Ozan Creek Watershed Site Reservoir, 33°59′48″N 093°47′25″W, el. 472 feet (144 m)
- Porter Lake, 33°43′36″N 093°40′26″W, el. 315 feet (96 m)
- Rocky Mound Pond, 33°40′34″N 093°29′53″W, el. 305 feet (93 m)
- Rolling Hills Pond, 33°40′20″N 093°29′59″W, el. 312 feet (95 m)
- Royston Lake One, 33°51′20″N 093°37′14″W, el. 325 feet (99 m)
- Royston Lake Three, 33°50′02″N 093°37′12″W, el. 413 feet (126 m)
- Royston Lake Two, 33°50′33″N 093°36′45″W, el. 381 feet (116 m)
- Smith Lake, 33°49′12″N 093°37′23″W, el. 436 feet (133 m)
- Sow Pond, 33°42′31″N 093°31′50″W, el. 295 feet (90 m)
- Stanley Lake Number One, 33°55′12″N 093°43′49″W, el. 374 feet (114 m)
- Stanley Lake Number Two, 33°54′36″N 093°44′55″W, el. 354 feet (108 m)
- Wino Lake, 33°39′14″N 093°30′08″W, el. 331 feet (101 m)

== See also ==
- List of lakes in Arkansas
