= Hope Girl Scout Little House =

Historic house in Arkansas, United States

- U.S. National Register of Historic Places
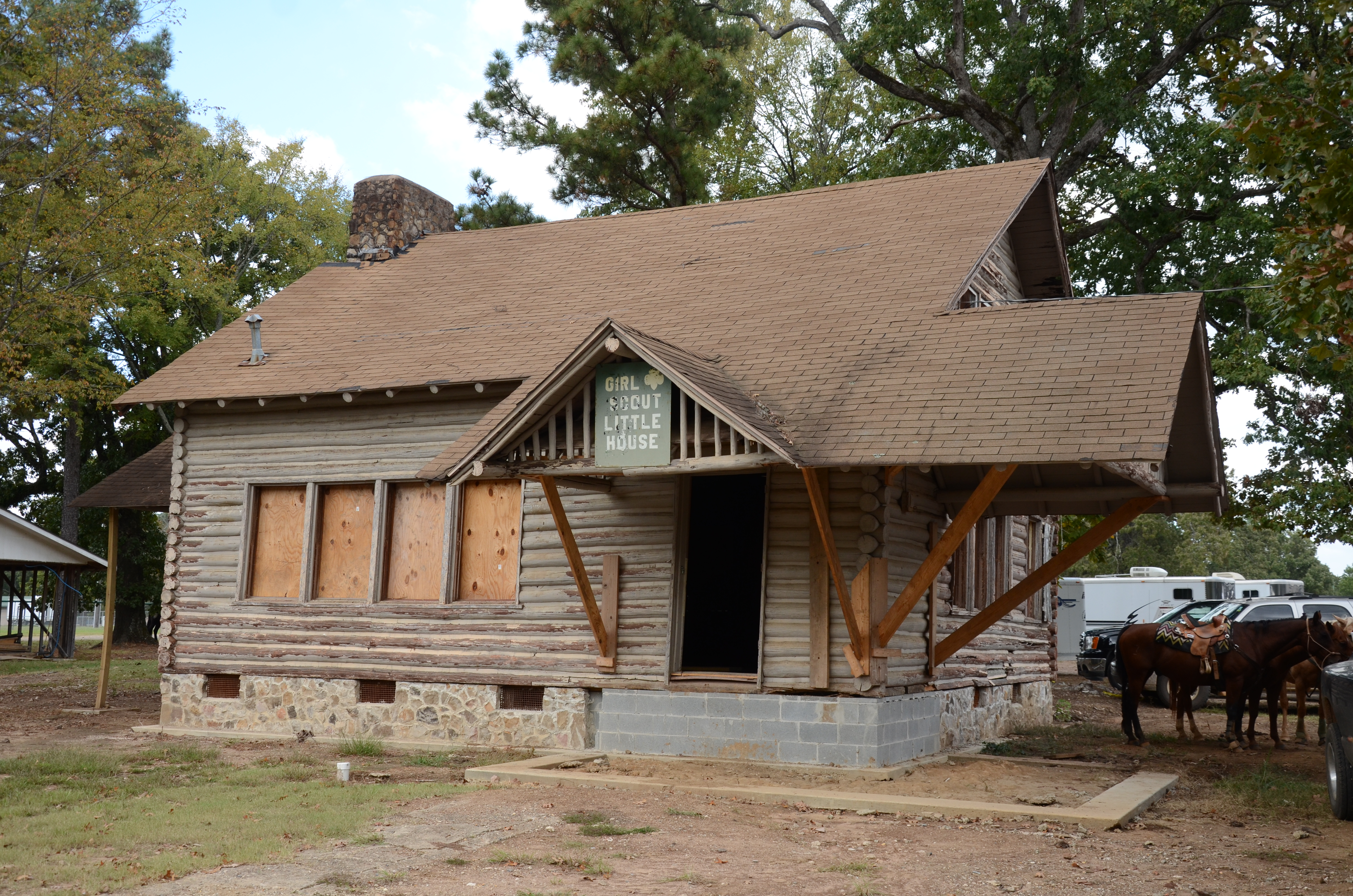

- Location within Arkansas Location within the United States
- Location: NE corner of Jones St. and Fair Park, Hope, Arkansas
- Coordinates: 33°39′31″N 93°36′25″W
- Area: less than one acre
- Built: 1938
- Architectural style: Rustic log cabin
- NRHP reference No.: 14001199
- Added to NRHP: January 27, 2015

The Hope Girl Scout Little House is a historic log house near the junction of Jones Street and Fair Park in Hope, Arkansas. It is a single-story log structure, built in 1938 with funding from the Works Progress Administration. It was designed by Washington, DC architect Donn Barber as a demonstration home for a family with modest income, and afterward served for a quarter century as the principal meeting place of the local Girl Scout organization.

The house was listed on the National Register of Historic Places in 2015.

== See also ==
- National Register of Historic Places listings in Hempstead County, Arkansas
