= Foster House (420 South Spruce Street, Hope, Arkansas) =

Historic house in Arkansas, United States

- U.S. National Register of Historic Places
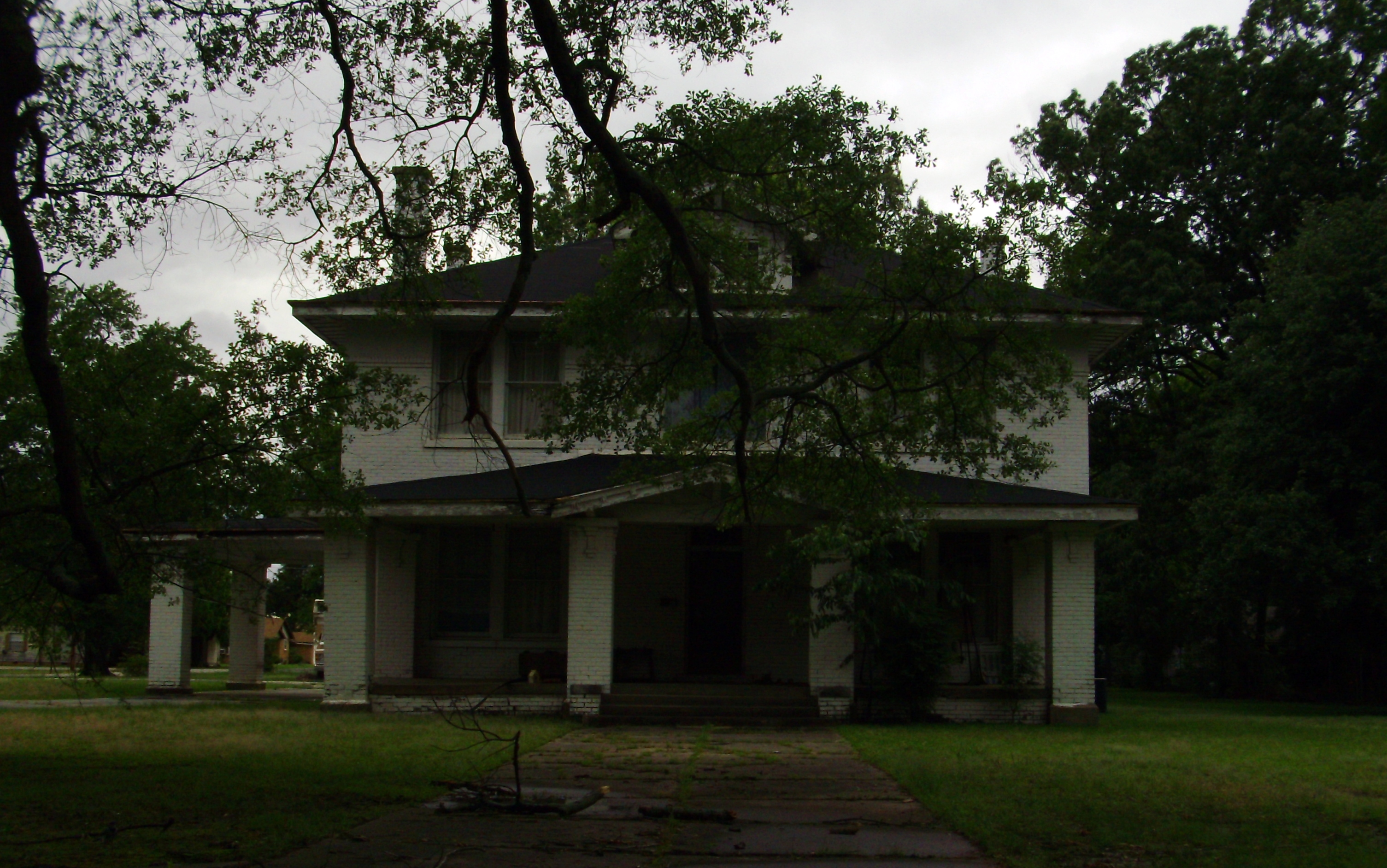

- Location within Arkansas Location within the United States
- Location: 420 S. Spruce St., Hope, Arkansas
- Coordinates: 33°40′0″N 93°35′4″W
- Area: less than one acre
- Built: 1917
- Architect: Witt, Siebert and Halsey
- Architectural style: Prairie School, Bungalow/American craftsman, Foursquare
- NRHP reference No.: 91000683
- Added to NRHP: June 5, 1991

The Foster House is a historic house at 420 North Spruce Street in Hope, Arkansas. The house was designed by Texarkana architects Witt, Siebert and Halsey, and built in 1918 for Leonidas Foster, a prominent local businessman, landowner, and cotton broker. It is a 2 1/2-story brick structure, with a hip roof pierced by a gable-roofed dormer. A porch supported by brick piers extends across the front facade, and is augmented by a porte-cochère on the left side. The house is an excellent local example of a Foursquare house with Craftsman and Prairie details.

The house was listed on the National Register of Historic Places in 1991.

== See also ==
- National Register of Historic Places listings in Hempstead County, Arkansas
