= Archie Shepperson =

American politician

Archer (Archie) Shepperson was a teacher, principal, and state legislator in Arkansas. He served in the Nineteenth General Assembly in 1873.

In 1871, he was a deputy sheriff. He was described in a newspaper account as being a fine gentleman. He and his wife had at least 4 children. He was appointed to the Hempstead County board of supervisors. He was involved in opening schools for "Colored" children.
