= Washington Confederate Monument =

- U.S. National Register of Historic Places
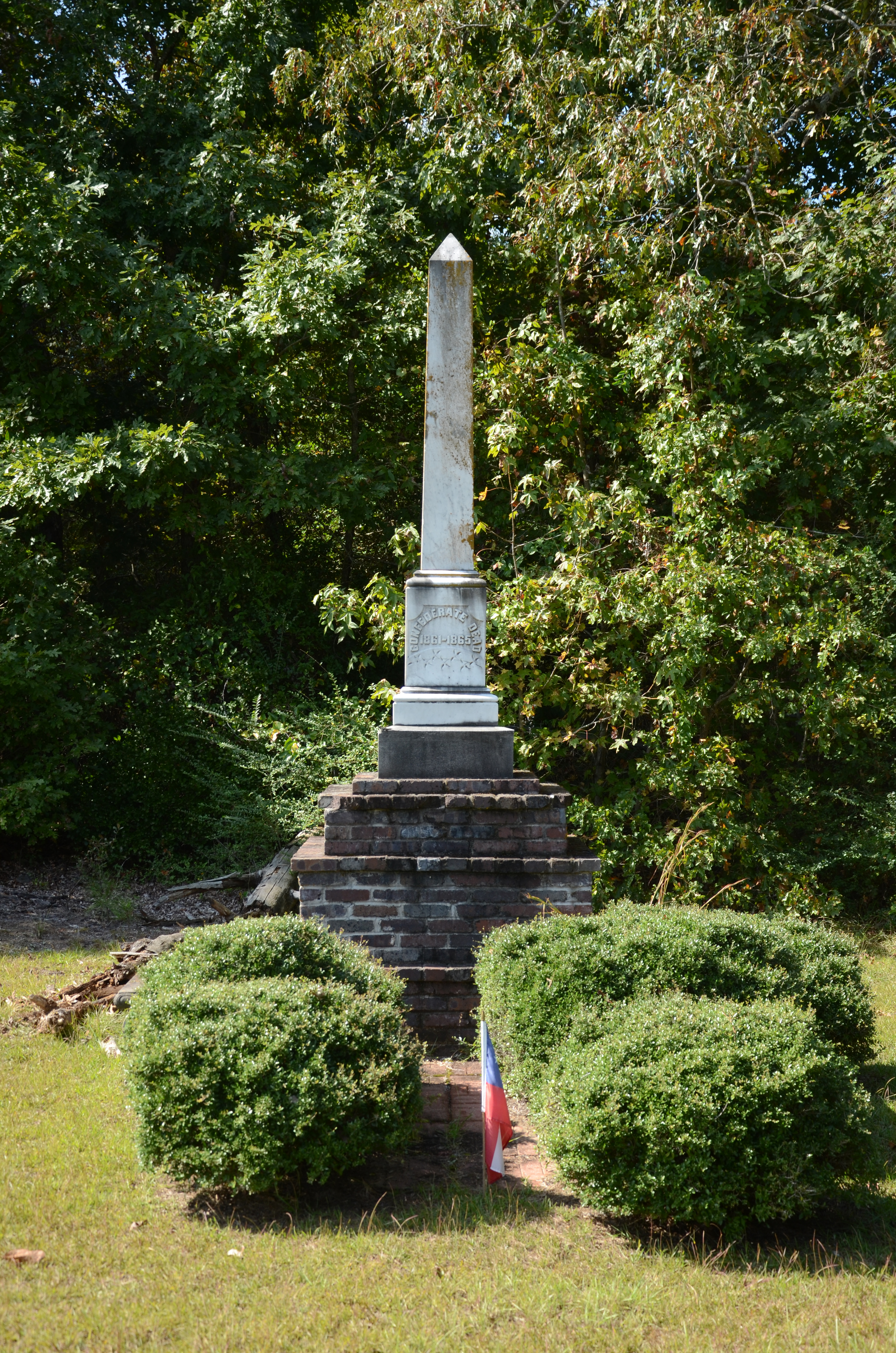

- Location within Arkansas Location within the United States
- Location: AR 4, NW of jct. with AR 32, Washington, Arkansas
- Coordinates: 33°46′30″N 93°41′28″W
- Area: less than one acre
- Built: 1888
- Built by: Rosebrough Sons Stoneworks
- Architectural style: Classical Revival
- MPS: Civil War Commemorative Sculpture MPS
- NRHP reference No.: 96001410
- Added to NRHP: December 6, 1996

The Washington Confederate Memorial is located in the Washington Presbyterian Cemetery, off United States Route 278 on the northwest side of Washington, Arkansas. The memorial is a marble obelisk, 7'8" tall, which is mounted on a three-tiered brick base that is 4'10" tall. It marks the grave site of 74 unknown Confederate Army soldiers, many of whom were killed in the 1863 Battle of Prairie D'Ane. The monument was raised by public subscription in 1888, and underwent restorative maintenance as recently as 1994.

The inscriptions read on the east, south, and north faces respectively:

CONFEDERATE DEAD
1861-65.

THEY GAVE THEIR LIVES
TO A CAUSE THAT WAS LOST
THEIR SURVIVORS
WILL NEVER SUFFER
THEIR MEMORY TO PERISH.

ERECTED BY OUR CITIZENS
TO THE MEMORY OF THE
CONFEDERATE SOLDIERS
WHO DIED AT THIS POST
DURING
OUR LATE CIVIL WAR; FAR
FROM HOME AND KINDRED
ROSEBROUGH SONS
ST. LOUIS

The monument was listed on the National Register of Historic Places in 1996.

== See also ==
- National Register of Historic Places listings in Hempstead County, Arkansas
