= Mounds Cemetery =

Historic cemetery in Arkansas, United States

- U.S. National Register of Historic Places
- Location within Arkansas Location within the United States
- Location: Hempstead County Road 13 northwest of Columbus, Arkansas
- Coordinates: 33°46′48″N 93°49′22″W
- NRHP reference No.: 13000350
- Added to NRHP: June 5, 2013

The Mounds Cemetery is a historic cemetery in rural Hempstead County, Arkansas. It is located off County Road 13, northwest of the small community of Columbus. It is significant as the site of two Caddoan mounds, and as the burying ground for some of Hempstead County's earliest white settlers. It is further significant as a stopping site along the Trail of Tears, the forced westward relocation of Native Americans in the 19th century.

The cemetery was listed on the National Register of Historic Places in 2013.

== See also ==
- National Register of Historic Places listings in Hempstead County, Arkansas
