= Dooley's Ferry Fortifications Historic District =

Historic district in Arkansas, United States

- U.S. National Register of Historic Places
- U.S. Historic district
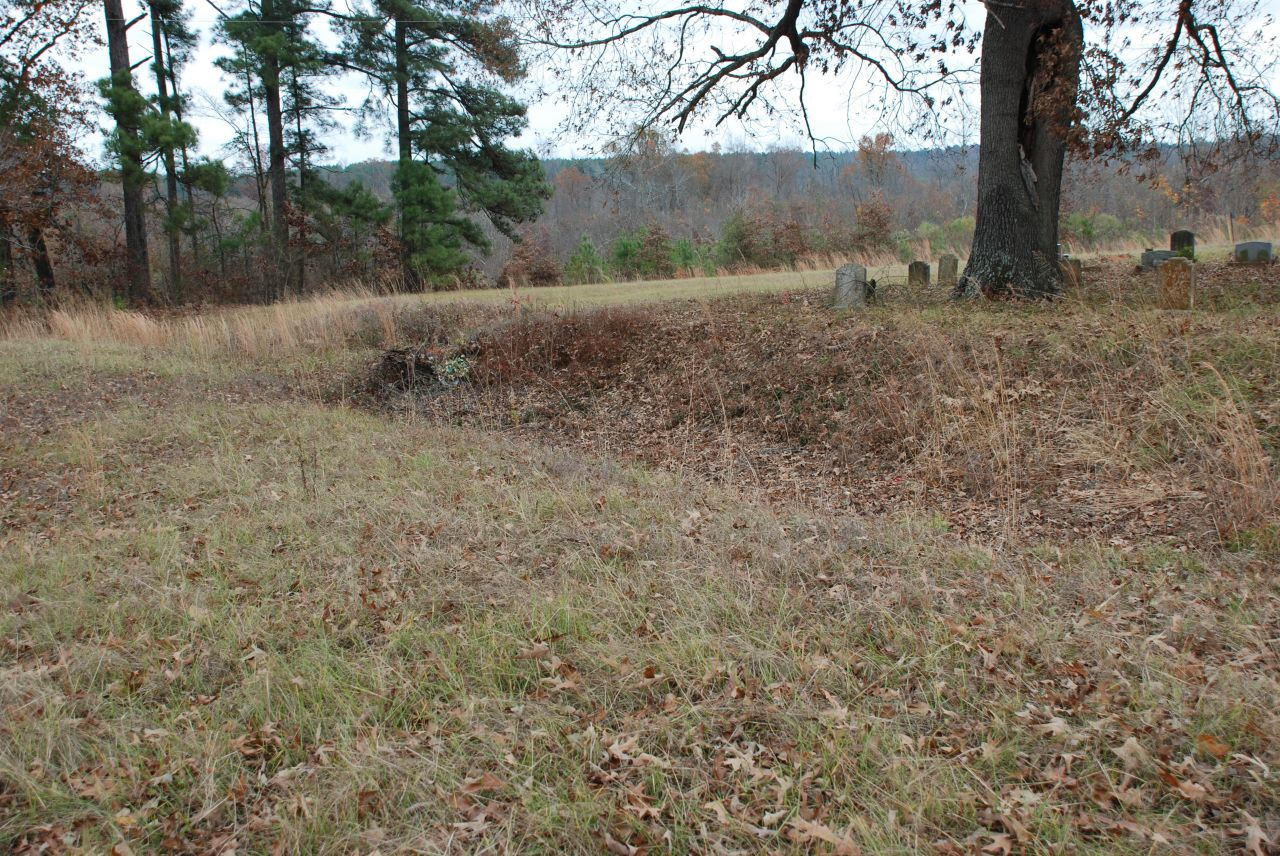
- Cemetery with earthworks

- Location within Arkansas Location within the United States
- Nearest city: Spring Hill
- Coordinates: 33°30′27″N 93°43′03″W
- Area: 24 acres (9.7 ha)
- NRHP reference No.: 04001031
- Added to NRHP: September 22, 2004

The Dooley's Ferry Fortifications Historic District protects a series of military earthworks erected in southwestern Arkansas, along the Red River in Hempstead County. They were constructed in early 1865 by Confederate troops under Alexander Hawthorn implementing orders from Major-General John B. Magruder issued the previous year. They were intended as a defense against the potential movements of Union Army forces toward Shreveport, Louisiana. They command a formerly major road intersection just east of Dooley's Ferry, one of the most important regional crossings of the Red River. As such, they were also used to control the flow of civilian traffic across the Red River and stem a flood of Confederate civilians removing from Arkansas to keep their enslaved workforce out of the hands of both U.S. Army personnel, who would emancipate them, and Confederate Army personnel, who were likely to press them into service.

After the war a cemetery for African-Americans was established adjacent to one of the gun emplacements. It is connected to the nearby Common Hill Baptist Church.

The fortifications were listed on the National Register of Historic Places in 2004.

== Gallery ==
Thomas Dooley 1837 Land Patent.

Thomas Dooley 1839 Land Patent.

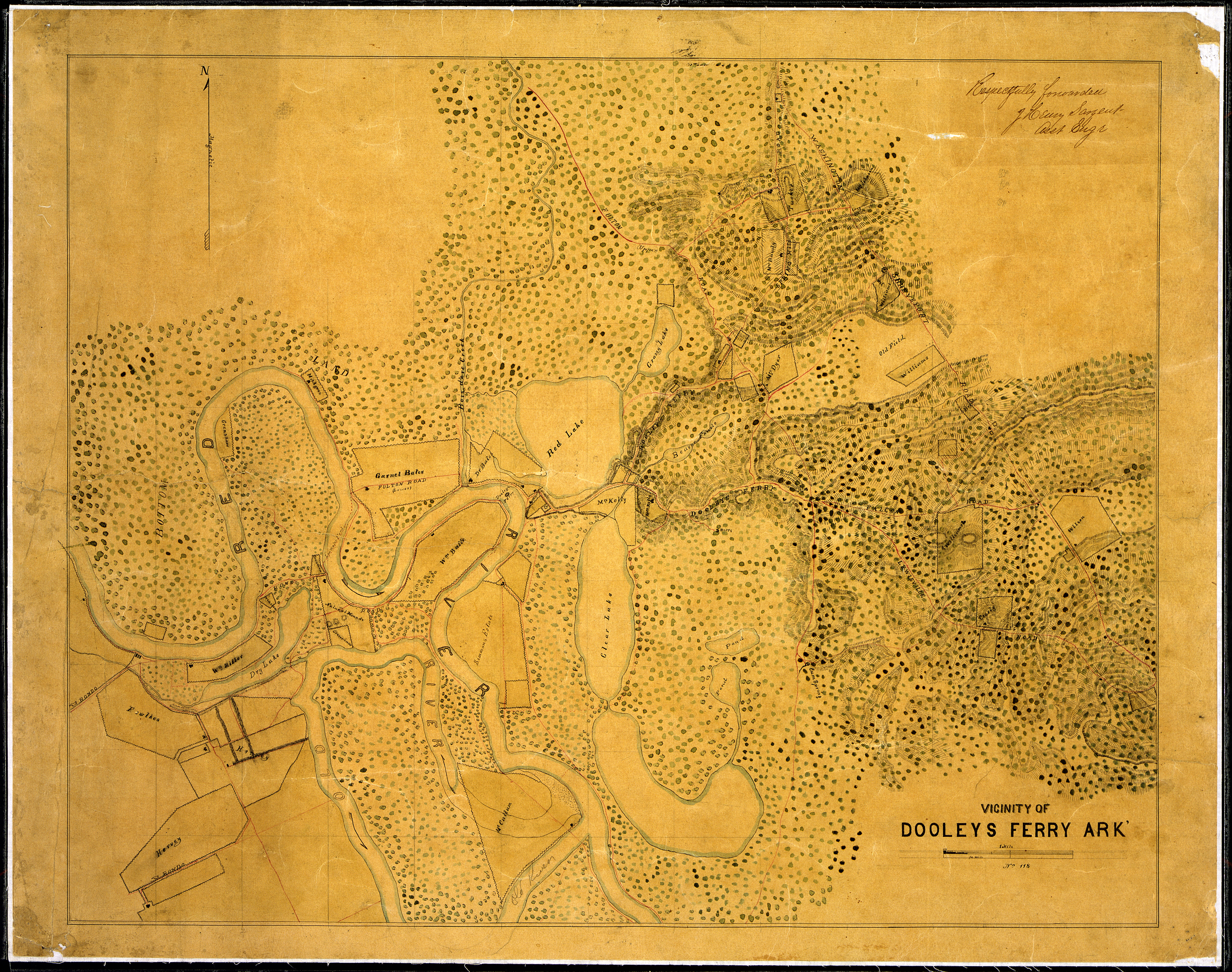
Map circa 1861–1865.

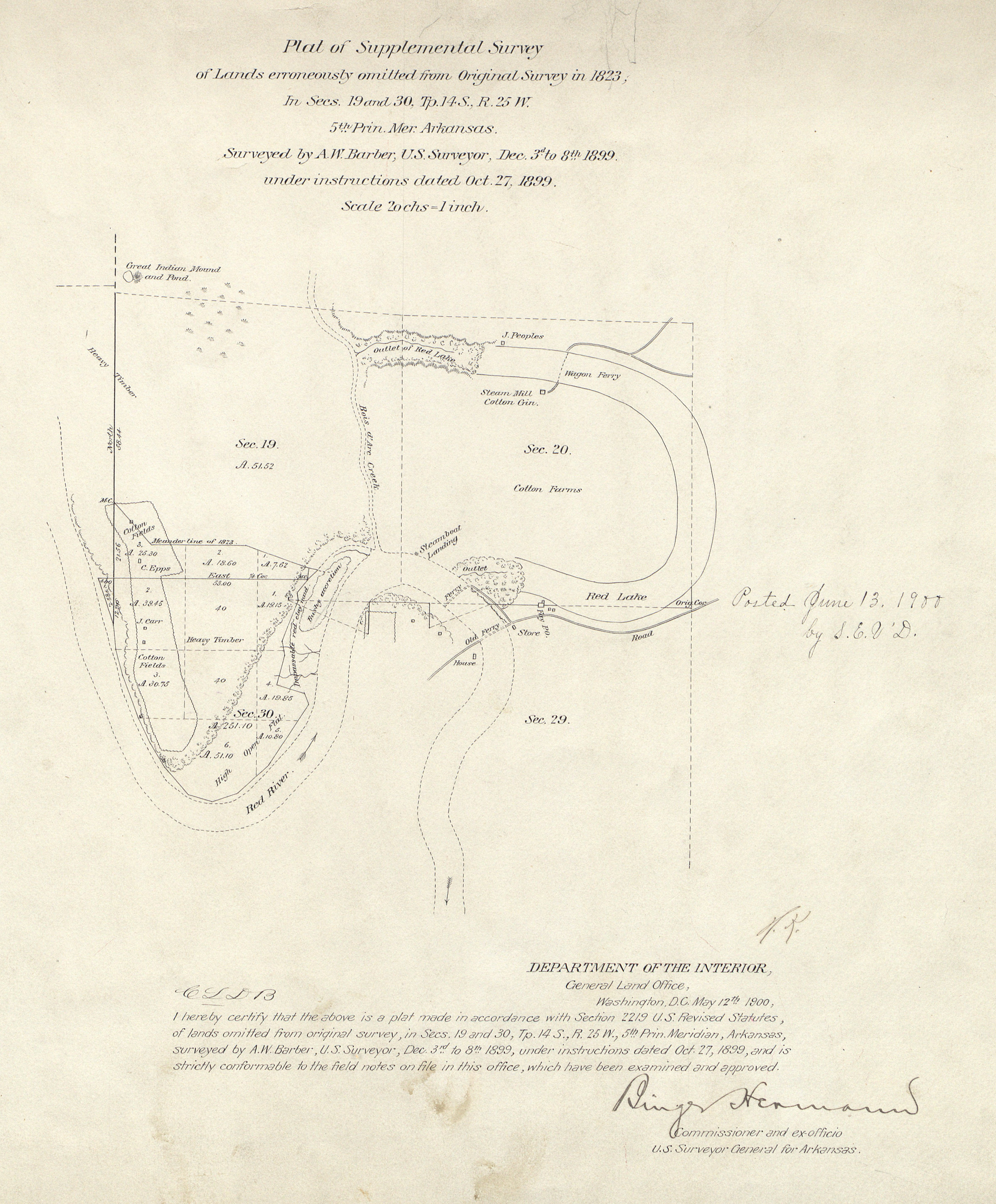
Survey map 1900.

== See also ==
- National Register of Historic Places listings in Hempstead County, Arkansas
