= Ward-Jackson House =

Historic house in Arkansas, United States

- U.S. National Register of Historic Places
- U.S. Historic district – Contributing property
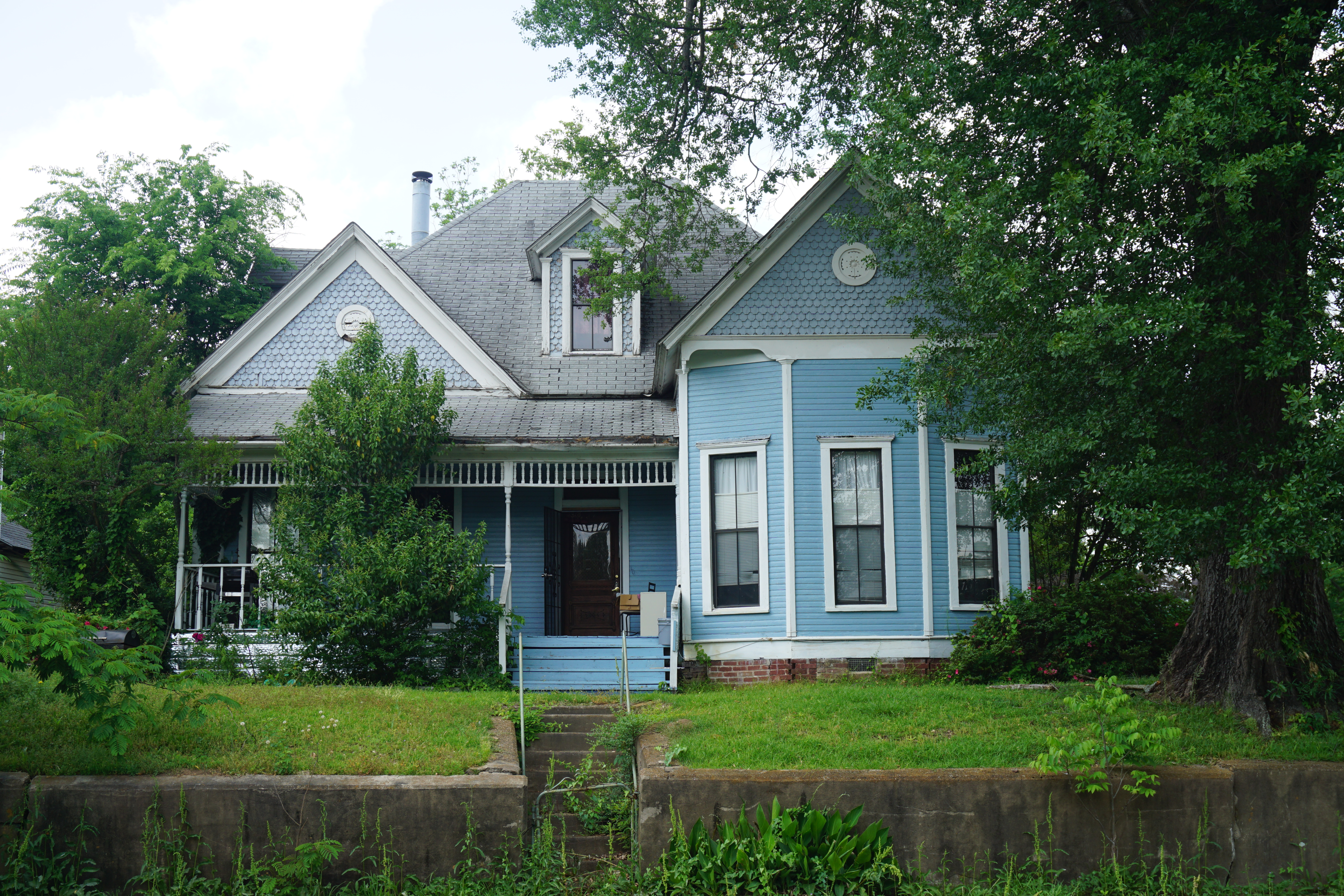

- Location within Arkansas Location within the United States
- Location: 122 N. Louisiana, Hope, Arkansas
- Coordinates: 33°40′10″N 93°35′43″W
- Area: less than one acre
- Built: 1893
- Architectural style: Late Victorian, Folk Victorian
- Part of: North Elm Street Historic District (ID95000904)
- NRHP reference No.: 89001421

Significant dates
- Added to NRHP: September 14, 1989
- Designated CP: July 28, 1995

The Ward-Jackson House is a historic house at 122 North Louisiana Street in Hope, Arkansas. The 1 1/2-story wood-frame house was built sometime in the 1890s, and is a particularly fine local example of Folk Victorian architecture. It has a busy exterior typical of Queen Anne styling, including different types of cut shingles, and has a porch with turned-spindle balustrade, and an Eastlake-style frieze. The windows are long and narrow, giving the house a somewhat Gothic appearance.

The house was listed on the National Register of Historic Places in 1989.

== See also ==
- National Register of Historic Places listings in Hempstead County, Arkansas
