= St. Mark's Episcopal Church (Hope, Arkansas) =

Historic church in Arkansas, United States

- U.S. National Register of Historic Places
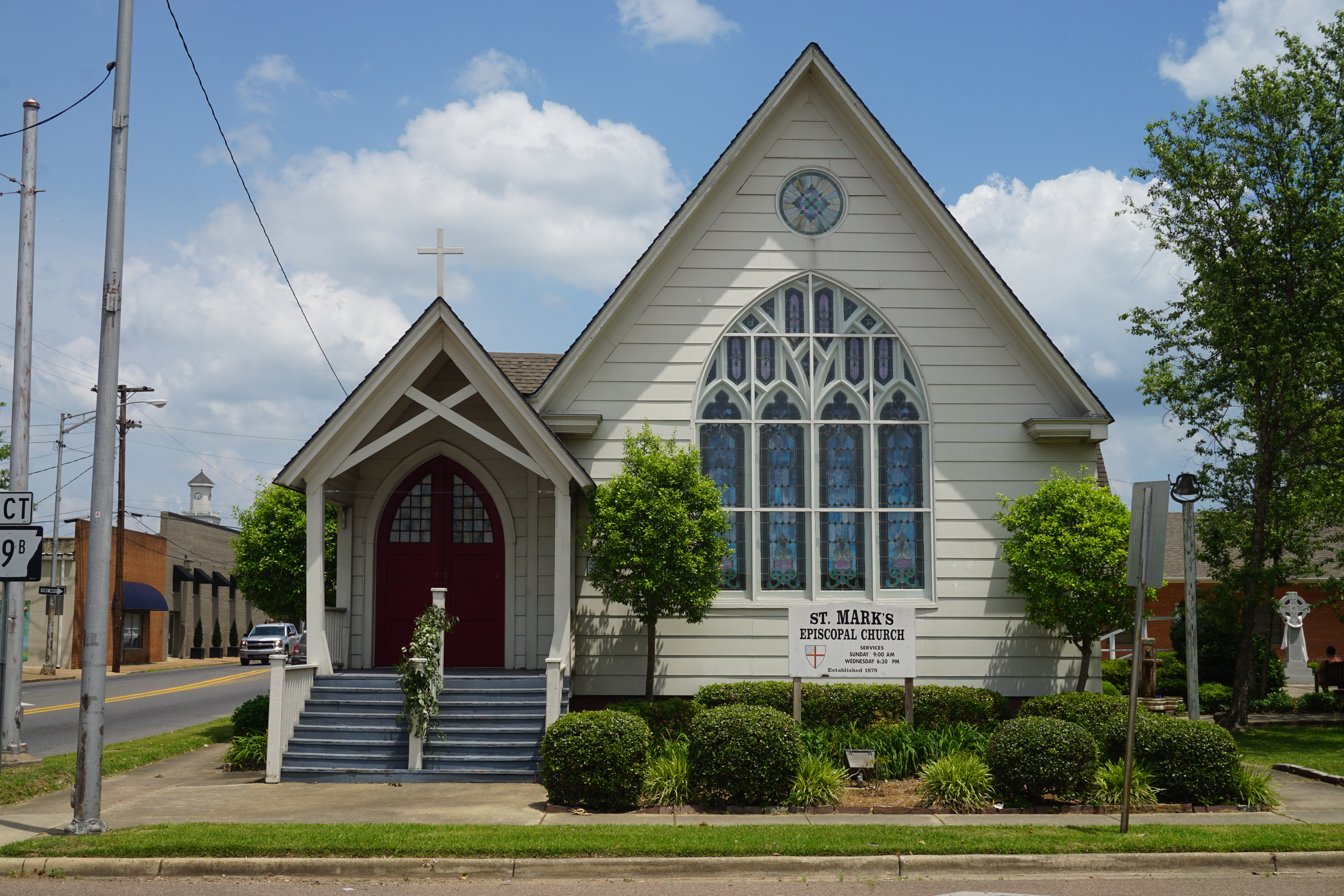

- Location within Arkansas Location within the United States
- Location: 3rd and Elm Sts., Hope, Arkansas
- Coordinates: 33°39′59″N 93°35′33″W
- Area: less than one acre
- Built: 1904
- Architectural style: Gothic
- NRHP reference No.: 76000414
- Added to NRHP: May 6, 1976

St. Mark's Episcopal Church is a parish of the Episcopal Church in Hope, Arkansas, in the Diocese of Arkansas. The congregation was founded in the late 1870s, and celebrated its first service on April 2, 1879. It was established as a parish on September 7, 1880.

It is noted for its historic parish church at 3rd and Elm Streets. The simple wood-frame Gothic Revival church was built in 1904–5, though it was not until March 28, 1909, when it was consecrated, by Bishop William Montgomery Brown. It has a modified T shape, with a gabled vestibule area on the north facade. Its stained glass windows are believed to have been designed by Louis Comfort Tiffany. The pipe organ was installed in 1915. The church was listed on the National Register of Historic Places in 1976.

== See also ==
- National Register of Historic Places listings in Hempstead County, Arkansas
