= McRae House =

Historic house in Arkansas, United States

- U.S. National Register of Historic Places
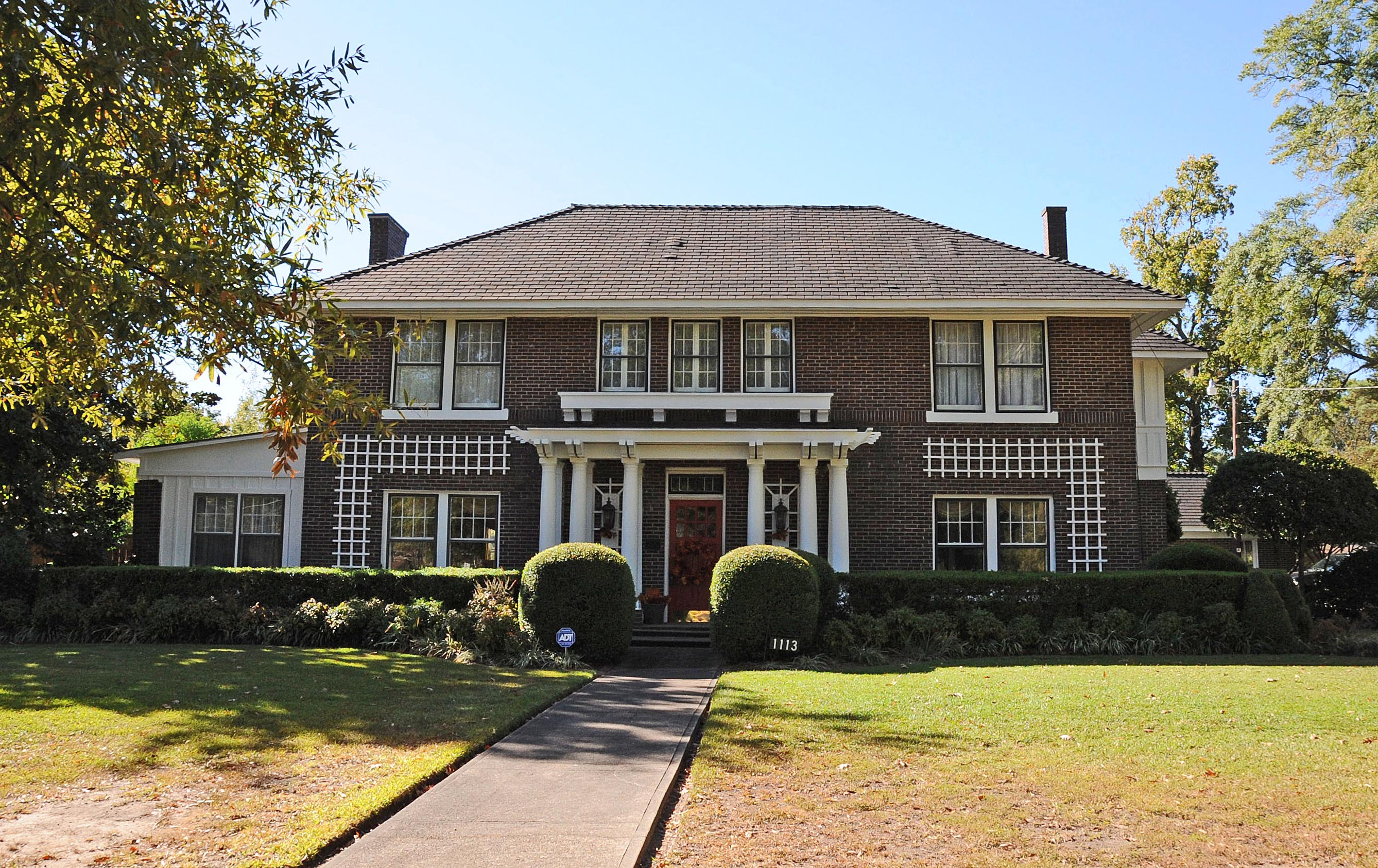

- Location within Arkansas Location within the United States
- Location: 1113 E. 3rd St., Hope, Arkansas
- Coordinates: 33°40′4″N 93°34′45″W
- Area: less than one acre
- Built: 1917
- Architect: Charles L. Thompson
- Architectural style: Prairie School
- MPS: Thompson, Charles L., Design Collection TR
- NRHP reference No.: 82000826
- Added to NRHP: December 22, 1982

The McRae House is a historic house at 1113 East 3rd Street in Hope, Arkansas. This two story brick house was designed by Charles L. Thompson and built c. 1917. It is a restrained Prairie style design, with a relatively simple main block, whose entrance is highlighted by a small porch supported by six Tuscan columns on brick plinths. The porch has curved beams, and the columns are echoed in pilasters on the facade.

The house was listed on the National Register of Historic Places in 1982.

== See also ==
- National Register of Historic Places listings in Hempstead County, Arkansas
