= Nesburt T. Ruggles House =

Historic house in Arkansas, United States

- Formerly listed on the U.S. National Register of Historic Places
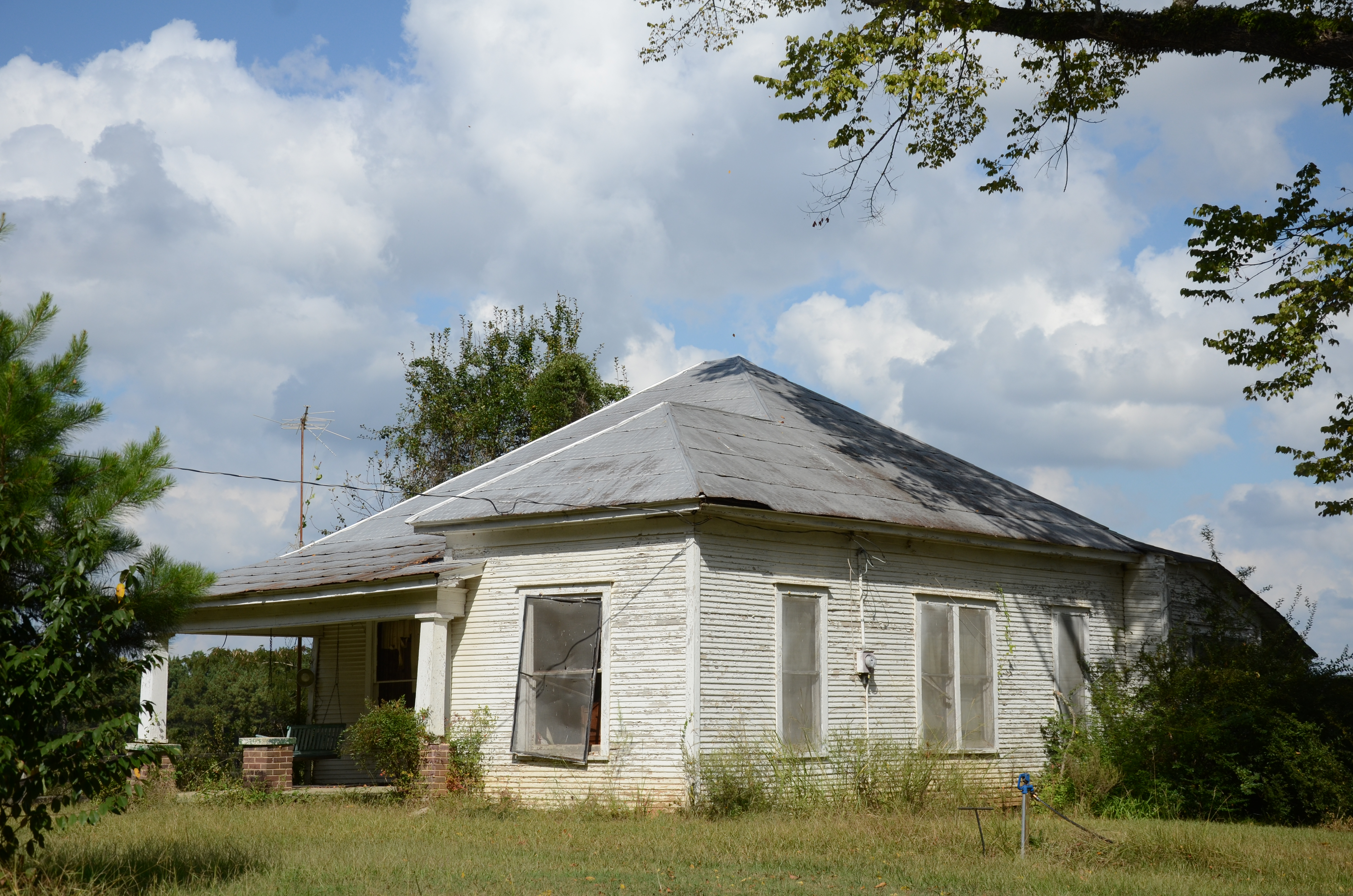

- Location within Arkansas Location within the United States
- Nearest city: Shover Springs, Arkansas
- Coordinates: 33°36′59″N 93°31′33″W
- Area: less than one acre
- Built by: Nesburt T. Ruggles
- NRHP reference No.: 94001463

Significant dates
- Added to NRHP: December 9, 1994
- Removed from NRHP: May 5, 2025

The Nesburt T. Ruggles House is a historic house in rural Hempstead County, Arkansas. It is a single story wood-frame structure, located southeast of the hamlet of Shover Springs, on the east side of Arkansas Highway 32. It is a Plain Tradition structure with an American Craftsman-style hip roof, built in 1912-14 by Nesburt Ruggles, and is the best example of its style in the area. The house is clad in novelty siding, and is roughly rectangular, with projecting hip roof sections on the sides. A shed-roof porch stands in the right-side ell created by the front facade and the right projection.

The house was listed on the National Register of Historic Places in 1994. It was delisted in 2025.

== See also ==
- National Register of Historic Places listings in Hempstead County, Arkansas
