= Hope Historic Commercial District =

Historic district in Arkansas, United States

- U.S. National Register of Historic Places
- U.S. Historic district
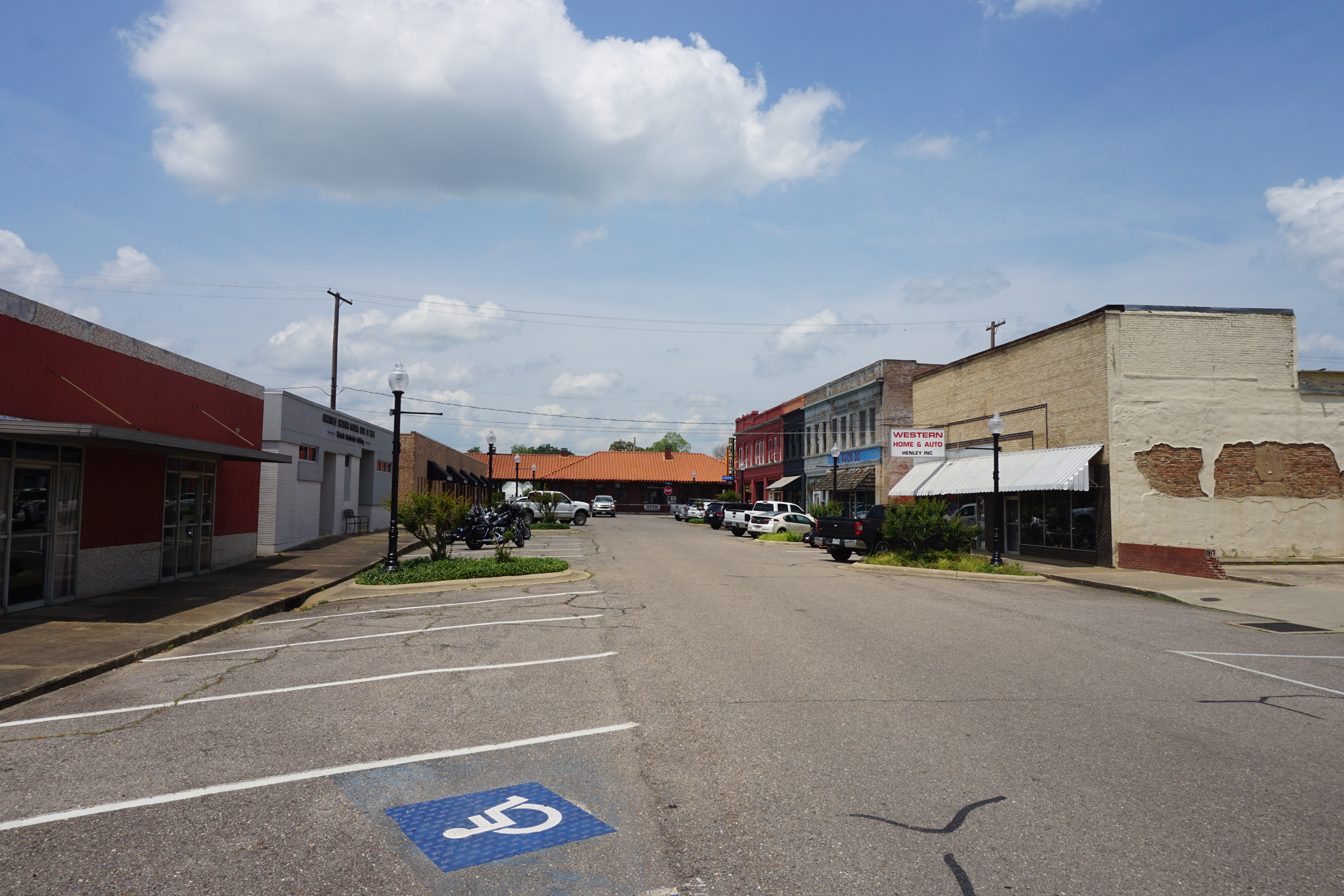

- Location within Arkansas Location within the United States
- Location: Roughly bounded by the Union Pacific RR tracks, Louisiana St., 3rd St. and Walnut St., Hope, Arkansas
- Area: 18 acres (7.3 ha)
- Built: 1880
- Architect: James Knox Taylor (U.S. Post Office); Witt, Siebert & Co. (National Building)
- Architectural style: Renaissance, Italianate, Classical Revival
- NRHP reference No.: 95000905
- Added to NRHP: July 28, 1995

The Hope Historic Commercial District encompasses a two-block area of downtown Hope, Arkansas. The 18-acre (7.3 ha) district is bounded on the north by the railroad tracks, on the east by Walnut Street, the west by Elm Street, and the south by 3rd Street. The area consists for the most part of commercial brick buildings one or two stories in height, with relatively plain styling. Most of these were built between 1880 and 1945, the major period of Hope's development. The most architecturally significant buildings in the district are the Brundidge Building, an 1893 Romanesque Revival structure, and the Renaissance Revival former post office building (built in 1911 and now owned by the city).

The district was listed on the National Register of Historic Places in 1995. In addition to the Brundidge Building, the main railroad station is also separately listed on the National Register.

== See also ==
- National Register of Historic Places in Hempstead County, Arkansas
