= North Washington Street Historic District (Hope, Arkansas) =

Historic district in Arkansas, United States

- U.S. National Register of Historic Places
- U.S. Historic district
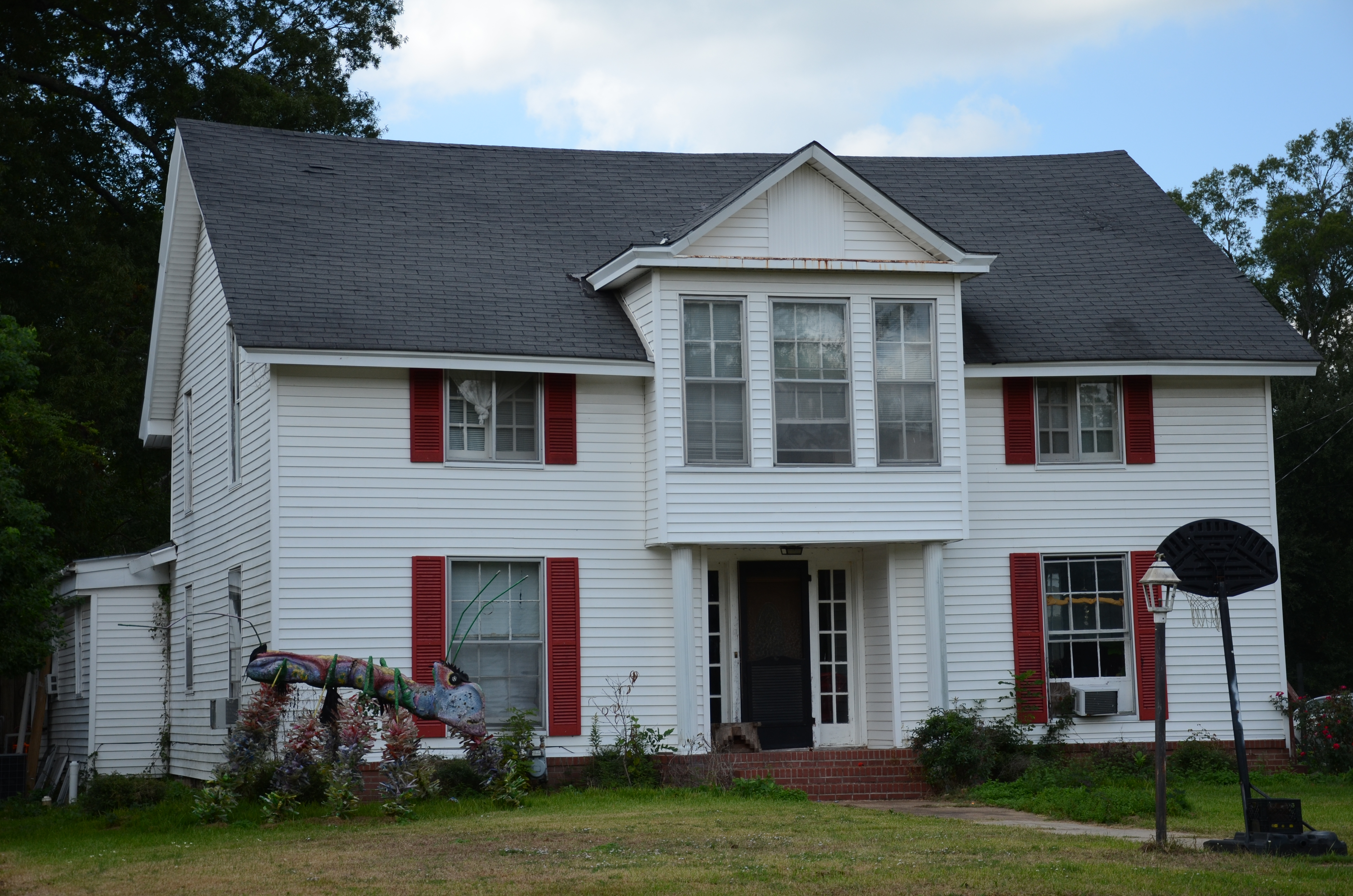

- Location within Arkansas Location within the United States
- Location: Along N. Washington St., between B and E Sts., E side, Hope, Arkansas
- Coordinates: 33.67016°N 93.59987°W
- Area: 5 acres (2.0 ha)
- Built: 1900
- Architectural style: Colonial Revival, Prairie School, Bungalow/craftsman
- NRHP reference No.: 95000903
- Added to NRHP: July 28, 1995

The North Washington Street Historic District is a residential historic district in Hope, Arkansas. It consists of a group of six houses along the west side of North Washington Street, between B and E Streets, representing the best cluster of well-preserved houses from Hope's second period of residential expansion, between 1900 and 1945. The six houses (220, 316, 320, 402, and 416 North Washington and 704 Pond Street) are architecturally diverse: two of them are Folk Victorian wood-frame houses, two are Prairie style brick buildings, and the other two are Colonial and Craftsman in style. These house are set on larger house lots than those found in the North Elm Street Historic District, part of Hope's original platting which features some older houses and generally smaller lot sizes.

The district was listed on the National Register of Historic Places in 1995.

== See also ==
- National Register of Historic Places listings in Hempstead County, Arkansas
