= Oakhaven =

Oakhaven may refer to:

- Oakhaven, Arkansas
- Oakhaven, Massachusetts. a fictional suburb of Salem in Scooby-Doo! and the Witch's Ghost
- Oakhaven, New York, a community built in East Islip, New York
