= E.S. Greening House =

Historic house in Arkansas, United States

- E. S. Greening House
- U.S. National Register of Historic Places
- Location within Arkansas Location within the United States
- Location: 707 E. Division St., Hope, Arkansas
- Coordinates: 33°40′16″N 93°34′52″W
- Area: less than one acre
- Built: 1903
- Built by: Tom Crosnoe
- Architectural style: Queen Anne
- NRHP reference No.: 87001147
- Added to NRHP: July 9, 1987

The E. S. Greening House was a historic house at 707 East Division Street in Hope, Arkansas. It was a two-story wood-frame structure built in 1903, with a projecting bay rising a full two stories and a shed-roof porch wrapping around two sides of the house. The house was notable primarily for its high quality and elaborate interior woodwork, even though its exterior was not a particularly elaborate version of Queen Anne styling.

The house was listed on the National Register of Historic Places in 1987. As of 2014, it has apparently been demolished, and is (according to the Arkansas Preservation Office) in the process of being delisted from the National Register.

== See also ==
- National Register of Historic Places listings in Hempstead County, Arkansas
