= Grandison D. Royston House =

Historic house in Arkansas, United States

- U.S. National Register of Historic Places
- U.S. Historic district – Contributing property
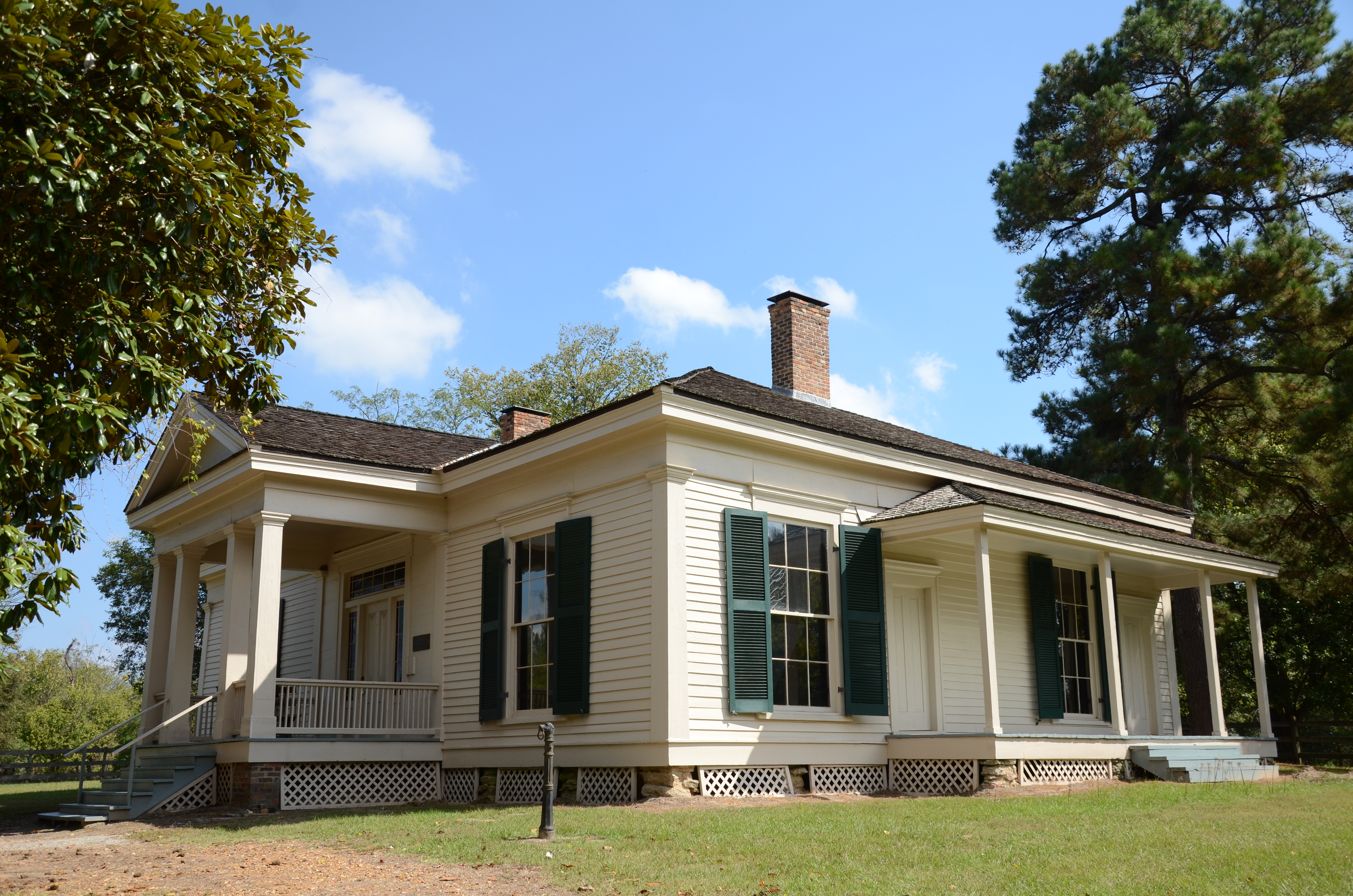

- Location within Arkansas Location within the United States
- Location: SW of Columbus St., Washington, Arkansas
- Coordinates: 33°46′19.5″N 93°40′55″W
- Area: less than one acre
- Built: 1833
- Architectural style: Greek Revival
- Part of: Washington Historic District (ID72000204)
- NRHP reference No.: 71000124

Significant dates
- Added to NRHP: June 21, 1971
- Designated CP: June 20, 1972

The Grandison D. Royston House is a historic house at Columbus and Water Streets in Historic Washington State Park, Washington, Arkansas. It is a single-story wood-frame structure, about 55 feet (17 m) wide and 51 feet (16 m) deep, with a hip roof pierced by two chimneys with corbelled tops. The main entry is centered under a projecting gable-roof porch, and is framed by sidelights and transom windows. The porch is supported at the front by pairs of square columns with moulded capitals and a square plinth. At the back of the house is a shed-roof addition which housed the kitchen. The interior of the main block is divided into four rooms, two on either side of a large central hall.

The house was built c. 1833 by Grandison Delaney Royston, then at the start of a long and distinguished career in Arkansas politics, serving in the state legislature, as United States District Attorney, and as a state militia general during the American Civil War.

The house was listed on the National Register of Historic Places in 1972. It is one of the finest early examples of the Greek Revival in the state.

== See also ==
- National Register of Historic Places listings in Hempstead County, Arkansas
