= Brundidge Building =

- U.S. National Register of Historic Places
- U.S. Historic district – Contributing property
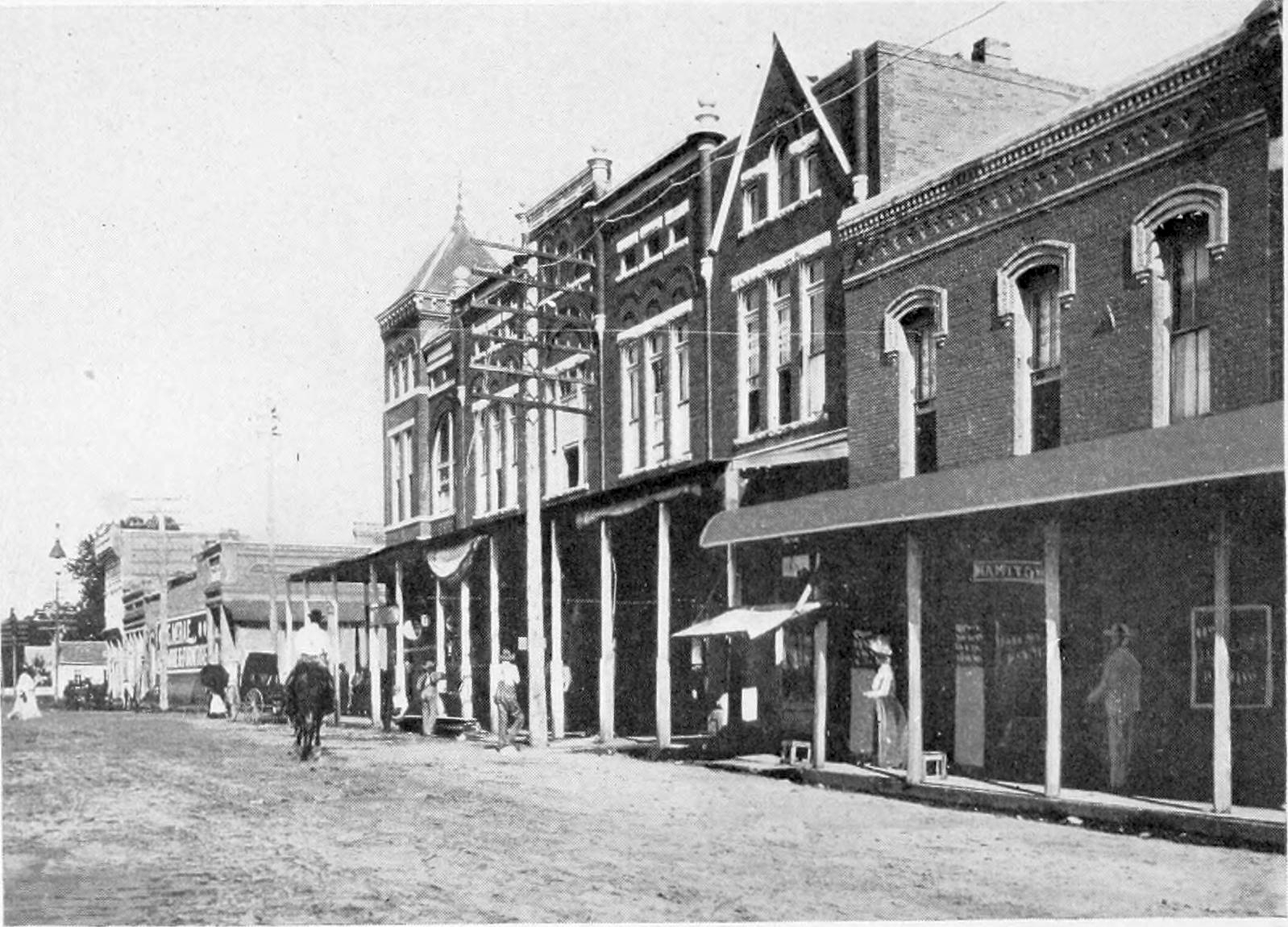
- The Brundidge Building is centered in the c. 1904 photograph

- Location within Arkansas Location within the United States
- Location: W. Second St., Hope, Arkansas
- Coordinates: 33°40′3″N 93°35′32″W
- Area: less than one acre
- Built: 1893
- Architectural style: Romanesque
- Part of: Hope Historic Commercial District (ID95000905)
- NRHP reference No.: 90000431

Significant dates
- Added to NRHP: March 27, 1990
- Designated CP: July 28, 1995

The Brundidge Building is a historic commercial building on West Second Street in the commercial heart of Hope, Arkansas. The 2 1/2-story brick building was erected in 1893 by J. P. Brundidge and is the city's best example of Romanesque Revival architecture. Its main facade is divided into four bays. The rightmost bay projects slightly and is decorated at its corners with small turrets which flank a gable front. This gable has a bank of windows in it consisting of paired sash windows flanking a segmented-arch window.

The building was listed on the National Register of Historic Places in 1990.

== See also ==
- National Register of Historic Places listings in Hempstead County, Arkansas
