= North Elm Street Historic District =

Historic district in Arkansas, United States

- U.S. National Register of Historic Places
- U.S. Historic district
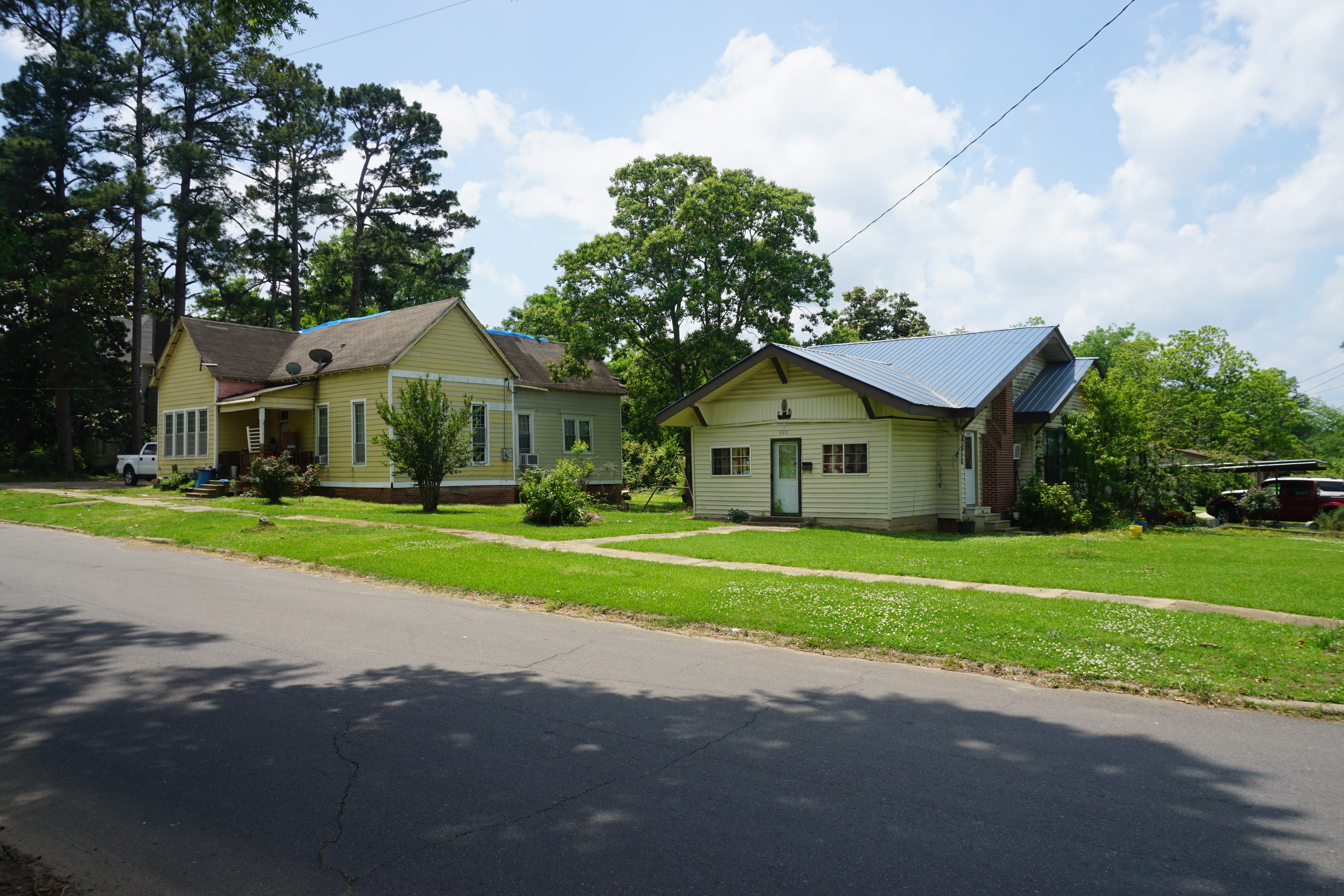
- A house on Elm Street

- Location within Arkansas Location within the United States
- Location: Roughly bounded by the Union Pacific RR tracks, Hervey St., G Ave. and Hazel St., Hope, Arkansas
- Coordinates: 33.67118°N 93.59365°W
- Area: 85 acres (34 ha)
- Built: 1890
- Architectural style: Prairie School, Colonial Revival, Queen Anne
- NRHP reference No.: 95000904
- Added to NRHP: July 28, 1995

The North Elm Street Historic District is a predominantly residential historic district in Hope, Arkansas. The district is rectangular in shape, roughly bounded on the north by Avenue G, on the west by Hervey Street, on the east by Hazel Street, and on the south by the railroad tracks. Most of the residential structures in this area were built between 1890 and 1945, and represent the city's greatest concentration of homes built during its boom years. The only major institutional building in the district is Hope City Hall, a Classical Revival structure.

The district was listed on the National Register of Historic Places in 1995. Included within the district are three separately-listed properties: the Bill Clinton Birthplace, the Ward-Jackson House, and the Foster House.

== See also ==
- National Register of Historic Places listings in Hempstead County, Arkansas
