= Ozan, Arkansas =

- Town
- Location of Ozan in Hempstead County, Arkansas.
- Coordinates: 33°50′53″N 93°43′13″W
- Country: United States
- State: Arkansas
- County: Hempstead

Area
  - Total: 0.33 sq mi (0.85 km^{2})
  - Land: 0.33 sq mi (0.85 km^{2})
  - Water: 0 sq mi (0.00 km^{2})
- Elevation: 390 ft (120 m)

Population (2020)
  - Total: 50
  - Estimate (2025): 49 ▼
  - Density: 152.7/sq mi (58.97/km^{2})
- Time zone: UTC-6 (Central (CST))
  - Summer (DST): UTC-5 (CDT)
- ZIP code: 71855
- Area code: 870
- FIPS code: 05-52940
- GNIS feature ID: 2407061

Ozan is a town in Hempstead County, Arkansas, United States. As of the 2020 census, Ozan had a population of 50. It is part of the Hope, Arkansas micropolitan area.

== Geography ==
According to the United States Census Bureau, the city has a total area of 0.3 square miles (0.78 km^{2}), all land.

== Demographics ==
Historical population
Census	Pop.	Note	%±
1890	91		—
1900	118		29.7%
1910	129		9.3%
1920	155		20.2%
1930	124		−20.0%
1940	133		7.3%
1950	124		−6.8%
1960	95		−23.4%
1970	134		41.1%
1980	111		−17.2%
1990	69		−37.8%
2000	81		17.4%
2010	85		4.9%
2020	50		−41.2%
2025 (est.)	49	▼	−2.0%
U.S. Decennial Census

As of the census of 2000, there were 81 people, 33 households, and 26 families residing in the city. The population density was 254.4 inhabitants per square mile (98.2/km^{2}). There were 41 housing units at an average density of 128.8 per square mile (49.7/km^{2}). The racial makeup of the city was 53.09% White, 41.98% Black or African American, 4.94% from other races. 4.94% of the population were Hispanic or Latino of any race.

There were 33 households, out of which 18.2% had children under the age of 18 living with them, 63.6% were married couples living together, 15.2% had a female householder with no husband present, and 21.2% were non-families. 21.2% of all households were made up of individuals, and none had someone living alone who was 65 years of age or older. The average household size was 2.45 and the average family size was 2.77.

In the city the population was spread out, with 14.8% under the age of 18, 12.3% from 18 to 24, 27.2% from 25 to 44, 30.9% from 45 to 64, and 14.8% who were 65 years of age or older. The median age was 42 years. For every 100 females, there were 118.9 males. For every 100 females age 18 and over, there were 109.1 males.

The median income for a household in the city was $33,333, and the median income for a family was $34,167. Males had an income of $17,500 versus $16,528 for females. The per capita income for the city was $12,977. There were 6.3% of families and 3.5% of the population living below the poverty line, including none under 18 and 14.3% of those over 64.
