= Hope Municipal Airport =

Airport in Hope, Arkansas

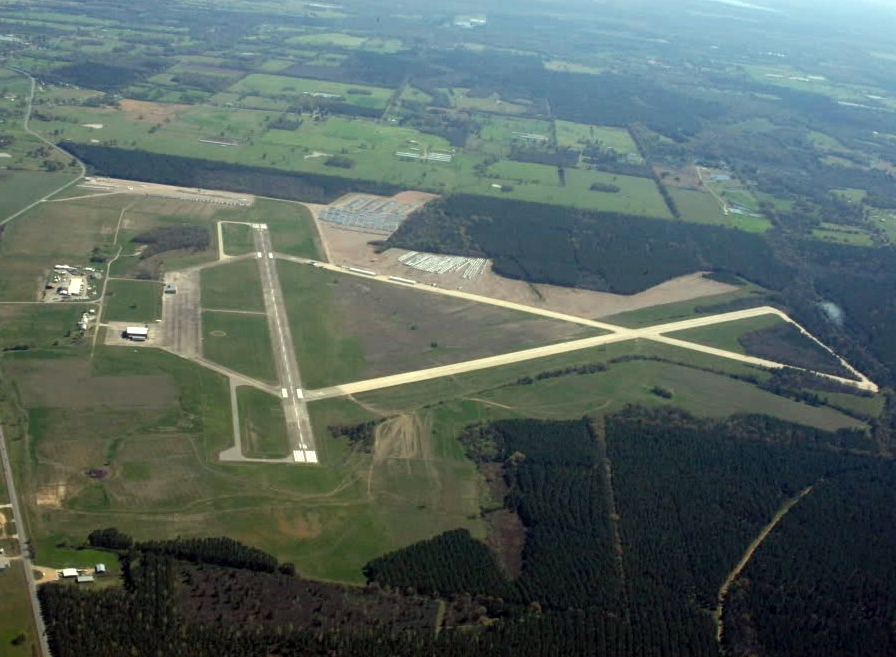
- IATA: none; ICAO: none; FAA LID: M18

Summary
- Airport type: Public
- Owner: City of Hope
- Serves: Hope, Arkansas
- Location: Hempstead County
- Elevation AMSL: 359 ft (109 m)
- Coordinates: 33°43′12″N 093°39′32″W

Map
- Location of airport in Arkansas M18 (the United States)

Runways
Direction	Length		Surface
Direction	ft	m	Surface
4/22	5,560	1,695	Concrete
16/34	5,501	1,677	Concrete

Statistics (2010)
- Aircraft operations: 8,000
- Based aircraft: 26
- Source: Federal Aviation Administration

Hope Municipal Airport (FAA LID: M18) is a city-owned public-use airport located four nautical miles (5 mi, 7 km) northwest of the central business district of Hope, a city in Hempstead County, Arkansas, United States. It is included in the National Plan of Integrated Airport Systems for 2015–2019, which categorized it as a general aviation airport.

In the aftermath of August 2005 Hurricane Katrina, the Federal Emergency Management Agency signed a $25,000-per-month lease with the city to use 453 acres (1.83 km^{2}) at the Hope Municipal Airport as a staging area for trailers. About 12,000 travel trailers and 8,300 mobile homes sat at the airport. Many of them were never used by the victims of Hurricane Katrina or other emergency.

== History ==
=== World War II ===
The Southwestern Proving Ground (SWPG) was utilized during World War II as an airfield for bombers and a testing ground for artillery shells and air bombs. The proving ground was in operation from 1941 to 1945 and was a major employer of Hempstead, Howard, Nevada, Clark and Lafayette counties.

The construction of the Southwestern Proving Ground was part of the U.S. Government's National Defense Program which provided factories for the manufacture of munitions, airplanes and tanks in preparation for an eventual war. The news of construction on a proving ground in Hope became official in June 1941. The Real Estate Department of the War Department was in charge of acquiring land by filing condemnation proceedings against the tract and then taking possession of those sections they required to begin immediate work. After the initial evacuation order the War Department decided they needed more room for an airport so they added more acres. In the end 404 families were relocated by a deadline of July 24. Callahan Construction Company was awarded the job of erecting the proving ground by the War Department and the hiring of 4,000 construction workers began July 15. Senator Spencer and the project director, W.K. Mellyor, agreed upon a guarantee of preferential treatment of local citizens in considerations for jobs.

When the airport was completed it had the third longest runway in the United States. Opening day festivities were postponed because of the bombing of Pearl Harbor on December 7, 1941. The Army Air Force Proving Ground Command 616th Army Air Corps Detachment used the facility primarily to test ammunition during World War II.

Testing began in January 1942 and Hempstead County residents were finally allowed within the gates of the proving ground in April. Troops explored the capabilities of LaBolenge chronographs and solenoid chronographs (two different instruments that record time intervals) for accuracy and reliability. 105-mm shells that had fired prematurely in battle were determined by research at SWPG to have faulty rotating bands, thus saving the lives of American troops. B-25s were sent from the airport in Hope to the Gulf of Mexico to observe the testing of bombs for tumbling and proper ballistics after being fired. After World War II the city of Hope received the Southwestern Proving Ground Airport, which became Hope Municipal Airport in 1947.

=== Historic District ===
The Southwestern Proving Ground Airport Historic District, listed on the National Register of Historic Places in 2008, is composed of six buildings and five structures, which include the hangar, night landing plant, heating plant, storage building, garage, bomb assembly building, high explosives magazine and concrete runways and hangar apron. The magazine and bomb assembly building are located on adjacent land under private ownership. The remaining five buildings are located on 750 acres (3.0 km^{2}) owned by Hope Municipal Airport.

The hangar is located to the west of U.S. Highway 278 and is surrounded by a concrete apron on all sides. The building is constructed of brick in a restrained Art Deco style on a continuous concrete foundation with a barrel vaulted roof and four corner towers. The interior of the hangar covers a total of 25,000 square feet (2,300 m^{2}).

The night landing plant is adjacent to the hangar and is about 40 feet (12 m) from its southeastern corner. The plant is a very simple one-story rectangular brick edifice with a flat roof.

The steam heating plant is located east of the hangar, across Airport Road. During the operation of SWPG this building generated steam heat to warm the buildings in the entire complex. The plant currently houses the Paul W. Klipsch Education Center, the educational component of the Klipsch Heritage Museum Association, Inc.

The storage building to the south of the steam heating plant is a rectangular vernacular building with a gable roof.

The bomb assembly building is southwest of the hangar and is located on private property within a chain link fence. Bombs were assembled in this building and hauled by truck to Lake Charles, Louisiana, for testing. The high-explosives building is located on private property and is south of the bomb assembly building, outside of the fenced-in area.

== Facilities and aircraft ==
Hope Municipal Airport covers an area of 1,575 acres (637 ha) at an elevation of 359 feet (109 m) above mean sea level. It has two runways with concrete surfaces: 4/22 is 5,560 by 150 feet (1,695 x 46 m) and 16/34 is 5,501 by 150 feet (1,677 x 46 m).

For the 12-month period ending December 31, 2010, the airport had 8,000 aircraft operations, an average of 21 per day: 94% general aviation and 6% military. At that time there were 26 aircraft based at this airport: 88.5% single-engine, and 11.5% multi-engine.

== See also ==
- Arkansas World War II Army Airfields
- List of airports in Arkansas
- National Register of Historic Places listings in Hempstead County, Arkansas
