= Washington, Arkansas =

- City
- City of Washington
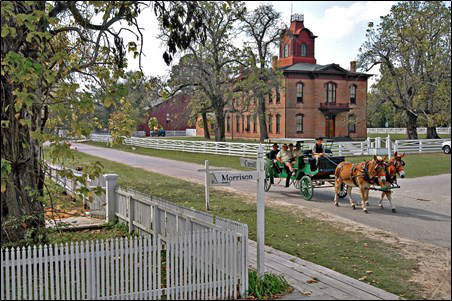
- Historic Washington State Park

- Location of Washington in Hempstead County, Arkansas.

- Location of Washington in the U.S.
- Coordinates: 33°46′22″N 93°41′00″W
- Country: United States
- State: Arkansas
- County: Hempstead
- Settled: 1824
- Incorporated: 1880
- Named for: George Washington

Government
  - Type: Mayor–Council
  - Council: Washington City Council

Area
  - Total: 1.01 sq mi (2.61 km^{2})
  - Land: 1.01 sq mi (2.61 km^{2})
  - Water: 0 sq mi (0.00 km^{2})
- Elevation: 436 ft (133 m)

Population (2020)
  - Total: 94
  - Estimate (2025): 92 ▼
  - Density: 93.3/sq mi (36.03/km^{2})
- Demonym: Washingtonian
- Time zone: UTC−6 (CST)
  - Summer (DST): UTC−5 (CDT)
- ZIP code: 71862
- Area code: 870
- FIPS code: 05-73370
- GNIS feature ID: 2405680

Washington is a city in Ozan Township, Hempstead County, Arkansas, United States. As of the 2020 census, Washington had a population of 94. It is part of the Hope Micropolitan Statistical Area. The city is home to Historic Washington State Park.

== History ==
From its establishment in 1824, Washington was an important stop on the rugged Southwest Trail for pioneers traveling to Texas. That same year, it was established as the "seat of justice" for that area, and in 1825 the Hempstead County Court of Common Pleas was established, located in a building constructed next door to a tavern owned by early resident Elijah Stuart. Between 1832 and 1839, thousands of Choctaw Native Americans passed through Washington on their way to Indian Territory. Frontiersmen and national heroes James Bowie, Sam Houston and Davy Crockett all traveled through Washington en route to the Alamo. Houston is believed to have planned parts of the revolt strategy in a tavern in Washington during 1834. James Black, a Washington blacksmith, is credited with creating a knife which became known as the iconic Bowie knife, carried by James Bowie.

During the War with Mexico, beginning in 1846, Washington became a rally point for volunteer troops on their way to serve with the U.S. Army. Later, the town became a major service center for area planters, merchants and professionals. Following the capture of Little Rock by the Union Army in 1863, the pro-Confederate States of America state government moved the state government offices to Hot Springs for a short time, then ultimately based the state government out of Washington, making it the (rebel) state capital until 1865. Following the construction of the Cairo and Fulton railroad eight miles to the south of Washington, which connected much of the state with Little Rock, the town began a slow decline. Now located on the area's primary travel route, Hope took on Washington's formerly important role.

== Geography ==
Washington is in north-central Hempstead County, 10 miles (16 km) northwest of Hope, the county seat. U.S. Route 278 passes through Washington as Columbus Street, leading southeast to Hope and northwest 19 miles (31 km) to Nashville. Arkansas Highway 195 has its northern terminus in Washington and leads southwest 14 miles (23 km) to Fulton on the Red River.

According to the United States Census Bureau, Washington has a total area of 1.0 square mile (2.6 km^{2}), all land. The climate in this area is characterized by hot, humid summers and generally mild to cool winters. According to the Köppen Climate Classification system, Washington has a humid subtropical climate, abbreviated "Cfa" on climate maps.

== Demographics ==
Historical population
| Census | Pop. | Note | %± |
|---|---|---|---|
| 1880 | 730 | | — |
| 1890 | 519 | | −28.9% |
| 1900 | 374 | | −27.9% |
| 1910 | 399 | | 6.7% |
| 1920 | 556 | | 39.3% |
| 1930 | 457 | | −17.8% |
| 1940 | 432 | | −5.5% |
| 1950 | 344 | | −20.4% |
| 1960 | 321 | | −6.7% |
| 1970 | 290 | | −9.7% |
| 1980 | 265 | | −8.6% |
| 1990 | 148 | | −44.2% |
| 2000 | 148 | | 0.0% |
| 2010 | 180 | | 21.6% |
| 2020 | 94 | | −47.8% |
| 2025 (est.) | 92 | ▼ | −2.1% |
U.S. Decennial Census

=== 2020 census ===
Washington, Arkansas – Racial and ethnic composition The U.S. census treats Hispanic/Latino as an ethnic category. This table excludes Latinos from the racial categories and assigns them to a separate category. Hispanics/Latinos may be of any race.
| Race / Ethnicity (NH = Non-Hispanic) | Pop 2000 | Pop 2010 | Pop 2020 | % 2000 | % 2010 | % 2020 |
|---|---|---|---|---|---|---|
| White alone (NH) | 57 | 94 | 46 | 38.51% | 52.22% | 48.94% |
| Black or African American alone (NH) | 91 | 78 | 39 | 61.49% | 43.33% | 41.49% |
| Native American or Alaska Native alone (NH) | 0 | 0 | 0 | 0.00% | 0.00% | 0.00% |
| Asian alone (NH) | 0 | 1 | 0 | 0.00% | 0.56% | 0.00% |
| Native Hawaiian or Pacific Islander alone (NH) | 0 | 0 | 0 | 0.00% | 0.00% | 0.00% |
| Other race alone (NH) | 0 | 0 | 1 | 0.00% | 0.00% | 1.06% |
| Mixed race or Multiracial (NH) | 0 | 3 | 4 | 0.00% | 1.67% | 4.26% |
| Hispanic or Latino (any race) | 0 | 4 | 4 | 0.00% | 2.22% | 4.26% |
| Total | 148 | 180 | 94 | 100.00% | 100.00% | 100.00% |

As of the census of 2000, there were 148 people, 78 households, and 40 families residing in the city. The population density was 147.6 inhabitants per square mile (57.0/km^{2}). There were 93 housing units at an average density of 92.7 per square mile (35.8/km^{2}). The racial makeup of the city was 38.51% White and 61.49% Black or African American.

There were 78 households, out of which 14.1% had children under the age of 18 living with them, 37.2% were married couples living together, 12.8% had a female householder with no husband present, and 48.7% were non-families. 44.9% of all households were made up of individuals, and 21.8% had someone living alone who was 65 years of age or older. The average household size was 1.90 and the average family size was 2.58.

In the city, the population was spread out, with 14.9% under the age of 18, 6.1% from 18 to 24, 25.0% from 25 to 44, 28.4% from 45 to 64, and 25.7% who were 65 years of age or older. The median age was 49 years. For every 100 females, there were 72.1 males. For every 100 females age 18 and over, there were 85.3 males.

The median income for a household in the city was $19,375, and the median income for a family was $21,042. Males had a median income of $41,875 versus $20,313 for females. The per capita income for the city was $16,066. There were 10.8% of families and 18.6% of the population living below the poverty line, including 25.0% of under eighteens and 21.7% of those over 64.

== Education ==
Washington is within the Hope School District. Students attend Hope High School. The former Washington School District was dissolved on July 1, 1990, with its territory given to the Hope school district as well as the Blevins and Saratoga school districts.

== Culture ==
Washington is home to Historic Washington State Park.

== Notable people ==
- James Black (1800–1872), blacksmith who crafted the Bowie knife based upon a design by Jim Bowie
- Augustus Hill Garland (1832–1899), 38th Attorney General of the United States
- Benjamin P. Jett (1808–1855), Speaker of the Arkansas House of Representatives
- Daniel Webster Jones (1839–1918), 19th governor of Arkansas
- Charles B. Mitchel (1815–1864), Confederate Senator from Arkansas
- Albert G. Simms (1882–1964), U.S. Representative from New Mexico

== See also ==
- List of cities and towns in Arkansas
- List of memorials to George Washington
- National Register of Historic Places listings in Hempstead County, Arkansas
