= Emmet, Arkansas =

- City
- Location of Emmet in Hempstead County and Nevada County, Arkansas.
- Coordinates: 33°43′22″N 93°27′57″W
- Country: United States
- State: Arkansas
- Counties: Nevada, Hempstead

Area
  - Total: 1.46 sq mi (3.79 km^{2})
  - Land: 1.44 sq mi (3.73 km^{2})
  - Water: 0.023 sq mi (0.06 km^{2})
- Elevation: 305 ft (93 m)

Population (2020)
  - Total: 415
  - Estimate (2025): 393 ▼
  - Density: 287.8/sq mi (111.13/km^{2})
- Time zone: UTC-6 (Central (CST))
  - Summer (DST): UTC-5 (CDT)
- ZIP code: 71835
- Area code: 870
- FIPS code: 05-21610
- GNIS feature ID: 2403565
- Website: cityofemmet.com

Emmet is a city in Nevada and Hempstead counties in the U.S. state of Arkansas. It is located at the intersection of U.S. Highway 67 and Arkansas Highway 299 in the Arkansas Timberlands region of southwest Arkansas. It is part of the larger Ark-La-Tex tri-state region. As of the 2020 census, the population of Emmet was 415.

== History ==
The area around Emmet had long been inhabited by the Caddo people, prior to European colonization of the Americas. It consisted of gently rolling hills and prairies, interspersed with dense timber and fertile lowlands.

By the time of the Louisiana Purchase, the natural fauna was being removed in favor of more profitable crops. Wildlife that had been an important sustenance for the Natives was also being removed, and over time the Caddo population was greatly diminished.

In the years following Arkansas statehood, settlers began flowing steadily in. Some were following the Southwest Trail to Fulton on the Red River, while others saw opportunity in the area where Emmet would be established.

In 1837, Martin Edwards secured one of the first land patents in Arkansas. His property encompassed the area that would include the community of Burkville, precursor to the city of Emmet.

== Geography ==
Emmet is located in western Nevada County. A small portion of the city extends west into Hempstead County.

The city is situated near the headwaters of the Terre Rouge Creek watershed which meanders northeastward for 17 miles (27 km) before joining the Little Missouri River at a point 11 miles (18 km) east of Prescott and 6 miles (10 km) northwest of Reader. The Prairie d'Ane is 8 miles (13 km) northeast of Emmet, and the Prairie de Roan is 8 miles (13 km) to the southwest. Both prairies were noted by Robert T. Hill during the Arkansas Geological Survey of 1888.

U.S. Highway 67 passes through the northwest side of Emmet, leading northeast 8 miles (13 km) to Prescott and southwest the same distance to Hope. Arkansas Highway 299 passes through the center of Emmet, leading east 24 miles (39 km) to Bluff City and west 3 miles (5 km) to Interstate 30, that highway's closest access to Emmet.

According to the United States Census Bureau, Emmet has a total area of 1.5 square miles (3.9 km^{2}), of which 0.02 square miles (0.06 km^{2}), or 1.43%, are water.

== Demographics ==
Historical population
Census	Pop.	Note	%±
1900	277		—
1910	270		−2.5%
1920	420		55.6%
1930	387		−7.9%
1940	465		20.2%
1950	482		3.7%
1960	474		−1.7%
1970	433		−8.6%
1980	475		9.7%
1990	446		−6.1%
2000	506		13.5%
2010	518		2.4%
2020	415		−19.9%
2025 (est.)	393	▼	−5.3%
U.S. Decennial Census; 2018 Estimate

As of the census of 2000, there were 506 people, 186 households, and 129 families residing in the city. The population density was 333.4 inhabitants per square mile (128.7/km^{2}). There were 220 housing units at an average density of 145.0 per square mile (56.0/km^{2}). The racial makeup of the city was 77.67% White, 20.16% Black or African American, 0.40% Native American, 0.20% from other races, and 1.58% from two or more races. 0.40% of the population were Hispanic or Latino of any race.

There were 186 households, out of which 39.8% had children under the age of 18 living with them, 46.8% were married couples living together, 16.7% had a female householder with no husband present, and 30.6% were non-families. 26.3% of all households were made up of individuals, and 10.8% had someone living alone who was 65 years of age or older. The average household size was 2.72 and the average family size was 3.31.

In the city, the population was spread out, with 32.2% under the age of 18, 7.5% from 18 to 24, 30.4% from 25 to 44, 18.8% from 45 to 64, and 11.1% who were 65 years of age or older. The median age was 32 years. For every 100 females, there were 98.4 males. For every 100 females age 18 and over, there were 85.4 males.

The median income for a household in the city was $22,386, and the median income for a family was $26,250. Males had a median income of $24,107 versus $22,250 for females. The per capita income for the city was $11,726. About 30.0% of families and 33.4% of the population were below the poverty line, including 47.4% of those under age 18 and 20.0% of those age 65 or over.

== Education ==
Public education for elementary and secondary school students is available from the Blevins School District, which leads to graduation from Blevins High School.

On July 1, 2004, the Emmet School District consolidated into the Blevins School District. Emmet Elementary School and Emmet High School were formerly in operation.

== Notable places ==
=== National Register ===
- Emmet Methodist Church, one of the few Akron Plan church buildings in Arkansas
- Ephesus Cemetery, burial site for many of Emmet's early settlers

=== Commerce ===
- B & P Pattern Lumber Sales, custom materials provider
- CenterPoint Energy (Ark-La Gas Company), regional offices
- Flaherty's Fish Farm, a fish hatchery

=== Ark-La Village ===
In 1959, Arkansas Louisiana Gas Company opened a western-themed tourist attraction at the direction of Wilton R. Stephens, founder of Stephens Inc. and Arkla Village. Ark-La Village was a re-creation of an 1880s western settlement where patrons could participate in the "daily life" of early pioneers. It was located on the company's property inside Emmet's northern city limits.

When first constructed, the "village" featured a saloon and general store, a livery stable, and a museum. Other attractions included a miniature train ride, a paddlewheel boat ride, a bowling alley, a restaurant, and a "jail" where comical, behind-the-bars photos could be taken. Connected with the village was a factory that built horse-drawn carriages and horse saddles.

In 1961, a shooting roundup was held and Harold M. Terry was the invited marksman.

Though popular with tourists and local citizens, it was the traffic along U.S. Highway 67 between Little Rock and Dallas that provided Ark-La Village with most of its patrons. That customer base was lost when the final section of Interstate 30 was completed in 1972. As a result, the village was closed in the early 1970s, with the restaurant and bowling alley closing a few years later.

In the following years, some portions of the property have been donated to the city of Emmet. Re-development has included a new city park and a building for public meetings.

== Media ==
Emmet is served by the Hope Prescott News, a local paper owned by a partnership of Mark Keith and Wendell Hoover. The Hope Star and the Nevada County Picayune, owned by GateHouse Media, closed in 2019. Larger newspapers that serve the area include the Arkansas Democrat-Gazette, the Texarkana Gazette, and the Shreveport Times.

Local radio stations include KHPA (104.9 MHz FM) and KTPA (1370 kHz AM). In addition, the city is served by radio and television stations from Little Rock, and Shreveport.

A variety of telephone, cable TV, and internet providers are available to subscribers in Emmet, including SWARK.Today (Southwest Arkansas), Hope-Prescott.com, a local internet-news web site.

== Infrastructure ==
- Interstate 30
- U.S. Highway 67
- Arkansas Highway 299

== Notable person ==
- Tom Hughes (1907 - 1989), MLB outfielder, 1930 Detroit Tigers
