= Perrytown, Arkansas =

- Town
- Location of Perrytown in Hempstead County, Arkansas.
- Coordinates: 33°41′50″N 93°32′02″W
- Country: United States
- State: Arkansas
- County: Hempstead
- Established: 1959

Area
  - Total: 1.41 sq mi (3.65 km^{2})
  - Land: 1.39 sq mi (3.61 km^{2})
  - Water: 0.012 sq mi (0.03 km^{2})
- Elevation: 292 ft (89 m)

Population (2020)
  - Total: 232
  - Estimate (2025): 222 ▼
  - Density: 166.4/sq mi (64.24/km^{2})
- Time zone: UTC-6 (Central (CST))
  - Summer (DST): UTC-5 (CDT)
- ZIP code: 71801
- Area code: 870
- FIPS code: 05-54680
- GNIS feature ID: 2407102

Perrytown is a town in Hempstead County, Arkansas, United States. As of the 2020 census, Perrytown had a population of 232. It is part of the Hope Micropolitan Statistical Area and was founded in 1959 by local entrepreneur Perry Campbell.

== Geography ==
According to the United States Census Bureau, the city has a total area of 1.5 square miles (3.9 km^{2}), all land.

== Demographics ==
Historical population
Census	Pop.	Note	%±
1970	148		—
1980	282		90.5%
1990	248		−12.1%
2000	255		2.8%
2010	272		6.7%
2020	232		−14.7%
2025 (est.)	222	▼	−4.3%
U.S. Decennial Census

As of the census of 2000, there were 255 people, 119 households, and 82 families residing in the city. The population density was 164.9 inhabitants per square mile (63.7/km^{2}). There were 128 housing units at an average density of 82.8 per square mile (32.0/km^{2}). The racial makeup of the city was 87.45% White, 9.02% Black or African American, 0.39% Native American, 3.14% from other races. 4.31% of the population were Hispanic or Latino of any race.

There were 119 households, out of which 19.3% had children under the age of 18 living with them, 58.8% were married couples living together, 7.6% had a female householder with no husband present, and 30.3% were non-families. 26.9% of all households were made up of individuals, and 8.4% had someone living alone who was 65 years of age or older. The average household size was 2.14 and the average family size was 2.54.

In the city the population was spread out, with 16.9% under the age of 18, 9.8% from 18 to 24, 21.6% from 25 to 44, 34.1% from 45 to 64, and 17.6% who were 65 years of age or older. The median age was 46 years. For every 100 females, there were 83.5 males. For every 100 females age 18 and over, there were 86.0 males.

The median income for a household in the city was $30,625, and the median income for a family was $38,438. Males had a median income of $31,250 versus $16,786 for females. The per capita income for the city was $23,059. About 11.5% of families and 10.5% of the population were below the poverty line, including 7.7% of those under the age of eighteen and 3.4% of those 65 or over.

== Education ==
It is within the Hope School District. It operates Hope High School.
