= Emmet Methodist Church =

Historic church in Arkansas, United States

- U.S. National Register of Historic Places
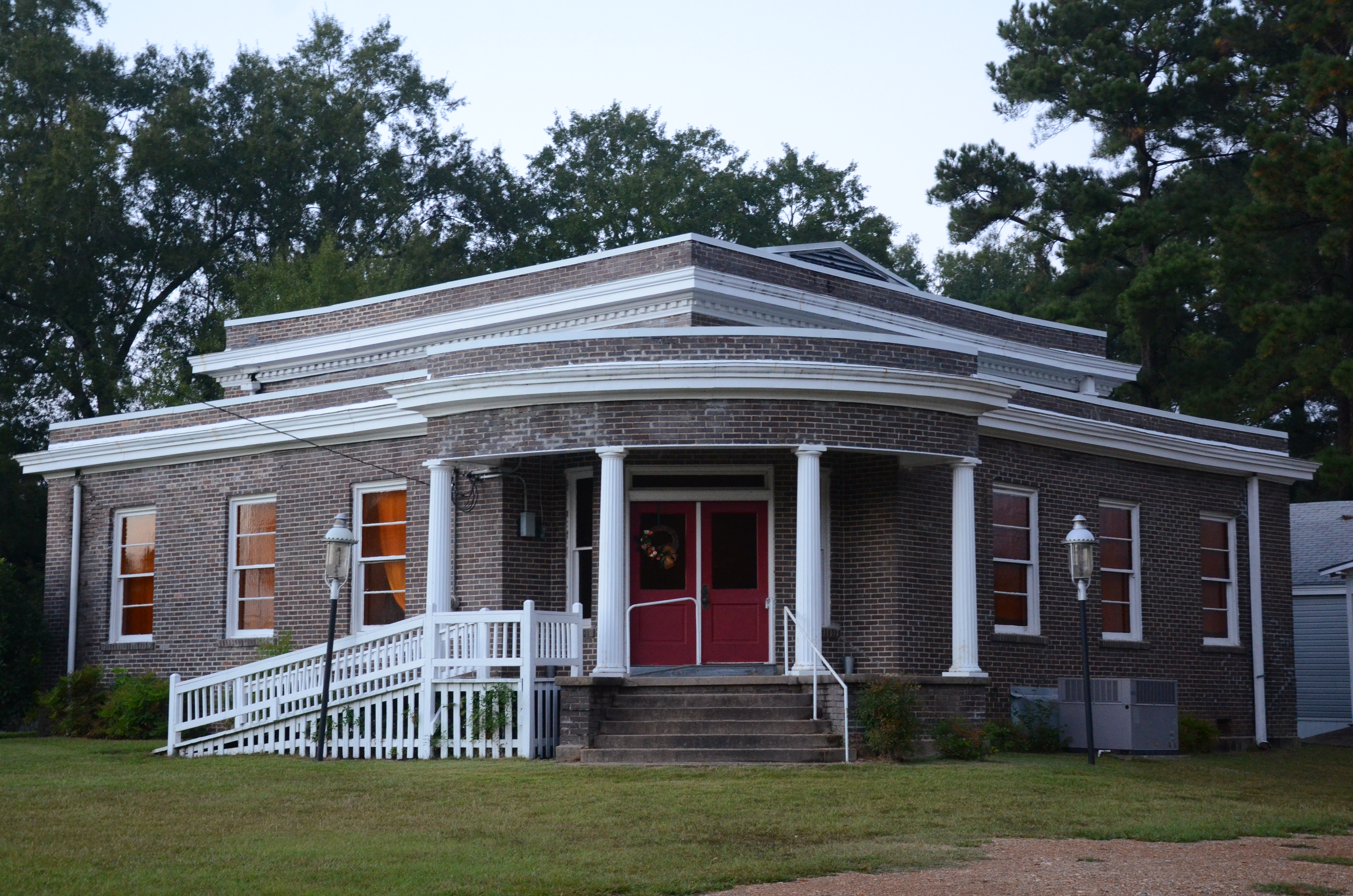

- Location within Arkansas Location within the United States
- Location: 209 S. Walnut, Emmet, Arkansas
- Coordinates: 33°43′39″N 93°28′17″W
- Area: less than one acre
- Built: 1917
- Architectural style: Colonial Revival
- NRHP reference No.: 09000742
- Added to NRHP: September 23, 2009

Emmet Methodist Church is a historic church at 209 S. Walnut in Emmet, Arkansas. Built between 1917 & 1918, it is one of the few Akron Plan church buildings in the state, and it is a fine local example of Colonial Revival architecture. Its main entrance is highlighted by a curved portico supported by four columns topped with simple curved capitals. The church was listed on the National Register of Historic Places in 2009. and it serves a congregation which was organized in 1855. The congregation was closed by the United Methodist Church in 2024.

== Church ==
The Emmet, Arkansas, First Methodist Church, Nevada County, Arkansas, was founded about 1855 as part of the Moscow Circuit of the Methodist Church, South. It was originally known as Bethel Church and the congregation met in a log structure that also served as a schoolhouse. This continued until about 1880, when minister, Thomas J. Sage, led an effort to construct a church building. New church buildings were constructed in 1891 and in 1917. The 1917 church building was listed in the National Register of Historic Places in 2009.

== Fellowship hall ==
In 1948, the congregation moved a white frame building alongside the church to serve as its fellowship hall. The building had been used during World War II as "Hospital Building No. 325" at the United States Army's Southwestern Proving Ground, which was located in Hempstead County, just north of Hope. The building was originally designed by the firm of Howard, Needles, Tammen & Bergendoff and it was constructed by the 'Callahan Construction Company' in 1941.

== See also ==
- National Register of Historic Places listings in Nevada County, Arkansas
