= Hope High School (Arkansas) =

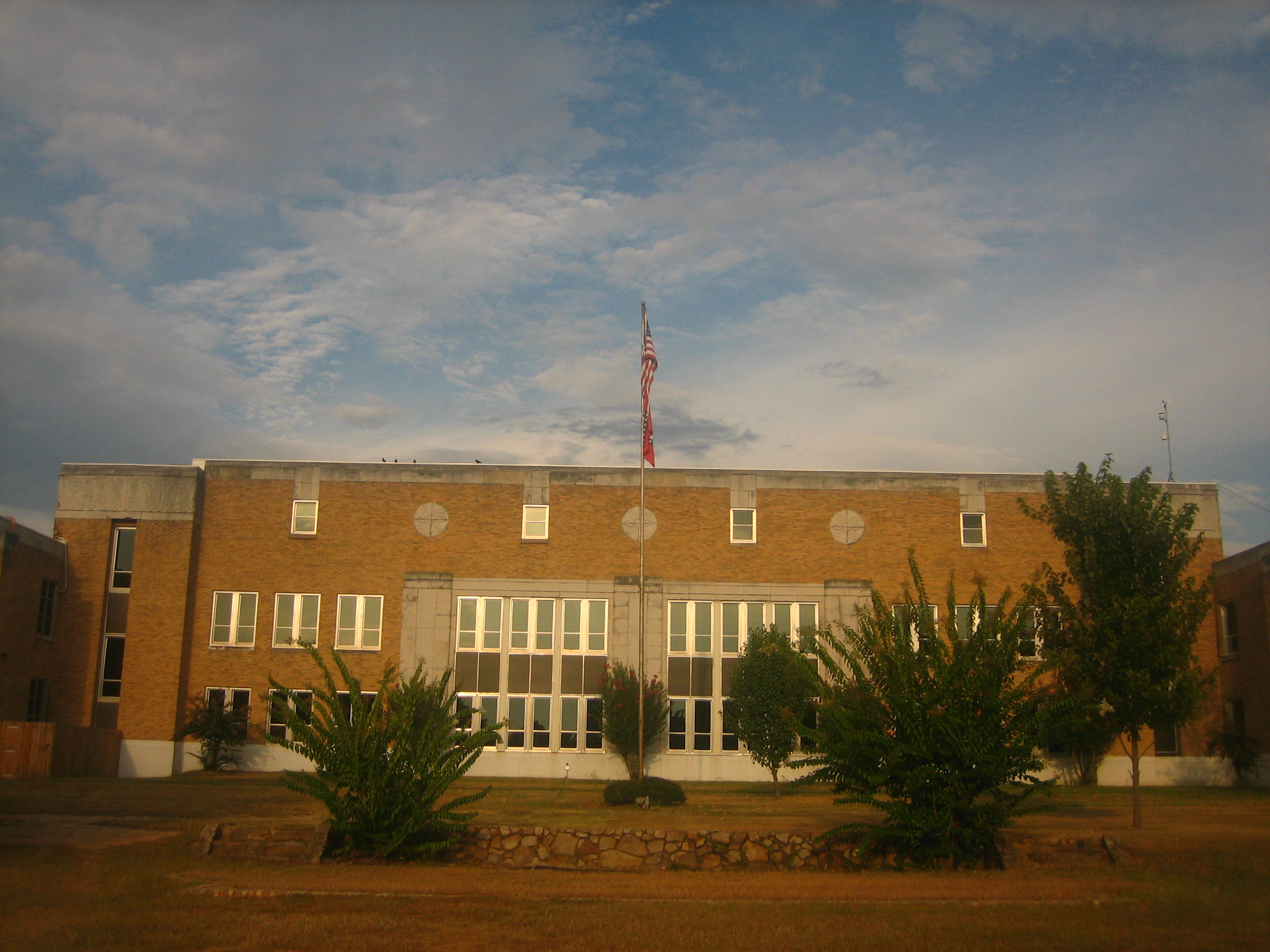

Location
- 1701 South Main Street; Hope, Arkansas 71801; United States
- Coordinates: 33°39′8″N 93°35′9″W

Information
- Type: Public secondary
- Established: 1922 (Garland HS); 1931 (Hope HS)
- School district: Hope School District
- NCES District ID: 0507840
- CEEB code: 041125
- NCES School ID: 050784000498
- Faculty: 85.27 (on an FTE basis)
- Grades: 9–12
- Student to teacher ratio: 7.11
- Colors: Red and white
- Athletics conference: 5A South (2012-14)
- Mascot: Bobcat
- Team name: Hope Bobcats
- Website: www.hpsdistrict.org/o/hope-high-school

Hope High School is a comprehensive public secondary school in Hope, Arkansas, United States. The school serves grades 9 through 12 and is the only such school in the Hope city limits, as well as one of four high schools in Hempstead County. It is the sole high school in the Hope School District.

It serves Hope, Fulton, Oakhaven, Patmos, Perrytown, and Washington.

== History ==
Hope High School's main facilities that are formed in the shape of an "H" were established in 1931 to replace Garland High School built in 1922 and which was subsequently condemned the previous year in 1930 due to poor construction.

The school is accredited by AdvancED since 1928.

== Curriculum ==
The assumed course of study follows the Smart Core curriculum developed by the Arkansas Department of Education (ADE), which requires students to complete at least 22 units to graduate. Students complete regular courses and exams and may self-select Advanced Placement (AP) coursework and exams with the opportunity for college credit. The school is accredited by the ADE, and since 1928 by AdvancED.

== Extracurricular activities ==
The Hope High School mascot is the Bobcat with red and white serving as its school colors. For 2012–14, the Hope Bobcats compete in the 5A South Conference under the administration of the Arkansas Activities Association (AAA). Interscholastic activities include baseball, cheer, football, golf (boys/girls), softball, and track (boys/girls).

== Notable alumni ==
- McTelvin Agim (2016)—football player
- Vince Foster (1963)—politician; lawyer, former Deputy White House Counsel to President Bill Clinton
- Mike Huckabee (1973)—politician; 44th Governor of Arkansas (1996–2007)
- Mike Ross (1979)—politician; U.S. Representative (Arkansas 4th congressional district)
- Lavenski Smith (1976)—lawyer; judge on the United States Court of Appeals for the Eighth Circuit
- Rosendo Rodriguez (1998)— convicted murderer

== See also ==
- Spring Hill High School - In an unincorporated area near Hope, with a Hope postal address but not in the city limits
