= Patmos, Arkansas =

- Town
- Location of Patmos in Hempstead County, Arkansas.
- Coordinates: 33°30′41″N 93°34′01″W
- Country: United States
- State: Arkansas
- County: Hempstead

Area
  - Total: 0.11 sq mi (0.29 km^{2})
  - Land: 0.11 sq mi (0.29 km^{2})
  - Water: 0 sq mi (0.00 km^{2})
- Elevation: 318 ft (97 m)

Population (2020)
  - Total: 57
  - Estimate (2025): 57
  - Density: 512.6/sq mi (197.92/km^{2})
- Time zone: UTC-6 (Central (CST))
  - Summer (DST): UTC-5 (CDT)
- FIPS code: 05-53900
- GNIS feature ID: 2407079

Patmos is a town in Hempstead County, Arkansas, United States. As of the 2020 census, Patmos had a population of 57. It bears the same name as the Greek island of Patmos.

Patmos is part of the Hope Micropolitan Statistical Area.

== Geography ==
Patmos is located in southern Hempstead County. Arkansas Highway 355 passes through the town, leading southeast 26 miles (42 km) to Waldo and west then north 10 miles (16 km) to Spring Hill. Hope, the Hempstead County seat, is 12 miles (19 km) north of Patmos via Patmos Road.

According to the United States Census Bureau, the town has a total area of 0.1 square miles (0.3 km^{2}), all land.

== Demographics ==
Historical population
| Census | Pop. | Note | %± |
|---|---|---|---|
| 1970 | 77 | | — |
| 1980 | 88 | | 14.3% |
| 1990 | 32 | | −63.6% |
| 2000 | 61 | | 90.6% |
| 2010 | 64 | | 4.9% |
| 2020 | 57 | | −10.9% |
| 2025 (est.) | 57 | Steady | 0.0% |
U.S. Decennial Census

As of the census of 2000, there were 61 people, 21 households, and 17 families residing in the town. The population density was 196.3/km^{2} (506.0/mi^{2}). There were 26 housing units at an average density of 83.7/km^{2} (215.7/mi^{2}). The racial makeup of the town was 93.44% White, 1.64% from other races, and 4.92% from two or more races. 1.64% of the population were Hispanic or Latino of any race.

There were 21 households, out of which 42.9% had children under the age of 18 living with them, 81.0% were married couples living together, and 14.3% were non-families. 14.3% of all households were made up of individuals, and 9.5% had someone living alone who was 65 years of age or older. The average household size was 2.90 and the average family size was 3.22.

In the town, the population was spread out, with 26.2% under the age of 18, 6.6% from 18 to 24, 34.4% from 25 to 44, 18.0% from 45 to 64, and 14.8% who were 65 years of age or older. The median age was 37 years. For every 100 females, there were 90.6 males. For every 100 females age 18 and over, there were 114.3 males.

The median income for a household in the town was $43,500, and the median income for a family was $44,000. Males had a median income of $16,875 versus $15,000 for females. The per capita income for the town was $13,597. There were no families and 3.4% of the population living below the poverty line, including no under eighteens and none of those over 64.

== Education ==
It is within the Hope School District. It operates Hope High School.

In 1979 the Patmos School District merged into the Hope School District.
