= Clow, Arkansas =

Unincorporated community in Hempstead County, Arkansas, United States

Coordinates: 33°53′23″N 93°46′22″W

Clow is an unincorporated community in Hempstead County, Arkansas, United States. It lies approximately 1 1/3 miles (2.1 km) from the boundary between Hempstead and Howard counties. Clow is home to the Clow Schools Alumni Association. The main road that goes through this community is Hempstead County Road #37.

Clow is part of the Hope Micropolitan Statistical Area.
