= SH High School =

SH High School may refer to:

- Shawnee Heights High School
- Spring Hill High School (Arkansas)
- Spring Hill High School (Texas)
