= Oakhaven, Arkansas =

- Town
- Location of Oakhaven in Hempstead County, Arkansas.
- Coordinates: 33°43′46″N 93°37′15″W
- Country: United States
- State: Arkansas
- County: Hempstead

Area
  - Total: 0.046 sq mi (0.12 km^{2})
  - Land: 0.046 sq mi (0.12 km^{2})
  - Water: 0 sq mi (0.00 km^{2})
- Elevation: 367 ft (112 m)

Population (2020)
  - Total: 65
  - Estimate (2025): 63 ▼
  - Density: 1,412.7/sq mi (545.45/km^{2})
- Time zone: UTC-6 (Central (CST))
  - Summer (DST): UTC-5 (CDT)
- FIPS code: 05-51080
- GNIS feature ID: 2407025

Oakhaven is a town in Hempstead County, Arkansas, United States. As of the 2020 census, Oakhaven had a population of 65. It is part of the Hope Micropolitan Statistical Area.

== Geography ==
According to the United States Census Bureau, the city has a total area of 0.1 square miles (0.26 km^{2}), all land.

== Demographics ==
Historical population
Census	Pop.	Note	%±
1950	81		—
1960	87		7.4%
1970	83		−4.6%
1980	72		−13.3%
1990	35		−51.4%
2000	54		54.3%
2010	63		16.7%
2020	65		3.2%
2025 (est.)	63	▼	−3.1%
U.S. Decennial Census

As of the census of 2000, there were 54 people, 20 households, and 17 families residing in the city. The population density was 985.7 inhabitants per square mile (380.6/km^{2}). There were 24 housing units at an average density of 438.1 per square mile (169.2/km^{2}). The racial makeup of the city was 90.74% White, 1.85% from other races, and 7.41% from two or more races. 1.85% of the population were Hispanic or Latino of any race.

There were 20 households, out of which 45.0% had children under the age of 18 living with them, 60.0% were married couples living together, 20.0% had a female householder with no husband present, and 15.0% were non-families. 15.0% of all households were made up of individuals, and 15.0% had someone living alone who was 65 years of age or older. The average household size was 2.70 and the average family size was 3.00.

In the city the population was spread out, with 35.2% under the age of 18, 7.4% from 18 to 24, 18.5% from 25 to 44, 20.4% from 45 to 64, and 18.5% who were 65 years of age or older. The median age was 35 years. For every 100 females, there were 86.2 males. For every 100 females age 18 and over, there were 94.4 males.

The median income for a household in the city was $63,750, and the median income for a family was $63,750. Males had a median income of $63,125 versus $25,625 for females. The per capita income for the city was $22,535. None of the population and none of the families were below the poverty line.

== Education ==
It is within the Hope School District. It operates Hope High School.
