= Blevins, Arkansas =

- City
- Location of Blevins in Hempstead County, Arkansas.
- Coordinates: 33°52′27″N 93°34′40″W
- Country: United States
- State: Arkansas
- County: Hempstead

Area
  - Total: 1.00 sq mi (2.58 km^{2})
  - Land: 1.00 sq mi (2.58 km^{2})
  - Water: 0 sq mi (0.00 km^{2})
- Elevation: 417 ft (127 m)

Population (2020)
  - Total: 288
  - Estimate (2025): 282 ▼
  - Density: 289.7/sq mi (111.84/km^{2})
- Time zone: UTC-6 (Central (CST))
  - Summer (DST): UTC-5 (CDT)
- ZIP code: 71825
- Area code: 870
- FIPS code: 05-07030
- GNIS feature ID: 2403878

Blevins is a city in Hempstead County, Arkansas, United States. The population was 288 at the 2020 census, down from 315 in 2010. It is part of the Hope Micropolitan Statistical Area.

== Geography ==
Blevins is located in northeastern Hempstead County. U.S. Route 371 passes through the city as Center Street, leading southeast 15 miles (24 km) to Prescott and northwest 19 miles (31 km) to Nashville. Arkansas Highway 29 is Main Street in Blevins, crossing US 371 in the center of town and leading northeast 18 miles (29 km) to Antoine and south 15 miles (24 km) to Hope, the Hempstead County seat.

According to the United States Census Bureau, the city of Blevins has a total area of 1.0 square mile (2.6 km^{2}), all land.

== Demographics ==
Historical population
Census	Pop.	Note	%±
1930	291		—
1940	331		13.7%
1950	271		−18.1%
1960	198		−26.9%
1970	265		33.8%
1980	314		18.5%
1990	253		−19.4%
2000	365		44.3%
2010	315		−13.7%
2020	288		−8.6%
2025 (est.)	282	▼	−2.1%
U.S. Decennial Census; 2014 Estimate

At the 2000 census, there were 365 people, 131 households and 102 families residing in the city. The population density was 365.8 inhabitants per square mile (141.2/km^{2}). There were 152 housing units at an average density of 152.4 per square mile (58.8/km^{2}). The racial makeup of the city was 73.15% White, 14.25% Black or African American, 2.47% Native American, 7.67% from other races, and 2.47% from two or more races. 18.36% of the population were Hispanic or Latino of any race.

There were 131 households, of which 38.2% had children under the age of 18 living with them, 58.8% were married couples living together, 14.5% had a female householder with no husband present, and 22.1% were non-families. 19.8% of all households were made up of individuals, and 11.5% had someone living alone who was 65 years of age or older. The average household size was 2.79 and the average family size was 3.21.

28.2% of the population were under the age of 18, 10.7% from 18 to 24, 22.7% from 25 to 44, 24.4% from 45 to 64, and 14.0% who were 65 years of age or older. The median age was 35 years. For every 100 females, there were 102.8 males. For every 100 females age 18 and over, there were 100.0 males.

The median household income was $31,875 and the median family income was $38,750. Males had a median income of $25,313 versus $18,750 for females. The per capita income for the city was $11,720. About 19.6% of families and 22.1% of the population were below the poverty line, including 25.9% of those under age 18 and 6.9% of those age 65 or over.

== Education ==
Public education for elementary and secondary school students is available from the Blevins School District, which leads to graduation from Blevins High School.
