= Hope micropolitan area =

Hope Micropolitan Area
- Micropolitan Statistical Area
- Hope, AR Micropolitan Statistical Area
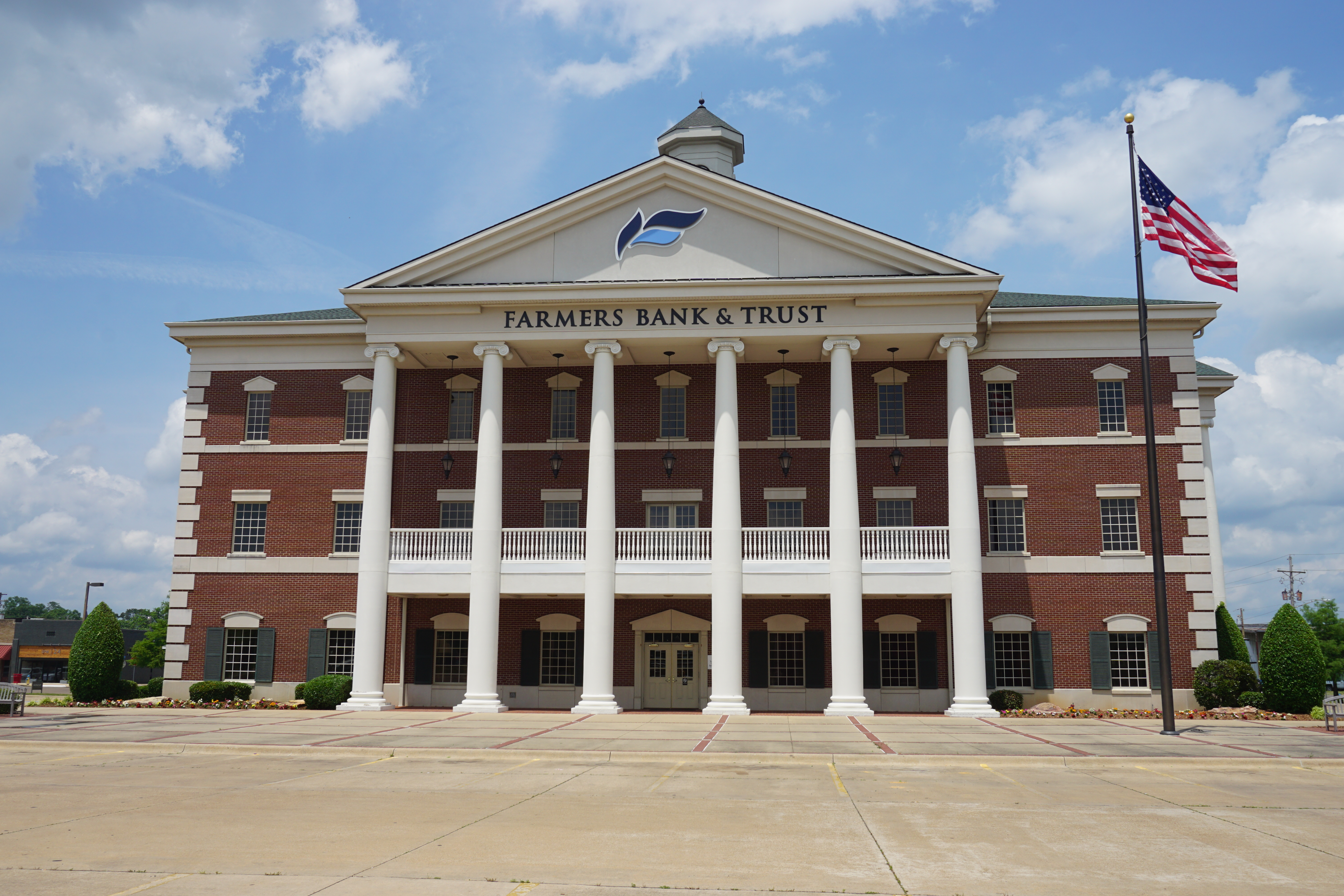
- Hempstead County Courthouse in Hope
Interactive Map of Hope, AR μSA
City of Hope
Hope, AR μSA
- Country: United States
- State: Arkansas
- Largest city: Hope
- Other city: Prescott
- Time zone: UTC−6 (CST)
  - Summer (DST): UTC−5 (CDT)

The Hope Micropolitan Statistical Area, as defined by the United States Census Bureau, is an area consisting of two counties in the U.S. state of Arkansas, anchored by the city of Hope.

As of the 2010 census, the μSA had a population of 31,606 (though a 2016 estimate placed the population at 30,372).

== Counties ==
- Hempstead
- Nevada

== Communities ==
=== Places with more than 9,001 inhabitants ===
- Hope (Principal city)

=== Places with 3,000 to 4,000 inhabitants ===
- Prescott

=== Places with 125 to 500 inhabitants ===
- Emmet
- Blevins
- Parrytown
- Rosston
- Fulton
- Washington
- Willisville
- Bodcaw

=== Places with less than 125 inhabitants ===
- Bluff City
- McCaskill
- Ozan
- Cale
- McNab
- Patmos
- Oakhaven

=== Census-designated places ===
- Reader (partial)

=== Unincorporated places ===
- Clow

== Demographics ==
As of the census of 2000, there were 33,542 people, 12,852 households, and 9,099 families residing within the μSA. The racial makeup of the μSA was 64.35% White, 30.60% African American, 0.41% Native American, 0.14% Asian, 0.01% Pacific Islander, 3.18% from other races, and 1.31% from two or more races. Hispanic or Latino of any race were 6.25% of the population.

The median income for a household in the μSA was $27,792, and the median income for a family was $33,589. Males had a median income of $26,859 versus $17,652 for females. The per capita income for the μSA was $14,144.

== See also ==
- Arkansas census statistical areas
