= Washington School District (Arkansas) =

Former school district in Arkansas, U.S.

Washington School District was a school district in Hempstead County, Arkansas, headquartered in Washington.

It was dissolved on July 1, 1990. Its territory was given to Blevins, Hope, and Saratoga school districts.
