= Spring Hill School District (Arkansas) =

School district in Arkansas, United States

Location
- 633 AR 355 West; Hempstead County, Arkansas (Hope mailing address) 71801 United States

District information
- Grades: K–12
- Superintendent: Tom Wilson
- Accreditations: ADE; AdvancED
- Schools: 2
- NCES District ID: 0505680

Students and staff
- Students: 511
- Teachers: 44.41 (on FTE basis)
- Staff: 87.41 (on FTE basis)
- Student–teacher ratio: 11.51
- District mascot: Bear
- Colors: Blue; Gold

Other information
- USNWR HS ranking: Silver Award #13 (AR) #1669 (USA) #20 (Most Connected)
- Website: www.shbears.org

Spring Hill School District is a public school district based in unincorporated Hempstead County, Arkansas, United States, with a Hope postal address but outside of the Hope city limits. The school district serves more than 500 students in kindergarten through grade 12 and employs more than 85 faculty and staff on a full time equivalent basis for its two schools.

The school district encompasses 70.29 square miles (182.1 km^{2}) of land in Hempstead County.

== Schools ==
Both schools are accredited by the Arkansas Department of Education (ADE). The schools' mascot is the Bear with blue and gold serving as the schools' colors.

- Spring Hill High School, serving more than 250 students in grades 7 through 12.
- Spring Hill Ełementary School, serving more than 250 students in kindergarten through grade 6.

In 2012, Spring Hill was nationally recognized with the Silver Award in the U.S. News & World Report Best High Schools ranking report as the No. 13 school in the state and No. 1,669 in the nation, along with No. 20 in the report's Most Connected School ranking. The school is accredited by AdvancED since 1964.

Spring Hill is one of twenty high schools to be recognized with the 2012 College Readiness Award by the Arkansas ACT Council in recognition of improving the participation rate of students taking the ACT college readiness exam.
