= McTelvin Agim =

American football player (born 1997)

Profile
- Position: Nose tackle

Personal information
- Born: September 25, 1997 (age 29); Texarkana, Texas, U.S.
- Listed height: 6 ft 3 in (1.91 m)
- Listed weight: 300 lb (136 kg)

Career information
- High school: Hope (Hope, Arkansas)
- College: Arkansas (2016–2019)
- NFL draft: 2020: 3rd round, 95th overall pick

Career history
- Denver Broncos (2020–2022); Indianapolis Colts (2022–2023); Houston Texans (2023–2024)*; Indianapolis Colts (2024)*; Tennessee Titans (2024)*; Cincinnati Bengals (2025)*
- * Offseason or practice squad member only

Career NFL statistics as of 2024
- Total tackles: 14
- Sacks: 1.5
- Pass deflections: 2
- Stats at Pro Football Reference

McTelvin Obinna Agim (born September 25, 1997) is an American professional football nose tackle. He played college football for the Arkansas Razorbacks and was drafted in the third round of the 2020 NFL draft by the Denver Broncos. He has also played for the Indianapolis Colts.

== Early life ==
Agim was born in the United States and is of Nigerian descent through his father. After playing his freshman season at Rowlett High School in Rowlett, Texas, Agim played his final three seasons of high school football at Hope High School in Hope, Arkansas. He was the top-rated player in Arkansas for the class of 2016. At various points in his high school career, Agim played defensive end, split end, running back and quarterback. The five-star recruit committed to Arkansas on September 9, 2015, choosing the Razorbacks over Baylor, Ole Miss, Texas A&M and others. After his senior season in 2016, Agim was named Gatorade Arkansas Player of the Year and a USA Today All-American.

== College career ==
Agim cracked the starting lineup at defensive end midway through his true freshman season at Arkansas, and held that position his sophomore year before splitting time between defensive end and defensive tackle, still starting all 12 games as a junior. After his junior season, coach Chad Morris looked to shift Agim from defensive end to defensive tackle and told him to leave the program if he wasn't comfortable with that. After his senior season, Agim was a late addition to the roster of the 2020 Senior Bowl. He also participated in the East-West Shrine Game and 2020 NFL Combine.

== Professional career ==
Pre-draft measurables
Height	Weight	Arm length	Hand span	40-yard dash	10-yard split	20-yard split	20-yard shuttle	Three-cone drill	Vertical jump	Broad jump	Bench press
6 ft 2 5/8 in (1.90 m)	309 lb (140 kg)	33 1/2 in (0.85 m)	10 1/8 in (0.26 m)	4.98 s	1.76 s	2.89 s	4.66 s	7.55 s	30.5 in (0.77 m)	9 ft 1 in (2.77 m)	27 reps
All values from NFL Combine/Pro Day

=== Denver Broncos ===
Agim was selected by the Denver Broncos with the 95th overall pick in the third round of the 2020 NFL draft. The Broncos acquired this selection by trading wide receiver Emmanuel Sanders to the San Francisco 49ers. Before his rookie season, Agim chose to wear jersey number 95 because he was selected 95th overall.

On August 30, 2022, Agim was waived by the Broncos and signed to the practice squad the next day. He was released on December 13.

=== Indianapolis Colts (first stint) ===
On December 15, 2022, Agim was signed to the Indianapolis Colts practice squad. He signed a reserve/future contract on January 9, 2023.

On August 30, 2023, Agim was waived by the Colts and re-signed to the practice squad. He was not signed to a reserve/future contract after the season and thus became a free agent upon the expiration of his practice squad contract.

=== Houston Texans ===
On January 16, 2024, Agim was signed to the Houston Texans practice squad. He signed a reserve/future contract on January 22, 2024. He was waived on August 27.

=== Indianapolis Colts (second stint) ===
On August 29, 2024, Agim was signed to the Indianapolis Colts practice squad. He was released on September 17.

=== Tennessee Titans ===
On September 27, 2024, Agim signed with the Tennessee Titans practice squad. He signed a reserve/future contract on January 6, 2025. On April 16, Agim was waived by the Titans.

=== Cincinnati Bengals ===
On July 20, 2025, Agim signed with the Cincinnati Bengals. He was waived on August 25.

== Personal life ==
Agim grew up in a low-income family in Texarkana, Texas. He won two Arkansas high school state shot put championships. Agim is nicknamed "Sosa" because of his similar appearance to Chief Keef.
