= Hope School District =

School district in Arkansas, United States

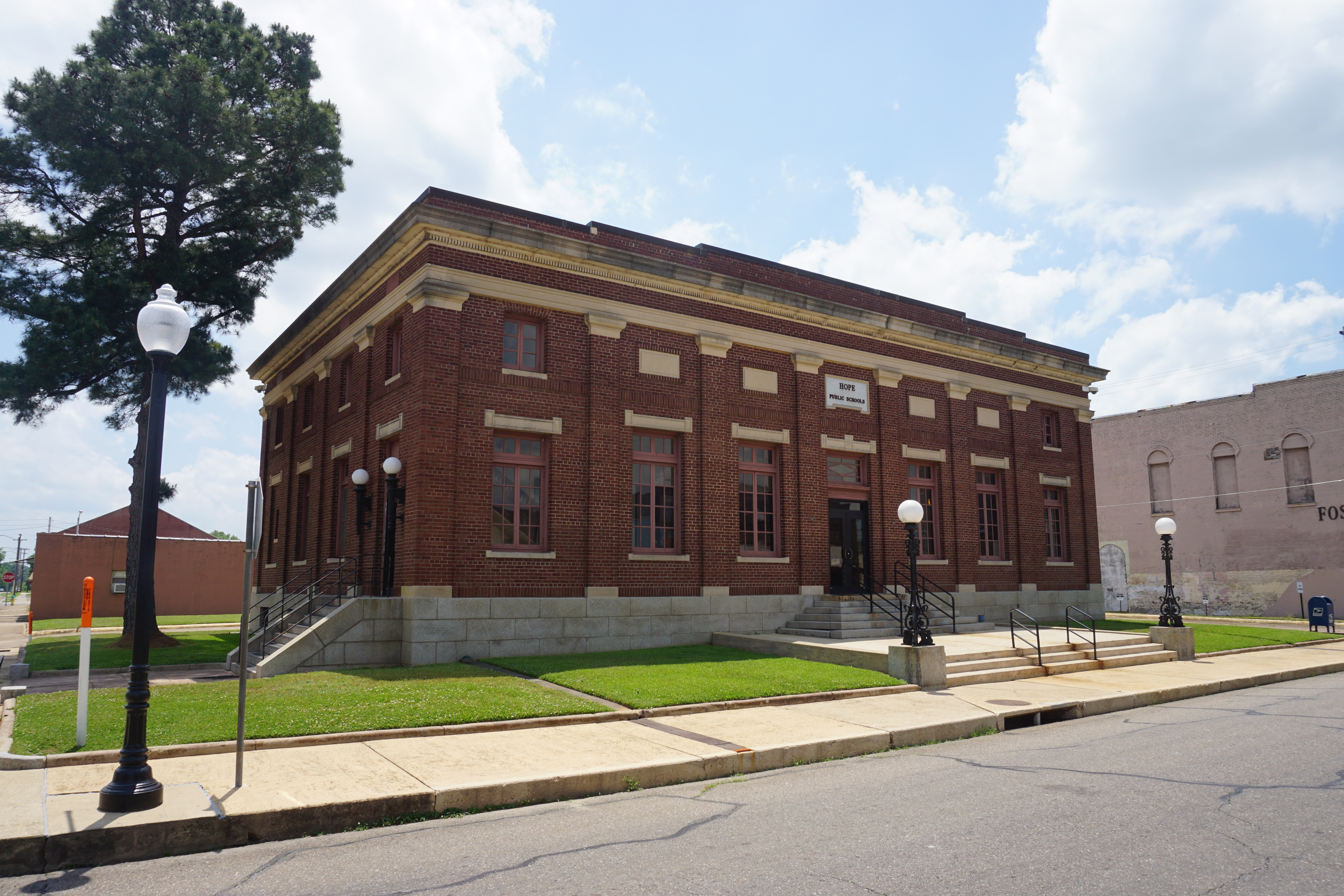
- Hope Public Schools building

Address
- 117 East Second Street Hope, Arkansas, 71801; United States

District information
- Type: Public
- Grades: PreK–12
- NCES District ID: 0507840

Students and staff
- Students: 2,386
- Teachers: 205.33
- Staff: 175.0
- Student–teacher ratio: 11.62

Other information
- Website: www.hpsdistrict.org

Hope School District or Hope Public Schools is a school district in Hempstead County, Arkansas, headquartered in Hope. It serves Hope, Guernsey, Fulton, Oakhaven, Patmos, Perrytown, and Washington.

== History ==
In 1966 the Guernsey School District merged into the Hope School District. And in 1979 the Patmos School District merged into the Hope School District.

The Washington School District was dissolved on July 1, 1990. A portion of its territory was given to the Hope district.

== Schools ==
- Hope High School
- Yerger Middle School
- Beryl Henry Elementary School
- William Jefferson Clinton Primary School

Other:

- Academy of Public Service
- Garland Learning Center
