= Spring Hill High School (Arkansas) =

Location
- 633 Spring Lake Rd; Hope, Arkansas 71801; United States; 33°35′7″N 93°39′3″W

Information
- Type: Public secondary
- School district: Spring Hill School District
- NCES District ID: 0512630
- CEEB code: 041130
- NCES School ID: 051263001018
- Faculty: 43.18 (on FTE basis)
- Grades: 7–12
- Student to teacher ratio: 6.62
- Colors: Blue and gold
- Athletics conference: 2A 7 (2012-14)
- Mascot: Bear
- Team name: Spring Hill Bears
- USNWR ranking: 13th (AR); 1669th (USA)
- Website: www.shbears.org

Spring Hill High School is a secondary school in unincorporated Hempstead County, Arkansas, United States, with a Hope postal address but outside of the Hope city limits. The school serves students in grades 7 through 12. It is one of four high schools in Hempstead County. It is the sole high school in the Spring Hill School District.

== Academics ==
The assumed course of study follows the Smart Core curriculum developed by the Arkansas Department of Education (ADE), which requires students to complete at least 22 units to graduate. Students complete regular courses and exams and may self-select Advanced Placement (AP) coursework and exams with the opportunity for college credit. The school is accredited by the ADE.

In 2012, the U.S. News & World Report Best High Schools ranking report ranked Spring Hill as the No. 13 school in the state and No. 1,669 in the nation. The school is accredited by AdvancED since 1964.

== Extracurricular activities ==
The Spring Hill High School mascot is the Bear with blue and gold serving as its school colors. For 2012–14, the Spring Hill Bears compete in the 2A Region 7 Conference under the administration of the Arkansas Activities Association (AAA). Interscholastic activities include basketball (boys/girls), baseball, cheer, football, golf (boys/girls), softball, and track (boys/girls).
