= Blevins High School =

Location
- 5954 Highway 29 North; Blevins, Arkansas 71825; United States
- Coordinates: 33°52′29″N 93°34′20″W

Information
- Type: Public secondary
- School district: Blevins School District
- NCES District ID: 0503300
- CEEB code: 040225
- NCES School ID: 050330000090
- Teaching staff: 31.59 (on FTE basis)
- Grades: 7–12
- Student to teacher ratio: 6.20
- Colors: Red and white
- Athletics conference: 2A 7 (2012–14)
- Mascot: Hornet
- Team name: Blevins Hornets
- Website: www.blevinshornets.org

Blevins High School is a secondary school in Blevins, Arkansas, United States. The school is the only secondary school serving grades 7 through 12. It is one of four high schools in Hempstead County and is the sole high school in the Blevins School District and Blevins, Arkansas.

== Curriculum ==
The assumed course of study follows the Smart Core curriculum developed by the Arkansas Department of Education (ADE), which requires students to complete at least 22 units to graduate. Students complete regular courses and exams and may self-select Advanced Placement (AP) coursework and exams with the opportunity for college credit. The school is accredited by the ADE.

== Athletics ==
The Blevins High School mascot is the Hornet with red and white serving as its school colors.

For 2012-14, the Blevins Hornets compete in the 2A Region 7 East Conference under the administration of the Arkansas Activities Association (AAA). Interscholastic activities include basketball (boys/girls), golf (boys/girls), baseball, softball, and track (boys/girls).
