= Tom Hughes (outfielder) =

American baseball player (1907–1989)

- Outfielder
- Born: August 6, 1907; Emmet, Arkansas
- Died: August 10, 1989 (aged 82); Beaumont, Texas
- Batted: Left Threw: Right

MLB debut
- September 9, 1930, for the Detroit Tigers

Last MLB appearance
- September 28, 1930, for the Detroit Tigers

MLB statistics
- Batting average: .373
- Home runs: 0
- Runs batted in: 5
- Stats at Baseball Reference

Teams
- Detroit Tigers (1930)

Thomas Franklin Hughes (August 6, 1907 – August 10, 1989) was a reserve outfielder in Major League Baseball, playing mainly at center field for the Detroit Tigers during the 1930 season. Listed at 6 ft 1 in (1.85 m), 190 lb., Hughes batted left-handed and threw right-handed. A native of Emmet, Arkansas, he attended University of Texas at Austin.

In his one-season career, Hughes was a .373 hitter (22-for-59) in 17 games, including eight runs, two doubles, three triples, and a .413 on-base percentage.

Hughes died in Beaumont, Texas, at the age of 82.
