= Emmet School District =

Defunct school district in Arkansas, United States

Location
- Emmet, Arkansas; United States

District information
- Closed: July 1, 2004

Emmet School District was a school district based in Emmet, Arkansas.

It was administratively divided between an elementary school and a high school.

On July 1, 2004, it consolidated into the Blevins School District.
