= Ephesus Cemetery =

Historic cemetery in Arkansas, United States

- U.S. National Register of Historic Places
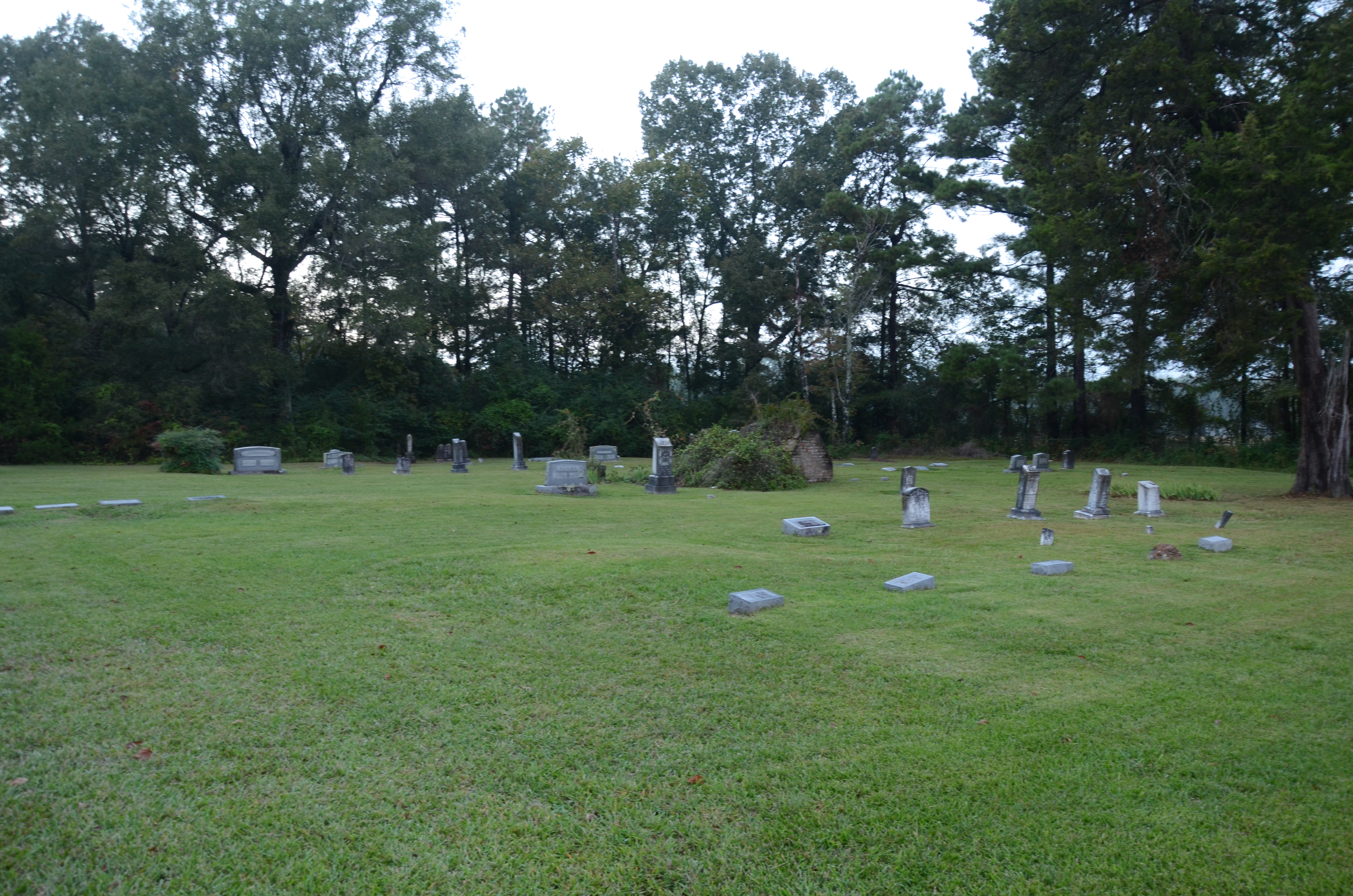

- Location within Arkansas Location within the United States
- Nearest city: Emmet, Arkansas, U.S.
- Coordinates: 33°44′20″N 93°28′01″W
- Area: less than one acre
- Built: 1876
- NRHP reference No.: 08001340
- Added to NRHP: January 22, 2009

Ephesus Cemetery is a historic cemetery just north of Emmet, Arkansas, on United States Route 67. The cemetery was listed on the National Register of Historic Places in 2009.

== History ==
The cemetery was formed for the burial of members and families of the Ephesus Primitive Baptist Church, which was organized in 1860. There are approximately 90 graves within the cemetery, with the majority interred during the 19th century. The last two surviving members of the church were buried in 2008 and no other burials have taken place since.

== Notable burials ==
- W. T. Byrd (dates unknown) -- Confederate soldier
- Benjamin Luke Landers (1828-1905) -- Preacher for the Ephesus Primitive Baptist Church in 1874
- Benjamin Young Landers (1895-1923) -- Served in the U.S. Army during World War I; killed in action
- Charlie A. Landers (1863-1948) -- Mayor of Emmet from 1910 to 1912; hotel owner
- John L. McGough (1847-1884) -- Early settler, sawmill owner/operator, Justice of the Peace
- William Young (1833-1910) -- Early settler from Holbeach, England

== See also ==
- National Register of Historic Places listings in Nevada County, Arkansas
