= Saratoga School District =

Defunct school district in Arkansas, United States

Saratoga School District No. 11 was a school district headquartered in Saratoga, Arkansas. The mascot was the bulldog.

The former Washington School District was dissolved on July 1, 1990, with some of its territory given to the Saratoga school district. On July 1, 2004, the Saratoga district consolidated into the Mineral Springs School District.
