= Blevins School District =

School district in Arkansas, United States

Address
- 5954 North Highway 29 Blevins, Arkansas, 71825; United States

District information
- Type: Public
- Grades: PreK–12
- NCES District ID: 0503300

Students and staff
- Students: 477
- Teachers: 40.53
- Staff: 46.62
- Student–teacher ratio: 11.77

Other information
- Website: www.blevinshornets.org

Blevins School District is a school district based in Blevins, Arkansas.

The district encompasses 231.65 square miles (600.0 km^{2}) of land primarily in Hempstead County and portions of Nevada County.

The Washington School District was dissolved on July 1, 1990. A portion of its territory was given to the Blevins district. On July 1, 2004, the Emmet School District consolidated into the Blevins School District.

== Schools ==
- Blevins Elementary School, serving prekindergarten through grade 6.
- Blevins High School, serving grades 7 through 12.
