= Fulton, Arkansas =

- Town
- Town of Fulton
- Location of Fulton in Hempstead County, Arkansas.
- Coordinates: 33°36′45″N 93°48′49″W
- Country: United States
- State: Arkansas
- County: Hempstead

Area
  - Total: 0.20 sq mi (0.52 km^{2})
  - Land: 0.18 sq mi (0.46 km^{2})
  - Water: 0.019 sq mi (0.05 km^{2})
- Elevation: 259 ft (79 m)

Population (2020)
  - Total: 115
  - Estimate (2025): 111 ▼
  - Density: 645.3/sq mi (249.14/km^{2})
- Time zone: UTC-6 (Central (CST))
  - Summer (DST): UTC-5 (CDT)
- ZIP code: 71838
- Area code: 870
- FIPS code: 05-25360
- GNIS feature ID: 2406531
- Highways: U.S. Highway 67; Highway 195; Highway 355

Fulton is a town in Hempstead County, Arkansas, United States. The population was 115 at the 2020 census. It is part of the Hope Micropolitan Statistical Area. The community is named after steamboat inventor Robert Fulton.

== History ==
Located on the Southwest Trail, just north of the Great Bend of the Red River of the South at a convenient river crossing, Fulton became the gateway to Mexico, and later the Southwestern United States, as most of the pioneers who settled Mexican Texas passed through here.

== Geography ==
Fulton is located at the junction of Arkansas Highway 355 and Interstate 30 and lies on the north bank of the Red River of the South.

According to the United States Census Bureau, the city has a total area of 0.2 square miles (0.52 km^{2}), of which 0.2 square miles (0.52 km^{2}) is land and 0.04 square miles (0.10 km^{2}) (10.00%) is water.

== Demographics ==
Historical population
Census	Pop.	Note	%±
1880	374		—
1890	337		−9.9%
1900	504		49.6%
1910	647		28.4%
1920	543		−16.1%
1930	593		9.2%
1940	485		−18.2%
1950	385		−20.6%
1960	309		−19.7%
1970	323		4.5%
1980	326		0.9%
1990	269		−17.5%
2000	245		−8.9%
2010	201		−18.0%
2020	115		−42.8%
2025 (est.)	111	▼	−3.5%
U.S. Decennial Census; 2014 Estimate

=== 2020 census ===
Fulton town, Arkansas – Racial and ethnic composition Note: the US Census treats Hispanic/Latino as an ethnic category. This table excludes Latinos from the racial categories and assigns them to a separate category. Hispanics/Latinos may be of any race.
Race / Ethnicity (NH = Non-Hispanic)	Pop 2000	Pop 2010	Pop 2020	% 2000	% 2010	% 2020
White alone (NH)	134	114	49	54.69%	56.72%	42.61%
Black or African American alone (NH)	106	79	58	43.27%	39.30%	50.43%
Native American or Alaska Native alone (NH)	1	0	2	0.41%	0.00%	1.74%
Asian alone (NH)	0	0	0	0.00%	0.00%	0.00%
Native Hawaiian or Pacific Islander alone (NH)	0	0	0	0.00%	0.00%	0.00%
Other race alone (NH)	0	1	0	0.00%	0.50%	0.00%
Mixed race or Multiracial (NH)	0	3	2	0.00%	1.49%	1.74%
Hispanic or Latino (any race)	4	4	4	1.63%	1.99%	3.48%
Total	245	201	115	100.00%	100.00%	100.00%

=== 2000 census ===
As of the census of 2000, there were 245 people, 95 households, and 68 families residing in the city. The population density was 1,349.1 inhabitants per square mile (520.9/km^{2}). There were 110 housing units at an average density of 605.7 per square mile (233.9/km^{2}). The racial makeup of the city was 55.92% White, 43.27% Black or African American, 0.41% Native American, and 0.41% from two or more races. 1.63% of the population were Hispanic or Latino of any race.

There were 95 households, out of which 32.6% had children under the age of 18 living with them, 53.7% were married couples living together, 17.9% had a female householder with no husband present, and 27.4% were non-families. 25.3% of all households were made up of individuals, and 14.7% had someone living alone who was 65 years of age or older. The average household size was 2.58 and the average family size was 3.04.

In the city the population was spread out, with 25.7% under the age of 18, 14.3% from 18 to 24, 17.1% from 25 to 44, 28.6% from 45 to 64, and 14.3% who were 65 years of age or older. The median age was 39 years. For every 100 females, there were 100.8 males. For every 100 females age 18 and over, there were 85.7 males.

The median income for a household in the city was $24,583, and the median income for a family was $29,167. Males had a median income of $21,827 versus $17,656 for females. The per capita income for the city was $11,280. About 20.0% of families and 18.8% of the population were below the poverty line, including 27.1% of those under the age of eighteen and 18.2% of those 65 or over.

== Education ==
It is within the Hope School District. It operates Hope High School.

== Notable people ==
- Robert Shaw, Illinois politician, was born in Fulton
- William Shaw, Illinois state legislator, was born in Fulton.

== See also ==
- List of cities and towns in Arkansas
