= Hempstead County, Arkansas =

County in Arkansas, United States

- County
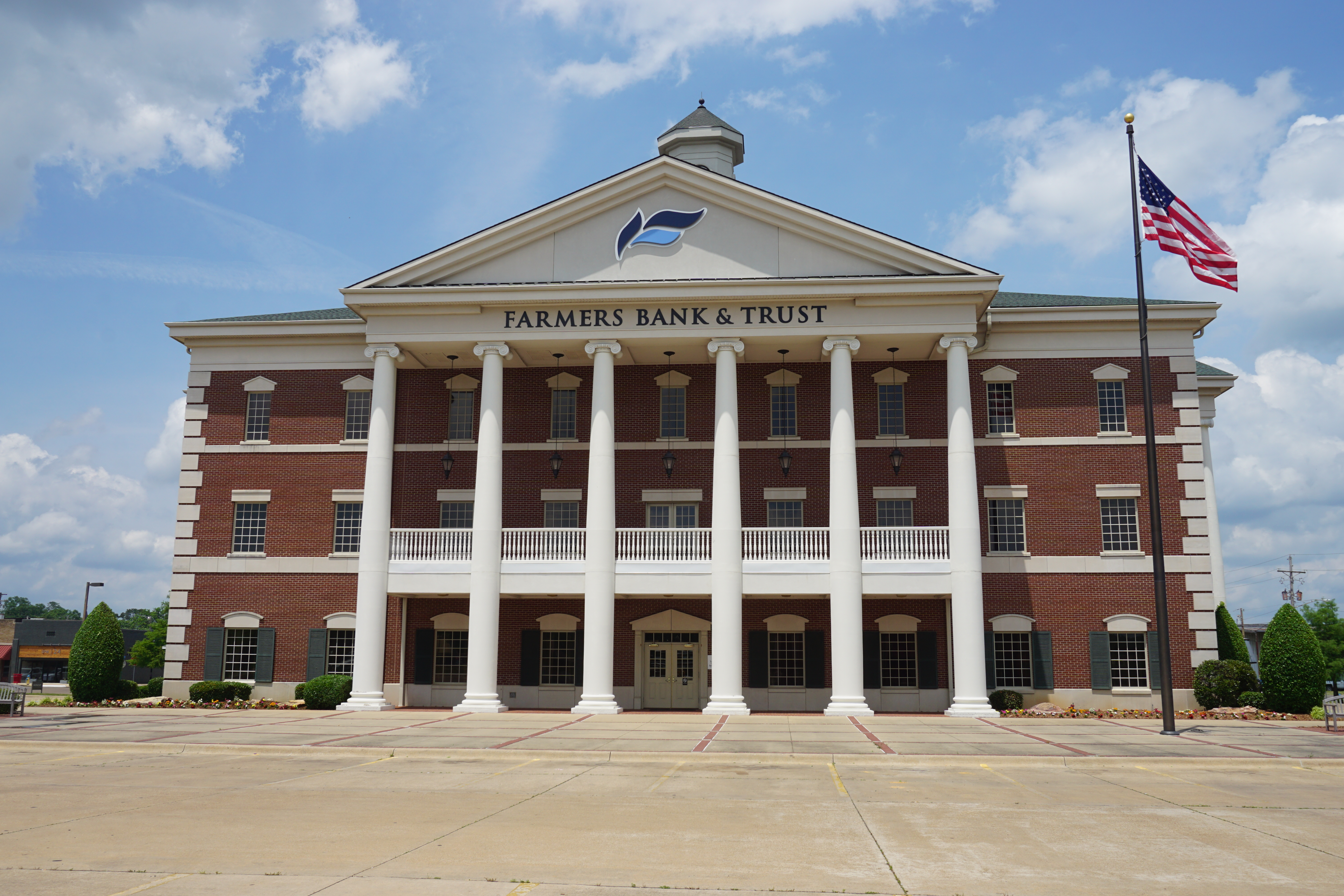
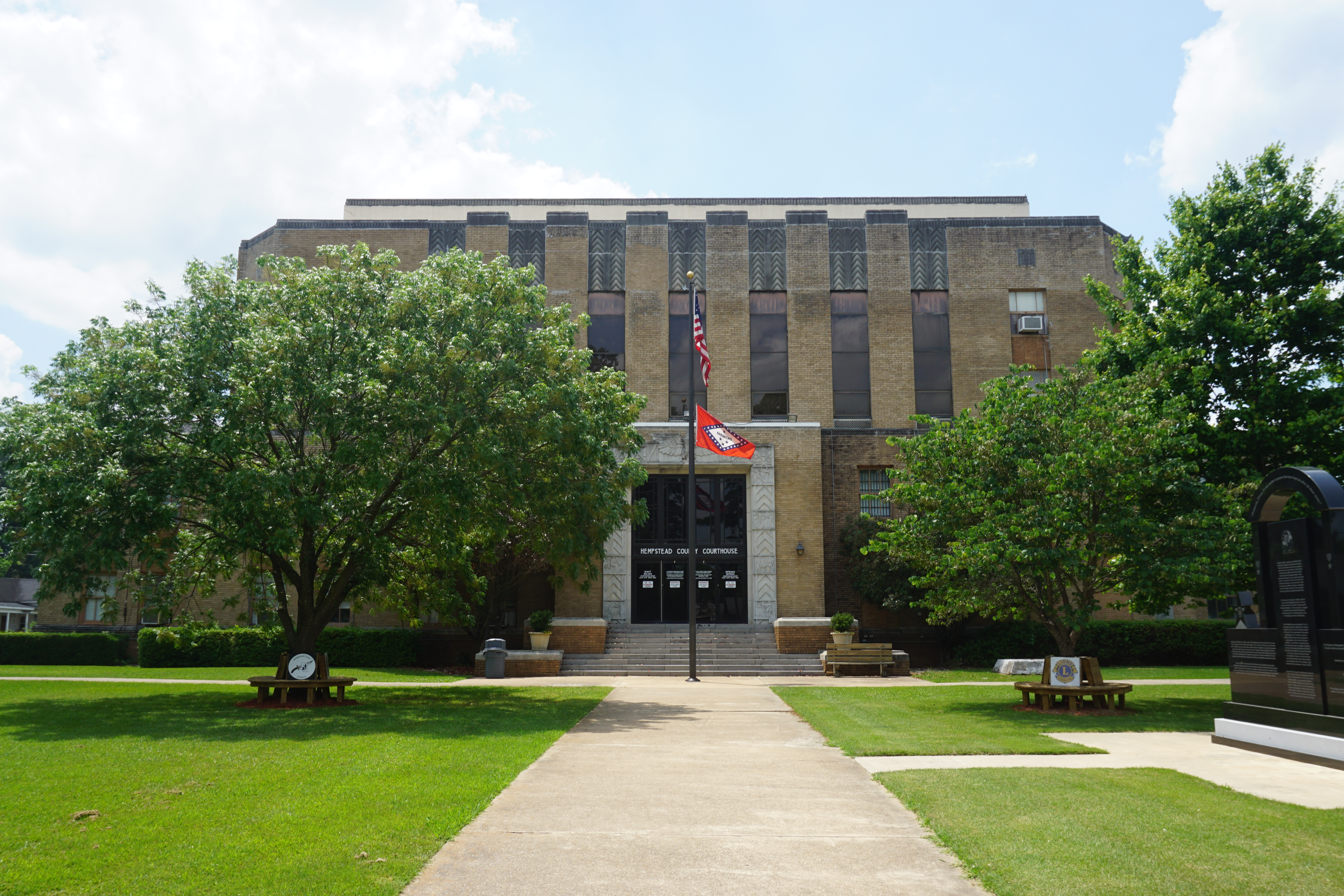
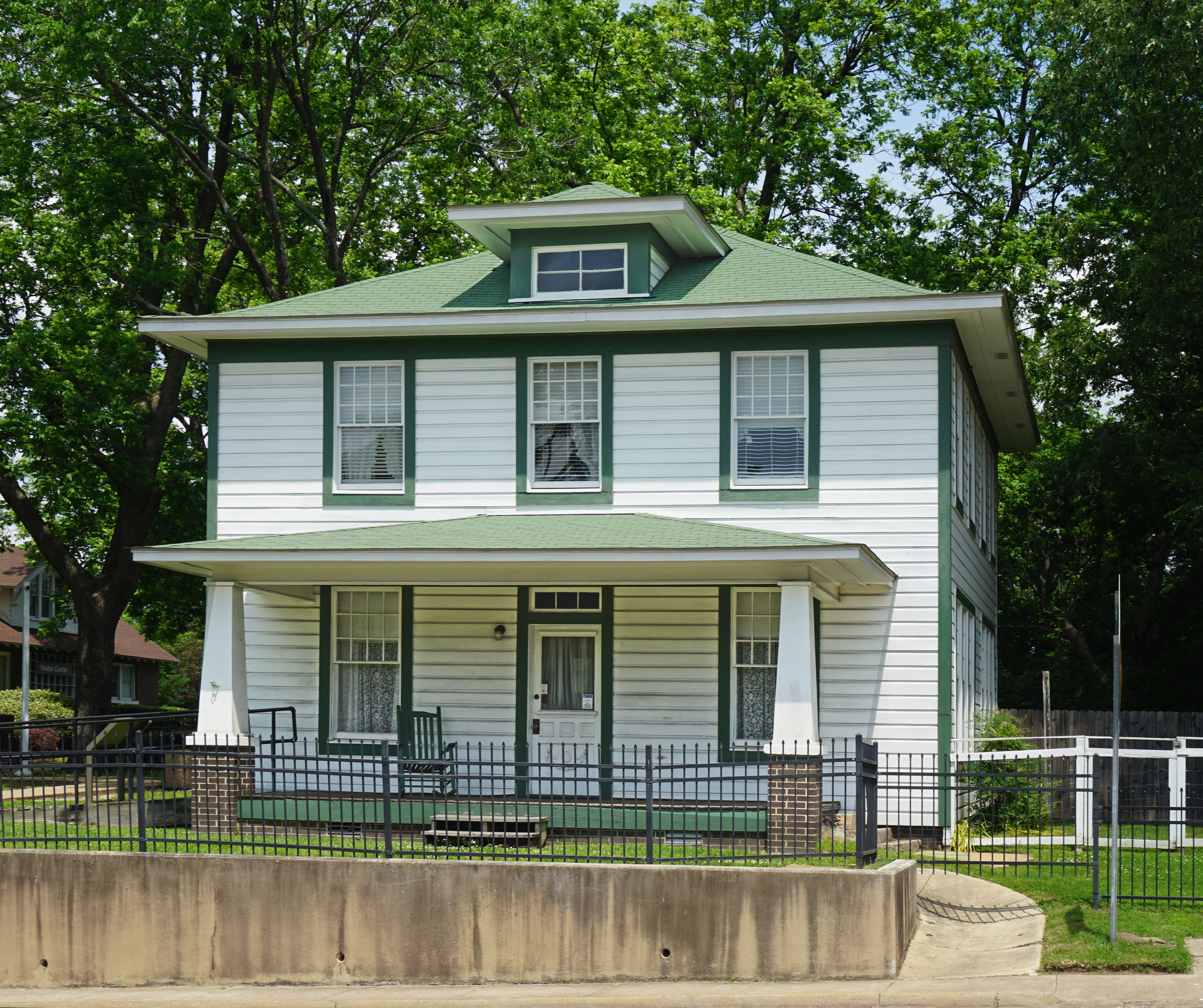
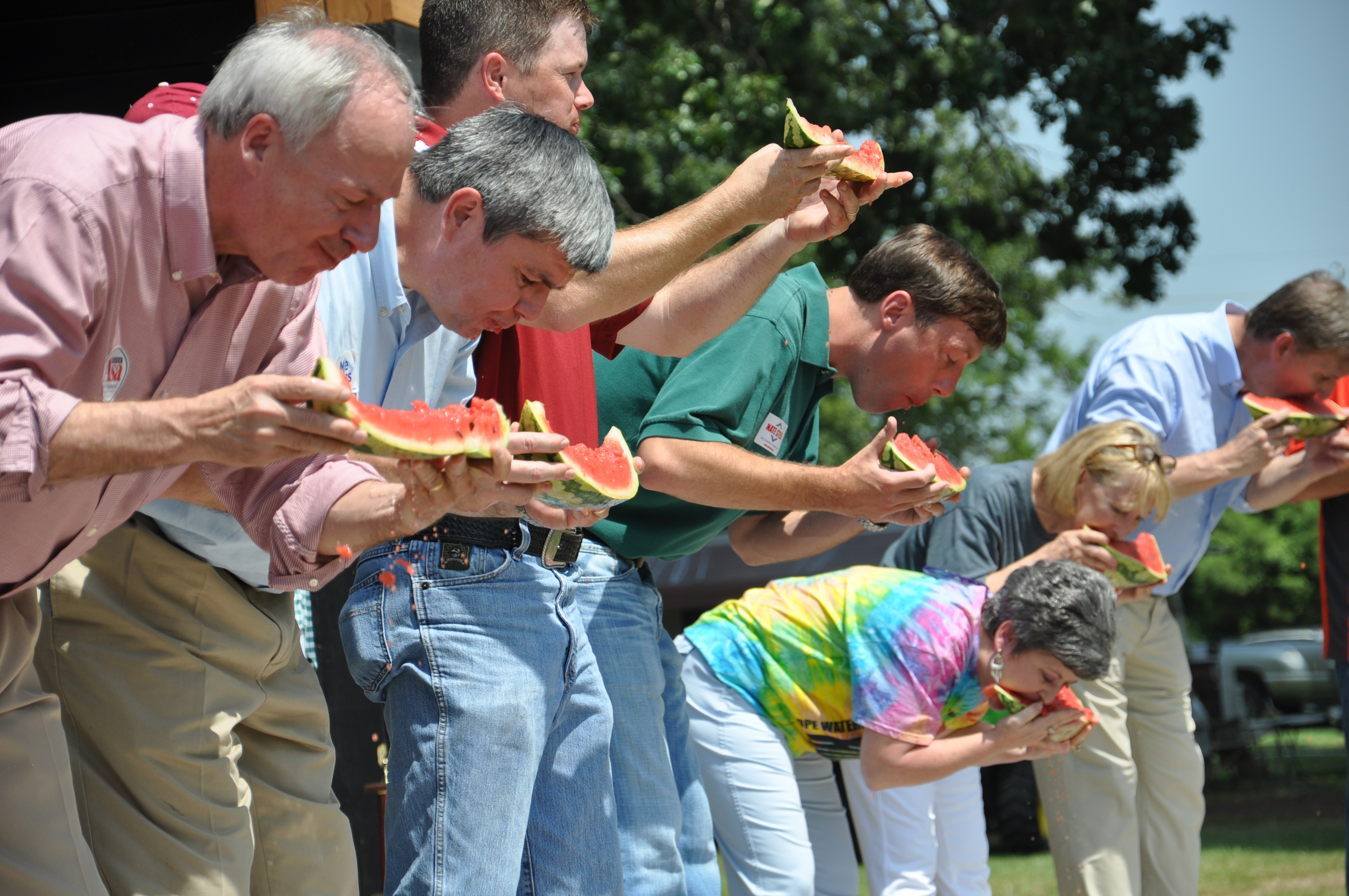
- Clockwise from top: Hempstead County Courthouse in Hope, Bill Clinton Birthplace, Politicians at the Hope Watermelon Festival, the former Hempstead County Courthouse

- Location within the U.S. state of Arkansas
- Coordinates: 33°44′07″N 93°40′06″W
- Country: United States
- State: Arkansas
- Founded: December 15, 1818
- Named for: Edward Hempstead
- Seat: Hope
- Largest city: Hope

Area
  - Total: 741 sq mi (1,920 km^{2})
  - Land: 728 sq mi (1,890 km^{2})
  - Water: 14 sq mi (36 km^{2}) 1.8%

Population (2020)
  - Total: 20,065
  - Estimate (2025): 19,080 ▼
  - Density: 27.6/sq mi (10.6/km^{2})
- Time zone: UTC−6 (Central)
  - Summer (DST): UTC−5 (CDT)
- Congressional district: 4th
- Website: hempsteadcountyar.com

Hempstead County is a county located in the U.S. state of Arkansas. As of the 2020 census, the population was 20,065, down from 22,609 at the 2010 census. The county seat is Hope. Hempstead County is Arkansas's fourth county, formed on December 15, 1818, alongside Clark and Pulaski counties. The county is named for Edward Hempstead, a delegate to the U.S. Congress from the Missouri Territory, which included present-day Arkansas at the time. It is an alcohol prohibition or dry county.

The 42nd United States President, Bill Clinton, who served from 1993 to 2001, was born in the county seat of Hope on August 19, 1946. As of 2026, Clinton is the only President to have been born in Arkansas.

== Geography ==
According to the U.S. Census Bureau, the county has a total area of 741 square miles (1,920 km^{2}), of which 728 square miles (1,890 km^{2}) is land and 14 square miles (36 km^{2}) (1.8%) is water. Hempstead County is alternately considered as part of the greater regions of South Arkansas or Southwest Arkansas.

=== Major highways ===
- Interstate 30
- U.S. Highway 67
- U.S. Highway 278
- U.S. Highway 371
- Highway 4
- Highway 27
- Highway 29
- Highway 32
- Highway 73
- Highway 174
- Highway 195
- Highway 299
- Highway 332
- Highway 353
- Highway 355

=== Adjacent counties ===
- Pike County (north)
- Nevada County (east)
- Lafayette County (south)
- Miller County (southwest)
- Little River County (west)
- Howard County (northwest)

== Demographics ==
Historical population
Census	Pop.	Note	%±
1830	2,512		—
1840	4,921		95.9%
1850	7,672		55.9%
1860	13,989		82.3%
1870	13,768		−1.6%
1880	19,015		38.1%
1890	22,796		19.9%
1900	24,101		5.7%
1910	28,285		17.4%
1920	31,602		11.7%
1930	30,847		−2.4%
1940	32,770		6.2%
1950	25,080		−23.5%
1960	19,661		−21.6%
1970	19,308		−1.8%
1980	23,635		22.4%
1990	21,621		−8.5%
2000	23,587		9.1%
2010	22,609		−4.1%
2020	20,065		−11.3%
2025 (est.)	19,080	▼	−4.9%
U.S. Decennial Census; 1790–1960 1900–1990; 1990–2000 2010–2020

=== 2020 census ===
As of the 2020 census, the county had a population of 20,065. The median age was 40.3 years. 25.1% of residents were under the age of 18 and 18.5% of residents were 65 years of age or older. For every 100 females there were 93.2 males, and for every 100 females age 18 and over there were 89.9 males age 18 and over.

The racial makeup of the county was 54.9% White, 28.3% Black or African American, 0.7% American Indian and Alaska Native, 0.5% Asian, less than 0.1% Native Hawaiian and Pacific Islander, 8.9% from some other race, and 6.7% from two or more races. Hispanic or Latino residents of any race comprised 14.7% of the population.

44.1% of residents lived in urban areas, while 55.9% lived in rural areas.

There were 7,992 households in the county, of which 31.6% had children under the age of 18 living in them. Of all households, 43.2% were married-couple households, 19.0% were households with a male householder and no spouse or partner present, and 32.2% were households with a female householder and no spouse or partner present. About 29.5% of all households were made up of individuals and 13.1% had someone living alone who was 65 years of age or older.

There were 9,601 housing units, of which 16.8% were vacant. Among occupied housing units, 67.3% were owner-occupied and 32.7% were renter-occupied. The homeowner vacancy rate was 1.9% and the rental vacancy rate was 12.2%.

=== 2000 census ===
As of the 2000 census, there were 23,587 people, 8,959 households, and 6,378 families residing in the county. The population density was 32 inhabitants per square mile (12/km^{2}). There were 10,178 housing units at an average density of 14 per square mile (5.4/km^{2}). The racial makeup of the county was 63.28% White, 30.36% Black or African American, 0.42% Native American, 0.17% Asian, 0.02% Pacific Islander, 4.17% from other races, and 1.59% from two or more races. 8.25% of the population were Hispanic or Latino of any race.

There were 8,959 households, out of which 33.40% had children under the age of 18 living with them, 51.40% were married couples living together, 15.30% had a female householder with no husband present, and 28.80% were non-families. 25.50% of all households were made up of individuals, and 11.70% had someone living alone who was 65 years of age or older. The average household size was 2.60 and the average family size was 3.09.

In the county, the population was spread out, with 27.30% under the age of 18, 9.60% from 18 to 24, 27.20% from 25 to 44, 21.70% from 45 to 64, and 14.10% who were 65 years of age or older. The median age was 35 years. For every 100 females, there were 93.70 males. For every 100 females age 18 and over, there were 89.70 males.

The median income for a household in the county was $28,622, and the median income for a family was $34,082. Males had a median income of $25,830 versus $17,383 for females. The per capita income for the county was $14,103. About 16.00% of families and 20.30% of the population were below the poverty line, including 29.20% of those under age 18 and 16.70% of those age 65 or over.

== Government ==
=== Government ===
The county government is a constitutional body granted specific powers by the Constitution of Arkansas and the Arkansas Code. The quorum court is the legislative branch of the county government and controls all spending and revenue collection. Representatives are called justices of the peace and are elected from county districts every even-numbered year. The number of districts in a county vary from nine to fifteen, and district boundaries are drawn by the county election commission. The Hempstead County Quorum Court has eleven members. Presiding over quorum court meetings is the county judge, who serves as the chief operating officer of the county. The county judge is elected at-large and does not vote in quorum court business, although capable of vetoing quorum court decisions.

Hempstead County, Arkansas Elected countywide officials
Position	Officeholder	Party
County Judge	Jerry T. Crane	Republican
County Clerk	Karen Smith	Republican
Circuit Clerk	Gail Wolfengarger	Republican
Sheriff/Collector	James Singleton	Democratic
Treasurer	Judy Lee Flowers	Democratic
Assessor	Renee Gilbert	Republican
Coroner	David W. Peters	Republican

The composition of the Quorum Court following the 2024 elections is 7 Republicans and 3 Democrats, with one seat vacant due to no filings. Justices of the Peace (members) of the Quorum Court following the elections are:

- District 1: James Griffin (D) of Hope
- District 2: (seat currently Vacant)
- District 3: Doris Brown (D) of Hope
- District 4: Ed B. Darling (R) of Hope
- District 5: Victor Ford (R)
- District 6: Troy K. Lerew (R) of Hope (seat currently Vacant)
- District 7: Steve Atchley (R) of Hope
- District 8: C. David Clayton (R) of Hope
- District 9: Jessie Henry (D)
- District 10: Jay Lathrop (R) of Nashville
- District 11: B. Keith Steed (R)

Additionally, the townships of Hempstead County are entitled to elect their own respective constables, as set forth by the Constitution of Arkansas. Constables are largely of historical significance as they were used to keep the peace in rural areas when travel was more difficult. The township constables as of the 2024 elections are:

- Bodcaw: David Keith Cummings (R)
- Bois D'Arc: Maurice Henry (D)
- Deroan: Reyn Brown (R)
- Garland: Randall Hatfield (R)
- Ozan: Becky Medlen-Billings (R)
- Spring Hill: Jimmy F. Singleton (R)
- Wallaceburg: Thomas Luke Everett (R)
- Watercreek: Frankie Ingersoll (R)

=== Politics ===
Starting in 2008, voters of Hempstead County have shifted to the political right in US presidential elections. That said, the city of Hope is still very Democratic as of the 2024 election.

United States presidential election results for Hempstead County, Arkansas
Year	Republican		Democratic		Third party(ies)	
Year	No.	%	No.	%	No.	%
1896	1,203	39.26%	1,832	59.79%	29	0.95%
1900	1,330	49.11%	1,352	49.93%	26	0.96%
1904	1,477	49.41%	1,410	47.17%	102	3.41%
1908	1,346	41.68%	1,779	55.09%	104	3.22%
1912	836	31.63%	1,247	47.18%	560	21.19%
1916	1,238	37.05%	2,103	62.95%	0	0.00%
1920	1,754	43.65%	2,239	55.72%	25	0.62%
1924	715	30.37%	1,459	61.98%	180	7.65%
1928	886	30.25%	2,038	69.58%	5	0.17%
1932	317	10.03%	2,840	89.90%	2	0.06%
1936	190	7.24%	2,431	92.68%	2	0.08%
1940	415	12.85%	2,814	87.15%	0	0.00%
1944	624	22.37%	2,157	77.34%	8	0.29%
1948	386	12.58%	1,683	54.84%	1,000	32.58%
1952	2,115	43.28%	2,771	56.70%	1	0.02%
1956	2,227	44.57%	2,694	53.91%	76	1.52%
1960	1,948	40.93%	2,596	54.55%	215	4.52%
1964	2,493	42.32%	3,355	56.95%	43	0.73%
1968	1,783	24.62%	2,322	32.07%	3,136	43.31%
1972	4,963	70.80%	2,047	29.20%	0	0.00%
1976	2,859	34.63%	5,397	65.37%	0	0.00%
1980	3,852	44.65%	4,671	54.14%	105	1.22%
1984	4,904	59.31%	3,327	40.24%	37	0.45%
1988	3,938	50.49%	3,841	49.25%	20	0.26%
1992	2,387	26.75%	5,476	61.38%	1,059	11.87%
1996	2,021	26.76%	4,983	65.99%	547	7.24%
2000	3,257	44.68%	3,937	54.01%	95	1.30%
2004	3,580	48.04%	3,817	51.22%	55	0.74%
2008	4,273	58.14%	2,869	39.04%	207	2.82%
2012	4,284	61.90%	2,468	35.66%	169	2.44%
2016	4,401	62.43%	2,377	33.72%	271	3.84%
2020	4,470	65.27%	2,138	31.22%	240	3.50%
2024	4,193	68.86%	1,776	29.17%	120	1.97%

== Communities ==
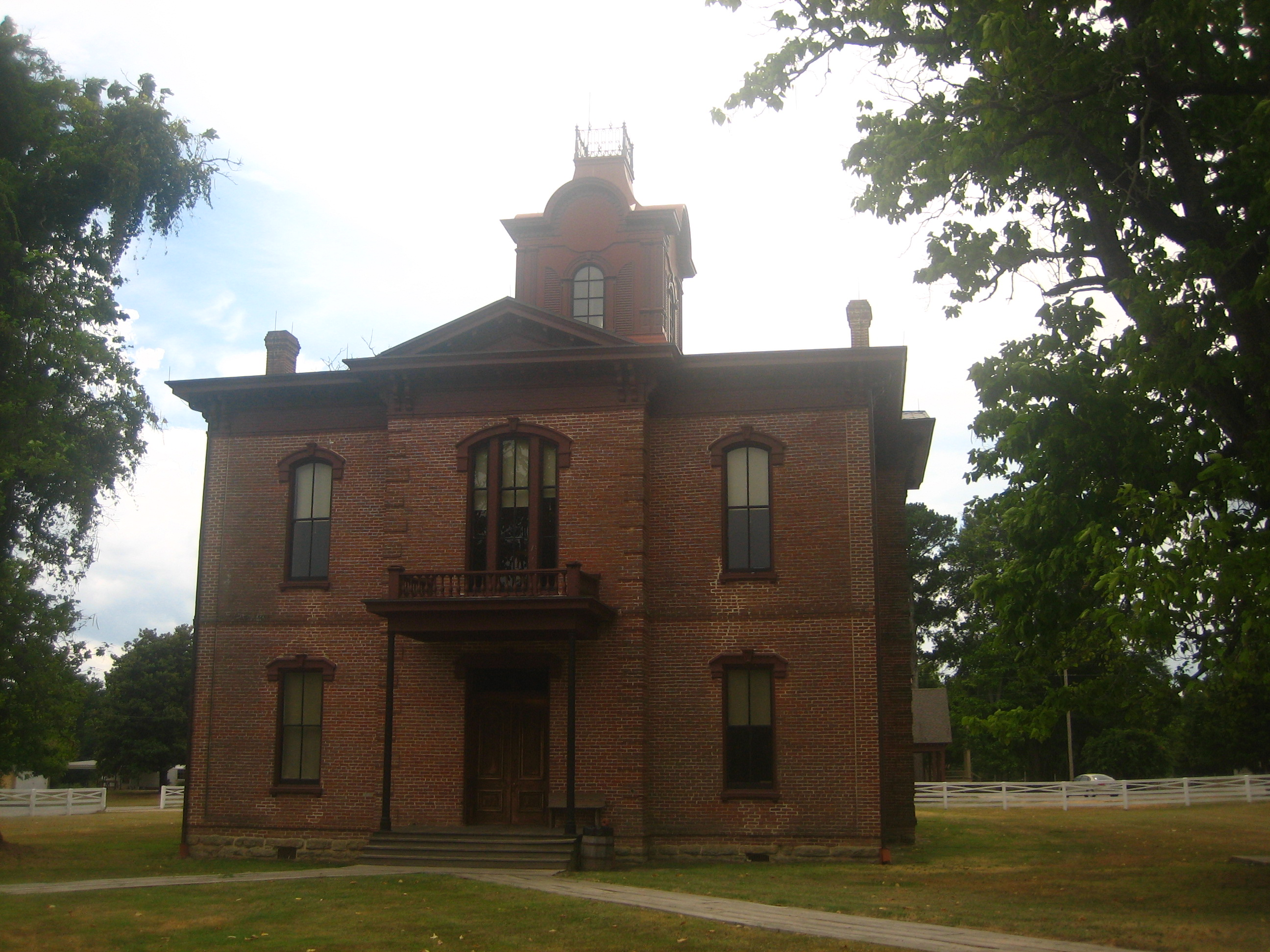
The 1874 Hempstead County Courthouse in Washington is now a visitors center for Historic Washington State Park.

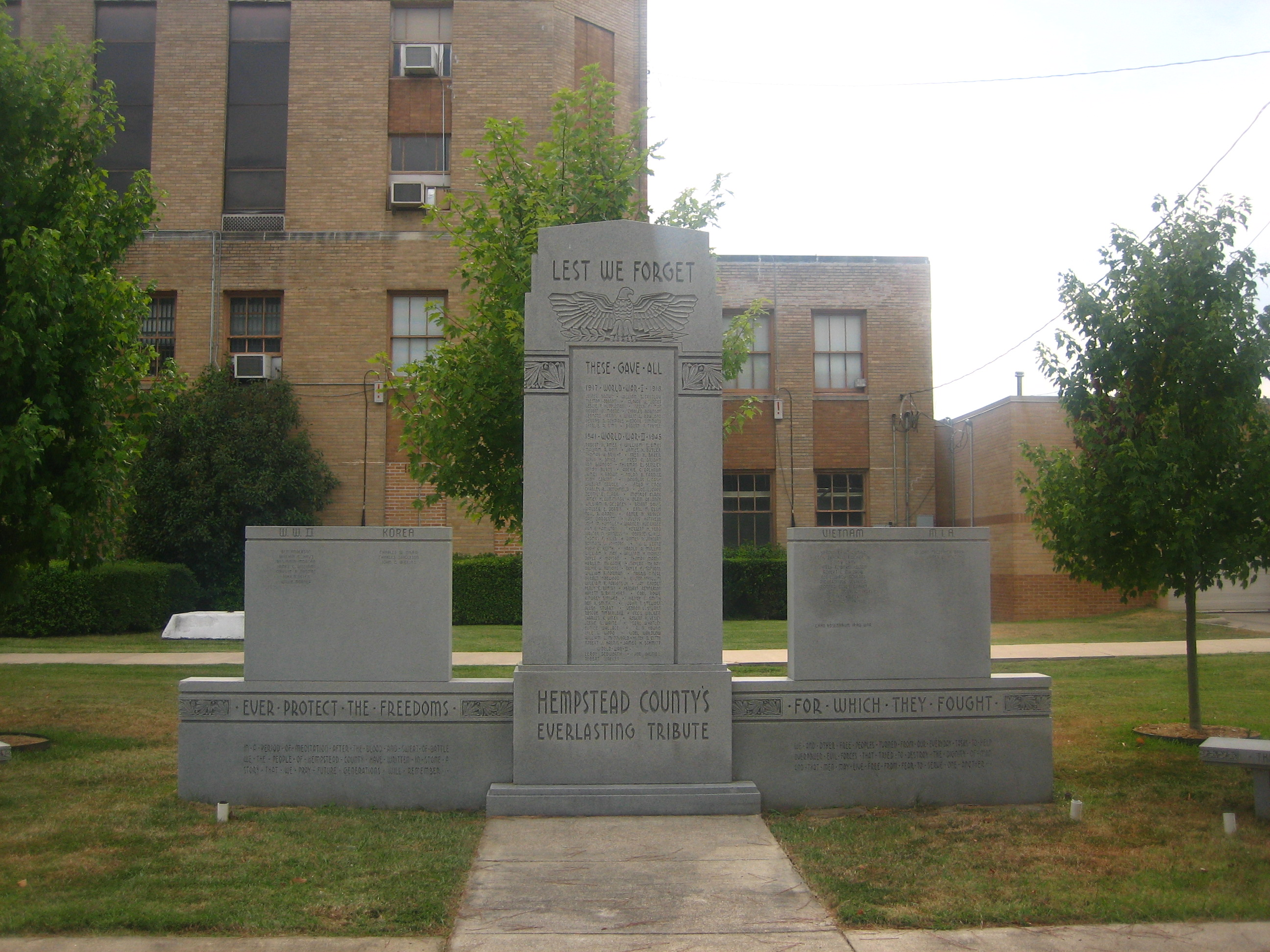
Veterans Monument in front of current 1939 Hempstead County Courthouse in Hope

=== Cities ===
- Blevins
- Hope (county seat)
- Washington

=== Towns ===
- Fulton
- McCaskill
- McNab
- Oakhaven
- Ozan
- Patmos
- Perrytown

=== Census-designated place ===
- Saratoga

=== Unincorporated communities ===
- Clow
- DeAnn

=== Townships ===
Townships in Arkansas are the divisions of a county. Each township includes unincorporated areas; some may have incorporated cities or towns within part of their boundaries. Arkansas townships have limited purposes in modern times. However, the United States census does list Arkansas population based on townships (sometimes referred to as "county subdivisions" or "minor civil divisions"). Townships are also of value for historical purposes in terms of genealogical research. Each town or city is within one or more townships in an Arkansas county based on census maps and publications. The townships of Hempstead County are listed below; listed in parentheses are the cities, towns, and/or census-designated places that are fully or partially inside the township.

- Bodcaw (Patmos)
- Bois d'Arc (Fulton, McNab)
- De Roan (Hope, Perrytown)
- Garland
- Mine Creek (part of Ozan)
- Noland (small part of Emmet)
- Ozan (Oakhaven, Washington, most of Ozan)
- Redland (McCaskill)
- Saline
- Spring Hill
- Wallaceburg (Blevins)
- Water Creek

== See also ==
- Arkadelphia Marl
- List of lakes of Hempstead County, Arkansas
- Marlbrook Marl
- National Register of Historic Places listings in Hempstead County, Arkansas
