= Hope, Arkansas =

- City
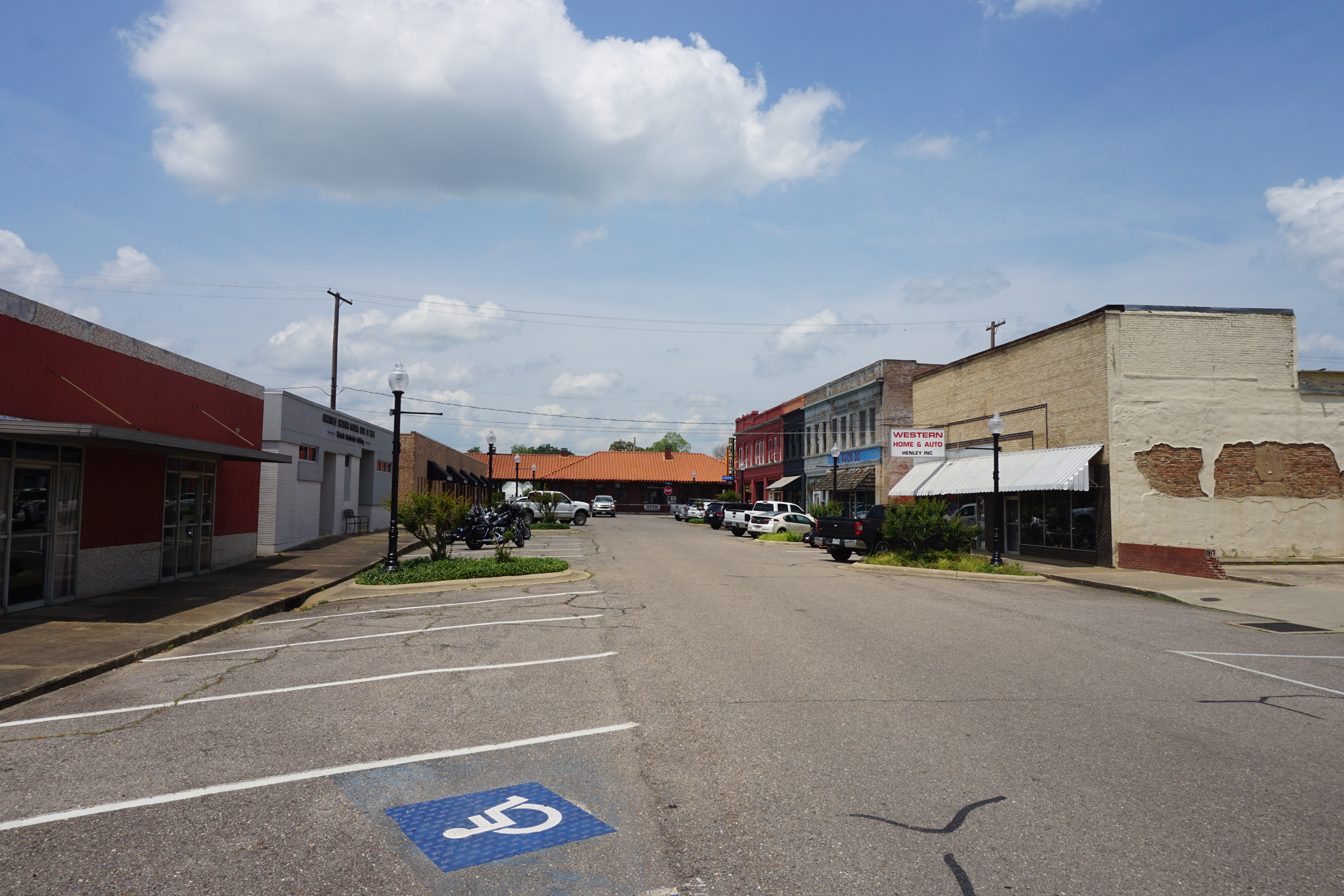
- Downtown Hope

- Seal
- Motto(s): "A Slice of the Good Life" "I still believe in a place called Hope"
- Location of Hope in Hempstead County, Arkansas

- Location within Arkansas Location within the United States
- Coordinates: 33°40′35″N 93°35′24″W
- Country: United States
- State: Arkansas
- County: Hempstead
- Founded: 1875

Government
  - Type: Council-Manager

Area
  - City: 10.76 sq mi (27.87 km^{2})
  - Land: 10.68 sq mi (27.67 km^{2})
  - Water: 0.077 sq mi (0.20 km^{2})
- Elevation: 351 ft (107 m)

Population (2020)
  - City: 8,952
  - Estimate (2025): 8,445 ▼
  - Density: 838.0/sq mi (323.55/km^{2})
  - Metro: 30,591
- Time zone: UTC-6 (CST)
  - Summer (DST): UTC-5 (CDT)
- ZIP codes: 71801-71802
- Area code: 870
- FIPS code: 05-33190
- GNIS feature ID: 2404726
- Website: www.hopear.gov

Hope is a city in Hempstead County in southwestern Arkansas, United States. Hope is the county seat and principal city of the Hope Micropolitan Statistical Area, which includes all of Hempstead and Nevada counties. As of the 2010 census the population was 10,095, and for the 2020 census, the population was 8,952.

Hope is the birthplace of three Arkansas governors: Bill Clinton (also president of the United States from 1993 to 2001), Mike Huckabee (who ran for the Republican presidential nomination in 2008 and 2016), and Sarah Huckabee Sanders (the incumbent governor and daughter of Mike Huckabee).

== History ==
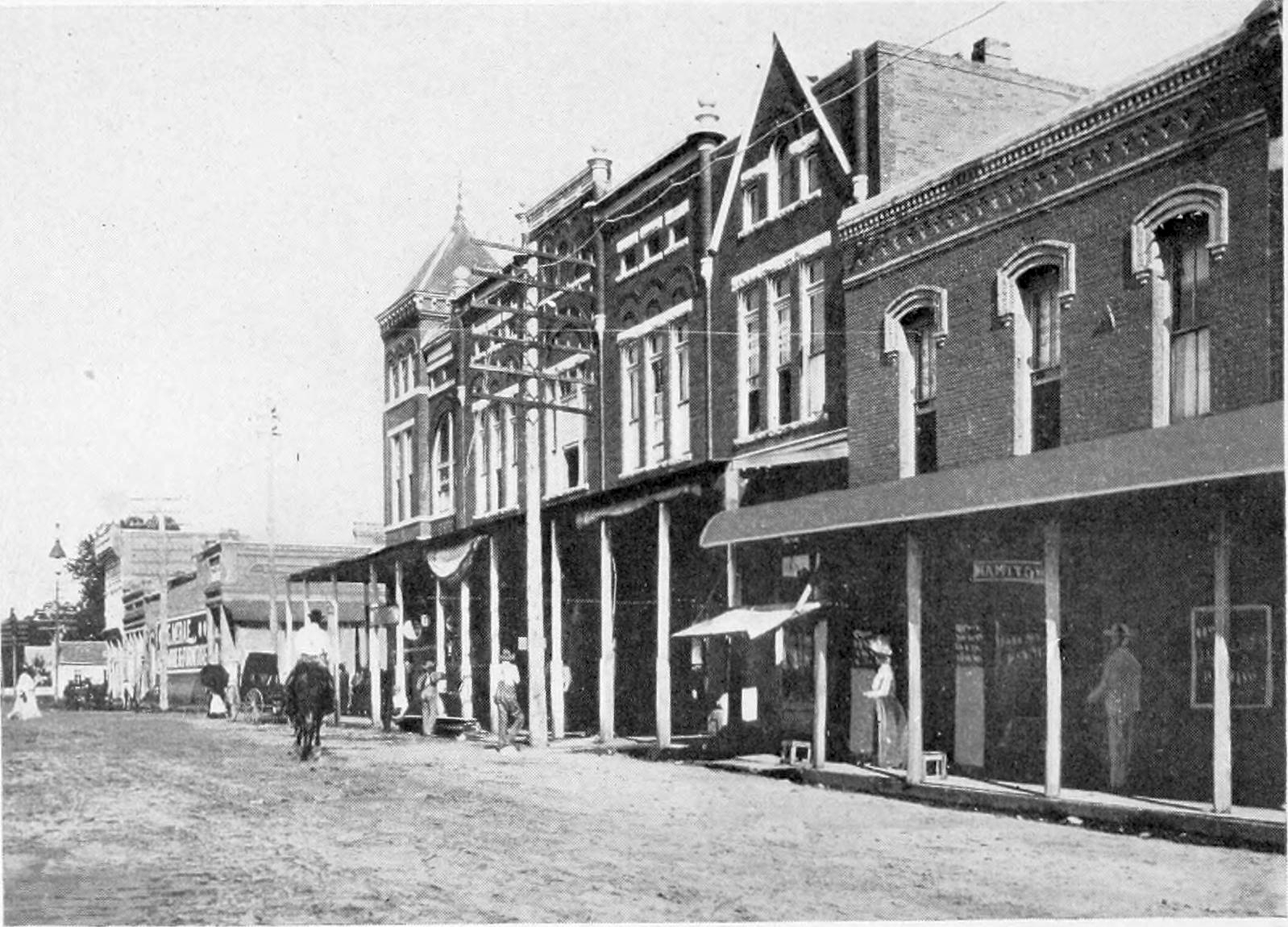
Street scene in Hope, circa 1904

Hope began in 1873, when a railroad was built through the area. The town was named for Hope Loughborough, the daughter of a railroad executive. In the 1902–1903 timeframe, the St. Louis, San Francisco and New Orleans Railroad was built into town; that line is now operated by the Kiamichi Railroad.

== Geography ==
According to the United States Census Bureau, the city has a total area of 10.2 square miles (26.3 km^{2}), of which 10.1 square miles (26.1 km^{2}) are land and 0.1 square miles (0.2 km^{2}), or 0.74%, are water.

=== Climate ===
The climate is characterized by hot, humid summers and generally mild to cool winters. According to the Köppen Climate Classification system, Hope has a humid subtropical climate, abbreviated Cfa on climate maps.

Climate data for Hope, Arkansas (1991–2020 normals, extremes 1892–present)
Month	Jan	Feb	Mar	Apr	May	Jun	Jul	Aug	Sep	Oct	Nov	Dec	Year
Record high °F (°C)	88 (31)	87 (31)	95 (35)	97 (36)	98 (37)	110 (43)	115 (46)	115 (46)	108 (42)	101 (38)	90 (32)	83 (28)	115 (46)
Mean daily maximum °F (°C)	53.3 (11.8)	57.9 (14.4)	65.8 (18.8)	73.9 (23.3)	80.8 (27.1)	88.1 (31.2)	92.1 (33.4)	92.5 (33.6)	86.4 (30.2)	76.0 (24.4)	64.2 (17.9)	55.6 (13.1)	73.9 (23.3)
Daily mean °F (°C)	42.4 (5.8)	46.2 (7.9)	53.8 (12.1)	61.6 (16.4)	70.2 (21.2)	77.7 (25.4)	81.5 (27.5)	81.0 (27.2)	74.6 (23.7)	63.2 (17.3)	52.2 (11.2)	44.6 (7.0)	62.4 (16.9)
Mean daily minimum °F (°C)	31.5 (−0.3)	34.5 (1.4)	41.7 (5.4)	49.3 (9.6)	59.5 (15.3)	67.4 (19.7)	70.9 (21.6)	69.5 (20.8)	62.7 (17.1)	50.4 (10.2)	40.3 (4.6)	33.6 (0.9)	50.9 (10.5)
Record low °F (°C)	−8 (−22)	−7 (−22)	9 (−13)	26 (−3)	35 (2)	45 (7)	53 (12)	50 (10)	34 (1)	25 (−4)	13 (−11)	2 (−17)	−8 (−22)
Average precipitation inches (mm)	4.28 (109)	4.52 (115)	5.10 (130)	5.63 (143)	5.84 (148)	4.26 (108)	3.78 (96)	3.49 (89)	3.99 (101)	4.94 (125)	4.42 (112)	5.44 (138)	55.69 (1,415)
Average snowfall inches (cm)	1.3 (3.3)	0.5 (1.3)	0.1 (0.25)	0.0 (0.0)	0.0 (0.0)	0.0 (0.0)	0.0 (0.0)	0.0 (0.0)	0.0 (0.0)	0.0 (0.0)	0.0 (0.0)	0.2 (0.51)	2.1 (5.3)
Average precipitation days (≥ 0.01 in)	10.6	9.8	10.3	9.2	9.8	8.0	7.2	6.5	6.4	7.8	9.5	9.6	104.7
Average snowy days (≥ 0.1 in)	0.3	0.4	0.1	0.0	0.0	0.0	0.0	0.0	0.0	0.0	0.0	0.2	1.0
Source: NOAA

== Demographics ==
Historical population
Census	Pop.	Note	%±
1880	1,233		—
1890	1,937		57.1%
1900	1,644		−15.1%
1910	3,639		121.4%
1920	4,790		31.6%
1930	6,008		25.4%
1940	7,475		24.4%
1950	8,605		15.1%
1960	8,399		−2.4%
1970	8,830		5.1%
1980	10,290		16.5%
1990	9,643		−6.3%
2000	10,616		10.1%
2010	10,095		−4.9%
2020	8,952		−11.3%
2025 (est.)	8,445	▼	−5.7%
U.S. Decennial Census

=== Racial and ethnic composition ===
Hope city, Arkansas – Racial and ethnic composition Note: the US Census treats Hispanic/Latino as an ethnic category. This table excludes Latinos from the racial categories and assigns them to a separate category. Hispanics/Latinos may be of any race.
Race / Ethnicity (NH = Non-Hispanic)	Pop 2000	Pop 2010	Pop 2020	% 2000	% 2010	% 2020
White alone (NH)	4,433	3,437	2,530	41.76%	34.05%	28.26%
Black or African American alone (NH)	4,555	4,359	3,950	42.91%	43.18%	44.12%
Native American or Alaska Native alone (NH)	28	23	25	0.26%	0.23%	0.28%
Asian alone (NH)	32	20	25	0.30%	0.20%	0.28%
Native Hawaiian or Pacific Islander alone (NH)	2	6	4	0.02%	0.06%	0.04%
Other race alone (NH)	17	11	20	0.16%	0.11%	0.22%
Mixed race or Multiracial (NH)	118	143	281	1.11%	1.42%	3.14%
Hispanic or Latino (any race)	1,431	2,096	2,117	13.48%	20.76%	23.65%
Total	10,616	10,095	8,952	100.00%	100.00%	100.00%

=== 2020 census ===
As of the 2020 census, Hope had a population of 8,952. The median age was 34.8 years. 29.1% of residents were under the age of 18 and 14.9% of residents were 65 years of age or older. For every 100 females there were 86.6 males, and for every 100 females age 18 and over there were 79.9 males age 18 and over.

94.7% of residents lived in urban areas, while 5.3% lived in rural areas.

There were 3,441 households and 2,447 families in Hope, of which 35.8% had children under the age of 18 living in them. Of all households, 31.8% were married-couple households, 18.9% were households with a male householder and no spouse or partner present, and 42.8% were households with a female householder and no spouse or partner present. About 32.7% of all households were made up of individuals and 13.1% had someone living alone who was 65 years of age or older.

There were 4,108 housing units, of which 16.2% were vacant. The homeowner vacancy rate was 2.2% and the rental vacancy rate was 12.6%.

=== 2010 census ===
As of the 2010 United States census, there were 10,095 people living in the city. The racial makeup of the city was 43.2% Black, 34.0% White, 0.2% Native American, 0.2% Asian, 0.1% Pacific Islander, 0.1% from some other race and 1.4% from two or more races. 20.8% were Hispanic or Latino of any race.

=== 2000 census ===
As of the census of 2000, there were 10,616 people, 3,961 households, and 2,638 families living in the city. The population density was 1,061.9 inhabitants per square mile (410.0/km^{2}). There were 4,301 housing units at an average density of 430.2 per square mile (166.1/km^{2}). The racial makeup of the city was 47.71% White, 43.17% Black or African American, 0.38% Native American, 0.30% Asian, 0.03% Pacific Islander, 6.63% from other races, and 1.78% from two or more races. 13.48% of the population were Hispanic or Latino of any race.

There were 3,961 households, out of which 34.3% had children under the age of 18 living with them, 40.8% were married couples living together, 21.0% had a female householder with no husband present, and 33.4% were non-families. Of 3,961 households, 192 are unmarried partner households: 175 heterosexual. 29.3% of all households were made up of individuals, and 13.8% had someone living alone who was 65 years of age or older. The average household size was 2.61 and the average family size was 3.20.

In the city, the population was spread out, with 28.9% under the age of 18, 10.8% from 18 to 24, 27.3% from 25 to 44, 18.4% from 45 to 64, and 14.6% who were 65 years of age or older. The median age was 32 years. For every 100 females, there were 87.3 males. For every 100 females age 18 and over, there were 81.7 males.

The median income for a household in the city was $25,385, and the median income for a family was $28,445. Males had a median income of $23,525 versus $17,394 for females. The per capita income for the city was $12,783. About 22.3% of families and 27.2% of the population were below the poverty line, including 41.1% of those under age 18 and 17.3% of those age 65 or over.

== Economy ==
Hope is also known for growing watermelons and continues to produce records for the largest specimens in the world. The last record was set by Lloyd Bright in 2005 with a 268.8-pound watermelon. The Watermelon Festival is celebrated annually from Thursday-Saturday during the second week of August. The watermelon is used in the municipal logo and the Hope slogan: A Slice of the Good Life.

== Education ==
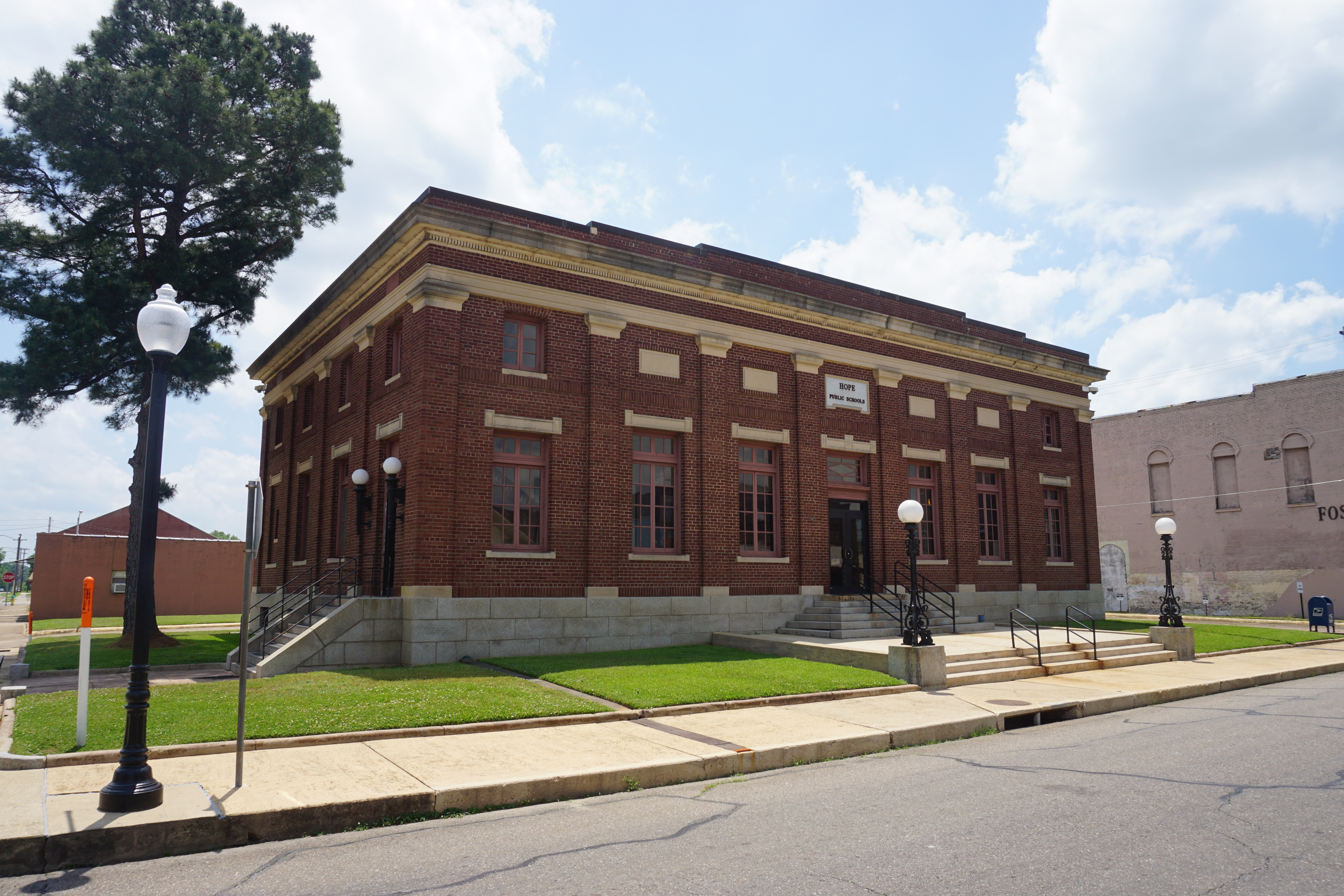
Hope Public Schools building

Public education at the elementary and secondary school level within the Hope city limits is provided by the Hope School District. Hope School District includes William Jefferson Clinton Primary School for kindergarten through fourth Grade, Beryl Henry Elementary School for fifth and sixth grade, Henry C. Yerger Middle School for seventh and eighth grade, and Hope High School for ninth through twelfth grades. Hope Academy of Public Service (HAPS) fifth through eighth grades, HAPS Freshman Academy ninth grade, HAPS Collegiate Academy tenth through twelfth grades.

Hope also has a private school, Garrett Memorial Christian School associated with Garrett Memorial Baptist Church.

Post-secondary educational opportunity is provided by the University of Arkansas at Hope.

The Spring Hill School District, while having a Hope postal address, is based outside of the city limits.

== Media ==
Hope has three forms of local media. SWARK.Today and HopePrescott serve as the city's two Social Media News websites. HopePrescott also produces the city's newspaper. There are also at least three local radio stations in and around Hope. The city is served by local television stations from the Little Rock, Arkansas, Shreveport, Louisiana and Texarkana, Texas Ark-La-Tex markets. There are currently no local TV stations for Hope.

== Infrastructure ==
=== Airport ===
Hope Municipal Airport is located on property that was once part of the Southwestern Proving Ground, one of six major military facilities in Arkansas during World War II.

At the time of its construction, the airport held claim of having the third longest runway in the United States. From 1942 to 1945 the airport and surrounding 50,078-acre Southwestern Proving Ground were used by the U.S. Army to test small arms ammunition, 20 to 155 mm projectiles, mortars, rockets, grenades, and up to 500-pound bombs. The City of Hope received the airport facility in 1947.

In the aftermath of Hurricane Katrina in 2005, FEMA used land near the airport as a staging area for manufactured homes intended as temporary housing for the hurricane victims; however, as of 2009, infrastructure and property damage remained so severe in the hurricane's path that many homes remained at the airport, eliciting criticism of the federal agency.

=== Rail service ===
In October 2009, Amtrak added Hope to its timetable brochure for its Texas Eagle service. It began on April 4, 2013. The Texas Eagle travels daily in each direction between Chicago and San Antonio.

== Notable people ==
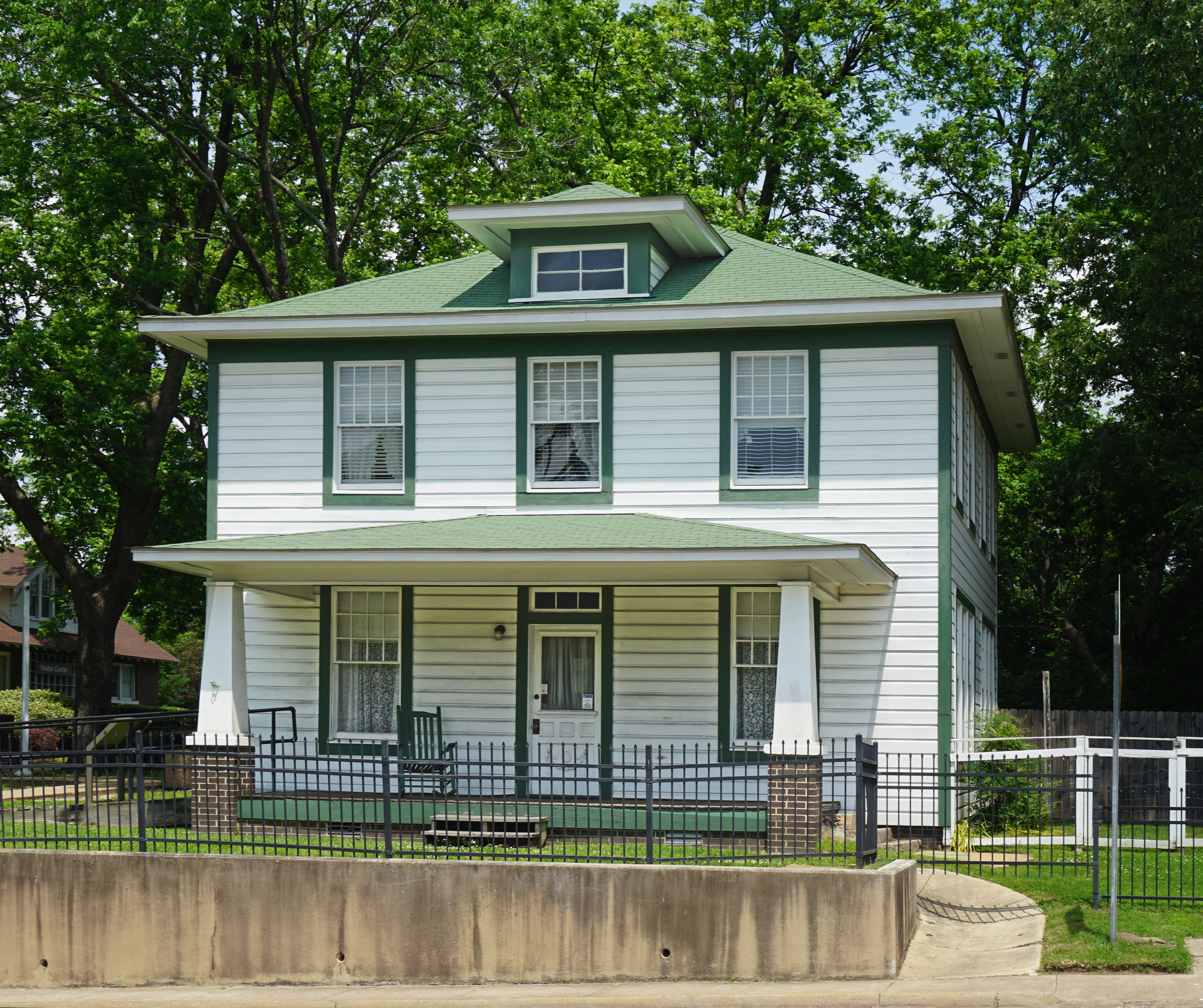
Clinton's birthplace home in Hope.

- Hope is the hometown of former U.S. president Bill Clinton, whose childhood home is located in the town. At the 1992 Democratic National Convention in New York City, then-governor Clinton ended his acceptance speech by saying, "I still believe in a place called Hope." The city adopted this statement as its unofficial motto. The city converted its railroad depot to a museum about Clinton's life.
- Hope is also the hometown of the former governor and 2008 and 2016 presidential candidate Mike Huckabee alongside his daughter current governor Sarah Huckabee Sanders
- Navy SEAL and CIA Contractor Jeremy Wise
- 20th-century congressman Tilman Bacon Parks
- Former U.S. Congressman Joseph Barton Elam of Louisiana's 4th congressional district
- former White House chief of staff Mack McLarty
- Attorney Vince Foster
- California Secretary of State Shirley Weber
- Former Arkansas secretary of state Kelly Bryant
- Former Louisville, Kentucky mayor David L. Armstrong
- Talk radio host Gary Dee
- PGA golfer Ken Duke
- Actress/vocalist Ketty Lester
- Actress Melinda Dillon
- Paul Klipsch founded Klipsch and Associates in Hope in 1946. Klipsch invented the world-famous Klipschorn speaker, a folded horn loaded speaker that revolutionized the industry. The Klipschorn and a number of other speaker lines are still manufactured in Hope by Klipsch Audio Technologies
- Former U.S. representative Mike Ross of Arkansas's 4th congressional district is a former resident of Hope.
