= List of high schools in Arkansas =

This is a list of high schools in the state of Arkansas.

All schools are comprehensive public high schools unless otherwise denoted as a charter school, magnet school, private school, or residential boarding school.

== Arkansas County ==
- DeWitt High School, DeWitt
- Stuttgart High School, Stuttgart

== Ashley County ==
- Crossett High School, Crossett
- Hamburg High School, Hamburg

== Baxter County ==
- Cotter High School, Cotter
- Norfork High School, Norfork
- Mountain Home High School, Mountain Home

== Benton County ==
- Decatur High School, Decatur
- Gravette High School, Gravette
- Pea Ridge High School, Pea Ridge
- Siloam Springs High School, Siloam Springs

=== Bentonville ===
- Bentonville High School
- Bentonville West High School

=== Gentry ===
- Gentry High School
- Ozark Adventist Academy (private, residential)

=== Rogers ===
- Arkansas Arts Academy High School (charter)
- Rogers High School
- Rogers Heritage High School
- Rogers New Technology High School

== Boone County ==
- Alpena High School, Alpena
- Bergman High School, Bergman
- Harrison High School, Harrison
- Lead Hill High School, Lead Hill
- Omaha High School, Omaha
- Valley Springs High School, Valley Springs

== Bradley County ==
- Hermitage High School, Hermitage
- Warren High School, Warren

== Calhoun County ==
- Hampton High School, Hampton

== Carroll County ==
- Berryville High School, Berryville
- Green Forest High School, Green Forest

=== Eureka Springs ===
- Clear Spring School (private)
- Eureka Springs High School

== Chicot County ==
- Dermott High School, Dermott
- Lakeside High School, Lake Village

== Clark County ==
- Arkadelphia High School, Arkadelphia
- Gurdon High School, Gurdon

== Clay County ==
- Corning High School, Corning
- Piggott High School, Piggott
- Rector High School, Rector

== Cleburne County ==
- Concord High School, Concord
- Heber Springs High School, Heber Springs
- Quitman High School, Quitman
- West Side High School, Greers Ferry

== Cleveland County ==
=== Rison ===
- Rison High School
- Woodlawn High School

== Columbia County ==
- Emerson High School, Emerson
- Magnolia High School, Magnolia
- Taylor High School, Taylor

== Conway County ==
- Nemo Vista High School, Center Ridge
- Wonderview High School, Hattieville

=== Morrilton ===
- Morrilton High School
- Sacred Heart High School (private)

== Craighead County ==
- Bay High School, Bay
- Brookland High School, Brookland
- Buffalo Island Central High School, Monette
- Riverside High School, Lake City

=== Jonesboro ===
- Jonesboro High School
- Nettleton High School
- Ridgefield Christian School (private)
- Valley View High School
- Westside High School

== Crawford County ==
- Alma High School, Alma
- Cedarville High School, Cedarville
- Mountainburg High School, Mountainburg
- Mulberry High School, Mulberry
- Van Buren High School, Van Buren

== Crittenden County ==
- Earle High School, Earle
- Marion High School, Marion

=== West Memphis ===
- Academies of West Memphis
- West Memphis Christian School (private)

== Cross County ==
- Cross County High School, Cherry Valley
- Wynne High School, Wynne

== Dallas County ==
- Fordyce High School, Fordyce

== Desha County ==
- Dumas High School, Dumas
- McGehee High School, McGehee

== Drew County ==
=== Monticello ===
- Drew Central High School
- Monticello High School
- Monticello Vocational Center

== Faulkner County ==
- Greenbrier High School, Greenbrier
- Guy–Perkins High School, Guy
- Mayflower High School, Mayflower
- Mount Vernon–Enola High School, Mount Vernon
- Vilonia High School, Vilonia

=== Conway ===
- Conway Christian High School (private)
- Conway High School
- St. Joseph High School (private)

== Franklin County ==
- Charleston High School, Charleston
- County Line High School, Branch
- Ozark High School, Ozark

== Fulton County ==
- Mammoth Spring High School, Mammoth Spring
- Salem High School, Salem
- Viola High School, Viola

== Garland County ==
- Jessieville High School, Jessieville
- Lake Hamilton High School, Pearcy
- Mountain Pine High School, Mountain Pine

=== Hot Springs ===
- Arkansas School for Mathematics, Sciences, and the Arts (magnet, residential)
- Cutter–Morning Star High School
- Fountain Lake High School
- Hot Springs High School (magnet)
- Lakeside High School

== Grant County ==
- Poyen High School, Poyen
- Sheridan High School, Sheridan

== Greene County ==
- Marmaduke High School, Marmaduke

=== Paragould ===
- Crowley's Ridge Academy (private)
- Greene County Tech High School
- Paragould High School

== Hempstead County ==
- Blevins High School, Blevins

=== Hope ===
- Hope High School
- Spring Hill High School

== Hot Spring County ==
- Bismarck High School, Bismarck
- Ouachita High School, Donaldson

=== Malvern ===
- Glen Rose High School
- Magnet Cove High School
- Malvern High School

== Howard County ==
- Dierks High School, Dierks
- Mineral Springs High School, Mineral Springs
- Nashville High School, Nashville
- Umpire High School, Umpire

== Independence County ==
- Batesville High School, Batesville
- Cedar Ridge High School, Newark
- Midland High School, Pleasant Plains
- Southside Charter High School, Southside

== Izard County ==
- Calico Rock High School, Calico Rock
- Izard County Consolidated High School, Brockwell
- Melbourne High School, Melbourne

== Jackson County ==
- Newport High School, Newport
- Tuckerman High School, Tuckerman

== Jefferson County ==
- White Hall High School, White Hall

=== Pine Bluff ===
- Dollarway High School
- Pine Bluff High School
- Ridgway Christian School
- Watson Chapel High School

== Johnson County ==
- Clarksville High School, Clarksville
- Lamar High School, Lamar
- Oark High School, Oark
- Westside High School, Coal Hill

== Lafayette County ==
- Bradley High School, Bradley
- Lafayette County High School, Stamps

== Lawrence County ==
- Hoxie High School, Hoxie
- Hillcrest High School, Strawberry
- Sloan–Hendrix High School, Imboden
- Walnut Ridge High School, Walnut Ridge

== Lee County ==
- Lee High School, Marianna

== Lincoln County ==
- Star City High School, Star City

== Little River County ==
- Ashdown High School, Ashdown
- Foreman High School, Foreman

== Logan County ==
- Booneville High School, Booneville
- J. D. Leftwich High School, Magazine
- Paris High School, Paris
- Scranton High School, Scranton
- Subiaco Academy, Subiaco (private, residential)

== Lonoke County ==
- Carlisle High School, Carlisle
- England High School, England
- Lonoke High School, Lonoke

=== Cabot ===
- Cabot Freshman Academy
- Cabot High School

== Madison County ==
- Huntsville High School, Huntsville
- Kingston High School, Kingston
- St. Paul High School, St. Paul

== Marion County ==
- Flippin High School, Flippin
- Yellville–Summit High School, Yellville

== Miller County ==
- Fouke High School, Fouke

=== Texarkana ===
- Arkansas High School (magnet)
- Genoa Central High School
- Trinity Christian High School (private)

== Mississippi County ==
- Armorel High School, Armorel
- Gosnell High School, Gosnell
- Manila High School, Manila
- Osceola High School, Osceola
- Rivercrest High School, Wilson

=== Blytheville ===
- Blytheville High School
- KIPP Blytheville

== Monroe County ==
- Brinkley High School, Brinkley
- Clarendon High School, Clarendon

== Montgomery County ==
- Caddo Hills High School, Norman
- Mount Ida High School, Mount Ida
- Oden High School, Oden

== Nevada County ==
- Nevada High School, Rosston
- Prescott High School, Prescott

== Newton County ==
- Deer High School, Deer
- Jasper High School, Jasper
- Mount Judea High School, Mount Judea
- Ozark Mountain High School, Western Grove

== Ouachita County ==
- Bearden High School, Bearden

=== Camden ===
- Camden Fairview High School
- Harmony Grove High School

== Perry County ==
- Bigelow High School, Bigelow
- Perryville High School, Perryville

== Phillips County ==
- Barton High School, Barton
- Central High School, West Helena
- KIPP: Delta Collegiate High School, Helena

=== Marvell ===
- Marvell Academy (private)
- Marvell High School

== Pike County ==
- Centerpoint High School, Amity
- Kirby High School, Kirby
- Murfreesboro High School, Murfreesboro

== Poinsett County ==
- East Poinsett County High School, Lepanto
- Harrisburg High School, Harrisburg
- Marked Tree High School, Marked Tree
- Trumann High School, Trumann

== Polk County ==
- Cossatot River High School, Cove

=== Mena ===
- Acorn High School
- Mena High School

== Pope County ==
- Atkins High School, Atkins
- Dover High School, Dover
- Hector High School, Hector
- Pottsville High School, Pottsville
- Russellville High School, Russellville

== Prairie County ==
- Des Arc High School, Des Arc
- Hazen High School, Hazen

== Pulaski County ==
=== Jacksonville ===
- Jacksonville High School
- North Pulaski High School

=== Little Rock ===
==== Public/Magnet/Charter ====
- Arkansas School for the Blind
- Arkansas School for the Deaf (residential)
- Little Rock Central High School
- Hall High School
- Joe T. Robinson High School
- LISA Academy Public Charter High School (charter)
- Metropolitan Vo-Tech High School
- Parkview Arts and Science Magnet High School (magnet)
- Wilbur D. Mills High School (magnet)
- Little Rock Southwest High School (magnet)

==== Private/Religious ====
- Catholic High School for Boys (private)
- Mount St. Mary Academy (private)
- Episcopal Collegiate School (private)
- Pulaski Academy (private)
- Little Rock Christian Academy (private)

=== Maumelle ===
- Academics Plus High Charter School (charter)
- Maumelle High School

=== North Little Rock ===
- Central Arkansas Christian Schools (private)
- North Little Rock High School

=== Sherwood ===
- LISA Academy North Public Charter High School (charter)
- Sylvan Hills High School

== Randolph County ==
- Maynard High School, Maynard
- Pocahontas High School, Pocahontas

== St. Francis County ==
- Palestine–Wheatley High School, Palestine

=== Forrest City ===
- Forrest City High School

== Saline County ==
- Bauxite High School, Bauxite

=== Benton ===
- Benton High School
- Harmony Grove High School

=== Bryant ===
- Bryant High School

== Scott County ==
- Mansfield High School, Mansfield
- Waldron High School, Waldron

== Searcy County ==
- Marshall High School, Marshall
- North Central Vocational Center, Leslie
- St. Joe High School, St. Joe

== Sebastian County ==
- Greenwood High School, Greenwood
- Hackett High School, Hackett
- Hartford High School, Hartford
- Lavaca High School, Lavaca

=== Fort Smith ===
- Northside High School
- Southside High School
- Union Christian Academy (private)

== Sevier County ==
- De Queen High School, De Queen
- Horatio High School, Horatio

== Sharp County ==
- Cave City High School, Cave City
- Highland High School, Hardy

== Stone County ==
- Mountain View High School, Mountain View
- Rural Special High School, Fox
- Timbo High School, Timbo

== Union County ==
- Junction City High School, Junction City
- Smackover High School, Smackover
- Strong High School, Strong

=== El Dorado ===
- El Dorado High School
- Parkers Chapel High School

== Van Buren County ==
- Clinton High School, Clinton
- Shirley High School, Shirley
- South Side High School, Bee Branch

== Washington County ==
- Elkins High School, Elkins
- Farmington High School, Farmington
- Greenland High School, Greenland
- Lincoln High School, Lincoln
- Prairie Grove High School, Prairie Grove
- West Fork High School, West Fork

=== Fayetteville ===
- Fayetteville High School
- Haas Hall Academy (charter)

=== Springdale ===
- Har-Ber High School
- Shiloh Christian School (private)
- Springdale High School

== White County ==
- Bald Knob High School, Bald Knob
- Bradford High School, Bradford
- Pangburn High School, Pangburn
- Rose Bud High School, Rose Bud
- White County Central High School, Judsonia

=== Beebe ===
- Beebe High School
- Lighthouse Christian Academy

=== Searcy ===
- Harding Academy (private)
- Riverview High School
- Searcy High School

== Woodruff County ==
- Augusta High School, Augusta
- McCrory High School, McCrory

== Yell County ==
- Danville High School, Danville
- Dardanelle High School, Dardanelle
- Two Rivers High School, Plainview
- Western Yell County High School, Havana

== Defunct schools ==
- Gillett High School, Gillett (merged with DeWitt)
- Humphrey High School, Humphrey (merged with DeWitt)
- St. Joseph Catholic High School (private)
- Black Rock High School, Black Rock
- Grady High School, Grady
- Bruno–Pyatt High School, Everton
- Stephens High School, Stephens
- Weiner High School, Weiner
- Delight High School, Delight
- Van–Cove High School, Cove
- Wickes High School, Wickes
- J. A. Fair Systems Magnet High School (magnet)
- McClellan Magnet High School (magnet)
- Oak Grove High School
- Hughes High School, Hughes
- Paron High School, Paron
- Lockesburg High School, Lockesburg
- Williford High School, Williford
- Norphlet High School, Norphlet

== See also ==
- List of school districts in Arkansas
- Arkansas Activities Association
