= Arkansas Activities Association =

American high school sports sanctioning body

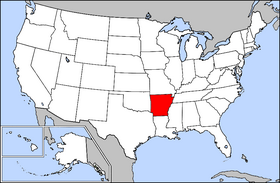
- Abbreviation: AAA
- Formation: 1904
- Legal status: Association
- Purpose: Athletic/Educational
- Headquarters: 3920 Richards Rd. North Little Rock, AR 72117
- Region served: Arkansas
- Members: 300+ schools
- Executive Director: Lance Taylor
- Affiliations: National Federation of State High School Associations
- Staff: 14
- Website: www.ahsaa.org
- Remarks: (501) 955-2500

The Arkansas Activities Association (AAA) is the primary sanctioning body for high school sports in the U.S. state of Arkansas. AAA is a member association of the National Federation of State High School Associations (NFHS). Every public secondary school in Arkansas is a de jure member of the AAA, and most private schools, save for a few schools in the delta that belong to the Mississippi Private Schools Association and 22 Christian schools who belong to the Heartland Christian Athletic Association, are included in membership.

The Arkansas Activities Association, or "AAA," was founded in 1904 by seven high schools and colleges and was called the "Arkansas State Athletic Association." In 1912, the high schools separated from the colleges and became the "Arkansas Athletics Association." Membership increased rapidly, and eventually the name of the organization was changed to the "Arkansas Activities Association".

The following member organizations exist within AAA:

- Athletic Directors: Arkansas High School Athletic Administrators Association (AHSAAA)
- Coaches: Arkansas High School Coaches Association (AHSCA)
- Officials: Arkansas Officials Association (AOA)

== History ==
Prior to integration of public schools, the AAA only governed the activities of white schools. Until 1961, the association required special permission before an integrated school could compete with an all-white school, even in band. The first AAA-sanctioned meeting between a predominantly white school and a black school occurred October 28, 1966 between Little Rock Central High School and Little Horace Mann. Some integrated schools were admitted to the AAA by 1966, and all of the African-American schools were admitted to the AAA in 1967, but maintained separate districts. This resulted in a situation in which all-black Stuttgart Holman was to play partially integrated Pine Bluff Southeast, which had been admitted to the AAA in 1966, for the African-American championship. The AAA refused to allow the title game to take place, because Holman was not a member of the association. In 1968 the districts were realigned to include black and white schools in the same districts.

== Sanctioned sports ==
The AAA currently governs a total of 12 sports:

=== Fall ===
- Bowling (Boys/Girls)
- Cheer / Dance (Girls/Co-Ed)
- Cross Country (Boys/Girls)
- Football
- Golf (Boys/Girls)
- Volleyball (Girls)

=== Winter ===
- Basketball (Boys/Girls)
- Swimming and diving (Boys/Girls)
- Wrestling (Boys/Girls)

=== Spring ===
- Baseball (Boys)
- Soccer (Boys/Girls)
- Softball (Girls)
- Tennis (Boys/Girls)
- Track and field (Boys/Girls)

=== Other activities ===
Although the word "activities" is used in the name, the AAA is directly responsible only for interscholastic athletics. Other activities, including music, forensics, and spirit groups, are governed by their own associations affiliated with yet not part of the AAA, who is only responsible for sanctioning the events. These associations usually adopt the AAA's means of determining eligibility as well as its size classifications seen below, but regional classifications and means of organizing events are left only to their respective associations.

The AAA maintains affiliations with several non-sporting activities associations. These associations generally use AAA guidelines regarding a student's eligibility to participate.

- Arkansas Communication and Theatre Arts Association (ACTAA) — a professional non-profit organization that serves the students and teachers of Oral Communication, Debate, Forensic Activities, Theatre, and Dance in Arkansas. ACTAA is affiliated with the Arkansas District of the National Forensics League.
- Arkansas Association of Student Councils (AASC) — an organization that support student government and Student Council activities; affiliated with National Association of Student Councils (NASC).
- Arkansas Junior Science & Humanities Symposium (AR JSHS) — annual event that is designed to challenge and engage students (Grades 9-12) in science, technology, engineering or mathematics (STEM). Individual students compete for scholarships and recognition by presenting the results of their original research efforts before a panel of judges and an audience of their peers.
- Arkansas School Band and Orchestra Association (ASBOA) — supports students and educators with competitions in a variety of marching band, jazz band, and orchestra.
- Arkansas Scholastic Press Association (ASPA) & Arkansas Journalism Advisors Association (AJAA) — provides students and educators with resources, competitions and programs focused on yearbook, newspaper, photography and digital media.
- Arkansas Governor's Quiz Bowl Association (AGQBA): The statewide governing body for quiz bowl in the state.
- Arkansas FFA — chartered in 1928 and serves as state organization within the National FFA Organization.

== Organization ==
The AAA organizes its member schools by 3-year average daily membership (ADM) in grades 10-12 every two years. Each classification is organized by rank, as opposed to a minimum threshold, to maintain consistent numbers for each class.

=== Classifications ===
Since 2006, the schools have been organized as follows:

- Class 7A (16 largest schools)
- Class 6A (next 16 largest schools)
- Class 5A (next 32 largest schools)
- Class 4A (next 48 largest schools that sponsor football ("football schools"), as well as all non-football schools within range)
- Class 3A (next 48 largest schools that sponsor football ("football schools"), as well as all non-football schools within range)
- Class 2A (next 48 largest schools and remainder of football schools)
- Class 1A (all remaining schools)

The means of placing private schools within these classifications have become a key issue in Arkansas. Prior to 2002, only single-gender schools would have its enrollment altered, in this case by doubling the reported enrollment. In 2002, the enrollments reported by private schools was multiplied by 1.35. In 2006, that multiplier was increased to 1.75. Starting in 2008, the multiplier will be dropped altogether, and each private school will be placed one classification above where the enrollment would otherwise place the school. In 2012, enrollment for private schools that were segregated were combined (for example, Catholic High School for Boys with Mount Saint Mary Academy (for Girls)).

Within each classification, the schools are further grouped into conferences, each with 6-8 schools apiece. In Classes 7A-5A, the conferences are named according to directional region (i.e. 7A-West, 6A-Central, 5A-Southeast). In the smaller classes, the conferences are named according to the activity district number which the conference is centrally located (a class 4A conference in western Arkansas would be the 4A-4 conference). In smaller classes, there can be more than one conference within an activity district. These are further named according to directional area (a pair of class 2A conferences in southwest Arkansas would be the 2A-7 West and 2A-7 East). Classes 3A and 2A group conferences for football and basketball separately (Mountainburg is in Conference 3A-1 for football and 3A-4 for basketball). Finally, sports with limited sponsorship, such as soccer and swimming, have their own conferences between the participants. These special conferences often transcend multiple classes.

From 2010 to 2016, the rules for 7A and 6A classification for football were changed. The divisions still compete in separate playoffs, but two regional conferences that have previously been exclusive to 7A or 6A now have a mix of 7A and 6A schools so as to save on transportation expenses during the regular season.

=== Conferences ===
For purposes of clarity, the activity districts with regions covered are as follows.

- District 1 (northwest Arkansas)
- District 2 (north central Arkansas)
- District 3 (northeast Arkansas)
- District 4 (west Arkansas)
- District 5 (central Arkansas)
- District 6 (east Arkansas)
- District 7 (southwest Arkansas)
- District 8 (southeast Arkansas)

The AAA has changed both the names and means of these classifications over time.

- Prior to 1977, the classes ranged from Class AAAA to Class C, with AAAA including the 8 largest schools in Arkansas. In 1977, the first "class shift" added an "A" to each class, and references to Class C were removed.
- In 1983, Class AAAAA merged into and was renamed Class AAAA, with all other classes relatively consistent.
- In 1998, the state witnessed the second "class shift", this time removing all references to Class B.
- In 2006, Class AAAAA was split in half, and Classes AAA and AA, both with over 70 schools each, were reorganized into three smaller classes. At first, the largest class was called Class AAAAAAA. The current naming conventions, changing the reference to 7A, were adopted soon after.

Prior to 2006, the activity district number was placed in front of the class for conference names (i.e. 4AAA, 7AA-East). These naming conventions changed as well, but many local media outlets still placed the district number before the class (3-4A instead of 4A-3). Prior to this, a few outlets mixed prior references to new ones (some newspapers in western Arkansas made references to the 4AAA-West, yet such a conference never existed).

=== Class 7A ===
The following conferences exist within the 7A classification for the 2016–18 school years:

Central

- Bryant Hornets
- Cabot Panthers
- Catholic Rockets / Mt. St. Mary's Belles
- Little Rock Central Tigers
- Conway Wampus Cats
- North Little Rock Charging Wildcats
- Fort Smith Northside Grizzlies
- Fort Smith Southside Mavericks

West

- Bentonville Tigers
- Bentonville West Wolverines
- Fayetteville Purple Bulldogs
- Har-Ber Wildcats
- Heritage War Eagles
- Rogers Mountaineers
- Springdale Bulldogs
- Van Buren Pointers

=== Class 6A ===
The following conferences exist within the 6A classification for the 2016–18 school years:

East

- Jacksonville Titans
- Jonesboro Golden Hurricanes
- Little Rock Hall Warriors
- Marion Patriots
- Mountain Home Bombers
- Pine Bluff Zebras
- Searcy Lions
- West Memphis Blue Devils

West

- Benton Panthers
- El Dorado Wildcats
- Greenwood Bulldogs
- Lake Hamilton Wolves
- Russellville Cyclones
- Sheridan Yellowjackets
- Siloam Springs Panthers
- (Texarkana) Arkansas Razorbacks

=== Class 5A ===
The following conferences exist within the 5A classification for the 2016–18 school years:

East

- Batesville Pioneers
- Blytheville Chickasaws
- Forrest City Mustangs
- Greene County Tech Golden Eagles
- Nettleton Raiders
- Paragould Rams
- Valley View Blazers
- Wynne Yellowjackets

West

- Alma Airedales
- Clarksville Panthers
- Farmington Cardinals
- Greenbrier Panthers
- Harrison Golden Goblins
- Maumelle Hornets
- Morrilton Devil Dogs
- Vilonia Eagles

Central

- Beebe Badgers
- J. A. Fair War Eagles
- Little Rock Christian Warriors
- McClellan Crimson Lions
- Mills Comets
- Little Rock Parkview Patriots
- Pulaski Academy Bruins
- Sylvan Hills Bears

South

- Camden Fairview Cardinals
- De Queen Leopards
- Hope Bobcats
- Hot Springs Trojans
- Hot Springs Lakeside Rams
- Magnolia Panthers
- Watson Chapel Wildcats
- White Hall Bulldogs

=== Class 4A ===
The following conferences exist within the 4A classification for the 2016–18 school years:

Region 1

- Berryville Bobcats
- Gentry Pioneers
- Gravette Lions
- Huntsville Eagles
- Lincoln Wolves
- Pea Ridge Blackhawks
- Prairie Grove Tigers
- Shiloh Christian Saints

Region 2

- Arkansas Baptist Eagles
- Central Arkansas Christian Mustangs
- E-Stem Mets (BB)
- Heber Springs Panthers
- Helena-West Helena Central Cougars
- Lonoke Jackrabbits
- Riverview Raiders
- Southside–Batesville Southerners
- Stuttgart Ricebirds

Region 3

- Brookland Bearcats
- Cave City Cavemen
- Gosnell Pirates
- Harrisburg Hornets
- Highland Rebels
- Pocahontas Redskins
- Trumann Wildcats
- Jonesboro Westside Warriors

Region 4

- Booneville Bearcats
- Dardanelle Sand Lizards
- Dover Pirates
- Ozark Hillbillies
- Pottsville Apaches
- Subiaco Academy Trojans
- Waldron Bulldogs
- West Fork Tigers

Region 7

- Arkadelphia Badgers
- Ashdown Panthers
- Bauxite Miners
- Fountain Lake Cobras
- Malvern Leopards
- Mena Bearcats
- Nashville Scrappers
- Joe T. Robinson Senators

Region 8

- Crossett Eagles
- DeWitt Dragons
- Dollarway Cardinals
- Dumas Bobcats
- Hamburg Lions
- Monticello Billies
- Star City Bulldogs
- Warren Lumberjacks

=== Class 3A ===
The conference membership within the 3A Classification are adjusted for schools that do not field a football team. The following conferences exist within the 3A classification for the 2016–18 school years:

==== Football ====
Region 1

- Clinton Yellowjackets
- Elkins Elks
- Green Forest Tigers
- Greenland Pirates
- Marshall Bobcats
- Melbourne Bearkatz
- Mountain View Yellowjackets
- Yellville–Summit Panthers

Region 2

- Bald Knob Bulldogs
- Barton Bears
- Cedar Ridge Timberwolves
- Episcopal Collegiate Wildcats
- Harding Academy Wildcats
- Lee Trojans
- Mayflower Eagles
- Rose Bud Ramblers

Region 3

- Corning Bobcats
- Hoxie Mustangs
- Manila Lions
- Newport Greyhounds
- Osceola Seminoles
- Piggott Mohawks
- Rivercrest Colts
- Walnut Ridge Bobcats

Region 4

- Atkins Red Devils
- Cedarville Pirates
- Charleston Tigers
- Lamar Warriors
- Mansfield Tigers
- Paris Eagles
- Perryville Mustangs
- Two Rivers Gators

Region 5

- Bismarck Lions
- Centerpoint Knights
- Glen Rose Beavers
- Gurdon Go-Devils
- Haskell Harmony Grove Cardinals
- Horatio Lions
- Jessieville Lions
- Prescott Curley Wolves

Region 6

- Drew Central Pirates
- Fordyce Redbugs
- Fouke Panthers
- Genoa Central Dragons
- Junction City Dragons
- Lakeside Lake Village Beavers
- McGehee Owls
- Smackover Buckaroos

==== Basketball ====
Region 1 West

- Cedarville Pirates
- Charleston Tigers
- Elkins Elks
- Greenland Pirates
- Haas Hall Mastiffs
- Mansfield Tigers

Region 1 East

- Bergman Panthers
- Clinton Yellowjackets
- Green Forest Tigers
- Marshall Bobcats
- Melbourne Bearkatz
- Mountain View Tigers
- Valley Springs Tigers
- Yellville–Summit Panthers

Region 2

- Bald Knob Bulldogs
- Barton Bears
- Cedar Ridge Timberwolves
- Harding Academy Wildcats
- KIPP: Delta Prep
- Lee Trojans
- Newport Greyhounds
- Tuckerman Bulldogs

Region 3

- Corning Bobcats
- Hoxie Mustangs
- Manila Lions
- Osceola Seminoles
- Piggott Mohawks
- Rivercrest Colts
- Riverside Rebels
- Walnut Ridge Bobcats

Region 4

- Atkins Red Devils
- Jessieville Lions
- Lamar Warriors
- Paris Eagles
- Perryville Mustangs
- Two Rivers Gators

Region 5

- Bismarck Lions
- Episcopal Collegiate Wildcats
- Glen Rose Beavers
- Haskell Harmony Grove Cardinals
- LISA Academy Jaguars
- Mayflower Eagles
- Rose Bud Ramblers

Region 7

- Centerpoint Knights
- Cossatot River Eagles
- Fouke Panthers
- Genoa Central Dragons
- Gurdon Go-Devils
- Horatio Lions
- Prescott Curley Wolves

Region 8

- Drew Central Pirates
- Fordyce Redbugs
- Junction City Dragons
- Lakeside Lake Village Beavers
- McGehee Owls
- Smackover Buckaroos

=== Class 2A ===
The conference membership within the 2A Classification are adjusted for schools that do not field a football team. The following conferences exist within the 2A classification for the 2016–18 school years:

==== Football ====
Region 3

- Cross County Thunderbirds
- Earle Bulldogs
- East Poinsett County Warriors
- KIPP: Blytheville Prep
- Midland Mustangs
- Marked Tree Indians
- Rector Cougars
- Salem Greyhounds

Region 4

- Danville Little Johns
- Decatur Bulldogs
- Hackett Hornets
- J. D. Leftwich Rattlers
- Lavaca Golden Arrows
- Mountainburg Dragons
- Western Yell County Wolverines
- Johnson County Westside Rebels

Region 5

- Bigelow Panthers
- Conway Christian Eagles
- Cutter–Morning Star Eagles
- England Lions
- Hector Wildcats
- Magnet Cove Panthers
- Poyen Indians
- Quitman Bulldogs

Region 6

- Augusta Red Devils
- Brinkley Tigers
- Carlisle Bisons
- Clarendon Lions
- Des Arc Eagles
- Hazen Hornets
- Marvell Mustangs
- McCrory Jaguars
- Palestine–Wheatley Patriots

Region 7

- Dierks Outlaws
- Foreman Gators
- Lafayette County Cougars
- Mineral Springs Hornets
- Mount Ida Lions
- Mountain Pine Red Devils
- Murfreesboro Rattlers
- Spring Hill Bears

Region 8

- Bearden Bears
- Hampton Bulldogs
- Camden Harmony Grove Hornets
- Hermitage Hustlin' Hermits
- Parkers Chapel Trojans
- Rison Wildcats
- Strong Bulldogs
- Woodlawn Bears

==== Basketball ====
Region 2

- Buffalo Island Central Mustangs
- Cotter Warriors
- East Poinsett County Warriors
- Flippin Bobcats
- Marked Tree Indians
- Marmaduke Greyhounds
- Salem Greyhounds
- Sloan–Hendrix Greyhounds

Region 3

- Augusta Red Devils
- Brinkley Tigers
- Carlisle Bisons
- Clarendon Lions
- Cross County Thunderbirds
- Des Arc Eagles
- Earle Bulldogs
- Hazen Hornets
- McCrory Jaguars
- Palestine–Wheatley Patriots

Region 4 West

- Arkansas Arts Academy
- Danville Little Johns
- Eureka Springs Highlanders
- Hackett Hornets
- J. D. Leftwich Rattlers
- Lavaca Golden Arrows
- Mountainburg Dragons
- Johnson County Westside Rebels

Region 4 East

- Bigelow Panthers
- Conway Christian Eagles
- England Lions
- Hector Wildcats
- Jacksonville Lighthouse School
- Pangburn Tigers
- Quitman Bulldogs
- St. Joseph Bulldogs
- White County Central Bears

7 West

- Blevins Hornets
- Caddo Hills Indians
- Cutter–Morning Star Eagles
- Foreman Gators
- Magnet Cove Panthers
- Mountain Pine Red Devils
- Murfreesboro Rattlers
- Poyen Indians

7 East

- Bearden Bears
- Camden Harmony Grove Hornets
- Lafayette County Cougars
- Parkers Chapel Trojans
- Rison Wildcats
- Spring Hill Bears

=== Class 1A ===
The following conferences exist within the 1A classification for the 2016–18 school years:

1 West

- County Line Indians
- Hartford Hustlers
- Mulberry Yellowjackets
- Oark Hornets
- Scranton Rockets
- St. Paul Saints
- Western Yell County Wolverines

1 Northwest

- Alpena Leopards
- Decatur Bulldogs
- Haas Hall: Bentonville
- Kingston Yellowjackets
- Lead Hill Tigers
- Omaha Eagles

1 East

- Bruno–Pyatt Patriots
- Deer Antlers
- Jasper Pirates
- Mount Judea Eagles
- St. Joe Wildcats
- Western Grove Warriors

2 North

- Calico Rock Pirates
- Hillcrest Screamin' Eagles
- Izard County Cougars
- Mammoth Spring Bears
- Norfork Panthers
- Viola Longhorns

2 South

- Bradford Eagles
- Concord Pirates
- Midland Mustangs
- Rural Special Rebels
- Shirley Blue Devils
- South Side Bee Branch Hornets
- Timbo Tigers
- Greers Ferry West Side Eagles

3 East

- Armorel Tigers
- Bay Yellowjackets
- Crowley's Ridge Academy Falcons
- KIPP: Blytheville Prep
- Maynard Tigers
- Rector Cougars
- Ridgefield Christian Warriors

5 North

- Abundant Life Owls
- Academics Plus Falcons
- Avilla Christian Academy
- Guy–Perkins Thunderbirds
- LISA Academy North Jaguars
- Marvell Mustangs
- Mount Vernon–Enola Warhawks
- Nemo Vista Red Hawks
- Sacred Heart Rebels
- Wonderview Daredevils

7 West

- Acorn Tigers
- Dierks Outlaws
- Kirby Trojans
- Mineral Springs Hornets
- Mount Ida Lions
- Oden Timberwolves
- Umpire Wildcats

7 East

- Bradley Bears
- Emerson Pirates
- Nevada Blue Jays
- Ouachita Warriors
- Taylor Tigers

8 East

- Dermott Rams
- Hampton Bulldogs
- Hermitage Hustlin' Hermits
- Sparkman Raiders
- Strong Bulldogs
- Woodlawn Bears

== State championships ==
=== Academic competitions ===
The state's Quiz Bowl competitions are organized by the Arkansas Governor's Quiz Bowl Association (AGQBA) as sanctioned by the AAA.

==== List of Arkansas state high school quiz bowl champions ====
Each spring, the Arkansas Governor's Quiz Bowl Association holds the state tournament finals for each classification. These matches are broadcast on the Arkansas Educational Television Network (AETN).

===== 7A classification =====
Year	Champion	Runner-up
2026	Fort Smith Southside (7)	ASMSA (2)
2025	ASMSA (2)	Bryant
2024	Little Rock Central (3)	Rogers Heritage
2023	Fayetteville (2)	Conway
2022	Fort Smith Southside (6)	Rogers
2021	Fort Smith Southside (5)	Bryant
2020	None due to COVID	
2019	Little Rock Central (2)	Conway
2018	Conway (3)	Fayetteville
2017	Conway (2)	Cabot
2016	Fayetteville	Conway
2015	Conway	Fort Smith Southside
2014	Fort Smith Southside (4)	Cabot
2013	Fort Smith Southside (3)	ASMSA
2012	ASMSA	Conway
2011	Cabot	Fort Smith Southside
2010	Fort Smith Southside (2)	Little Rock Central
2009	Little Rock Catholic	Fort Smith Northside
2008	Little Rock Central	Cabot
2007	Fort Smith Southside	Cabot

(Prior to 2006-2007 school year Arkansas had only five classification divisions.)

===== 6A classification =====
Year	Champion	Runner-up
2026	Russellville	Benton
2025	Russellville	Sheridan
2024	Russellville	LR Catholic
2023	Russellville	Benton
2022	Russellville	Benton
2021	Russellville	Lake Hamilton
2020	None due to COVID	
2019	Russellville	Greenwood
2018	Russellville	Greenwood
2017	Russellville	Benton
2016	Russellville	Sheridan
2015	Benton	Russellville
2014	Benton	Greenwood
2013	Searcy	Benton
2012	Benton	Little Rock Parkview
2011	Little Rock Parkview	Benton
2010	Little Rock Parkview	Watson Chapel
2009	Benton	Watson Chapel
2008	Little Rock Parkview	Benton
2007	Little Rock Parkview	Benton

(Prior to 2006-2007 school year Arkansas had only five classification divisions.)

===== 5A classification =====
Year	Champion	Runner-up
2026	Valley View	Paragould
2025	eStem	Valley View
2024	Batesville Charter	Magnolia
2023	Batesvlle	Valley View
2022	Batesvlle	Valley View
2021	Morrilton	Vilonia
2020	None due to COVID	
2019	De Queen	Morrilton
2018	Little Rock Christian	Pulaski Academy
2017	Harrison	Nettleton
2016	Little Rock Christian	Harrison
2015	Morrilton	Little Rock Christian
2014	Watson Chapel	Morrilton
2013	Watson Chapel	Little Rock Christian
2012	Watson Chapel	Huntsville
2011	Watson Chapel	Huntsville
2010	Morrilton	Little Rock Mills
2009	Morrilton	Little Rock Christian
2008	Little Rock Christian	Morrilton
2007	Morrilton	Little Rock Christian
2006	Cabot	Fort Smith Southside
2005	Benton	Fort Smith Southside
2004	Fort Smith Northside	Fort Smith Southside
2003	Benton	Little Rock Catholic
2002	Fort Smith Northside	Little Rock Catholic
2001	Fort Smith Northside	Benton
2000	Fort Smith Northside	Benton

===== 4A classification =====
Year	Champion	Runner-up
2026	Westside (Jonesboro)	Trumann
2025	Trumann	Arkadelphia
2024	Trumann	Arkadelphia
2023	Arkadelphia	Bauxite
2022	Subiaco	Berryville
2021	Monticello	Huntsville
2020	None due to COVID	
2019	Arkadelphia	Monticello
2018	Huntsville	Hamburg
2017	Huntsville	Highland
2016	Subiaco Academy	Brookland
2015	Subiaco Academy	Hamburg
2014	Arkadelphia	Maumelle
2013	Subiaco Academy	Gravette
2012	Nashville	Subiaco Academy
2011	Farmington	Subiaco Academy
2010	Malvern	Huntsville
2009	Subiaco Academy	Malvern
2008	Huntsville	Subiaco Academy
2007	Hamburg	Pocahontas
2006	Malvern	Morrilton
2005	Morrilton	Huntsville
2004	Vilonia	Morrilton
2003	Morrilton	Vilonia
2002	Morrilton	Watson Chapel
2001	Morrilton	Watson Chapel
2000	Watson Chapel	Morrilton

===== 3A classification =====
Year	Champion	Runner-up
2026	Haas Hall-Fayetteville	Haas Hall-Bentonville
2025	Haas Hall-Fayetteville	Haas Hall-Bentonville
2024	Atkins	Mountain View
2023	Mountain View	Haas Hall-Fayetteville
2022	Mountain View	Centerpoint
2021	Mountain View	Haas Hall-Fayetteville
2020	None due to COVID	
2019	Mountain View	Centerpoint
2018	Centerpoint	Haas Hall-Fayetteville
2017	Haas Hall-Fayetteville	Centerpoint
2016	Haas Hall-Fayetteville	Episcopal Collegiate
2015	Episcopal Collegiate	Centerpoint
2014	Episcopal Collegiate	Fountain Lake
2013	Episcopal Collegiate	Fountain Lake
2012	Centerpoint	Episcopal Collegiate
2011	Episcopal Collegiate	Arkansas Baptist
2010	Episcopal Collegiate	Centerpoint
2009	Episcopal Collegiate	Centerpoint
2008	Bauxite	Episcopal Collegiate
2007	Episcopal Collegiate	Salem
2006	Dardanelle	Nashville
2005	Little Rock Christian	Dardanelle
2004	Dardanelle	Pulaski Academy
2003	Dardanelle	Pulaski Academy
2002	Huntsville	Bald Knob
2001	Bald Knob	Huntsville
2000	Bald Knob	Huntsville

===== 2A classification =====
Year	Champion	Runner-up
2026	Conway Christian	Hazen
2025	Hazen	Haas Hall-Rogers
2024	Haas Hall-Bentonville	Lifeway Christian
2023	Haas Hall-Bentonville	Lifeway Christian
2022	Haas Hall-Bentonville	Lifeway Christian
2021	Haas Hall-Bentonville	Lifeway Christian
2020	None due to COVID	
2019	Haas Hall-Fayetteville	Haas Hall-Bentonville
2018	Conway Christian	Rison
2017	Conway Christian	Cotter
2016	Hazen	Conway Christian
2015	Conway Christian	Hazen
2014	Cedar Ridge	Hazen
2013	Conway Christian	Cedar Ridge
2012	Cedar Ridge	Gurdon
2011	Murfreesboro	Gurdon
2010	Murfreesboro	Magazine
2009	Melbourne	Cutter Morningstar
2008	Woodlawn	Parkers Chapel
2007	Walnut Ridge	Gillett
2006	Episcopal Collegiate	Centerpoint
2005	Walnut Ridge	Centerpoint
2004	Cutter Morningstar	Centerpoint
2003	Cutter Morningstar	Little Rock Christian
2002	Cutter Morningstar	Izard County Consolidated
2001	Centerpoint	Izard County Consolidated
2000	Centerpoint	Walnut Ridge

===== 1A classification =====
Year	Champion	Runner-up
2026	Guy-Perkins	Scranton
2025	Haas Hall-Springdale	Armorel
2024	Norfolk	Sacred Heart
2023	Norfork	Sacred Heart
2022	Haas Hall-Rogers	Norfork
2021	Haas Hall-Springdale	Haas Hall-Rogers
2020	None due to COVID	
2019	Norfork	Izard County Consolidated
2018	Haas Hall-Bentonville	Norfork
2017	Norfork	Haas Hall-Bentonville
2016	Norfork	LISA Academy North
2015	Sacred Heart	Mount Vernon-Enola
2014	Haas Hall	LISA Academy North
2013	Haas Hall	Alpena
2012	Haas Hall	eStem
2011	Norfork	Ridgefield Christian
2010	Sacred Heart	South Side Bee Branch
2009	Haas Hall	Academics Plus
2008	Haas Hall	LISA Academy
2007	Alpena	Haas Hall
2006	Van Cove	Haas Hall
2005	Scranton	Van Cove
2004	Van Cove	Lead Hill
2003	Sulphur Rock	Van Cove
2002	Armorel	Little Rock Christian
2001	Walnut Valley Christian	Delight
2000	Walnut Valley Christian	Delight

=== Fall sports ===
==== List of Arkansas state high school football champions ====
To decide a winner of each classification, each conference sends the top 4 teams within them to attend the state playoffs. All number 1 seed schools get a first round bye. The playoffs are in a single elimination tournament that decides the best teams in a classification. Rounds are played weekly until two teams remain in the tournament. The two remaining teams will play at a set location to decide the state champion in the classification. These rules for playoffs apply to football only.

==== List of Arkansas state high school volleyball champions ====
- 2026 – Fayetteville (9), Mount St. Mary (3), Brookland (7), Fountain Lake, Hackett (5)
- 2025 – Conway (4), Marion (4), Pulaski Academy, Mansfield (9), Hackett (4)
- 2024 – Conway (3), Shiloh Christian (3), Brookland (6), Paris (6), Hackett (3)
- 2023 – Fayetteville (8), Benton (3), Brookland (5), Baptist Prep (2), Mansfield (8)
- 2022 – Fayetteville (7), Benton (2), Brookland (4), Baptist Prep, Mansfield (7)
- 2021 – Fayetteville (6), Little Rock Christian, Valley View (16), Paris (5), Mansfield (6)
- 2020 – Fayetteville (5), Greenwood (3), Valley View (15), Hackett (2), Mansfield (5)
- 2019 – Bentonville (6), Jonesboro (14), Valley View (14), Episcopal Collegiate, Hackett
- 2018 – Conway (2), Jonesboro (13), Valley View (13), Paris (4), Crowley’s Ridge (7)
- 2017 – Fayetteville (4), Greenwood (2), Valley View (12), Shiloh Christian (2), Paris (3)
- 2016 – Fayetteville (3), Jonesboro (12), Valley View (11), Brookland (3), Paris (2)
- 2015 – Fayetteville (2), Marion (3), Valley View (10), Shiloh Christian, Paris
- 2014 – Bentonville (5), Russellville (4), Paragould (2) Mena, Mansfield (4)
- 2013 – FS Southside (8), Jonesboro (11), Paragould, Valley View (9), Mansfield (3)
- 2012 – Fayetteville, Russellville (3), Nettleton (3), Valley View (8), Mansfield (2)
- 2011 – Bentonville (4), Marion (2), Greenwood, Valley View (7), Harding Academy
- 2010 – Bentonville (3), Marion, Nettleton (2), Valley View (6), Crowley's Ridge Academy (6)
- 2009 – FS Southside (7), Benton, Siloam Springs (7), Jonesboro Westside (6), Mansfield
- 2008 – Bentonville (2), Jonesboro (10), Siloam Springs (6), Valley View (5), Lavaca
- 2007 – Bentonville, Lake Hamilton, Siloam Springs (5), Jonesboro Westside (5), Brookland (2)
- 2006 – FS Southside (6), Jonesboro (9), Siloam Springs (4), Valley View (4), Brookline
- 2005 – Russellville (7), Siloam Springs (3), Valley View (3)
- 2004 – FS Southside (5), Siloam Springs (2), Valley View (2)
- 2003 – FS Southside (4), Morrilton (2), Valley View
- 2002 – Jonesboro (8), Morrilton, Crowley's Ridge (5)
- 2001 – Jonesboro (7), Siloam Springs, Jonesboro Westside (4)
- 2000 – FS Southside (3), Harrison, Crowley's Ridge (4)
- 1999 – FS Southside (2), Crowley's Ridge (3)
- 1998 – Conway, Crowley's Ridge (2)
- 1997 – FS Southside, Crowley's Ridge
- 1996 – Jonesboro (6), Harrisburg (4)
- 1995 – Jonesboro (5), Harrisburg (3)
- 1994 – Jonesboro (4), Jonesboro Westside (3)
- 1993 – Mount St. Mary (2), Harrisburg (2)
- 1992 – Jonesboro (3), Jonesboro Westside (2)
- 1991 – North Little Rock, Harrisburg
- 1990 – Cabot (2), Arkadelphia (7)
- 1989 – Cabot, Arkadelphia (6)
- 1988 – Mount St. Mary, Arkadelphia (5)
- 1987 – Jonesboro (2), Nettleton
- 1986 – LR Central, Arkadelphia (4)
- 1985 – Texarkana, Arkadelphia (3)
- 1984 – West Helena Central (4), Arkadelphia (2)
- 1983 – West Helena Central (3), Jonesboro Westside
- 1982 – Russellville (2), Arkadelphia
- 1981 – Russellville, Morrilton
- 1980 – West Helena Central (2), Magnolia (2)
- 1979 – Jonesboro, Magnolia
- 1978 – West Helena Central, Ashdown
- 1977 – Sylvan Hills, Mountain Home (2)
- 1976 – Mountain Home

==== List of Arkansas state high school girls cross country champions ====
The following is a (fall sport) list of Arkansas state champions in girls cross country:

- 2026 – Bentonville, Shiloh Christian, Providence Academy, Quitman, Ouachita, Rural Special
- 2025 – Bentonville, Mountain Home, Episcopal Collegiate, Providence Academy, Quitman, Kingston
- 2024 – Rogers, Russellville, Episcopal Collegiate, Providence Academy, Quitman, Kingston
- 2023 – Rogers, Greenwood, Gravette, Episcopal Collegiate, Quitman, Kingston
- 2022 – Bentonville, Greenwood, Gravette, Episcopal Collegiate, Quitman, Kingston
- 2021 – Bentonville, Mountain Home, Valley View, Episcopal Collegiate, Quitman, Kingston
- 2020 – Bentonville, Mountain Home, Valley View, West Fork, Quitman, West Side GF
- 2019 – Bentonville, Greenwood, Harrison, Waldron, Quitman
- 2018 – Bentonville, Siloam Springs, Harrison, West Fork, Melbourne
- 2017 – Fayetteville, Siloam Springs, Little Rock Christian, Heber Springs, Genoa Central, Quitman
- 2016 – Bentonville, Siloam Springs, Little Rock Christian, Heber Springs, Genoa Central, Quitman
- 2015 – Bentonville, Siloam Springs, Little Rock Christian, Pottsville, Genoa Central, Trinity Christian
- 2014 – Bentonville, Siloam Springs, Little Rock Christian, Ozark, Genoa Central, Trinity Christian
- 2013 – Fayetteville, Lake Hamilton, Little Rock Christian, Heber Springs, Genoa Central, Acorn
- 2012 – Rogers Heritage, Lake Hamilton, Little Rock Christian, Heber Springs, Melbourne, Acorn
- 2011 – Rogers, Lake Hamilton, Siloam Springs, De Queen, Harding Academy, Acorn
- 2010 – Rogers, Van Buren, Batesville, De Queen, Rose Bud, Acorn
- 2009 – Bentonville, Mountain Home, Batesville, Shiloh Christian, Elkins, Trinity Christian
- 2008 – Bentonville, Mountain Home, Batesville, De Queen, Elkins, Des Arc
- 2007 – Rogers, Mountain Home, Batesville, Heber Springs, Green Forest, Des Arc
- 2006 – Bentonville, Lake Hamilton, Batesville, Heber Springs, Genoa Central, West Side GF
- 2005 – Rogers, Batesville, Heber Springs, Genoa Central
- 2004 – Bentonville, Batesville, Heber Springs, Harding Academy
- 2003 – Rogers, Harrison, De Queen, LR Lutheran
- 2002 – Bryant, Siloam Springs, Berryville, Harding Academy
- 2001 – Fayetteville, Siloam Springs, Berryville, Harding Academy
- 2000 – Bentonville, Harrison, Berryville, Harding Academy
- 1999 – Bentonville, Harrison, Berryville, Decatur
- 1998 – Bentonville, Harrison, Berryville, Shiloh Christian
- 1997 – Bentonville, Harrison, Berryville, Shiloh Christian
- 1996 – Fayetteville, Harrison, Eureka Springs, DeValls Bluff
- 1995 – Bryant, Harrison, Shiloh Christian
- 1994 – FS Southside, Harrison, Shiloh Christian
- 1993 – Rogers, Harrison, Glenwood
- 1992 – Rogers, Vilonia, Eureka Springs
- 1991 – Rogers, Vilonia, Eureka Springs
- 1990 – Rogers, Lake Hamilton, Eureka Springs
- 1989 – Rogers, Batesville, Eureka Springs
- 1988 – Fayetteville, Batesville, Caddo Hills
- 1987 – Rogers, Lake Hamilton, Altus-Denning
- 1986 – Conway, Lake Hamilton, Lamar
- 1985 – Rogers, Lake Hamilton, Lamar
- 1984 – Rogers, Vilonia, DeValls Bluff
- 1983 – Rogers, Batesville, Gentry
- 1982 – Rogers, Vilonia, Bradford
- 1981 – Rogers, Bradford
- 1980 – Rogers, Berryville

==== List of Arkansas state high school boys cross country champions ====
The following is a (fall sport) list of Arkansas state champions in boys cross country:

- 2026 – Bentonville, Russellville, Gravette, Harding Academy, St. Joseph, Rural Special
- 2025 – Bentonville, Mountain Home, Shiloh Christian, Providence Academy, Ozark Catholic, Rural Special
- 2024 – Bentonville, Mountain Home, Pottsville, Maumelle Charter, Ozark Catholic, Founders Classic
- 2023 – Bentonville, Mountain Home, Pea Ridge, West Fork, Haas Hall-Bentonville, Ozark Catholic
- 2022 – Bentonville, Mountain Home, Pea Ridge, Green Forest, Quitman, Ozark Catholic
- 2021 – Bentonville, Lake Hamilton, De Queen, Jessieville, Acorn, Ozark Catholic
- 2020 – Bentonville, Lake Hamilton, Pea Ridge, Episcopal Collegiate, Acorn, Northwest AR Classical
- 2019 – Bentonville, Mountain Home, Huntsville, West Fork, Ouachita
- 2018 – Bentonville, Lake Hamilton, Huntsville, Cave City, Ouachita
- 2017 – Bentonville, Lake Hamilton, Maumelle, Cave City, Genoa Central, Ouachita
- 2016 – Rogers, Lake Hamilton, Maumelle, Heber Springs, Green Forest, Acorn
- 2015 – Fayetteville, Lake Hamilton, Harrison, Heber Springs, Green Forest, West Side
- 2014 – Rogers, Lake Hamilton, Maumelle, Heber Springs, Green Forest, West Side
- 2013 – Rogers, Lake Hamilton, Harrison, Maumelle, Elkins, Eureka Springs
- 2012 – Bentonville, Mountain Home, LR Christian, Heber Springs, Elkins, Caddo Hills
- 2011 – Bentonville, Mountain Home, LR Christian, De Queen, Elkins, Caddo Hills
- 2010 – Bentonville, Russellville, LR Christian, Heber Springs, Elkins, Caddo Hills
- 2009 – Bentonville, Lake Hamilton, Siloam Springs, Shiloh Christian, Elkins, Crowley's Ridge
- 2008 – Rogers, Lake Hamilton, Siloam Springs, Heber Springs, Elkins, Trinity Christian
- 2007 – Rogers, Lake Hamilton, Harrison, De Queen, Shiloh Christian, Jasper
- 2006 – Rogers, Lake Hamilton, Siloam Springs, Heber Springs, Genoa Central, Jasper
- 2005 – Rogers, Beebe, Berryville, Jasper
- 2004 – Rogers, Greene County Tech, Heber Springs, Jasper
- 2003 – Rogers, Siloam Springs, De Queen, LR Lutheran
- 2002 – Rogers, Vilonia, De Queen, LR Lutheran
- 2001 – Russellville, LR Fair, Berryville, Acorn
- 2000 – Mountain Home, Siloam Springs, Berryville, Acorn
- 1999 – Rogers, Siloam Springs, Berryville, Eureka Springs
- 1998 – Rogers, Siloam Springs, Berryville, Acorn
- 1997 – Russellville, Siloam Springs, Berryville, Acorn
- 1996 – Rogers, Crossett, Berryville, Pottsville
- 1995 – Rogers, Sheridan, Eureka Springs
- 1994 – Rogers, Sheridan, Eureka Springs
- 1993 – Rogers, Sheridan, Eureka Springs
- 1992 – Bryant, Lake Hamilton, Eureka Springs
- 1991 – Bryant, Berryville, Eureka Springs
- 1990 – Rogers, Berryville, Eureka Springs
- 1989 – Rogers, Berryville, Eureka Springs
- 1988 – Rogers, Berryville, Eureka Springs
- 1987 – Conway, Crossett, Eureka Springs
- 1986 – Fayetteville, Crossett, Eureka Springs
- 1985 – Fayetteville, Harrison, Pea Ridge
- 1984 – Fayetteville, Crossett, Gentry
- 1983 – Fayetteville, Crossett, Central Arkansas Christian
- 1982 – LR Central, Bentonville, Gentry
- 1981 – LR Central, Berryville
- 1980 – LR Parkview, Ozark
- 1979 – LR Central, Ozark
- 1978 – Cabot, Ozark
- 1977 – LR Central, Berryville
- 1976 – LR Central, Berryville
- 1975 – LR Central, Fayetteville, Monticello, Berryville, Harding Academy
- 1974 – LR Hall, Fayetteville, Cabot, Berryville, Emerson
- 1973 – LR Hall, Fayetteville, Batesville, Berryville, Emerson
- 1972 – LR Central, Fayetteville, Searcy, Berryville, Emerson
- 1971 – LR Central, Fayetteville, Searcy, Berryville, Plainview
- 1970 – LR Central, Fayetteville, Searcy, Ozark, Kensett
- 1969 – LR Central, Fayetteville, Searcy, Beebe, Kensett
- 1968 – LR Central, Searcy, Charleston, Judsonia
- 1967 – LR Central, Searcy, Charleston, Prairie Grove
- 1966 – LR Central, Searcy, Beebe
- 1965 – Fayetteville, Conway, Charleston, Stamps
- 1964 – LR Central, Conway, Beebe, Stamps
- 1963 – LR Central
- 1962 – LR Central
- 1961 – LR Central
- 1960 – LR Central
- 1959 – LR Central
- 1958 – North Little Rock
- 1957 – LR Central
- 1956 – Little Rock
- 1955 – Little Rock

=== Winter sports ===
==== List of Arkansas state high school dance champions ====
The state competitive dance championships are held annually in November or December.

School year	7A state champion	6A state champion	5A state champion	4A state champion	3A-2A-1A state champion
2025	—N/a	Bentonville	Alma	Brookland	Episcopal Collegiate
2024	—N/a	Fayetteville	Little Rock Christian	Brookland	
2023	—N/a	Bentonville	Alma	Mountain View	
2022	—N/a	Bentonville	Alma	Brookland	
2021	—N/a	Bentonville	Little Rock Christian	Pulaski	
2020	—N/a	Bentonville	Little Rock Christian	Pulaski	Mountain View
2019	—N/a	Fayetteville	Little Rock Christian	Valley View	Mountain View
2018					
2017					
2016	Fayetteville	Jonesboro	Little Rock Christian	Bauxite	Mountain View
2015	Bentonville	Jonesboro	Little Rock Christian	Bauxite	Mountain View
2014	Bentonville	Alma	Nettleton	Bauxite	Glen Rose
2013	Bentonville	Benton	Alma	Bauxite	Glen Rose
2012	Bryant	Jonesboro	Alma	Westside Consolidated	Glen Rose
2011	Bentonville	Jonesboro	Nettleton	Westside Consolidated	Glen Rose

==== List of Arkansas state high school cheer champions ====
The state competitive cheer championships are held annually in November or December.

School year (Fall)	7A class	6A class	5A class	4A class	3A class	2A-1A class	5A-7A co-ed	1A-4A co-ed
2025	—N/a	Fayetteville	Sheridan	Brookland	Smackover	Buffalo Island Central	Bryant	Pea Ridge
2024	—N/a	North Little Rock	Greenwood	Brookland	Smackover	Junction City	Bentonville	Pea Ridge
2023	—N/a	Rogers	Greenwood	Brookland	Smackover	Junction City	Bentonville	Pea Ridge
2022	—N/a	North Little Rock	Benton	Brookland		East Poinsett County	Siloam Springs	Cedarville
2021	—N/a	North Little Rock	Benton	Valley View	Smackover		Bentonville	Pea Ridge
2020	—N/a	North Little Rock	HS Lakeside	Brookland	Booneville		Bentonville	Bauxite
2019	—N/a	Fayetteville	Lake Hamilton	Valley View	Junction City		Bentonville	Bauxite
2018	—N/a	Har-Ber	HS Lakeside	Valley View	Smackover		Van Buren	Lavaca
2017	Fayetteville; Har-Ber	Sheridan	HS Lakeside	Nashville	Lamar	Salem	Bentonville	Booneville
2016	Har-Ber	Sheridan	Valley View	Nashville	Smackover	East Poinsett County	Bentonville	West Fork
2015	Bryant	Sheridan	HS Lakeside	Pea Ridge	Booneville	Junction City	Bentonville	West Fork
2014	Har‐Ber	Benton	HS Lakeside	Shiloh Christian	Elkins	Bay	Bryant	Pea Ridge
2013	Fayetteville	Sheridan	HS Lakeside	Nashville	Elkins	Junction City	Bryant	Pea Ridge
2012	Fayetteville	Benton	HS Lakeside	Valley View	Elkins	Junction City	Bentonville	Heber Springs
2011	Fayetteville	Benton	HS Lakeside	Prairie Grove	Elkins	Junction City	Bentonville	Pea Ridge

==== List of Arkansas state high school basketball champions ====
The basketball season begins each November with the state basketball championship tournament held annually in late February and March.

==== List of Arkansas state high school boys bowling champions ====
The bowling season begins each November with the state bowling championship tournament held annually in late February.

According to the AAA Bowling Handbook, all Arkansas Activities Association rules will be followed. Rules for competition shall be those of the United States Bowling Congress (USBC) American Bowling Alliance. Arkansas Activities Association rules prevail in case of a conflict with standard USBC rules.

School year	7A-6A state champion	5A-4A state champion	3A-2A-1A state champion
2017–18	Southside	HS Lakeside	Mayflower
2016–17	Lake Hamilton	Westside	Mayflower
2015–16	Cabot	Nettleton	Norfork
2014–15	Cabot	Stuttgart	Norfork
2013–14	Cabot	Stuttgart	Elkins
2012–13	Cabot	Greenbrier	Conway St. Joseph
2011–12	Cabot	Siloam Springs	Elkins
2005–06	Vilonia		
2004–05		Vilonia	

==== List of Arkansas state high school girls bowling champions ====
According to the AAA Bowling Handbook, all Arkansas Activities Association rules will be followed. Rules for competition shall be those of the United States Bowling Congress (USBC) American Bowling Alliance. Arkansas Activities Association rules prevail in case of a conflict with standard USBC rules.

School year	7A-6A state champion	5A-4A state champion	3A-2A-1A state champion
2012–13	Bentonville	Greenbriar	Riverview
2012–13	Cabot	Jonesboro Westside	Norfolk
2011–12	Rogers	Valley View	Riverside
2010–11	Cabot	Vilonia	Riverside
2009–10	FS Southside	Vilonia	Brookland
2008–09	Cabot	Greenwood	Brookland
2007–08	FS Southside	Valley View	Brookland
2006–07	Lake Hamilton	Valley View	Mountain Pine
2005–06	Hot Springs Lakeside	Valley View	
2004–05	Fort Smith Southside		

==== List of Arkansas state high school wrestling champions ====
Arkansas became the 49th state to add high school wrestling when the Arkansas Activities Association approved wrestling as a sanctioned sport for the 2008–09 season. The wrestling season begins each November with the state wrestling championship tournament held annually in late February. The state tournament combines wrestlers from the 7A and 6A classifications and a separate competition for the 1A through 5A classifications.

Boys Wrestling

School year	7A state champion	6A state champion	5A state champion	4A-1A state champion
2025–26	—	Bentonville (8)	Van Buren (5)	Pottsville (2)
2024–25	—	Rogers Heritage (3)	Van Buren (4)	Gravette (2)
2023–24	—	Cabot (2)	Van Buren (3)	Gravette
2022–23	—	Cabot	Van Buren (2)	Pottsville
2021–22	—	Rogers Heritage (2)	Van Buren	Arkadelphia
2020–21	Bentonville (7)		Greenwood (2)	Shiloh Christian
2019–20	Bentonville (6)		Greenwood	Pulaski Academy (2)
2018–19	Bentonville (5)		Searcy	Pulaski Academy
2017–18	Bentonville (4)		Hot Springs Lakeside	
2016–17	Bentonville (3)		Greenbrier (2)	
2015–16	Har-Ber (2)		Greenbrier	
2014–15	Rogers		Central Arkansas Christian (3)	
2013–14	Little Rock Catholic		Maumelle (2)	
2012–13	Bentonville (2)		Maumelle	
2011–12	Har-Ber		Little Rock Christian	
2010–11	Conway		Beebe	
2009–10	Rogers Heritage		Gentry	
2008–09	Bentonville		Central Arkansas Christian (2)	
2007–08	Need Info.		Central Arkansas Christian	

Girls Wrestling

School year	6A state champion	5A-1A state champion
2025–26	Rogers (2)	Searcy (6)
2024–25	Little Rock Central	Searcy (5)
2023–24	Rogers	Searcy (4)
2022–23	Har-Ber	Searcy (3)
2021–22	Searcy (2)	
2020–21	Mountain Home	
2019–20	Searcy	

=== Spring sports ===
==== List of Arkansas state high school soccer champions ====
Boys Soccer:

- 2026 – Bentonville (5), Siloam Springs (5), De Queen (8), Decatur
- 2025 – Rogers Heritage, Russellville (9), Robinson, Episcopal Collegiate
- 2024 – Conway (5), Russellville (8), Clarksville (2), Green Forest (4)
- 2023 – Conway (4), Russellville (7), De Queen (7), Green Forest (3)
- 2022 – Conway (3), Russellville (6), Farmington, Harding Academy
- 2021 – Springdale (4), Van Buren (2), Valley View (3), Green Forest (2)
- 2020 – None due to COVID-19
- 2019 – Springdale (3), Russellville (5), Valley View (2), Central Arkansas Christian (3)
- 2018 – FS Northside (2), Russellville (4), Lakeside Hot Springs, Warren
- 2017 – Rogers, Siloam Springs (4), Hot Springs (2), Dardanelle (2)
- 2016 – Bentonville (4), Siloam Springs (3), Hot Springs, Dardanelle
- 2015 – Bentonville (3), Russellville (3), De Queen (6), Central Arkansas Christian (2)
- 2014 – Bentonville (2), Russellville (2), De Queen (5), Green Forest
- 2013 – FS Northside, Searcy (6), Little Rock Christian (3), Valley View
- 2012 – Springdale (2), Russellville, Siloam Springs (2), De Queen (4)
- 2011 – LR Catholic (5), Searcy (5), Siloam Springs, De Queen (3)
- 2010 – LR Catholic (4), Searcy (4), Little Rock Christian (2), De Queen (2)
- 2009 – LR Catholic (3), Searcy (3), Little Rock Christian, De Queen
- 2008 – Conway (2), Searcy (2), Harrison (6), Central Arkansas Christian
- 2007 – LR Catholic (2), Searcy, Pulaski Academy (3), Clarksville
- 2006 – Van Buren, Harrison (5)
- 2005 – Bentonville, Harrison (4)
- 2004 – Conway, Harrison (3)
- 2003 – Springdale, Harrison (2)
- 2002 – LR Catholic, Harrison
- 2001 – Pulaski Academy (2)
- 2000 – Pulaski Academy
- 1999 – Fayetteville
- 1998 – North Little Rock

Girls Soccer:

- 2026 – Mount St. Mary (2), Searcy (7), Robinson (2), Life Way Christian (2)
- 2025 – Bentonville (11), Little Rock Christian (6), Robinson, Life Way Christian
- 2024 – Bentonville (10), Pulaski Academy (9), Harding Academy (4), Episcopal Collegiate (2)
- 2023 – Bentonville (9), Harrison (8), Harding Academy (3), Episcopal Collegiate
- 2022 – Bentonville West, Searcy (6), Pulaski Academy (8), Harding Academy (2)
- 2021 – Fayetteville (5), Searcy (5), Pulaski Academy (7), Harding Academy
- 2020 – None due to COVID-19
- 2019 – Bryant (2), Little Rock Christian (5), Harrison (7), Central Arkansas Christian (9)
- 2018 – Rogers (4), Siloam Springs (5), Little Rock Christian (4), Central Arkansas Christian (8)
- 2017 – Bentonville (8), Siloam Springs (4), Harrison (6), Central Arkansas Christian (7)
- 2016 – Bentonville (7), Siloam Springs (3), Harrison (5), Central Arkansas Christian (6)
- 2015 – Bryant, Siloam Springs (2), Little Rock Christian (3), Gentry
- 2014 – Bentonville (6), Siloam Springs, Harrison (4), Valley View
- 2013 – Bentonville (5), Searcy (4), Shiloh Christian, Central Arkansas Christian (5)
- 2012 – Bentonville (4), Russellville, Central Arkansas Christian (4), Pulaski Academy (6)
- 2011 – Conway, Mountain Home (2), Harrison (3), Pulaski Academy (5)
- 2010 – Bentonville (3), Searcy (3), Little Rock Christian (2), Conway St. Joseph (2)
- 2009 – Bentonville (2), Mountain Home, Little Rock Christian, Conway St. Joseph
- 2008 – Mount St. Mary, Searcy (2), Pulaski Academy (4), Central Arkansas Christian (3)
- 2007 – Bentonville, Searcy, Pulaski Academy (3), Central Arkansas Christian (2)
- 2006 – Rogers (3), Central Arkansas Christian
- 2005 – Rogers (2), Pulaski Academy (2)
- 2004 – Rogers, Harrison (2)
- 2003 – LR Central (2), Pulaski Academy
- 2002 – LR Central, Harrison
- 2001 - Fayetteville (4)
- 2000 – Fayetteville (3)
- 1999 – Fayetteville (2)
- 1998 – Fayetteville

==== List of Arkansas state high school softball champions ====
Fast Pitch

- 2026 – Bentonville (8), Farmington (5), Monticello, Harding, Tuckerman (3), Taylor (12)
- 2025 – Bentonville (7), Benton (7), Pea Ridge, Mayflower, Riverside (2), Taylor (11)
- 2024 – Bentonville (6), Sheridan (6), Farmington (4), Hackett, Mansfield (2), Taylor (10)
- 2023 – Bryant (7), Benton (6), Gravette, Booneville (2), Riverside, Taylor (9)
- 2022 – Bentonville (5), Benton (5), Valley View, Ashdown (2), Tuckerman (2), Taylor (8)
- 2021 – Bentonville (4), Benton (4), Morrilton, Baptist Prep (3), Tuckerman, Taylor (7)
- 2020 – No Games Due to Covid-19 Pandemic
- 2019 – Cabot, Sheridan (5), Pottsville, Rose Bud (2), Quitman (2), Taylor (6)
- 2018 – Bentonville (3), Sheridan (4), Greenbrier (2), Bauxite, Haskell -Harmony Grove (5), Quitman, Taylor (5)
- 2017 – Bentonville (2), Sheridan (3), De Queen, Pottsville, Rose Bud, Rison, Taylor (4)
- 2016 – Bentonville, Sheridan (2), Vilonia (3), Mena (2), Bald Knob (3), Spring Hill (2), Nemo Vista (3)
- 2015 – North Little Rock (7), Greenwood, Vilonia (2), Mena, Bald Knob (2), Spring Hill, Scranton (2)
- 2014 – North Little Rock (6), Benton (3), White Hall (3), Brookland, Bald Knob, Foreman (7), Midland
- 2013 – North Little Rock (5), Russellville, White Hall (2), Nashville (3), Benton Harmony Grove (4), Magnet Cove, Taylor (3)
- 2012 – Bryant (6), Lake Hamilton (4), White Hall, Nashville (2), Mansfield, Junction City, Taylor (2)
- 2011 – Bryant (5), Searcy, Wynne, Farmington (3), Atkins, Foreman (6), Nemo Vista (2)
- 2010 – Bryant (4), Mountain Home (2), Greenbrier, Nashville, Arkansas Baptist (4), Foreman (5), Armorel
- 2009 – North Little Rock (4), Lake Hamilton (3), Wynne, Dardanelle (2), Perryville, Foreman (4), Scranton
- 2008 – North Little Rock (3), Mountain Home, Nettleton (2), Ashdown, Elkins (2), Foreman (3), Nemo Vista
- 2007 – Fayetteville (2), Lake Hamilton (2), Vilonia, Dardanelle, Elkins, Foreman (2), West Side GF
- 2006 – Fayetteville, Marion, Central Arkansas Christian, Foreman, Lockesburg (2)
- 2005 – Benton (2), Batesville (2), Farmington (2), Arkansas Baptist (3), Taylor
- 2004 – Benton, Hope (2), Booneville, Benton Harmony Grove (3), Lockesburg
- 2003 – Texarkana, Hope, Prairie Grove (3), Benton Harmony Grove (2), Ouachita
- 2002 – North Little Rock (2), Nettleton, Prairie Grove (2), Benton Harmony Grove
- 2001 – North Little Rock, Batesville, Prairie Grove, Newark
- 2000 – Rogers, Lake Hamilton, Farmington
- 1999 – Sheridan

Slow Pitch

- 2003 – McCrory
- 2002 – Hoxie
- 2001 – Parkers Chapel, Ouachita
- 2000 – Sylvan Hills, Murfreesboro, Lockesburg (2)
- 1999 – Bryant (3), Nashville, Cedarville, Lockesburg
- 1998 – Benton, Greenwood, Southside Batesville, Arkansas Baptist (2), Guy-Perkins
- 1997 – Bryant (2), Batesville, Nettleton, Arkansas Baptist
- 1996 – Bryant, Vilonia, Barton, St. Joseph

== See also ==
- List of high schools in Arkansas
- List of school districts in Arkansas
- Mississippi Association of Independent Schools
- NFHS
