= Holly Grove School District =

Defunct school district in Arkansas, United States

Holly Grove School District No. 7 was a school district headquartered in Holly Grove, Arkansas.

By 2004 new laws were passed requiring school districts with enrollments below 350 to consolidate with other school districts. Holly Grove was one of several districts that were unable to find another district willing to consolidate with it, so the Arkansas Board of Education was to forcibly consolidate it. On July 1, 2004, the Holly Grove School District was merged into the Clarendon School District.
