= Bald Knob School District =

School district in Arkansas, United States

Bald Knob Public Schools

Location
- 103 W Park Ave; Bald Knob, Arkansas 72010 White County United States

District information
- Motto: Pride Achievement integrity
- Grades: H.L. Lubker Elementary-K-5 Bald Knob Middle School-6th-8th Bald Knob High School-9th-12th
- Established: 1897
- Superintendent: Formerly Mr.Brad Roberts but now the Bald Knob School Board.
- Accreditation: Arkansas Department of Education
- Schools: 3
- Budget: $1,000,000
- NCES District ID: 0502700

Students and staff
- Students: 1,578+
- Teachers: 109.49 (on FTE basis)
- Staff: 230.49 (on FTE basis)
- Student–teacher ratio: 11.90
- Athletic conference: 3A Region 2 (football); 3A Region 5 (basketball) Team Name-Bald Knob Bulldogs
- District mascot: Bulldog
- Colors: Blue; White

Other information
- Website: www.baldknobschools.org

Bald Knob School District (BKS) is a public school district based in Bald Knob, Arkansas, United States. Bald Knob Schools Has 3 Schools H.L. Lubker Elementary Bald Knob Middle School and Bald Knob High School.

The school district encompasses 183.97 square miles (476.5 km^{2}) of land in White County and Jackson County and serves all of Bald Knob and portions of Bradford, Russell, and Judsonia.

== Schools ==
- H. L. Lubker Elementary,
- Bald Knob Middle School,
- Bald Knob High School,

== Extra Classes ==
Cheer, Band, E.a.s.t, Dance, Football and Basketball
