= Parkers Chapel School District =

School district in Arkansas, United States

Address
- 401 Parkers Chapel Road El Dorado, Arkansas, 71730; United States

District information
- Type: Public
- Grades: PreK–12
- NCES District ID: 0511220

Students and staff
- Students: 837
- Teachers: 93.31
- Staff: 61.25
- Student–teacher ratio: 8.97

Other information
- Website: www.parkerschapelschool.com

Parkers Chapel School District is a public school district based in El Dorado, Arkansas, United States. The school district encompasses 45.31 square miles (117.4 km^{2}) of land in Union County serving El Dorado and Junction City.

== Schools ==
- Parkers Chapel High School, serving more than 300 students in grades 7 through 12.
- Parkers Chapel Elementary School, serving more than 350 students in prekindergarten through grade 6.

== See also ==
- El Dorado School District
