= Crowley's Ridge College =

Private Christian junior college in Arkansas

Coordinates: 36.06608°N 90.58459°W

- Type: Private college
- Established: 1964
- Religious affiliation: Church of Christ
- President: Richard Johnson
- Students: 225 (Fall 2023)
- Location: Paragould, Arkansas, U.S.
- Campus: Rural, 150 acres (61 ha)
- Colors: Green & White
- Nickname: Pioneers
- Sporting affiliations: NAIA – American Midwest
- Website: www.crc.edu

Crowley's Ridge College is a private Christian college in Paragould, Arkansas, United States. While the college is affiliated with the Churches of Christ, students of all religious backgrounds are welcome. The fall 2024 student population of 299 comprises both non-traditional and traditional residential and commuter students.

== History ==
Crowley's Ridge College began in 1964. Its spiritual origins go back to two earlier institutions in the area: MONEA Christian College, in Rector, and Croft College, which was located in rural Greene County, both of which were defunct by the end of the 1930s. The school achieved a major milestone in 2000 when it was formally accredited by the Higher Learning Commission and was included in membership in the North Central Association. After many years as the only two-year college in the United States affiliated with the Churches of Christ, Crowley's Ridge College began transiting to become a four-year institution in 2007, when it received approval from the Arkansas Department of Higher Education to offer degrees at the baccalaureate level. In September 2008, the transition was completed when the Higher Learning Commission extended the college's accreditation to include the new degrees of Bachelor of Science in Business Administration and Bachelor of Arts in Biblical Studies.

In addition to three associate degree programs, the college offers eleven degree programs at the baccalaureate level.

== Location ==
The more than 166-acre (0.67 km^{2}) campus is located atop the namesake geographic feature, Crowley's Ridge, in eastern Arkansas. The pine tree-covered campus has a lake at the center of campus. There are eight buildings, containing 85,000 square feet (7,900 m^{2}), located on the college campus that is located on Highway 412 at the western city limits of Paragould, Arkansas.

== Athletics ==
The Crowley's Ridge athletic teams are called the Pioneers. The college is a member of the National Association of Intercollegiate Athletics (NAIA), primarily competing in the American Midwest Conference since the 2024–25 academic year. The Pioneers previously competed as an NAIA Independent within the Continental Athletic Conference from 2016–17 to 2023–24; as well as being members of the National Christian College Athletic Association (NCCAA), primarily competing as an independent in the Central Region of the Division I level through the 2015–16 school year.

Crowley's Ridge competes in eight intercollegiate varsity sports: Men's sports include baseball, basketball, golf, and cross country; while women's sports include basketball, softball, volleyball and cross country; and CRC also has an 18 hole disc golf course on its campus.

== See also ==
- Crowley's Ridge Academy
