= Jackson Woodard =

American football player (born 2002)

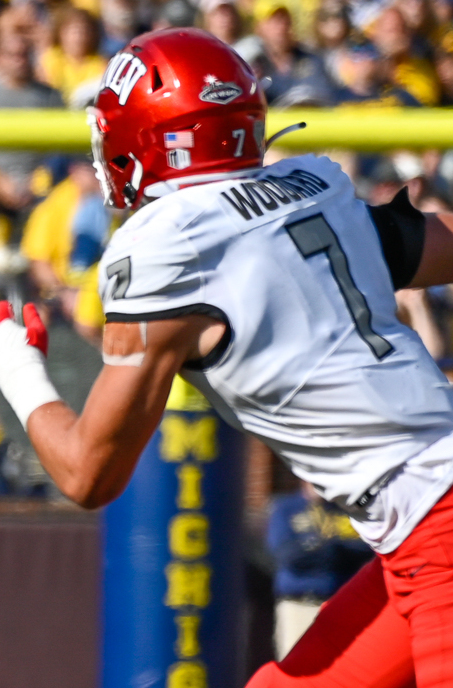
- Woodard with UNLV in 2023

No. 42 – Miami Dolphins
- Position: Linebacker
- Roster status: Active

Personal information
- Born: July 2, 2002 (age 24); Memphis, Tennessee, U.S.
- Listed height: 6 ft 2 in (1.88 m)
- Listed weight: 229 lb (104 kg)

Career information
- High school: Little Rock Christian (Little Rock, Arkansas)
- College: Arkansas (2020–2022); UNLV (2023–2024)
- NFL draft: 2025: undrafted

Career history
- Seattle Seahawks (2025)*; Houston Texans (2025); Miami Dolphins (2025–present)
- * Offseason or practice squad member only

Awards and highlights
- MW Defensive Player of the Year (2024); 2× First-team All-MW (2023, 2024)

Career NFL statistics as of 2025
- Total tackles: 2
- Stats at Pro Football Reference

Ernest Jackson Woodard (born July 2, 2002) is an American professional football linebacker for the Miami Dolphins of the National Football League (NFL). He played college football for the Arkansas Razorbacks and UNLV Rebels.

== Early life ==
Woodard attended Little Rock Christian Academy in Little Rock, Arkansas. He was an unranked recruit and received offers from schools such as Southern Nazarene and VMI. However, Woodard decided to commit to play college football for the Arkansas Razorbacks as a preferred walk-on.

== College career ==
=== Arkansas ===
In three seasons at Arkansas from 2020 to 2022, Woodard played in 28 games where he totaled 16 tackles, and a pass deflection. After the 2022 season, he entered his name into the NCAA transfer portal.

=== UNLV ===
Woodard transferred to play for the UNLV Rebels. In his first season with UNLV in 2023, he had a breakout season notching 116 tackles with nine being for a loss, two and a half sacks, four pass deflections, and an interception. In the 2024 season opener, Woodard was named the Mountain West Conference defensive player of the week after posting 11 tackles with four being for a loss, three sacks, and a pass deflection in a win over Houston.

== Professional career ==
Pre-draft measurables
Height	Weight	Arm length	Hand span	Wingspan	40-yard dash	10-yard split	20-yard split	20-yard shuttle	Three-cone drill	Vertical jump	Broad jump	Bench press
6 ft 2 in (1.88 m)	234 lb (106 kg)	31 in (0.79 m)	9 in (0.23 m)	6 ft 5 5/8 in (1.97 m)	4.87 s	1.71 s	2.77 s	4.50 s	7.44 s	36.0 in (0.91 m)	9 ft 9 in (2.97 m)	21 reps
All values from NFL Combine/Pro Day

=== Seattle Seahawks ===
Woodard signed with the Seattle Seahawks as an undrafted free agent on May 2, 2025. He was waived four days later.

=== Houston Texans ===
On May 7, 2025, Woodard was claimed off waivers by the Houston Texans. He was waived on August 26 as part of final roster cuts, and re-signed to the practice squad. On November 20, the Texans added Woodard to their roster as a standard gameday practice squad elevation.

=== Miami Dolphins ===
On December 17, 2025, Woodard was signed by the Miami Dolphins off the Texans practice squad.
