= KIPP SoCal Public Schools =

Charter school operator in Southern California

KIPP SoCal ("SoCal" means Southern California) is a charter school operator associated with KIPP (Knowledge Is Power Program). KIPP LA, serving the Los Angeles metropolitan area, was founded in 2003 with two middle schools and now consists of 15 schools.

According to an article in LA School Report, the district "serves 5,750 students, 90 percent of them low income, 74 percent are Latinos, 24 percent are English learners, and 11 percent receive special education services."

KIPP LA united with KIPP San Diego in July 2019 to form KIPP SoCal. Marcia Aaron is KIPP SoCal's CEO and founder.

== Awards and recognition ==
In 2015, KIPP Raíces Academy School was named a National Blue Ribbon School by the US Department of Education. The same award was given in 2016 to KIPP Los Angeles College Prep.

A 2016 Education Equality Index from Education Cities recognized the work done by three KIPP LA schools to close the achievement gap.

A 2017 Stanford University study said that KIPP LA gained 90 days of learning in reading compared with students at LA district schools.

== Conflicts with District ==
In 2017, KIPP LA was involved with a conflict with the Los Angeles School District over what KIPP considered to be overly aggressive oversight, including by the district's inspector general.

== See also ==
- KIPP: Delta Public Schools
- KIPP San Antonio Public Schools
