= Clarendon School District =

School district in Arkansas, United States

Address
- 316 North Sixth Street Clarendon, Arkansas, 72029; United States

District information
- Type: Public
- Grades: PreK–12
- NCES District ID: 0504350

Students and staff
- Students: 471
- Teachers: 47.33
- Staff: 60.5
- Student–teacher ratio: 9.95

Other information
- Website: www.clarendonlions.org

Clarendon School District 6 is a school district based in Clarendon, Arkansas, United States. The school district supports more than 550 students and employs more than 110 educators and staff for its two schools and district offices.

CSD encompasses 392.52 square miles (1,016.6 km^{2}) of land in Monroe County and Prairie County.

== History ==
In 1966 the Arkansas County School District dissolved, with portions going to the Clarendon school district.

On July 1, 2004, the Holly Grove School District was merged into the Clarendon School District.

== Schools ==
- Clarendon Elementary School, serving prekindergarten through grade 6.
- Clarendon High School, serving grades 7 through 12.
