= D. J. Williams (tight end) =

American football player (born 1988)

D.J. Williams
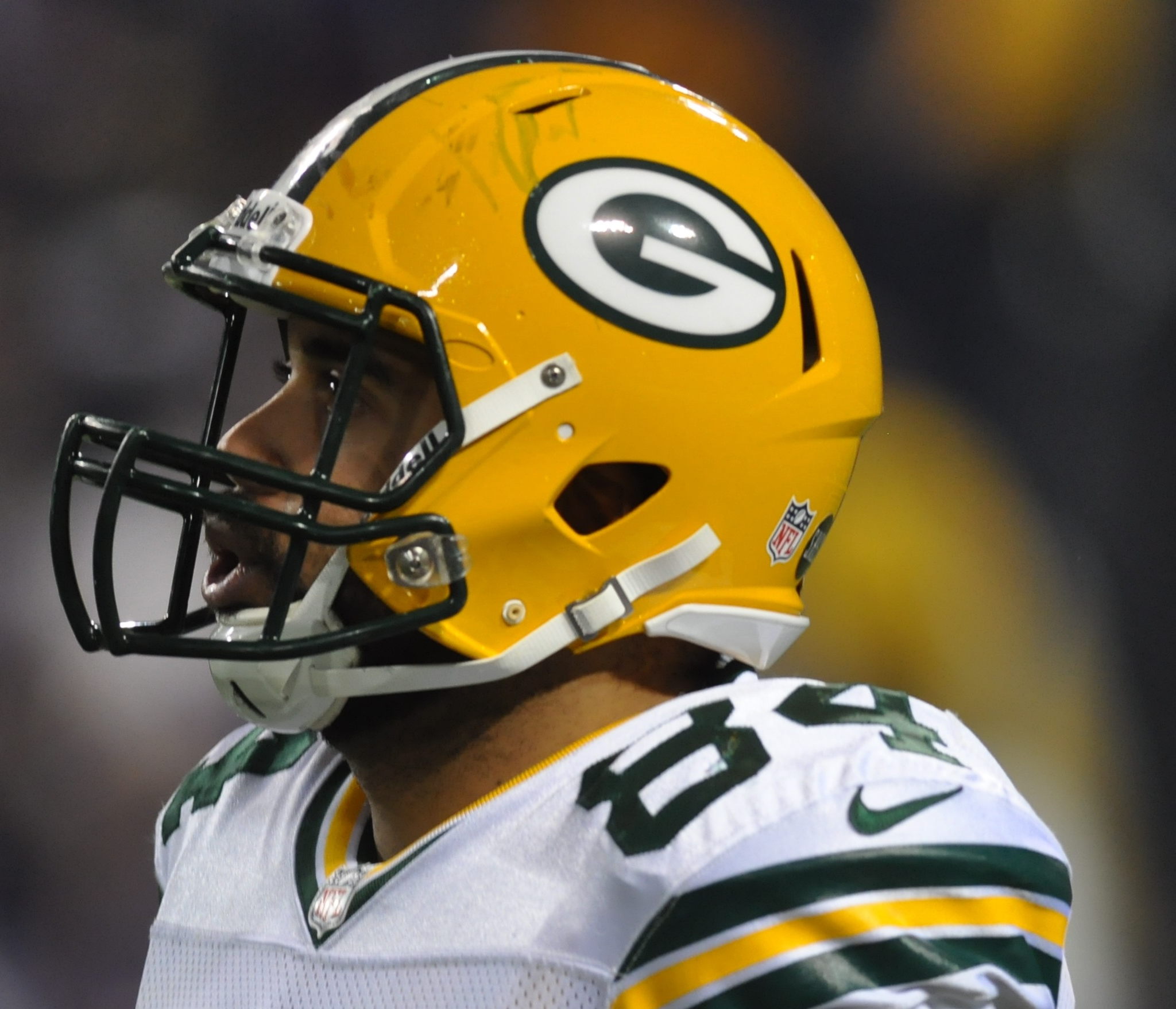
- Williams with the Green Bay Packers in 2012

No. 84, 85, 86
- Position: Tight end

Personal information
- Born: September 10, 1988 (age 38); Fort Worth, Texas, U.S.
- Listed height: 6 ft 2 in (1.88 m)
- Listed weight: 245 lb (111 kg)

Career information
- High school: Central Arkansas Christian (North Little Rock, Arkansas)
- College: Arkansas
- NFL draft: 2011: 5th round, 141st overall pick

Career history
- Green Bay Packers (2011–2012); Jacksonville Jaguars (2013); New England Patriots (2013); Tampa Bay Buccaneers (2014); Washington Redskins (2015)*
- * Offseason or practice squad member only

Awards and highlights
- John Mackey Award (2010); Third-team All-American (2010); 2× First-team All-SEC (2008, 2010); Second-team All-SEC (2009)

Career NFL statistics
- Receptions: 9
- Receiving yards: 70
- Receiving average: 7.8
- Stats at Pro Football Reference

David Edward "D. J." Williams Jr. (born September 10, 1988) is an American former professional football player who was a tight end in the National Football League (NFL). He played college football for the Arkansas Razorbacks before being selected by the Green Bay Packers in the fifth round of the 2011 NFL draft.

== Early life ==
Williams attended Central Arkansas Christian High School, where his initial athletic interest was basketball. He was encouraged to try football by high school coach Tim Perry. DJ was named all-state after his senior season, and was considered a four star recruit by most recruiting services.

== College career ==
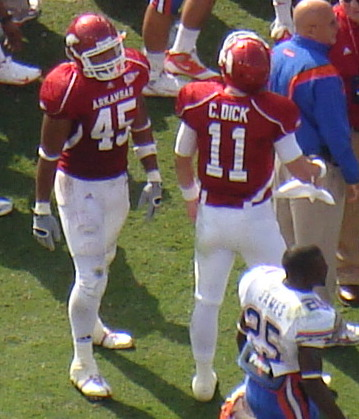
Williams (45) with the Arkansas Razorbacks in 2008

Williams played college football for the Arkansas Razorbacks. He was long considered a competitor for the 2010 John Mackey Award which is awarded to the nation's most outstanding tight end, along with Lance Kendricks and Michael Egnew. On December 9, 2010 it was announced that DJ was the 2010 John Mackey Award recipient at the 2010 Home Depot College Football Awards Red Carpet show on ESPNU. He also won the 2010 Disney Spirit Award as college football's most inspirational player. DJ was named to the 2010 1st Team All-SEC squad by the coaches and the AP, after amassing 54 receptions for 627 yards and 4 TD for a Razorbacks team that finished 10-3 after a loss to Ohio St in the Sugar Bowl. Arkansas won the Liberty Bowl over East Carolina in his junior year of 2009, finishing with a record of 8-5.

== Professional career ==
Pre-draft measurables
Height	Weight	Arm length	Hand span	Wingspan	40-yard dash	10-yard split	20-yard split	20-yard shuttle	Three-cone drill	Vertical jump	Broad jump	Bench press
6 ft 2 1/8 in (1.88 m)	245 lb (111 kg)	31 1/2 in (0.80 m)	10 3/8 in (0.26 m)	6 ft 3 1/4 in (1.91 m)	4.67 s	1.62 s	2.72 s	4.51 s	7.29 s	33.5 in (0.85 m)	9 ft 3 in (2.82 m)	20 reps
All values from NFL Combine

=== Green Bay Packers ===
Williams was considered one of the best tight end prospects for the 2011 NFL draft. Williams was selected in the fifth round, with the 141st overall pick, by the Green Bay Packers.

Williams was released by the Packers on August 31, 2013.

=== Jacksonville Jaguars ===
Williams was claimed off waivers by the Jacksonville Jaguars on September 1, 2013.

He was released by the Jaguars on November 4, 2013.

=== New England Patriots ===
On November 26, 2013, he was signed by the New England Patriots.

On December 4, 2013, he was waived by the New England Patriots.

Williams re-signed with the Patriots on December 9, 2013, after a season-ending injury to starting tight end Rob Gronkowski.

On August 21, 2014, Williams was released by the Patriots.

=== Tampa Bay Buccaneers ===
Williams signed with the Tampa Bay Buccaneers on November 25, 2014. He was waived on December 2.

=== Washington Redskins ===
On August 16, 2015, the Washington Redskins signed Williams. On September 4, he was waived with an injury settlement for final roster cuts before the start of the regular season.

=== NFL statistics ===
Year	Team	Games	Receptions	Targets	Yards	Average Receiving Yards	Longest Reception	Receiving Touchdowns	First Downs	Fumbles	Fumbles Lost
2011	GB	13	2	4	13	6.5	7	0	0	0	0
2012	GB	13	7	15	57	8.1	12	0	3	0	0
Total	Total	35	9	21	70	7.8	12	0	3	0	0

== Personal life ==
Williams is a member of Pleasant Valley Church of Christ in Little Rock, Arkansas. Although like other students Williams could have cited many accolades, he chose this statement alone to appear with his picture in the yearbook: "Baptized into Christ." Williams has cited The Passion of the Christ as exemplifying the way he and his mother, Vicky Williams, and his two sisters overcame his abusive father and other challenges, including on the football field. DJ was working as a co-host on the morning show at Little Rock NBC affiliate television station KARK channel 4, when he was called by the Washington Redskins to join the team during their 2015 pre-season camp. Since he was cut before the regular season began, Williams returned to KARK. Williams has spearheaded "D.J.'s Day of Action" to build awareness and raise funds for Women & Children First, a Little Rock charity that helped Williams' family break the cycle of domestic violence when he was a child.
