= Clarendon High School (Arkansas) =

Public school in Arkansas, United States

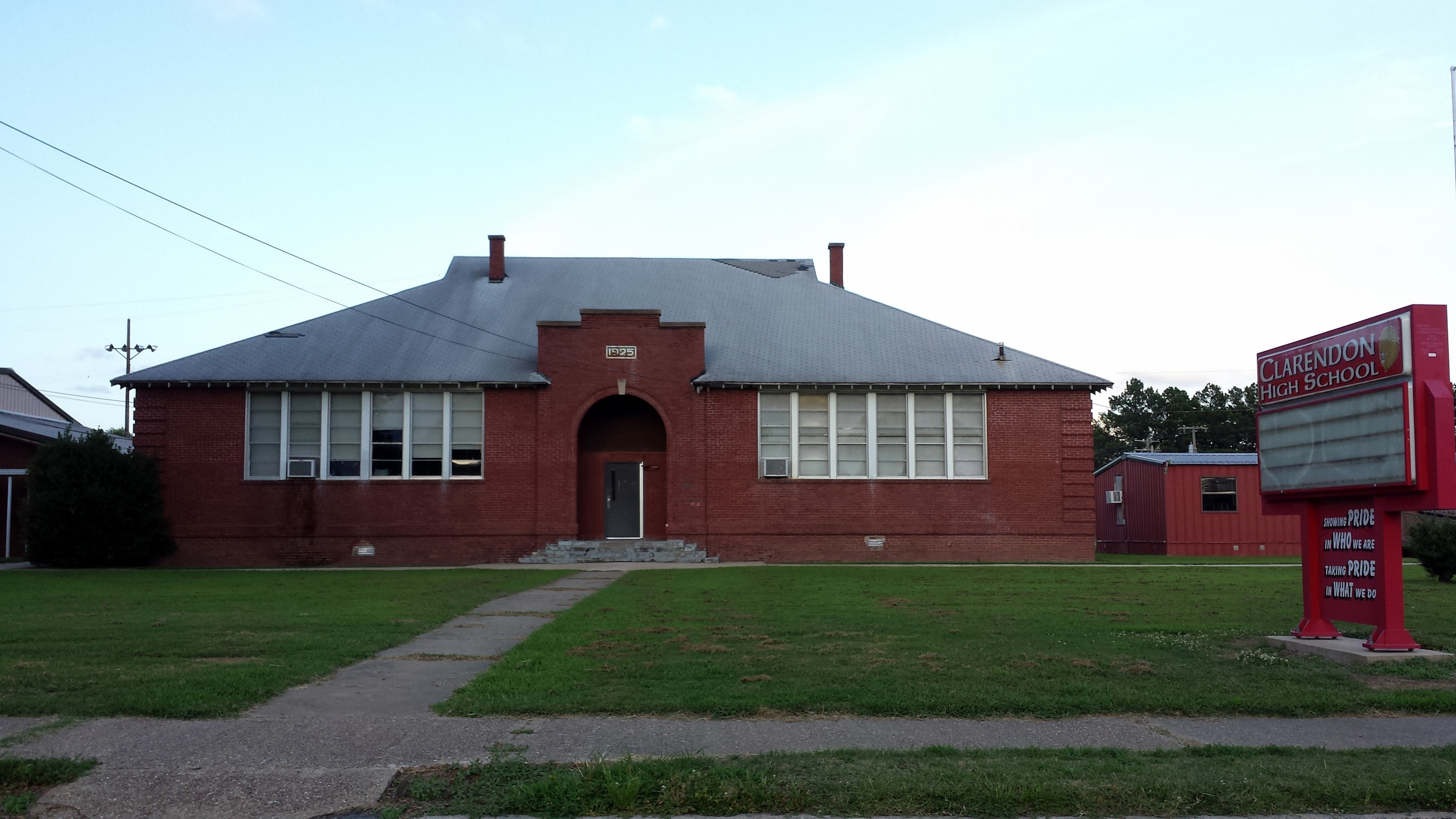

Location
- 320 North Seventh Street; Clarendon, Arkansas 72029; United States; 35°55′17″N 93°3′33″W

Information
- School type: Public comprehensive
- Status: Open
- School district: Clarendon School District
- CEEB code: 040455
- NCES School ID: 050435000164
- Teaching staff: 22.71 (on FTE basis)
- Grades: 7–12
- Enrollment: 194 (2023–2024)
- Student to teacher ratio: 8.54
- Education system: ADE Smart Core
- Classes offered: Regular, Advanced Placement (AP)
- Campus type: Rural
- Colors: Red and white
- Athletics conference: 2A Region 6 (2012–14)
- Sports: Basketball, baseball, softball, track
- Mascot: Lion
- Team name: Clarendon Lions
- Accreditation: ADE
- Affiliation: Arkansas Activities Association
- Website: www.clarendonlions.org

Clarendon High School (CHS) is an accredited comprehensive public high school located in Clarendon, Arkansas, United States. CHS provides secondary education for more than 250 students in grades 7 through 12. It is one of two public high schools in Monroe County and the sole high school administered by the Clarendon School District.

== Academics ==
Clarendon High School is a Title I school that is accredited by the Arkansas Department of Education (ADE). The assumed course of study follows the ADE Smart Core curriculum, which requires students complete at least 22 units prior to graduation. Students complete regular coursework and exams and may take Advanced Placement (AP) courses and exam with the opportunity to receive college credit.

== Athletics ==
The Clarendon High School mascot for academic and athletic teams is the Lion with red and white serving as the school colors.

The Clarendon Lions compete in interscholastic activities within the 2A Classification, the state's second smallest classification administered by the Arkansas Activities Association. For 2012–14, the Lions play within the 2A 6 Conference. Clarendon fields junior varsity and varsity teams in football, bowling (boys/girls), cheer, basketball (boys/girls), baseball, softball, and track and field (boys/girls).
