= KIPP: Delta Collegiate High School =

Location
- 514 Missouri Street; Helena-West Helena, Arkansas 72342; United States; 34°31′21″N 90°35′23″W

Information
- School type: Public (government funded)
- Status: Open
- School district: KIPP Delta Public Schools
- NCES District ID: 0500062
- Authority: Arkansas Department of Education (ADE)
- Superintendent: Scott Spainhour
- CEEB code: 041089
- NCES School ID: 050006201451
- Principal: Susan Jackson
- Grades: 9–12
- Enrollment: 206 (2011–12)
  - Grade 9: 66
  - Grade 10: 70
  - Grade 11: 45
  - Grade 12: 25
- Student to teacher ratio: 9.50
- Education system: Charter; Knowledge Is Power Program; ADE Smart Core curriculum
- Colors: Blue and white
- Athletics conference: 1A 5 North (2012–14)
- Sports: Basketball (boys/girls), cross country (boys/girls), soccer (boys), track (boys/girls), volleyball (girls)
- Feeder schools: KIPP:Delta College Prep School (5–8)
- Affiliation: Arkansas Activities Association
- Website: www.deltaprepschools.org/o/dphs

KIPP: Delta Collegiate High School is a comprehensive public charter high school serving students in grades nine through twelve in Helena-West Helena, Arkansas, United States.

== Curriculum ==
Based on the KIPP network of free, open-enrollment, college-preparatory schools, the KIPP curriculum meets or exceeds the Smart Core curriculum developed the Arkansas Department of Education (ADE), which requires students to complete 22 credit units before graduation. Students engage in regular and Advanced Placement (AP) coursework and exams, preparatory courses in ACT/SAT testing, leadership workshops, and partnerships with local colleges and universities.

== Extracurricular activities ==
The KIPP: Delta Collegiate High School school colors are blue and white. The KIPP Delta Collegiate participate in various interscholastic activities in the 1A 5 North Conference administered by the Arkansas Activities Association. The school athletic activities include basketball (boys/girls), cross country (boys/girls), soccer (boys only), track (boys/girls), and volleyball.
