= Humphrey High School (Humphrey, Arkansas) =

Location
- Humphrey, Arkansas; United States
- Coordinates: 34°25′4″N 91°42′26″W

Information
- Status: Closed

Humphrey High School was a public secondary school in Humphrey, Arkansas, located in Arkansas County. The Humphrey School District merged with DeWitt School District and now students attend DeWitt High School.
