= Little Rock Christian Academy =

Location
- 19010 Cantrell Road; Little Rock, Arkansas 72223; United States; 34°48′45″N 92°28′50″W

Information
- School type: Private
- Motto: Excellence in the Pursuit of Truth from a Christ-Centered Worldview
- Religious affiliation: Christian
- Denomination: Non-denominational
- Established: 1977 (49 years ago)
- CEEB code: 041489
- NCES School ID: 01610343
- Head of school: Justin Smith
- Teaching staff: 142
- Employees: 250
- Grades: PK3–12th
- Enrollment: 1708 (2025–2026)
  - Kindergarten: 72
  - Grade 1: 71
  - Grade 2: 54
  - Grade 3: 83
  - Grade 4: 76
  - Grade 5: 70
  - Grade 6: 99
  - Grade 7: 136
  - Grade 8: 554
  - Grade 9: 130
  - Grade 10: 435
  - Grade 11: 400
  - Grade 12: 400
- Hours in school day: 7.2
- Colors: Navy blue, forest green, white
- Fight song: Notre Dame Victory March
- Athletics conference: 7A Central
- Sports: Baseball, basketball, bowling, spirit teams, cross country, football, golf, soccer, softball, tennis, track and field, swimming, volleyball, wrestling
- Mascot: Warriors
- Nickname: LRCA
- Team name: Little Rock Christian Academy Warriors
- Accreditation: Southern Association of Independent Schools, Arkansas Non-Public Schools Accrediting Association, and Council of Educational Standards and Accountability
- Affiliations: Association of Christian Schools International (ACSI)
- National Blue Ribbon School: 2012

Little Rock Christian Academy is a private, college-preparatory Christian school catering to students from PK3 through 12th grade. Established in 1977 under the name Walnut Valley Christian Academy, it holds accreditation from the Southern Association of Independent Schools (SAIS) and the Arkansas Non-Public Schools Accrediting Association (ANSAA. Additionally, it is affiliated with The College Board, National Honor Society, National Beta Club, and the Council of Educational Standards and Accountability (CESA).

== Academics ==
Little Rock Christian Academy has received the ACT College Readiness award for two consecutive years. The school has an average ACT score of 26 and has produced 61 National Merit finalists and three National Achievement award recipients since 1998, underscoring its reputation for rigorous academics. In its middle school, LRCA's DUKE Tip program has achieved record numbers for the past two years. At the high school level, LRCA offers AP and Honors classes, and the class of 2020 received over $18.1 million in scholarship offers. LRCA was honored as a National Blue Ribbon School in 2012. While the school maintains a spirited rivalry with Pulaski Academy, it has not secured a state championship in the past four years

== Athletics ==
LRCA is affiliated with the Arkansas Activities Association. The Warriors athletic program encompasses a variety of sports including baseball, basketball, spirit teams, cross country, football, golf, soccer, softball, tennis, track and field, swimming, volleyball, and wrestling.

The Warrior Pom squad has achieved notable success, securing five state championships in the years 2015, 2016, 2018, 2019, and 2020. Additionally, they attained a runner-up position in 2017.

In the 2012–13 school year, both the boys' and girls' cross country teams claimed victory in the 5A state championship.

In the 2017–2018 school year, the Lady Warrior soccer team secured its second 5A state championship.

On December 2, 2018, LRCA achieved its inaugural state football championship victory, triumphing over the four-time defending Class 5A state champion, Pulaski Academy.

== School Principals ==
- Ann Chami – Elementary School
- LeAnn Murray – Middle School
- Tyler Eatherton – Junior High
- Adam Funmaker – High School

== Notable alumni ==
- Damarea Crockett - NFL football running back with the Denver Broncos
- Michael Dyer – former Auburn National Championship MVP running back
- Walker White - college football quarterback
- Jackson Woodard – NFL football linebacker with the Houston Texans
