= Sacred Heart Catholic School (Morrilton, Arkansas) =

Location
- 106 North St. Joseph Street; Morrilton, Conway County, Arkansas 72110; United States; 35°9′9″N 92°44′28.56″W

Information
- School type: Private, Secondary
- Motto: Enlightening Minds, Enriching Souls, and Inspiring Hearts Since 1879
- Religious affiliation: Roman Catholic
- Established: 1879 (147 years ago)
- School district: Roman Catholic Diocese of Little Rock
- CEEB code: 041720
- Principal: Buddy Greeson
- Grades: K–12
- Colors: Red and white
- Mascot: Knight
- Website: www.sacredheartmorrilton.org

Sacred Heart High School is a private, K-12 Roman Catholic school in Morrilton, Arkansas established in 1879.

== Description ==
Sacred Heart School is located in the Roman Catholic Diocese of Little Rock was founded in 1879, serving grades 1 through 8. The high school was opened in 1923.

== Sports ==
Sacred Heart School is a member of the Arkansas Activities Association. The school fields teams in boys' and girls' basketball, softball, baseball, golf, cross country, and cheerleading. The girls' basketball team won the Class A State Championship in 2006 and 2007.

== Mascot ==
Sacred Heart School was known as the Rebels beginning in 1962. Prior to that they had been known as the Gridders and Panthers. The school began feeling pressure to change the mascot as early as 1991. Beginning in 2005 the school began removing iconography that included images of the Johnny Reb mascot and the Confederate Battle Flag. In December 2020 leadership in the school took nominations for a new mascot. Three potential mascots were introduced to be voted on by the school's patrons, Knights, Express, and Cardinals. On February 26, 2021, the school announced it had chosen Knights to be the school's new mascot beginning in the 2021–2022 school year.
