= Bald Knob High School =

Location
- 901 North Hickory Street; Bald Knob, Arkansas 72010; United States
- Coordinates: 35°18′49″N 91°34′20″W

Information
- School type: Public comprehensive
- Status: Open
- School district: Bald Knob School District
- Superintendent: Malissa Gipson
- CEEB code: 040095
- NCES School ID: 050270000038
- Principal: Wesley Roberts
- Teaching staff: 50.06 (on FTE basis)
- Grades: 9–12
- Enrollment: 336 (2023-2024)
- Student to teacher ratio: 6.71
- Education system: ADE Smart Core curriculum
- Classes offered: Regular, Advanced Placement (AP)
- Colors: Blue and white
- Athletics conference: 3A Region 2
- Mascot: Bulldog
- Team name: Bald Knob Bulldogs
- Accreditation: ADE
- USNWR ranking: No. 16 (AR); No. 1,800 (USA)
- Yearbook: BKS
- Feeder to: Bald Knob Middle School
- Affiliation: Arkansas Activities Association
- Website: baldknobschools.org

Bald Knob High School is a comprehensive public high school for students in grades 9 through 12 located in Bald Knob, Arkansas, United States. The school serves more than 412 students in White County.

== Academics ==
The assumed course of study follows the Smart Core curriculum developed by the Arkansas Department of Education (ADE), which requires students complete at least 22 units prior to graduation. Students complete regular coursework and exams and may take Advanced Placement (AP) courses and exam with the opportunity to receive college credit.

In 2012, Bald Knob High School had rankings of No. 1,800 (national rank) and No. 16 (state rank) in the Best High Schools Report developed by U.S. News & World Report.

== Athletics ==
The Bald Knob High School athletic emblem (mascot) is the Bulldog with blue and white serving as the school colors.

The Bald Knob Bulldogs compete in interscholastic activities within the 3A Classification administered by the Arkansas Activities Association. The Bulldogs play within the 3A Region 2 Conference and field varsity teams in football, golf (boys/girls), basketball (boys/girls), cross country (boys/girls), cheer, bowling (boys/girls), baseball, fastpitch softball, and track and field (boys/girls).

== Notable alumni ==
- Jason Jennings (1997)—Professional basketball player.
