= Mammoth Spring High School =

Location
- 410 Goldsmith Avenue; Mammoth Spring, Arkansas 72554; United States
- Coordinates: 36°29′26″N 91°32′27″W

Information
- School type: Public comprehensive
- Status: Open
- CEEB code: 041530
- NCES School ID: 050927000666
- Teaching staff: 60.84
- Grades: 7–12
- Enrollment: 220 (2023–2024)
- Student to teacher ratio: 3.62
- Education system: ADE Smart Core
- Classes offered: Regular, Advanced Placement (AP)
- Colors: Blue and white
- Athletics conference: 1A 2 (2012–14)
- Sports: Golf, Cross Country, Basketball, Baseball, Softball, Track, Cheer
- Mascot: Bear
- Team name: Mammoth Spring Bears
- Accreditation: ADE; AdvancED (1997-)
- Website: www.mammothspringschools.com

Mammoth Spring High School is a comprehensive public high school located in Mammoth Spring, Arkansas, United States. It is one of three public high schools in Fulton County and the sole high school administered by Mammoth Spring School District. For the 2010–11 school year, this Title I school provides secondary education for more than 220 students in grades 7 through 12 and employs more than 20 educators.

== Academics ==
The assumed course of study for Mammoth Spring students follows the Smart Core curriculum developed by the Arkansas Department of Education (ADE), which requires students complete 22 units prior to graduation. Students complete regular coursework and exams and may elect to take Advanced Placement (AP) courses and exams with the opportunity for college credit. The school is accredited by the ADE and has been accredited by AdvancED since 1996.

== Athletics ==
The Mammoth Spring High School athletic emblem and mascot is the Bear with blue and white serving as the school colors.

The Mammoth Spring Bears compete in interscholastic activities within the 1A Classification—the state's smallest classification—via the 1A Region 2 Conference administered by the Arkansas Activities Association. The Bears field teams in golf (boys/girls), cross country (boys/girls), basketball (boys/girls), cheer, baseball, softball, and track and field (boys/girls). The 2011 - 2012 Mammoth Spring Boys Basketball team won the Arkansas State 1A Championship.

== Notable alumna ==
- Tess Harper
