= Academics Plus Charter Schools =

School district in Arkansas

Maumelle Charter High School

Location
- 900 Edgewood Drive; Maumelle, Arkansas 72113; United States
- Coordinates: 34°51′55″N 92°24′18″W

Information
- School type: Public charter
- Status: Open
- NCES District ID: 0500059
- Authority: Arkansas Department of Education (ADE)
- CEEB code: 041528
- NCES School ID: 050005900741
- Director: Robert McGill
- Principal: Kim Willis
- Grades: 7–12
- Enrollment: 454 (2022–2023)
- Student to teacher ratio: 17.20
- Education system: Charter
- Colors: Navy blue and white
- Athletics conference: 1A 5 North (2012–14)
- Sports: Golf, bowling, cross country, cheer, basketball, soccer, baseball, softball, tennis, track
- Accreditation: ADE
- Affiliation: Arkansas Activities Association
- Website: www.academicsplus.org

Academics Plus Charter Schools ('APCS) is an open-enrollment public charter school system in the Little Rock metropolitan area, United States; the Academics Plus Charter School District maintains its headquarters in Maumelle. It consists of four schools: Scott Charter School in Scott and Maumelle Charter Elementary School, Maumelle Charter High School, and "Maumelle Charter Middle School" all in Maumelle.

Academics Plus was chartered in 2001 as the first charter school in Arkansas. The charter was renewed in 2003 and 2007.

The Arkansas Department of Education classifies the school system as a school district.

== Academics ==
Based on the KIPP network of free, open-enrollment, college-preparatory schools, the KIPP curriculum meets or exceeds the Smart Core curriculum developed the Arkansas Department of Education (ADE), which requires students to complete 22 credit units before graduation. Students engage in regular and Advanced Placement (AP) coursework and exams, preparatory courses in ACT/SAT testing, leadership workshops, and partnerships with local colleges and universities.

Academics Plus has partnered with the University of Central Arkansas, the University of Arkansas at Little Rock and the University of Arkansas at Monticello to offer twelve concurrent credit courses in math, English, history and music. In 2011, a total of 210 concurrent credit hours were earned by the 23 graduating seniors.

== Extracurricular activities ==
The Academics Plus Charter School mascot and athletic emblem is the Falcon with school colors of navy and white.

=== Athletics ===
The Academics Plus Falcons participate in various interscholastic activities in the 1A 5 North Conference administered by the Arkansas Activities Association. The school athletic activities include golf (boys/girls), cross country (boys/girls), bowling (boys/girls), cheer, basketball (boys/girls), soccer (boys/girls), tennis (boys/girls), and track (boys/girls).
