= Parkers Chapel High School =

Location
- 401 Parkers Chapel Road; El Dorado, Arkansas 71730; United States
- Coordinates: 33°10′2″N 92°43′18″W

Information
- Status: Open
- School district: Parkers Chapel School District
- NCES District ID: 0511220
- Authority: Arkansas Department of Education (ADE)
- Superintendent: Jana Young
- CEEB code: 040695
- Teaching staff: 59.83 (on an FTE basis)
- Grades: 7–12
- Enrollment: 359 (2023–2024)
- Student to teacher ratio: 6.00
- Education system: ADE Smart Core curriculum
- Classes offered: Regular, Advanced Placement (AP)
- Colors: Royal blue and white
- Athletics conference: 2A
- Sports: Football, golf, cross country, basketball, cheer, baseball, softball, tennis, track
- Mascot: Trojan
- Team name: Parkers Chapel Trojans
- Accreditation: ADE
- Feeder schools: Parkers Chapel Elementary School (PK–6)
- Affiliation: Arkansas Activities Association
- Website: www.parkerschapelschool.com/o/pc-high

Parkers Chapel High School is an accredited comprehensive public high school serving more than 300 students in grades 7 through 12 in the community of Parkers Chapel, Arkansas, United States. It is one of five public high schools in Union County, Arkansas, and the sole high school administered by the Parkers Chapel School District.

== Academics ==
Parkers Chapel High School has been accredited by the Arkansas Department of Education (ADE) and has been accredited by AdvancED (formerly North Central Association) since 1992. The assumed course of study follows the Smart Core curriculum developed the ADE, which requires students to complete 22 credit units before graduation. Students engage in regular (core and career focus) courses and exams and may select Advanced Placement (AP) coursework and exams that provide an opportunity for college credit. Parkers Chapel is a member of the South Central Service Cooperative that provides career and technical education programs to area students in multiple school districts.

== Athletics ==
For 2012–14, the Parkers Chapel Trojans participate in various interscholastic activities in the 2A Classification from the 2A Region 7 Conference as administered by the Arkansas Activities Association. The school athletic activities include football, golf (boys/girls), cross country (boys/girls), basketball (boys/girls), competitive cheer, baseball, softball, tennis (boys/girls) and track and field (boys/girls).

- Golf: The boys golf team won three state golf championships in the fall 1999, 2006, and 2007.
- Tennis: The girls tennis teams won consecutive state tennis championships in spring 2006 and 2007.
- Baseball: The baseball team has won three state baseball championships in the spring 2002, 2007 and 2011.
- Softball: The softball team won its first state (slowpitch) softball championship in spring 2001.
