= De Queen High School =

Location
- 1803 W Coulter Dr; De Queen, Arkansas 71832; United States
- Coordinates: 34°1′47″N 94°21′20″W

Information
- School type: Public
- School board: De Queen School District
- NCES District ID: 0500049
- CEEB code: 040605
- NCES School ID: 050004900235
- Grades: 10–12
- Enrollment: 522 (2023-2024)
- Colors: Black and gold
- Mascot: Leopard
- Team name: De Queen Leopards
- Affiliation: Arkansas Activities Association
- Website: dequeen5.gabbartllc.com

De Queen High School (or DeQueen High School) is a comprehensive public high school in De Queen, Arkansas, United States that serves grades 10 through 12. It is one of two public high schools (the other at Horatio, AR) in Sevier County and is managed by the De Queen School District.

== Academics ==
The assumed course of study is the Smart Core curriculum developed by the Arkansas Department of Education. Students may engage in regular and Advanced Placement (AP) coursework and exams prior to graduation. De Queen has been accredited by AdvancED (formerly North Central Association) since 1933.

== Extracurricular activities ==
The De Queen High School mascot is the leopard with school colors of black and gold. For 2012-14, the De Queen Leopards participate in the 5A South Conference for interscholastic activities administered by the Arkansas Activities Association (AAA) including baseball, basketball (boys/girls), cheer, cross country, SOCCER (boys/girls), football, archery, golf (boys/girls), softball, tennis (boys/girls) and track and field (boys/girls).

The Leopards boys track and field teams have won 13 state championships between 1958 and 2009 with the boys cross country team taking home four state titles between 2002 and 2011. The boys soccer team has won 6 state championships and consecutive state championships between 2009 and 2012.
