= Decatur High School (Arkansas) =

Location
- 1498 Stadium Drive; Decatur, Arkansas 72722; United States; 36°19′55″N 94°26′41″W

Information
- School type: Public comprehensive
- Motto: Learning for all!
- Status: Open
- School district: Decatur School District
- Superintendent: Steven Watkins
- CEEB code: 040580
- NCES School ID: 050498000221
- Principal: Matt Boeving
- Teaching staff: 25 (on FTE basis)
- Grades: 7–12
- Enrollment: 171 (2022–2023)
- Student to teacher ratio: 3.62
- Education system: ADE Smart Core
- Classes offered: Regular, Advanced Placement (AP)
- Colors: Blue and gold
- Athletics conference: 2A–4 (Football); 2A–4 West (Basketball)
- Mascot: Bulldog
- Team name: Decatur Bulldog
- Accreditation: ADE
- Website: www.decatursd.com/highschoolhome

Decatur High School is a comprehensive public high school located in the rural community of Decatur, Arkansas, United States. The school provides secondary education for students in grades 7 through 12. It is one of nine public high schools in Benton County, Arkansas, and the sole high school administered by the Decatur School District.

In addition to Decatur, the district includes small sections of Centerton and Highfill.

== Academics ==
Decatur High School is accredited by the Arkansas Department of Education (ADE) and the assumed course of study follows the Smart Core curriculum developed by the ADE, which requires students complete at least 22 units prior to graduation. Students complete regular coursework and exams and may take Advanced Placement (AP) courses and exam with the opportunity to receive college credit.

== Athletics ==
The Decatur High School mascot and athletic emblem is the bulldog with blue and gold serving as the school colors.

The Decatur Bulldogs compete in interscholastic activities within the 2A Classification—the state's second smallest classification—via the 2A Region 4 Conference (football), and 2A Region 4 West Conference (basketball), as administered by the Arkansas Activities Association. The Bulldogs field teams in football, cross country (boys/girls), tennis (boys/girls), basketball (boys/girls), soccer (boys/girls), track and field (boys/girls), baseball, softball, and cheer.
