= Conway Christian School =

Location
- 500 East German Lane; Conway, Arkansas 72032; United States; 35°04′13″N 92°24′01″W

Information
- Religious affiliation: Christian
- Opened: 1992 (34 years ago)
- Status: Open
- CEEB code: 040491
- NCES School ID: A9900164
- President: Jason Carson
- Head of school: Damitra Crow
- Teaching staff: 120
- Grades: PreK - 12th
- Enrollment: 880 (PK–12) (2026)
- Average class size: 18
- Colors: Navy blue, red and white
- Athletics conference: 3A classification (football); 4-2A East (basketball); 5-2A North (Baseball)
- Mascot: Eagle
- Team name: Conway Christian Eagles
- Website: www.conwaychristianschool.org

Conway Christian School (CCS) is a private, college preparatory Christian school serving students in grades PK3 through 12th grade located in Conway, Arkansas, United States. The school has a curriculum leading to several concurrent credit hours through local colleges. Conway Christian is accredited by the Arkansas Nonpublic School Accrediting Association (ANSAA).

== Athletics ==
The Conway Christian Eagles compete in the 2A Classification administered by the Arkansas Activities Association. Conway Christian offers the opportunity to participate in football, baseball, softball, volleyball, bowling (boys/girls), cross country (boys/girls), golf (boys/girls), basketball (boys/girls), cheer, tennis (boys/girls), and track and field (boys/girls). Conway Christian athletes have been successful at both the regional and state levels, and several athletes have accepted college athletic scholarships. The CCS men's golf and American football teams both won 2A state championships in 2024.

== Clubs ==
CCS offers a wide variety of clubs for its students to participate in. These clubs include: arts, drama, quiz bowl, marching band, choir, and color guard. The high school quiz bowl team has been dominant since its formation in 2008, winning a total of 6 state championships.
