= Huntsville High School (Arkansas) =

Location
- 594 South Harris Street; Huntsville, Arkansas 72740; United States; 36°4′56″N 93°44′3″W

Information
- Status: Open
- School district: Huntsville School District
- NCES District ID: 0508130
- Authority: Arkansas Department of Education (ADE)
- CEEB code: 041210
- NCES School ID: 050813000538
- Principal: Roxanne Enix
- Grades: 9-12
- Enrollment: 604 (2023-2024)
- Student to teacher ratio: 9.66
- Education system: ADE Smart Core curriculum
- Colors: Maroon and white
- Athletics conference: 5A West (2012-14)
- Mascot: Eagle
- Team name: Huntsville Eagles
- Accreditation: AdvancED (1992-)
- Yearbook: The Eagle
- Feeder schools: Huntsville Middle School
- Affiliation: Arkansas Activities Association
- Website: www.huntsvilleschooldistrict.org/o/hhs

Huntsville High School is a comprehensive public high school serving students in grades nine through twelve in Huntsville, Arkansas, United States. It is one of three public high schools in Madison County and is the one of two high schools administered by the Huntsville School District. In 2012, Huntsville High School was nationally recognized with the Bronze Award by the U.S. News & World Report in its ranking of Best High Schools.

== Curriculum ==
The student body makeup is 49 percent male and 51 percent female, and the total minority enrollment is 27 percent. The assumed course of study follows the smart core curriculum developed the Arkansas Department of Education, which requires students to complete 22 credit units before graduation. Students engage in regular and Advanced Placement coursework and exams. Huntsville High School has been accredited by AdvancED (formerly North Central Association) since 1992.

In 2010, student Aidan M. Baker was honored as a scholar of the Presidential Scholars Program.

== Athletics ==
The Huntsville High School mascot is the eagle with school colors of maroon and white.

The Huntsville Eagles participate in various interscholastic activities in the Class 4A-1 Conference administered by the Arkansas Activities Association. From the fall 2014 through spring 2017 school years, they will compete in the 4A-1 Conference. The school athletic activities include baseball, basketball (boys/girls), competitive cheer, cross country (boys/girls), football head coach Matt Williams, golf (boys/girls), soccer (boys/girls) head coach Kevin Shinn, softball, and volleyball. .

State Championships: Baseball (1995, 1997) Girls Basketball (1996). Girls Golf (1997)
