= Central Arkansas Christian Schools =

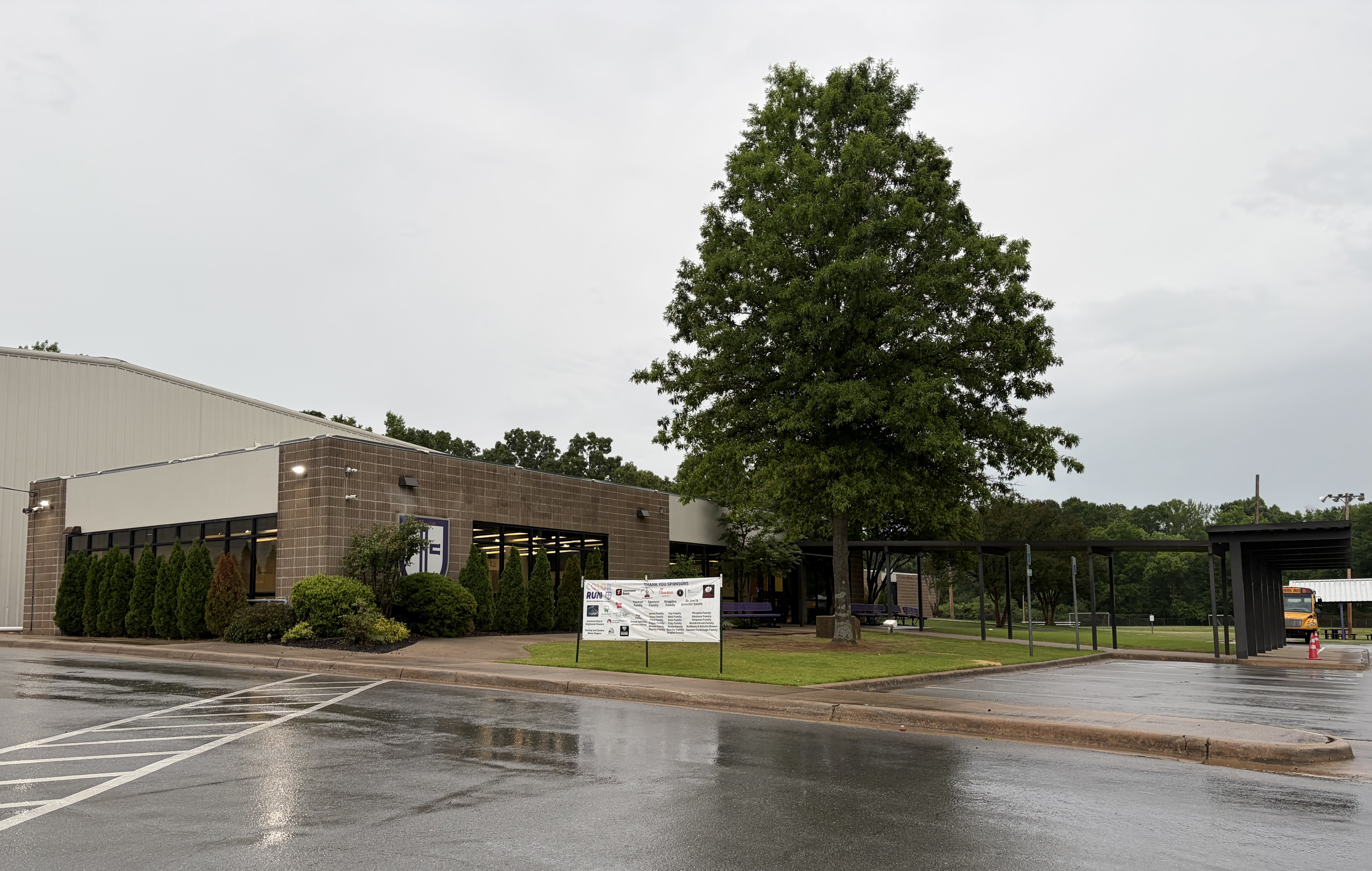
- CACS's elementary campus in North Little Rock

Location
- 1 Windsong Drive; North Little Rock, Pulaski County, Arkansas 72113; United States; 34°48′55″N 92°21′18″W

Information
- Religious affiliation: Christianity
- Denomination: Churches of Christ
- Opened: 1971 (55 years ago)
- Founder: Doug Freeman
- Status: Open
- CEEB code: 041223
- President: Andy Stewart
- Principal: Julie Parker
- Grades: PK3-12
- Enrollment: 980
- Student to teacher ratio: 13.1
- Classes offered: Regular, Advanced Placement
- Hours in school day: 8:00 am – 3:30 pm
- Campus: "Mustang Mountain" (6th-12th), Pleasant Valley (PreK3-5th), "Mustang Mountain" Elementary (PreK3-5th), and North Little Rock (PreK3-5th)
- Campus size: 40 acres (16 ha)
- Campus type: Suburban
- Colors: Purple and Vegas gold
- Athletics conference: 4A 2
- Sports: Football, basketball, soccer, baseball, wrestling, tennis, bowling, cross country, golf, volleyball, track and field, swimming
- Mascot: Mustang horse
- Nickname: CAC
- Team name: CAC Mustangs
- Rival: Harding Academy
- Accreditation: AdvancED; Arkansas Non-public Schools Accrediting Association
- Affiliation: National Christian School Association, The College Board
- Website: www.cacmustangs.org

Central Arkansas Christian Schools (CAC) is a group of four private schools based in North Little Rock, Arkansas, United States. CAC was established in 1971 at Sylvan Hills Church of Christ in Sherwood, Arkansas. Because of its foundation date, the school has been categorized as a segregation academy although enrollment records indicate black students were enrolled in the school as early as 1974. The Central Arkansas Christian School system includes a combination middle and high school campus in North Little Rock and three elementary schools: a campus in Pleasant Valley/Little Rock, a campus in North Little Rock, and another directly connected to the high school. Together, they composed the state's fourth-largest combined private school for the 2018-19 school year. The schools are "affiliated" with (but not operated or owned by) the Churches of Christ and are members of the Council for Advancement and Support of Education.

== History ==
Central Arkansas Christian School opened in 1971. Because of the timing of the school's establishment, it has been categorized as a segregation academy, a term associated with private schools established in response to the court ordered racial integration of public schools. The founders of the school repeatedly stated that admission was open to all regardless of race. Black students were enrolled in the school as early as 1974.

The organization bought 40 acres (16 ha) of adjacent land, for $500,000 in August 2003, to allow further expansion. Notable visitors to the school include Pat Buchanan, who spoke to the high school students in 1999.

== Academics ==
Central Arkansas Christian School is fully accredited by AdvancED and the Arkansas Non-public Schools Accrediting Association. CAC is also a member of the National Christian School Association and The College Board.

== Extracurricular activities ==
The Central Arkansas Christian High School mascot and athletic emblem is the Mustang, who was named Maverick in 2023, with purple and gold serving as the school colors.

=== Athletics ===
The CAC Mustangs participate in the 4A Classification within the 4A 2 Conference as administered by the Arkansas Activities Association. The Mustangs compete in football, volleyball, golf (boys/girls), cross country (boys/girls), basketball (boys/girls), soccer (boys/girls), cheer, swimming and driving (boys/girls), tennis (boys/girls), baseball, fastpitch softball, wrestling, track and field (boys/girls), and bowling (boys/girls).

Central Arkansas Christian High School has won many state championships including:

- Football: 2004.
- Golf: 1994, 1997, 2005, 2012 (boys); 2015 (girls)
- Basketball: 2005, 2006, 2007, 2018 (girls) 2024 (boys)
- Baseball: 1990, 1994, 1995, 2000, 2004, 2009
- Tennis: 1982, 1998, 2005, 2010 (boys)
- Soccer: 2006–08, 2012–13, 2016–19 (girls); 2008, 2015, 2019 (boys)
- Softball: 2006 (AAA)
- Wrestling: 2008, 2009, 2015
- Bowling: 2021 (girls)

CAC became the first private school in Arkansas to add wrestling to their program. The wrestling team won the 2008 Arkansas Wrestling Association championship, in the 1A-4A classification.

=== Fine Arts ===
CAC offers many other, non-athletic, extracurricular classes such as marching band, quiz bowl, and drama productions.

== Notable Alumni ==
- A. J. Burnett (1995)—Athlete; Major League Baseball (MLB) professional pitcher.
- Jennifer Sherrill (2002)—Miss Arkansas USA 2004.
- D. J. Williams (2007)—Athlete; NFL professional football player.
- Joe Adams (2008)—Athlete; NFL professional football player.
- Christyn Williams (2018)—Athlete; 2018 Gatorade National Player of the Year, University of Connecticut women's basketball player
