= Prescott High School (Arkansas) =

Location
- 736 Martin Street; Prescott, Arkansas; United States
- Coordinates: 33°47′28″N 93°22′39″W

Information
- Motto: Impact the Pack
- School district: Prescott School District
- NCES District ID: 051182000899
- CEEB code: 041140
- NCES School ID: 0511820
- Faculty: 24.41 (on FTE basis)
- Grades: 7–12
- Enrollment: 327 (2010–11)
- Student to teacher ratio: 13.40
- Colors: Maroon and white
- Fight song: Washington and Lee Swing
- Athletics conference: 3A Region 5 (2014–15)
- Mascot: Curley Wolves
- Affiliations: Arkansas Activities Association
- Website: www.curleywolves.org

Prescott High School is comprehensive public junior/senior high school located in Prescott, Arkansas, United States. The southwest Arkansas school serves students in grades 7 through 12 and is administered by the Prescott School District.

== Academics ==
The assumed course of study for students follows the Smart Core curriculum developed by the Arkansas Department of Education (ADE), which requires students complete at least 22 units to graduate. Students engage in regular courses and exams and may take Advanced Placement (AP) coursework and exams with the opportunity for college credit.

== Extracurricular activities ==
The Prescott High School mascot and athletic emblem is uniquely known as the Curley Wolves with maroon and white serving as the school colors.

For 2020–2021, the Prescott Curley Wolves compete in interscholastic competition in the 3A Region 5 Conference administered by the Arkansas Activities Association including football, golf (boys/girls), cross country (boys/girls), basketball (boys/girls), competitive cheer, baseball, softball, tennis (boys/girls), and track and field (boys/girls).

- Football: The Curley Wolves football team has won state football championships in 1972, 1973, 1975, 1995, and 2016.
- Track and field: The boys track and field team are 15-time state champions including championships in 1986, 1989, 1992, 2007–2009, 2012, 2015, 2017-2024(no meet in 2020 due to COVID-19)Runners up in 2010,2011,2014,2016,2025. Boys have also won the indoor track state championship in 2023–2024.
- The Girls track team won a state championship in 1985 & 2024. The girls have also won indoor state championships in 2023 & 2024
- Basketball: The girls basketball team won a state championship in 1971.
- Band: The Prescott High School Marching Band won the 1st Arkansas 3A State Marching Championship in 2016.
