= Crowley's Ridge Academy =

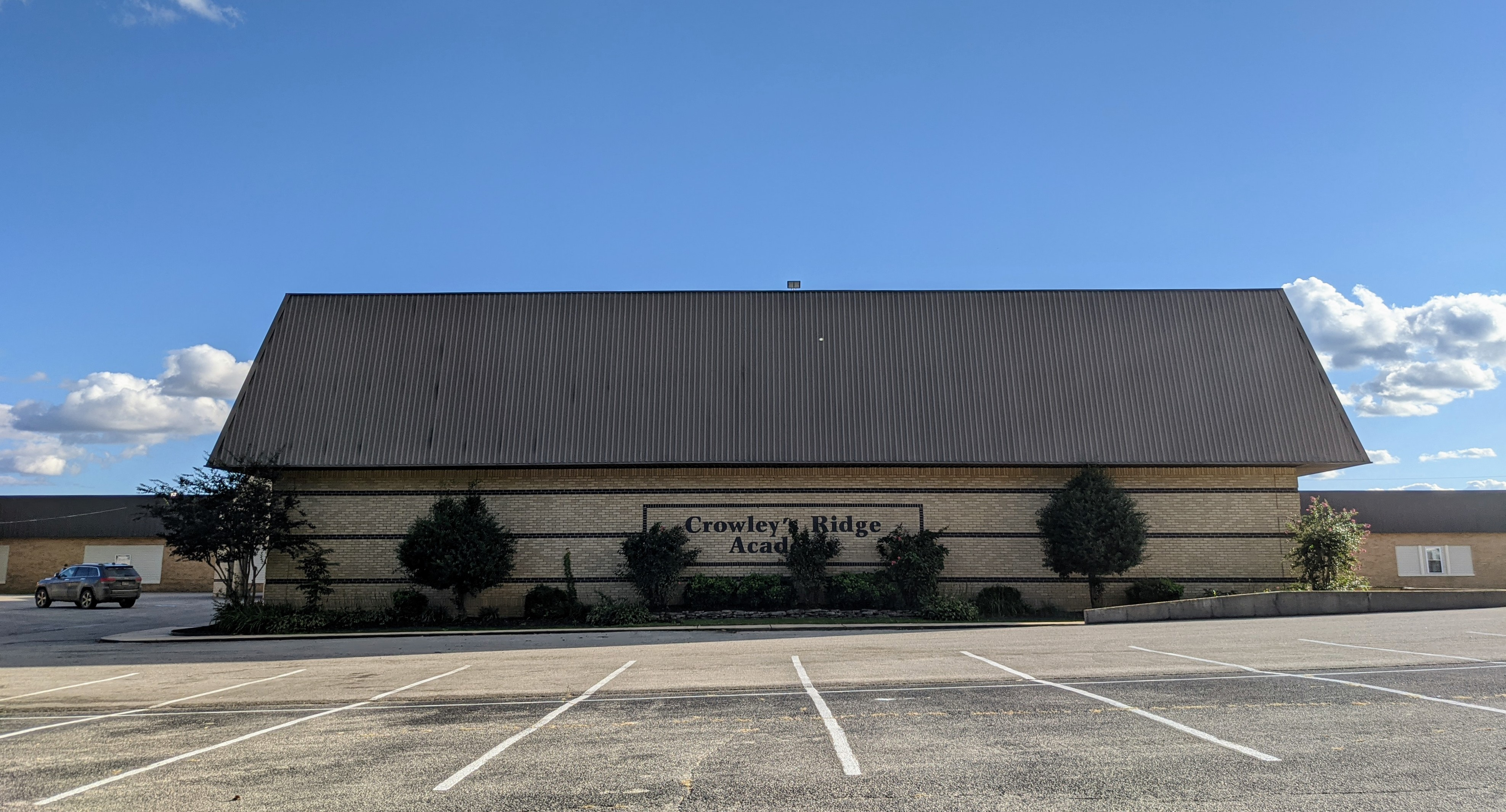

Location
- 606 Academy Drive; Crowley's Ridge; Paragould, Arkansas 72450; United States
- Coordinates: 36°3′28″N 90°33′30″W

Information
- School type: Private Public (government funded)
- Established: 1953 (73 years ago)
- Status: Open
- CEEB code: 041945
- NCES School ID: 00048337
- Teaching staff: 20.5 (on FTE basis)
- Grades: PK-6 & 7–12
- Enrollment: 360 (2025–26)
- Student to teacher ratio: 12.3
- Education system: ADE Smart Core curriculum
- Classes offered: Regular, Dual Enrollment
- Campus type: Rural
- Colors: Maroon and white
- Athletics: Volleyball, Golf, Cross Country, Basketball, Tennis, Baseball, Softball, Track & Field
- Athletics conference: 1A 3 East (2024-26)
- Mascot: Falcon
- Team name: CRA Falcons
- Accreditation: NCSA, ANSAA, AdvancED (1982–)
- Affiliation: Churches of Christ, Crowley's Ridge College, Arkansas Activities Association
- Website: www.crafalcons.org

Crowley's Ridge Academy (CRA) is a private Christian school serving students in prekindergarten through grade 12 in the rural community of Paragould, Arkansas, United States. Founded in 1953, the 22 acres (8.9 ha) campus located in the region known as Crowley's Ridge, serves more than 429 students and the school is affiliated with the Churches of Christ, with students accepted and welcomed from all denominations and religious affiliations.

== Academics ==
CRA is accredited by AdvancED since 1982 and is accredited by the Arkansas Nonpublic School Accrediting Association (ANSAA) and the National Christian School Association (NCSA).

The assumed course of study follows the Smart Core curriculum developed by the Arkansas Department of Education (ADE), which requires students to complete at least 24 credit units before graduation. Students engage in regular (core) and career focus courses and exams and may select Advanced Placement (AP) coursework and exams that may lead to college credit.

== Athletics ==
The Crowley's Ridge Academy High School mascot and athletic emblem is the Falcon, with the school colors being maroon and white.

The CRA Falcons participate in various interscholastic activities in the 1A Classification within the 1A Region 3 Conference as administered by the Arkansas Activities Association. Girls may participate in volleyball, basketball, track and field, softball, tennis, and cross country. Boys may participate basketball, tennis, track and field, baseball, and cross country. Soccer and golf are also offered, as co-ed sports.

- Volleyball: The Lady Falcons are 7-time state volleyball champions (1997, 1998, 1999, 2000, 2002, 2010, 2017).
- Cross Country: The boys cross country squad won the state cross country championship in 2009.
- Tennis: The boys tennis team won the state tennis championship in 2006.
- Track and field: The boys track teams won three consecutive state track championships in 1994, 1995, and 1996.
