= KIPP: Delta Public Schools =

School district in Helena–West Helena, Arkansas, USA

Location
- 410 Ohio Street; Helena–West Helena, Arkansas 72342 United States

District information
- Type: Public charter
- Grades: Kindergarten (K) – 12
- Accreditation: Arkansas Department of Education
- Schools: 4
- NCES District ID: 05000062

Students and staff
- Students: 640 (2010–11)
- Teachers: 46.01 (on FTE basis)
- Staff: 112.01 (on FTE basis)
- Athletic conference: 1A Region 5

Other information
- Website: www.kippdelta.org

KIPP: Delta Public Schools is a charter school operator supported by the Knowledge Is Power Program (KIPP) based in Helena–West Helena, Arkansas, USA. The system consists of three schools in Phillips County and one facility in Mississippi County.

As of 2018, under an agreement with the State of Arkansas, the schools may enroll no more than 1,100 students each in Blytheville and Helena-West Helena and 400 in Forrest City, for a total limit of 2,600.

== List of schools ==
- KIPP Blytheville Collegiate High School (grades 7-12)
- KIPP: Delta Collegiate High School (grades 9–12) in Helena–West Helena. In 2012, KIPP Delta Collegiate was nationally recognized as a Gold Medalist and was ranked the No. 2 high school in Arkansas, the No. 52 charter school in the US, and the No. 408 overall school in the US by U.S. News & World Report.
- KIPP: Delta College Preparatory School (grades 5–8), in Helena–West Helena. In 2008, KIPP: Delta College Prep School was made a National Blue Ribbon School by the U.S. Department of Education.
- KIPP: Blytheville College Preparatory School (grades K–6), in Blytheville and founded in 2010.
- KIPP: Delta Elementary Literacy Academy (kindergarten–grade 4), in Helena–West Helena and founded in 2009.
  - It was initially on Cherry Street in downtown Helena. In Spring 2017 KIPP Delta bought the former Beechcrest Elementary School in West Helena from the Helena-West Helena School District, and since 2017 the school is located in that campus while the high school moved into the Cherry Street campus. Since the renovation it has two playgrounds.

Circa 2014 KIPP Delta established the grade 5-8 KIPP Forrest City College Preparatory School in Forrest City, which occupied several temporary buildings and a portion of a Catholic church which had a lease agreement with KIPP. In 2018 KIPP Delta asked the State of Arkansas for permission to close KIPP Forest City and send students to the Helena-West Helena facility.

== See also ==
- List of school districts in Arkansas

Other KIPP schools:

- KIPP Houston Public Schools
- KIPP San Antonio Public Schools
- KIPP SoCal Public Schools
