= Haas Hall Academy =

Charter school in Arkansas, US

Location
- 3155 North College Avenue; Fayetteville, Arkansas 72703; United States; 36°6′30.1″N 94°8′45.7″W

Information
- Type: Charter school
- Motto: Every Scholar, Every Day — College Bound!
- Established: 2004 (22 years ago)
- School district: Haas Hall Academy
- CEEB code: 042762
- NCES School ID: 050007801078
- Principal: Martin W. Schoppmeyer
- Teaching staff: 28.50 (on an FTE basis)
- Grades: 7–12
- Enrollment: 466 (2018-2019)
- Student to teacher ratio: 16.35
- Colors: Blue and gold
- Athletics conference: Arkansas Activities Association 3A West Conference
- Mascot: Mastiff
- Nickname: Mastiffs
- Newspaper: Haas Hall Herald
- Yearbook: Veritas
- Website: www.haashall.org

Haas Hall Academy is a charter school in Fayetteville, Arkansas, United States. It was established in 2004.

== Academics ==
Haas Hall Academy's curriculum is an accelerated college preparatory academic program. Accredited by AdvancED and the Arkansas Department of Education (ADE), Haas Hall Academy holds membership in The College Board and the Science National Honor Society. Students engage in coursework including Advanced Placement (AP), courses with concurrent college credit provided a local university (for example, University of Arkansas at Fayetteville), and the school encourages students to take college courses at local colleges and universities. Since its inception in 2004, Haas Hall has achieved Adequate Yearly Progress.

Out of 16,200 schools considered by Newsweek for their America's Top High Schools list, Haas Hall Academy Ranked #19 in the nation.

=== Athletics ===
The Haas Hall Mastiffs participate in various interscholastic activities in the 3A West Conference administered by the Arkansas Activities Association. The school athletic activities include basketball (boys/girls), bowling (boys/girls), cross country (boys/girls), track and field (boys/girls), golf (boys/girls), tennis (boys/girls), soccer (co-ed), and swimming (boys/girls).

=== Clubs and traditions ===
The school's FIRST Robotics Competition team, Apophis 5006, has gone to the FIRST Championship in 2014 and 2015, winning the Rookie All-Star Award in 2014.

== Diversity concerns ==
The Arkansas Board of Education has pressed Haas Hall to address a lack of diversity in their student body.

In April 2019, Haas Hall was allowed by the Arkansas Board of Education to address the issue by attending local festivals and events, advertising, and minority-targeted mailers sent twice yearly.

As of the 2018–2019 school year, 0.0% of Haas Hall students were eligible to receive special education.
