= McGehee High School =

Location
- 1902 East Ash Street; McGehee, Arkansas 71654; United States
- 33°38′43″N 91°23′1″W

Information
- Type: Public secondary
- School district: McGehee School District
- NCES District ID: 0509630
- CEEB code: 041620
- NCES School ID: 050963000705
- Principal: Derrell Thompson
- Faculty: 50.97 (on FTE basis)
- Grades: 7–12
- Enrollment: 503 (2016-17)
- Student to teacher ratio: 10.08
- Campus type: Rural
- Colors: Red and white
- Athletics conference: 3A Region 6 (football); 3A Region 8 (basketball)
- Sports: Football, golf, cheer, dance, basketball, baseball, softball, tennis, track
- Mascot: Owl
- Team name: McGehee Owls
- Newspaper: MHS Beak Speaks
- Yearbook: The Owl
- Affiliations: Arkansas Activities Association
- Website: www.mcgeheeschools.org/schools/mhs

McGehee High School is a comprehensive public secondary school located in McGehee, Arkansas, United States. It serves more than 500 students in grades 7 through 12. McGehee is one of two public high schools in Desha County, and is the sole high school administered by the McGehee School District. The school's sports teams have won 18 state championships.

== Academics ==
The assumed course of study for students is to complete the Smart Core curriculum developed by the Arkansas Department of Education (ADE), which requires students complete at least 22 units for graduation. Course offerings include regular and Advanced Placement classes and exams with opportunities for college credit via AP exam. The school is accredited by the ADE and has been accredited by AdvancED since 1951.

== Athletics ==
The McGehee High School mascot is an owl with the school colors of red and white.

For the 2012–14 seasons, the McGehee Owls participated in the 3A Region 6 (Football) and 3A Region 8 (basketball) conferences as administered by the Arkansas Activities Association. The Owls compete in football, golf (boys'/girls'), basketball (boys'/girls'), cheer, competitive dance, golf (boys'/girls'), baseball, softball, tennis (boys'/girls'), track and field (boys'/girls').

- Football: The Owls football teams have won seven state football championships (1969, 1984, 1987, 1988, 1989, 1998, 1999).
- Golf: The boys' golf teams have won three state golf championships (1966, 1988, 1998).
- Tennis: The boys' tennis teams have won five state tennis championships (1968, 1970, 1980, 1985, 1987).
- Track and field: The boys' track teams have won three state track and field championships (1963, 1987, 1988).
