= Joe T. Robinson High School =

High school in Arkansas

Location
- 21501 Cantrell Road (Hwy 10); Little Rock, Arkansas 72223; United States; 34°48′50″N 92°30′5″W

Information
- School type: Comprehensive public high school
- Established: 1927 (99 years ago)
- Status: Open
- School district: Pulaski County Special School District
- NCES District ID: 0511850
- CEEB code: 041430
- NCES School ID: 051185000923
- Principal: Laconya Isaac
- Teaching staff: 78.04 (on FTE basis)
- Enrollment: 845 (2023-2024)
- Student to teacher ratio: 10.83
- Colors: Black and Vegas gold
- Athletics conference: 4A-4
- Team name: Senators
- Affiliations: Arkansas Activities Association (AAA)
- Website: rhs.pcssd.org

Joe T. Robinson High School is a public high school for students in grades 9 through 12 located in unincorporated Pulaski County, Arkansas, United States, just outside the city limits of Little Rock.

The school was named after then U.S. Senator Joseph Taylor Robinson in 1927 during the same year Pulaski County Special School District (PCSSD) was formed. Robinson High School moved to its current facilities at the start of the 1981–82 school year and in 2010–11 hosted about 500 pupils, the smallest PCSSD high school population. In the 2024-25 school year, the school will host about 970 students. The school is often referred to as “Joe T. Robinson.”

Its service area includes portions of Little Rock, Natural Steps, Roland, Ferndale, and the Pulaski County portion of Alexander.

Laconya Isaac is the school's principal.

== Academics ==
The school is accredited by AdvancED since 1965 and by the ADE (ADE). The assumed course of study is the ADE Smart Core curriculum, which requires 22 units before students graduate. Students complete regular (core and career focus) courses and exams and may select Advanced Placement (AP) coursework and exams that provide an opportunity for college credit before high school graduation.

== Extracurricular activities ==
The Robinson High School mascot is the Senator with black and gold as the school colors. The Robinson Senators compete in a variety of sports including football, basketball, track and field in the 4A-7 Conference (2012–14) administered by the Arkansas Activities Association.

- Football: The Senators football team won state football championships in 1980, 2019, and 2021.
- Basketball: The boys basketball won a state championship in 1987.
- Track and Field: From 1971-1974, the boys track team won four consecutive state track and field championships.
- Girls Tennis: On October 15, 2024, the girls tennis team captured their first state championship in school history, winning the Class 4A State Championship.
- Boys Swimming: On March 1, 2025, the boys swim team captured their first state championship in school history, in their first season as a team, winning the Class 1-4A State Championship.

== Notable people ==
- Nate Garner—American football player in the National Football League
- Michael Tinsley (2003)—Athlete, 2012 London Olympics Silver Medalist, Men's 400 m Hurdles
