= Arkansas Arts Academy High School =

Arkansas Arts Academy

Location
- 506 West Poplar Street; Rogers, Arkansas 72756; United States
- 36°19′53″N 94°7′17″W

Information
- School type: Charter
- Motto: Aspire. Achieve. Advance.
- Established: August 2007 (18 years ago)
- Status: Open
- School board: Arkansas Arts Academy
- School district: Arkansas Arts Academy
- Superintendent: Allison Roberts
- CEEB code: 042169
- NCES School ID: 050005501508
- Principal: Jerrie Price
- Teaching staff: 20.01 (9-12) (on FTE basis)
- Grades: 7–12
- Gender: Co-educational
- Enrollment: 285 (2018)
- Average class size: 15
- Student to teacher ratio: 11
- Education system: ADE Smart Core
- Classes offered: Regular, Advanced Placement (AP)
- Language: English, Spanish
- Hours in school day: 6.1
- Colors: Green, white, and black
- Mascot: Diamonds
- Accreditation: ADE
- Website: www.artsk12.org

Arkansas Arts Academy High School (formerly Benton County School of the Arts High School) is a public charter school located in the city of Rogers, Arkansas. The school provides secondary education focused on artistic and academic programs for students in grades 7 through 12. It is one of nine public high schools in Benton County, one of three charter schools in Northwest Arkansas, and the sole high school administered by the Arkansas Arts Academy, which acts as a school district for the high school and the Arkansas Arts Academy Elementary/Middle School (kindergarten through grade 6).

== History ==
On September 4, 2001, the first day of class for the then Benton County School of the Arts charter school began for students kindergarten through grade 8. Subsequently, in August 2007, the Northwest Arkansas Academy of Fine Arts (NWAAFA) was established for grades 9 through 12. On July 1, 2009, the two schools merged to form the Benton County School of the Arts (BCSA) school district to include the renamed BCSA High School. In 2014, both the high school and elementary/middle school were renamed Arkansas Arts Academy. In 2018, the high school campus was renovated and made much bigger, the only building left untouched being the Performing Arts Center (PAC).

Arkansas Arts Academy has a school board of seven members.

== Academics ==
Arkansas Arts Academy High School is accredited by the Arkansas Department of Education (ADE) and the assumed course of study follows the Smart Core curriculum developed by the ADE, which requires students complete at least 28 units prior to graduation. Students complete regular coursework and exams and may take Advanced Placement (AP) courses and exam with the opportunity to receive college credit.

In 2019, Arkansas Arts Academy High School was listed and ranked #5 in Arkansas Rankings and #530 in National Rankings in the Best High Schools Report developed by U.S. News & World Report.

Arkansas Arts Academy High School is currently listed as the 13th best high school in Arkansas by the ADE.

== Athletics ==
The Arkansas Arts Academy mascot is the Diamonds, changed from the Penguins in March 2018.

The Arkansas Arts Academy Diamonds participate in cross country, archery, and mountain biking.

The school previously competed in Basketball though the team has since been discontinued.
