= Ridgefield Christian School =

Private school in Jonesboro, Arkansas, United States

Location
- 3824 Casey Springs Road; Jonesboro, Craighead, Arkansas 72404; United States
- Coordinates: 35°49′21″N 90°46′21″W

Information
- Funding type: Tuition revenue, private donations
- Religious affiliation: Christianity
- Denomination: Non-denominational
- Founded: 1993
- Status: Open
- School board: Private Board of Directors
- CEEB code: 041271
- NCES School ID: A9500216
- Administrator: Kayla Davidson
- Head of school: Bryan Easley
- Teaching staff: 20
- Grades: PK–12
- Gender: Co-educational
- Enrollment: 143 (2020)
- Average class size: 12.7
- Student to teacher ratio: 7.2
- Campus size: 27 acres
- Campus type: rural
- Colors: Green and gold
- Slogan: Equipping Minds and Shaping Hearts for a Christ-centered Life
- Athletics: Basketball, Volleyball, Golf, Tennis, Bowling, Soccer, Track, Trap, Cheer
- Athletics conference: AAC
- Nickname: Warriors
- Accreditation: ANSAA
- Affiliation: Association of Christian Schools International (ACSI)
- Website: www.ridgefieldchristian.org

Ridgefield Christian School (RCS) is a private, non-denominational Christian school in Jonesboro, Arkansas, United States.

== Demographics ==
According to the National Center for Education Statistics, in the 2019-2020 school year the school had 143 students, 131 or 91.6% of whom were White, 4 or 2.8% Asian, 5 or 3.4% Black, and 3 or 2.1% were Hispanic.
