= Watley =

Watley is a surname. Notable people with the surname include:

- Jody Watley (born 1959), American singer-songwriter
- Michele Evette Watley (born 1968), American pornographic actress and singer
- Natasha Watley (born 1981), American softball player

== Places ==
=== England ===
- Watley's End, a village in South Gloucestershire, England

=== Jamaica ===
- Watley Ave, a city in Kingston, Jamaica

=== United States ===
- Watley Ct, a court in Hoschton, Georgia, United States
- Watley Place Northeast, a place in Hoschton, Georgia, United States

== See also ==
- Wadley
- Whateley (disambiguation)
- Whately (disambiguation)
- Whatley (disambiguation)
- Wheatley (disambiguation)
- Whiteley
- Whitley (disambiguation)
