= Wheatley (surname) =

Wheatley is a toponymic surname derived from an English place name and originating from the Old English words "hwǣte" and "lēah," which translate to "wheat" and "clearing," respectively.

== People ==
- Alan Wheatley, actor
- Andrew Wheatley, Jamaican politician
- Ben Wheatley, animator, director
- Charlie Wheatley (1893–1982), American baseball player and inventor
- Clare Wheatley (born 1971), British football player and administrator
- Dennis Wheatley, author
- Doug Wheatley, comic book artist
- Ethan Wheatley (born 2006), English footballer
- Francis Wheatley (disambiguation), several people
- Glenn Wheatley (1948–2022), Australian musician, talent manager and tour promoter
- Geoffrey W. Wheatley
- Henry B. Wheatley, author
- Jane Wheatley (1881–1935), American stage actress
- Jennie Wheatley (1939–2023), British Virgin Islands writer and historian
- Joan Wheatley, American singer
- Jo Wheatley, winner of The Great British Bake Off (series 2)
- Joe Wheatley, English footballer
- John Wheatley (disambiguation), several people
- Keith Wheatley (born 1946), English cricketer
- Kevin Arthur Wheatley, Australian soldier
- Leon F. Wheatley (1872–1944), New York politician
- Margaret J. Wheatley, management consultant
- Mark Wheatley, comic book artist
- Martin Wheatley, British financier
- Sir Mervyn Wheatley, English politician
- Colonel Moreton John Wheatley, CB, RE (1837–1916), Bailiff of The Royal Parks
- Natalio Wheatley, British Virgin Islands politician
- Ossie Wheatley, English cricketer
- Paul Wheatley (disambiguation), several people
- Peter Jaffrey Wheatley, British chemist
- Phil Wheatley
- Phillis Wheatley, poet
- Rebecca Wheatley, actor
- Ron Wheatley, English footballer
- Thomas Wheatley (1821–1883), English mechanical engineer
- Tyrone Wheatley (born 1972), American football player
- Tyrone Wheatley Jr. (born 1997), American football player
- Vincent Wheatley, British Virgin Islands politician
- Willard Wheatley (1915–1997), Chief Minister of the British Virgin Islands
- William Wheatley (1816–1876), American actor
- William O. Wheatley Jr. (born c. 1944), American TV executive

=== Fictional characters ===
- Nicky Wheatley, a character in the British soap-opera Coronation Street
- Wheatley, a character in the game Portal 2

== See also ==
- List of Old English (Anglo-Saxon) surnames
- Wheat (surname)
- Wheaton (surname)
- Whateley (disambiguation)
- Whately (disambiguation)
- Whatley (disambiguation)
