= Wheat (surname) =

Wheat is an English-language surname.

Notable people with the surname "Wheat" include:

- Alan Wheat (born 1951), American politician
- Alfred Adams Wheat, American judge
- Arthur Wheat (disambiguation), multiple people
- Bill Wheat, American politician
- Brian Wheat (born 1963), American musician
- Carl Irving Wheat, American cartographer
- Carolyn Wheat, American writer
- Chatham Roberdeau Wheat (1826–1852)
- David "Buck" Wheat (1922–1985), American musician
- DeJuan Wheat (born 1973), American basketball player
- James Sanders Wheat, American politician
- Joe Ben Wheat, American archaeologist
- Joseph S. Wheat, American politician
- Ken Wheat (born 1950), American screenwriter, film producer and director
- Larry Wheat (1876–1963), American character actor
- Lee Wheat (1929–2008), American baseball player
- Lloyd F. Wheat (1923–2004), American politician and lawyer
- Mack Wheat (1893–1979), American baseball player
- Mark Wheat, English-born American DJ
- Mike Wheat (born 1947), American judge
- Natasha Wheat (born 1981), American artist
- Roy M. Wheat (1947–1967), American soldier
- Sara Wheat (born 1984), American figure skater
- Summer Wheat, American artist
- Tyrus Wheat (born 1999), American football player
- Warren Wheat (born 1967), American football player
- William H. Wheat (1879–1944), American politician
- Zack Wheat (1888–1972), American baseball player
- Senator Wheat (disambiguation)

== See also ==
=== Similar surnames ===
- Wheatley (surname)
- Wheater (surname)

=== Miscellaneous ===
- Wheat (disambiguation)
