= Palestine High School =

Palestine High School could mean:

- Palestine High School (Illinois), a public school in Palestine, Illinois and Palestine Community Unit School District 3; teams are the Pioneers or Tigers
- Palestine High School (Ohio), a defunct public school in Palestine, Ohio
- Palestine High School (Texas), the current public high school in Palestine, Texas and the Palestine Independent School District; teams are the Wildcats
- Palestine–Wheatley High School, a public school in Palestine, Arkansas and the Palestine–Wheatley School District; teams are the Patriots
- Museum for East Texas Culture, whose historic building was formerly known as Palestine High School

== See also ==
- Education in Palestine#Secondary education for information about high school education in the State of Palestine
- East Palestine High School, a public high school in East Palestine, Ohio
- New Palestine High School, a public high school in New Palestine, Indiana
