= Wheatley =

Wheatley may refer to:

== Places ==
- Wheatley (crater), on Venus
- Wheatley, Ontario, Canada
- Wheatley, Hampshire, England
- Wheatley, Oxfordshire, England
  - Wheatley railway station
- Wheatley, South Yorkshire, England
- Wheatley, now Ben Rhydding, Bradford, West Yorkshire, England
- Wheatley, Calderdale, a place in Calderdale, United Kingdom
- North and South Wheatley, a civil parish in Nottinghamshire, England
- South Wheatley, Cornwall, England
- Wheatley, Arkansas, U.S.
- Wheatley, Western Australia, townsite now commonly known as Donnelly River, Western Australia

== Other uses ==
- Wheatley (surname), including a list of people with the name
- Wheatley (Portal), a character in the video game franchise
- Wheatley Vodka, a brand of Buffalo Trace Distillery
  - Wheatley Vodka Clash, a NASCAR race

== See also ==
- Wheatley High School (disambiguation)
- Wheatley Hills (disambiguation)
- Wheatley School (disambiguation)
- Whately (disambiguation)
