= Kenley Hawk =

American softball player

Personal information
- Born: January 21, 2001 (age 25) Palestine, Arkansas, U.S.
- Height: 5 ft 10 in (1.78 m)

Sport
- Country: USA
- Sport: Softball
- College team: Mississippi State Bulldogs

Kenley Elizabeth Hawk (born January 21, 2001) is an American softball player. She attended Palestine–Wheatley High School in Palestine, Arkansas. She later attended Mississippi State University, where she played college softball on the Mississippi State Bulldogs softball team. In her junior year, Hawk led Mississippi State softball to their first ever super regionals berth in the 2022 NCAA Division I softball tournament super regionals, where they lost to Arizona, 2–0.
