= Whately (surname) =

Whately is a surname, and may refer to:

- Edward Whately (1823–1892), Irish Anglican priest
- Elizabeth Whately (1795–1860) was an English writer and the wife of Richard Whately
- Ellis Whately (1882–1969), English solicitor and cricketer
- Francis Whately, British television producer and director
- Helen Whately, English Conservative Party politician, Member of Parliament (MP) for Faversham and Mid Kent since 2015
- Herbert Whately (1876–1947), English cleric
- Jane Whately (1822–1893), English religious author
- Joseph Whately (1730–1797), English cleric and Gresham Professor of Rhetoric
- Kevin Whately (born 1951), British actor
- Mary Louisa Whately (1824–1889), English missionary in Egypt
- Monica Whately (1889–1960), British suffragist
- Richard Whately (1787–1863), British theologian, logician and political economist
- Robert Whately (1895–1956), Australian politician
- Thomas Whately (died 1772), British politician
- William Whately (1583–1639), English Puritan cleric and author

== See also ==
- Whatley (surname)
- Whateley (surname)
- Wheatley (surname)
