= Pair of incense boxes in the shape of Mandarin ducks =

Pair of incense boxes

Pair of Incense Boxes in the Shape of Mandarin Ducks
- 鴛鴦形蒔絵香合 (Japanese)
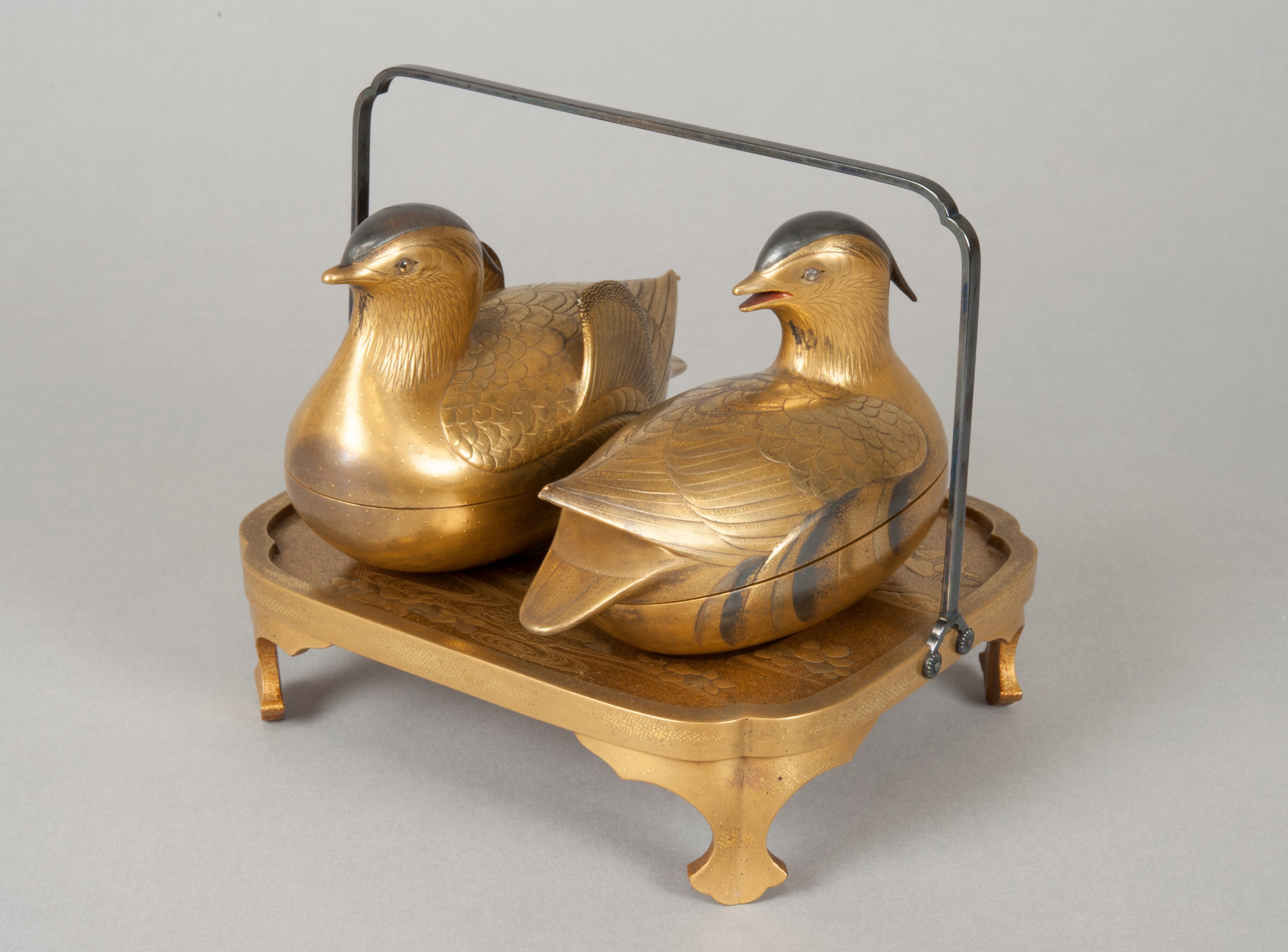
- The pair of ducks set on their tray
- Year: 17th century
- Medium: Lacquer
- Location: Metropolitan Museum of Art; New York

The Metropolitan Museum of Art has a pair of 17th-century Japanese lacquered wood incense boxes in the shape of mandarin ducks in its collection.

== Description ==
The pair of boxes (Kōgō) were used to hold sticks of incense, used in Zen Buddhist ceremonies. The two boxes are shaped like mandarin ducks (Aix galericulata), which were considered symbols of marital bliss and fidelity. Both the ducks and their stand are made from wood covered in gold lacquer. The top of the stand is decorated with groups of pond plants.

The ducks were donated to the Metropolitan Museum of Art as part of the bequest of Benjamin Altman in 1913.

== Gallery ==
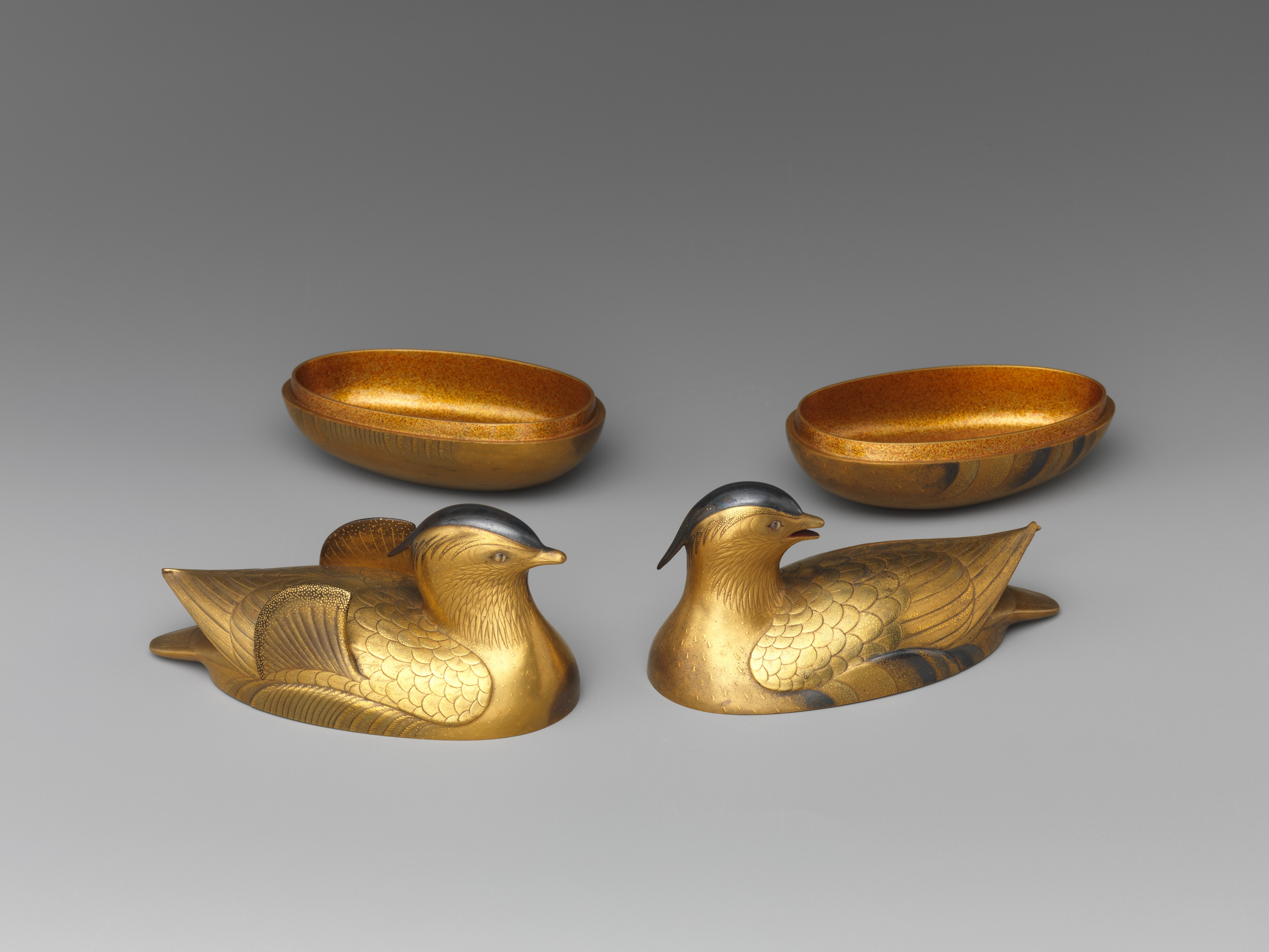
The ducks when opened

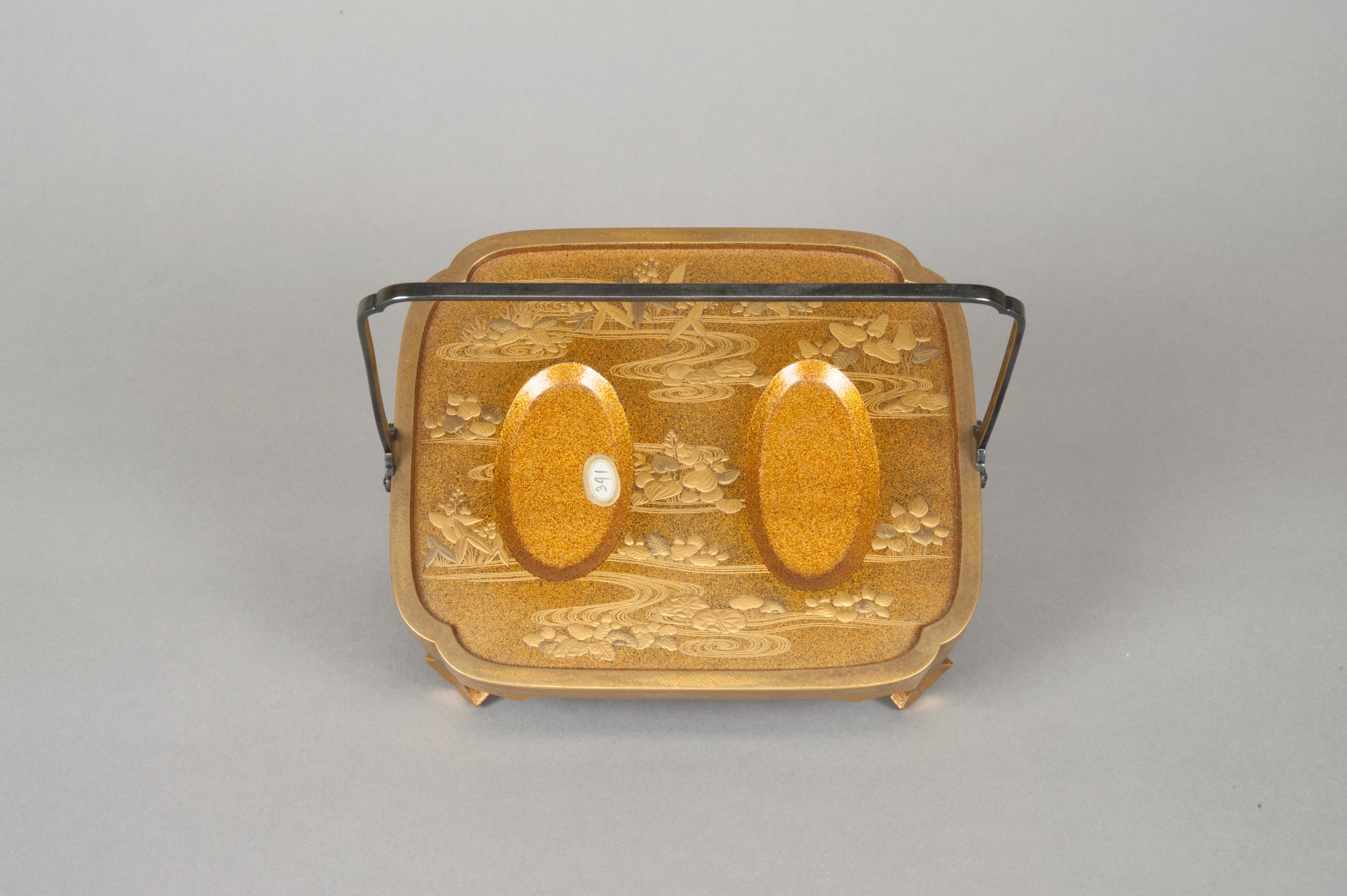
The ducks' tray
