= Whateley =

Whateley may refer to:

== People ==
- Whateley (surname)

== Places and buildings ==
- Whateley, Warwickshire, a location in England
- Whateley Hall, a stately home (now demolished) on the edge of Castle Bromwich, Birmingham, UK, which was a rural village at the time

== See also ==
- Whately (disambiguation)
- Whatley (disambiguation)
- Wheatley (disambiguation)
