= Arthur Wheat =

Arthur Wheat may refer to:

- Arthur Wheat (footballer) (1921–1986), English footballer
- Arthur Wheat (cricketer) (1898–1973), English cricketer
