= Whateley (surname) =

Whateley is a surname, and may refer to:

- Anne Whateley, possibly apocryphal person said to have been William Shakespeare's fiancée
- Darren Whateley, fictional character from the British TV soap Coronation Street
- Gerard Whateley (born 1974), Australian sports commentator
- Jason Whateley (born 1990), Australian boxer
- Leslie Whateley (1899–1987), British army officer, director of the Auxiliary Territorial Service during World War II
- Mary Whateley (1738–1825), English poet and playwright
- Oliver Whateley (1861–1926), English footballer
- William Whateley often William Whately (1583–1639), English Puritan cleric and author
- William Whateley (barrister) (1794–1862), English barrister

== See also ==
- Whately (surname)
- Whatley (surname)
- Wheatley (surname)
