= Wheatfield Township =

Wheatfield Township may refer to the following places in the United States :

- Wheatfield Township, Clinton County, Illinois
- Wheatfield Township, Jasper County, Indiana
- Wheatfield Township, Ingham County, Michigan
- Wheatfield Township, Grand Forks County, North Dakota
- Wheatfield Township, Pennsylvania

There is also:

- East Wheatfield Township, Indiana County, Pennsylvania
- West Wheatfield Township, Pennsylvania

== See also ==
- Wheatfield (disambiguation)
