= Wheate =

Wheate is a surname. Notable people with the surname include:

- Craig P, Wheate (born 1968), Australian Hospitality Professional & Executive Chef
- Sir Thomas Wheate, 1st Baronet (1667–1721), English politician
- Sir Thomas Wheate, 2nd Baronet (1693–1746), English politician

== See also ==
- Wheat (surname)
