= Wadley =

Wadley may refer to:

== Places ==
=== South Africa ===
- Wadley Stadium, an association football stadium

=== United Kingdom ===
- Wadley, County Durham
- Wadley, Oxfordshire, a hamlet in the parish of Littleworth, Vale of White Horse

=== United States ===
- Wadley, Alabama, a town in Alabama
- Wadley, Georgia, a city in Georgia

== Other uses ==
- Wadley (surname)
- Wadley loop
