= Palestine–Wheatley School District =

School district in Arkansas

Location
- 7950 US 70 West; Palestine, Arkansas 72372 United States

District information
- Grades: Pre-K through 12
- Accreditation: Arkansas Department of Education
- Schools: 2
- NCES District ID: 0500051

Students and staff
- Students: 809 (2020–21)
- Teachers: 78.00 (on FTE basis)
- Staff: 104.11 (on FTE basis)
- Student–teacher ratio: 10.37

Other information
- Website: www.pwsd.k12.ar.us

Palestine–Wheatley School District is a public school district based in Palestine, Arkansas, United States. The Palestine–Wheatley School District encompasses 154.20 square miles (399.4 km^{2}) of land including all or portions of St. Francis County and Monoroe County communities including Palestine, Wheatley, Colt, Goodwin, and Brinkley.

The school district provides early childhood, elementary and secondary education for more than 800 prekindergarten through grade 12 at two schools, which are accredited by the Arkansas Department of Education (ADE).

== History ==
It was established by the July 1, 1987 merger of the Palestine School District and the Wheatley School District.

In 1966 the St. Francis County School District merged into the Palestine School District.

== Schools ==
- Palestine–Wheatley High School (Palestine)—grades seven through 12.
- Palestine–Wheatley Elementary School (Palestine)—prekindergarten through grade six.
