= Wheatfield =

Wheatfield and similar terms may refer to:

== Art ==
- The Wheat Field, a group of paintings by Vincent Van Gogh of an enclosed wheat field in Saint-Rémy, France
- The Wheat Field (Constable), an 1816 painting by John Constable
- Wheatfield — A Confrontation, a 1982 conceptual artwork in Manhattan by Agnes Denes
- Wheat Fields, a series of paintings by Vincent Van Gogh over his career
- Wheat Fields (Ruisdael), a painting by Jacob van Ruisdael

== Locations, geographical features etc. ==
=== United States ===
- The Wheatfield, site of fierce fighting during the second day of the Battle of Gettysburg
- Wheatfield, Indiana, a town
- Wheatfield (Ellicott City, Maryland), a historic home
- Wheatfield, New York, a town
  - Niagara-Wheatfield Central School District
- Wheatfield, Virginia, an unincorporated community
- Wheatfield Fork Gualala River, a stream in the mountains of California

=== Elsewhere ===
- Wheatfield, Oxfordshire, England, civil parish and deserted village
- Wheatfield Prison, Dublin, Ireland

== Other ==
- A field where wheat is grown
- Wheatfield Jr. Blades, an American junior ice hockey team based in Wheatfield, New York
- Wheatfield Soul, an album released in 1968 by the Canadian rock band The Guess Who
- Wheatfield (band), an Americana group also known as St. Elmo's Fire

== See also ==
- "Running through fields of wheat", a comment by Theresa May (British Prime Minister)
- Wheat (disambiguation)
