= Wheatley School =

Wheatley School may refer to:

in Canada

- Wheatley School, St. Catharines, an independent elementary school in Ontario, Canada

in the United Kingdom

- Wheatley Park School, a secondary school in Holton, Oxfordshire, England

in the United States

- Wheatley Public School, Poplar Bluff, Missouri, United States
- Phillis Wheatley Elementary School, New Orleans, Louisiana, United States
- The Wheatley School, a public high school in Old Westbury, Long Island, New York, United States
- Wheatley High School (Houston) (full name Phillis Wheatley High School), a secondary school in Houston, Texas, United States

== See also ==
- Bablake School, an independent school in Coventry, England, who alumni are known as "Old Wheatleyans" after principal benefactor Thomas Wheatley
