= Virgin and Child with Saint Anne (Dürer) =

1519 painting by Albrecht Dürer

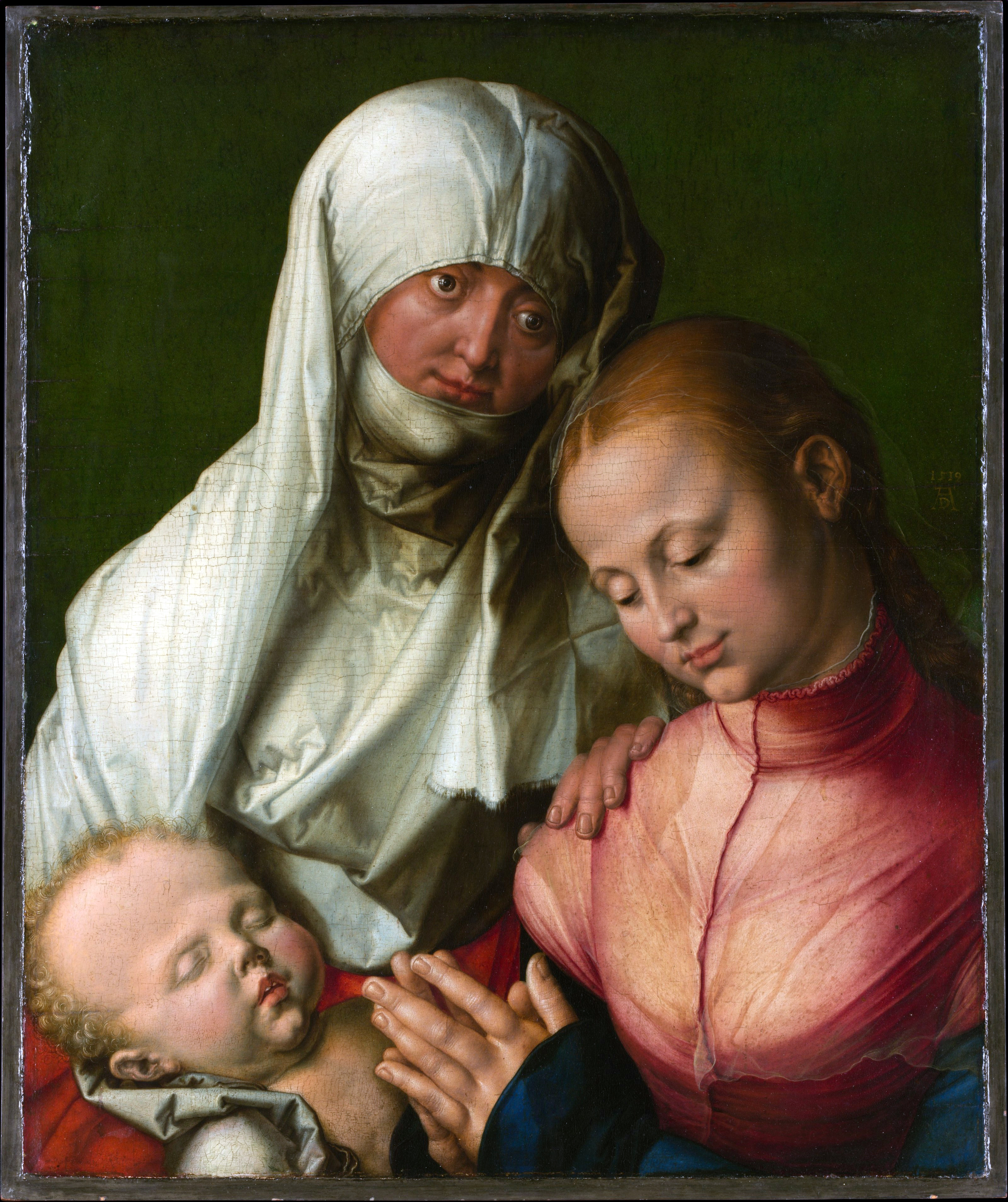
Virgin and Child with Saint Anne (1519) by Albrecht Dürer

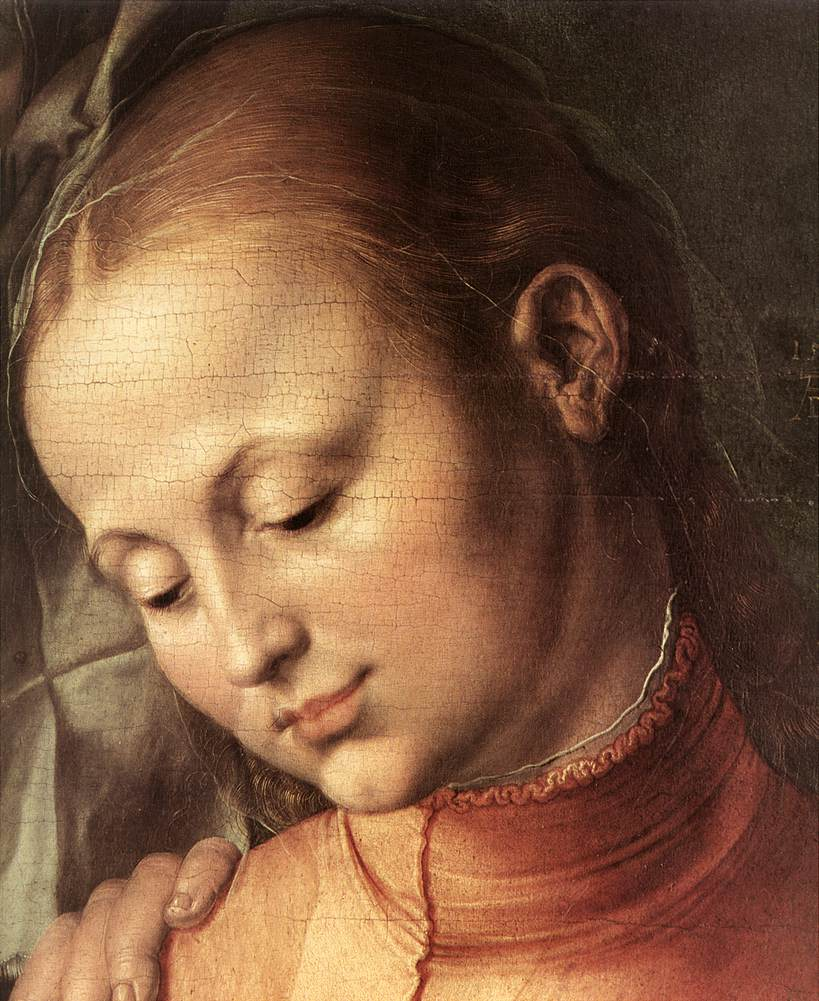
Detail

Virgin and Child with Saint Anne is a tempera and oil painting by Albrecht Dürer. It is signed and dated 1519 in the centre of the right border, though this may have been added later. Originally painted on panel, it was later transferred onto canvas and is now in the Metropolitan Museum of Art in New York.

== History ==
It belonged to Gabriel Tucher of Nuremberg - he and his family were committed supporters of the artist. A preparatory sketch for the work survives in the Albertina in Vienna, possibly dating to 1519 and showing St Anne (modelled on the painter's wife Agnes) painted in grey with highlights on a dark background. In the painting she wears a bonnet closed under her chin, then very much in fashion in Nuremberg.

In 1630 Maximilian I, Elector of Bavaria acquired it and it was displayed in Schloss Schleißheim until the mid 19th century. Repainting and its poor state of conservation led to its being sold from the Bavarian collections as merely a copy after Dürer and - after passing through private collections in Munich and Odessa - it reached the United States. There it was acquired by Benjamin Altman, who donated it to its present owner. Subsequent restorations have restored its status as an autograph work by the artist.

== Other versions ==
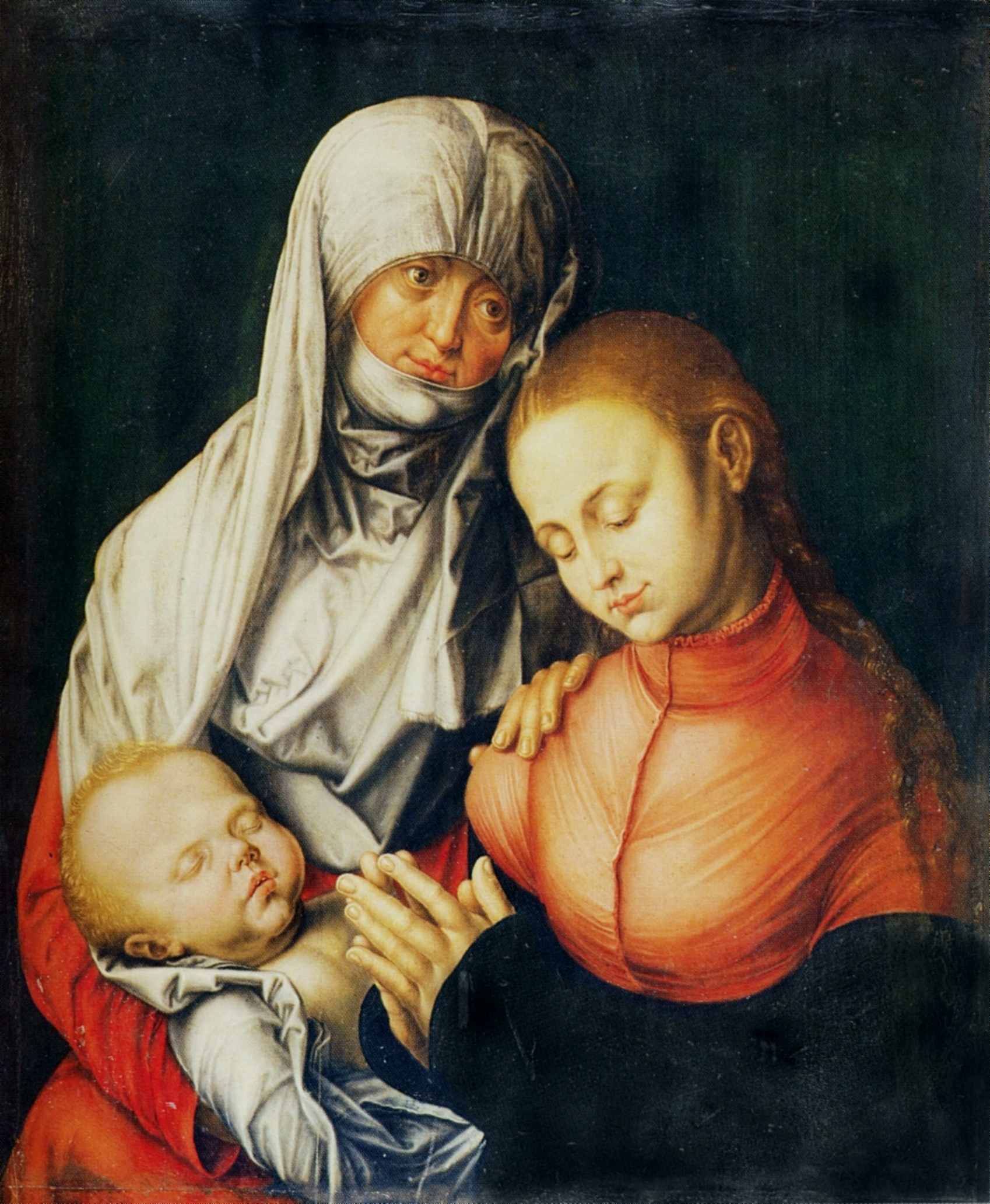
Museum of John Paul II Collection copy

Museum of John Paul II Collection in Warsaw has different version of this painting from 1523, which is also considered as artist's own work.

== See also ==
- List of paintings by Albrecht Dürer
