= Arthur Wheat (footballer) =

English footballer

Personal information
- Full name: Arthur Bradley Wheat
- Date of birth: 6 October 1921
- Place of birth: Selston, Nottinghamshire, England
- Date of death: 18 January 1986 (aged 64)
- Height: 5 ft 7 1/2 in (1.71 m)
- Positions: Half-back; inside forward

Senior career*
Years	Team	Apps	(Gls)
- Montrose
1949–1952	Bradford Park Avenue	22	(3)
1952–1953	York City	4	(0)
1953–	Montrose		
Total		26	(3)
- * Club domestic league appearances and goals

Arthur Bradley Wheat (26 October 1921 – 18 January 1986) was an English professional footballer who played as a half-back or as an inside forward in the Football League for Bradford Park Avenue and York City, and in Scotland for Montrose. His father, also called Arthur Wheat played county cricket for Nottinghamshire.
