= Self-Portrait (Dou, New York) =

Painting by Gerard Dou

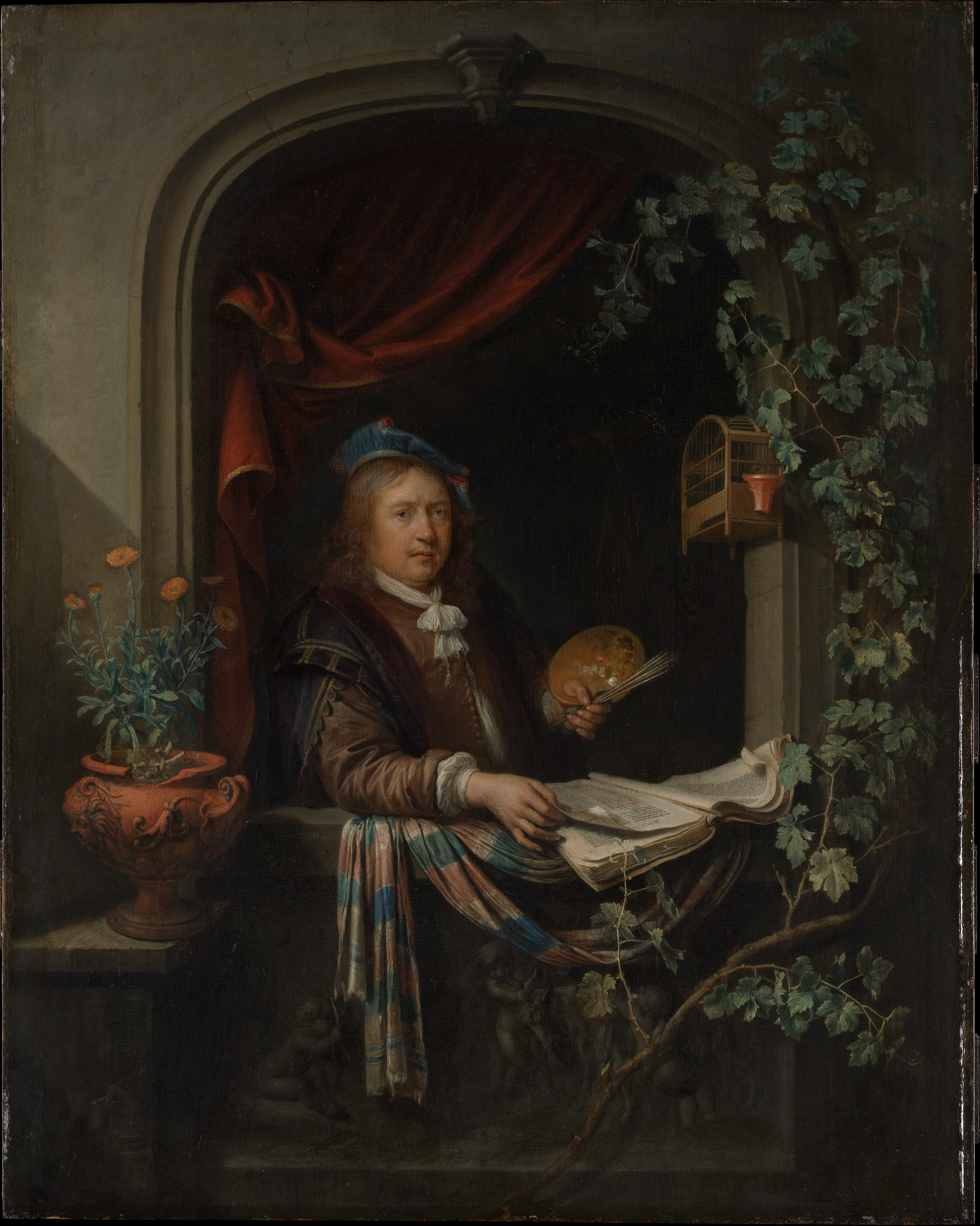
- Artist: Gerrit Dou
- Year: c. 1665
- Medium: Oil paint, panel
- Dimensions: 48.9 cm (19.3 in) × 39.1 cm (15.4 in)
- Location: Metropolitan Museum of Art
- Accession: 14.40.607

Self-Portrait is a 1665 niche painting by Gerrit Dou. It shows the artist at the peak of his fame, holding a palette and surrounded by studio objects. It is in the collection of the Metropolitan Museum of Art, in New York.

== Description ==
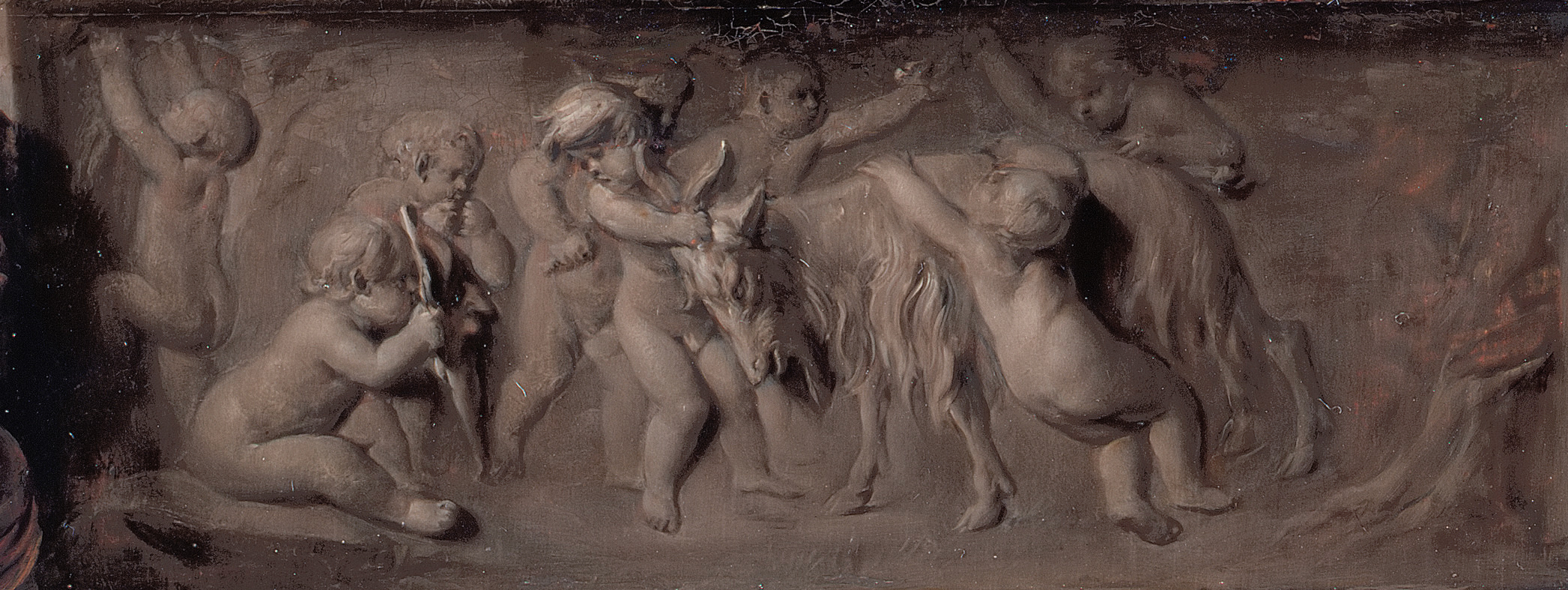
Grisaille of the relief by Duquesnoy

Like his teacher Rembrandt before him, Dou created several self-portraits, probably on commission for specific patrons who owned more than one of his works. Today about a dozen are known. This one came into the collection via the Benjamin Altman bequest.

This painting by Dou was documented by Hofstede de Groot in 1908, who wrote; "283. Portrait of the Painter. Sm. 101 and Suppl. 60; M. 112. He stands at a window, holding palette and brushes in his left hand, and turning over with his right the leaves of a large book lying on the sill. He looks about forty. He wears a brownish vest with sleeves, a dark blue cloak embroidered with gold lace, and a light blue cap. A curtain hangs over the window-sill, partly covering the well-known relief by Duquesnoy of children playing with a he-goat, which is underneath the window. In the foreground is a pot of marigolds. A vine grows over one side of the window, where is hung a bird-cage. In the background is an easel with an open umbrella on the top. "A very beautiful and interesting picture " (Sm.). Blanc states wrongly that it was on canvas, measuring 28 inches by 23 1/2 inches.

The relief by Duquesnoy was used several times by Dou in other niche paintings:

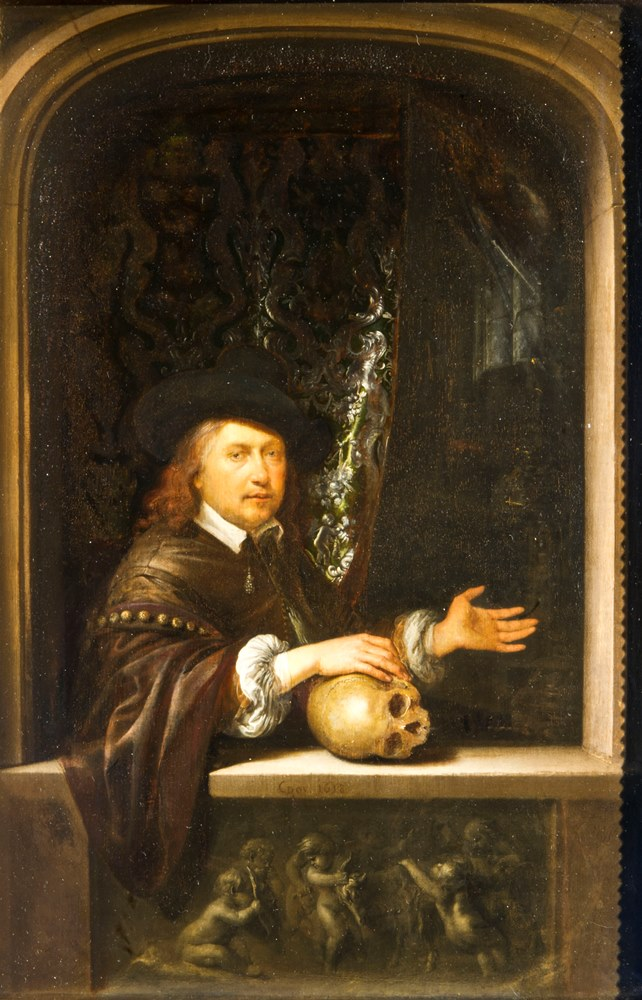

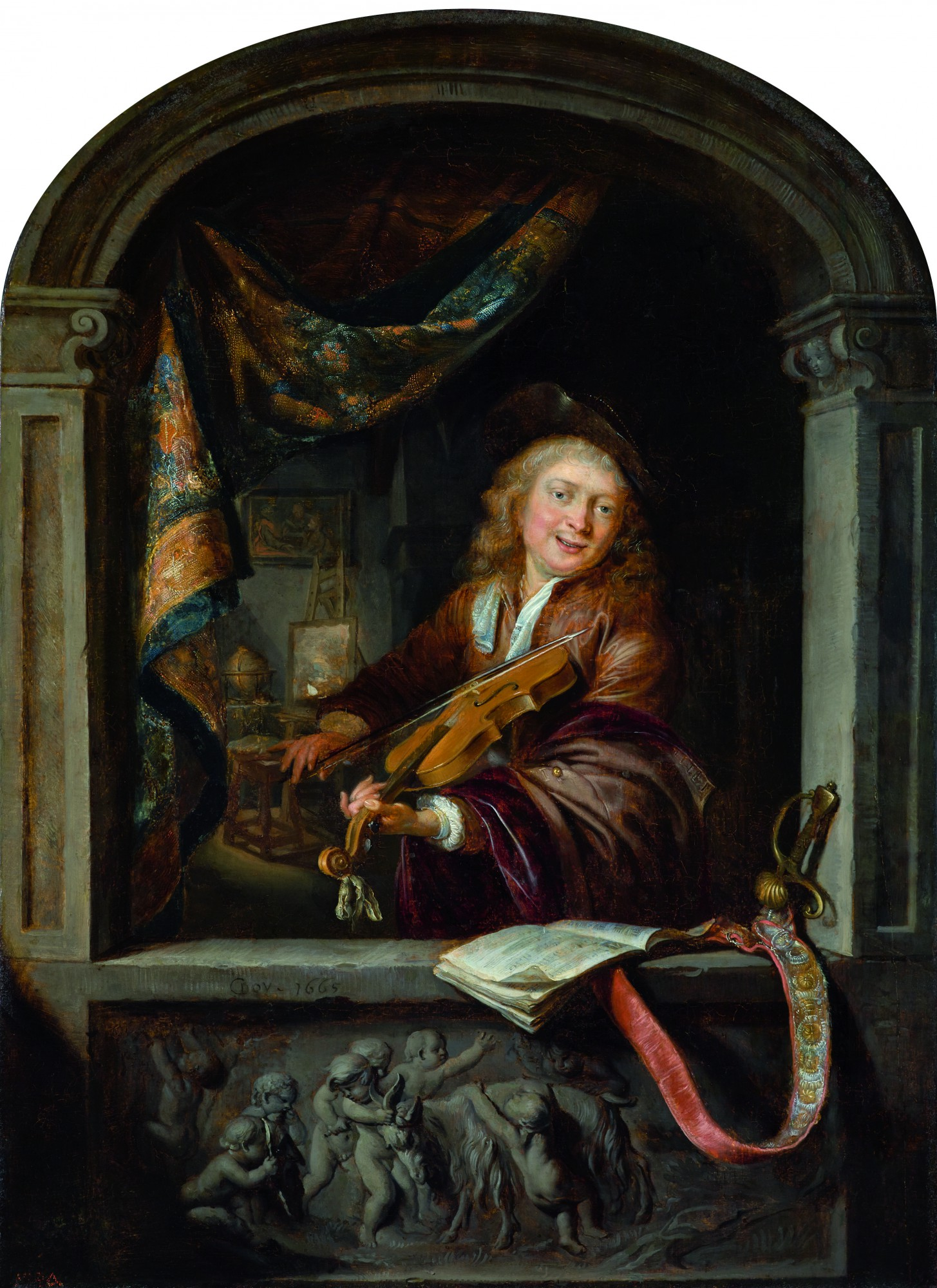

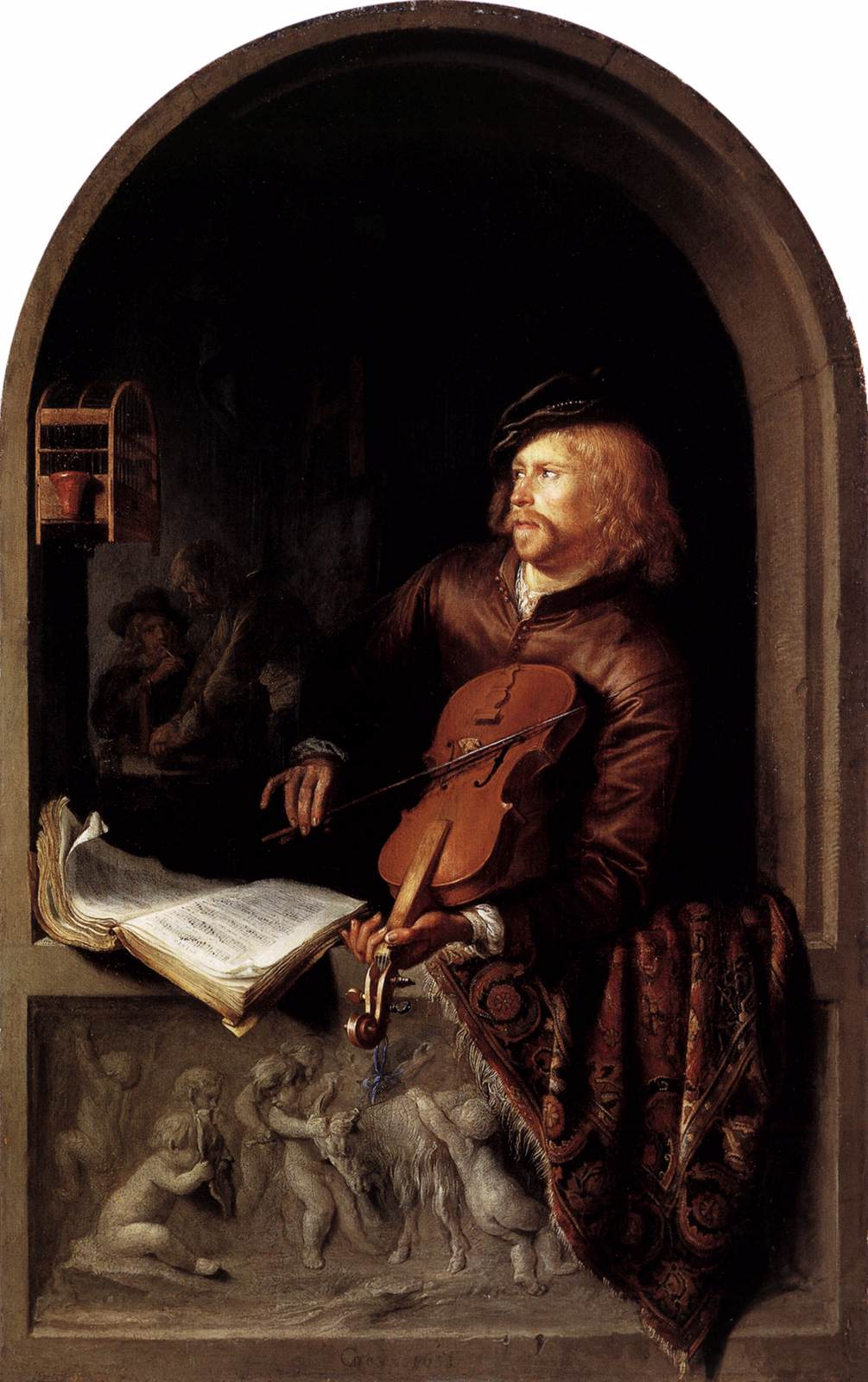

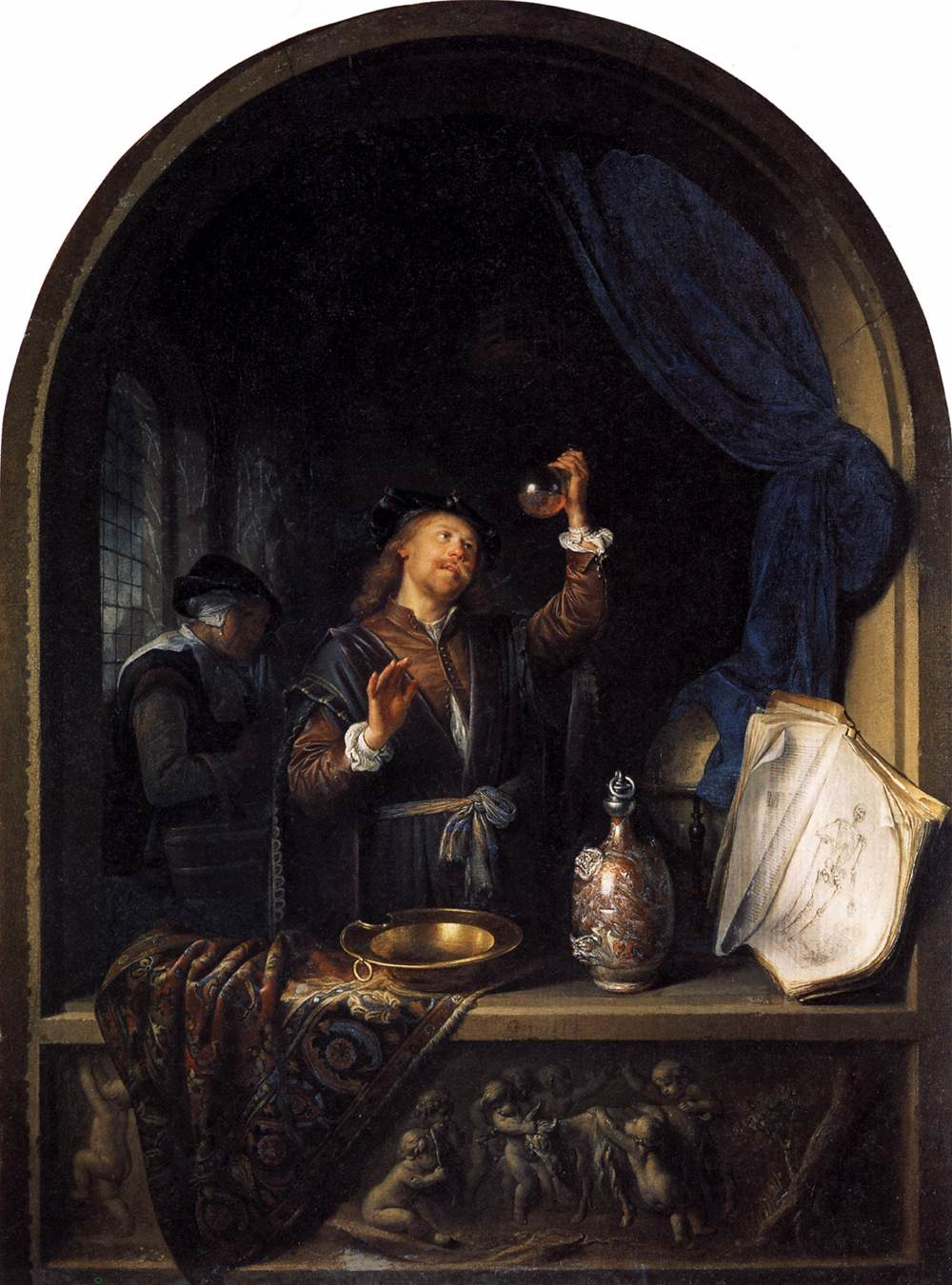

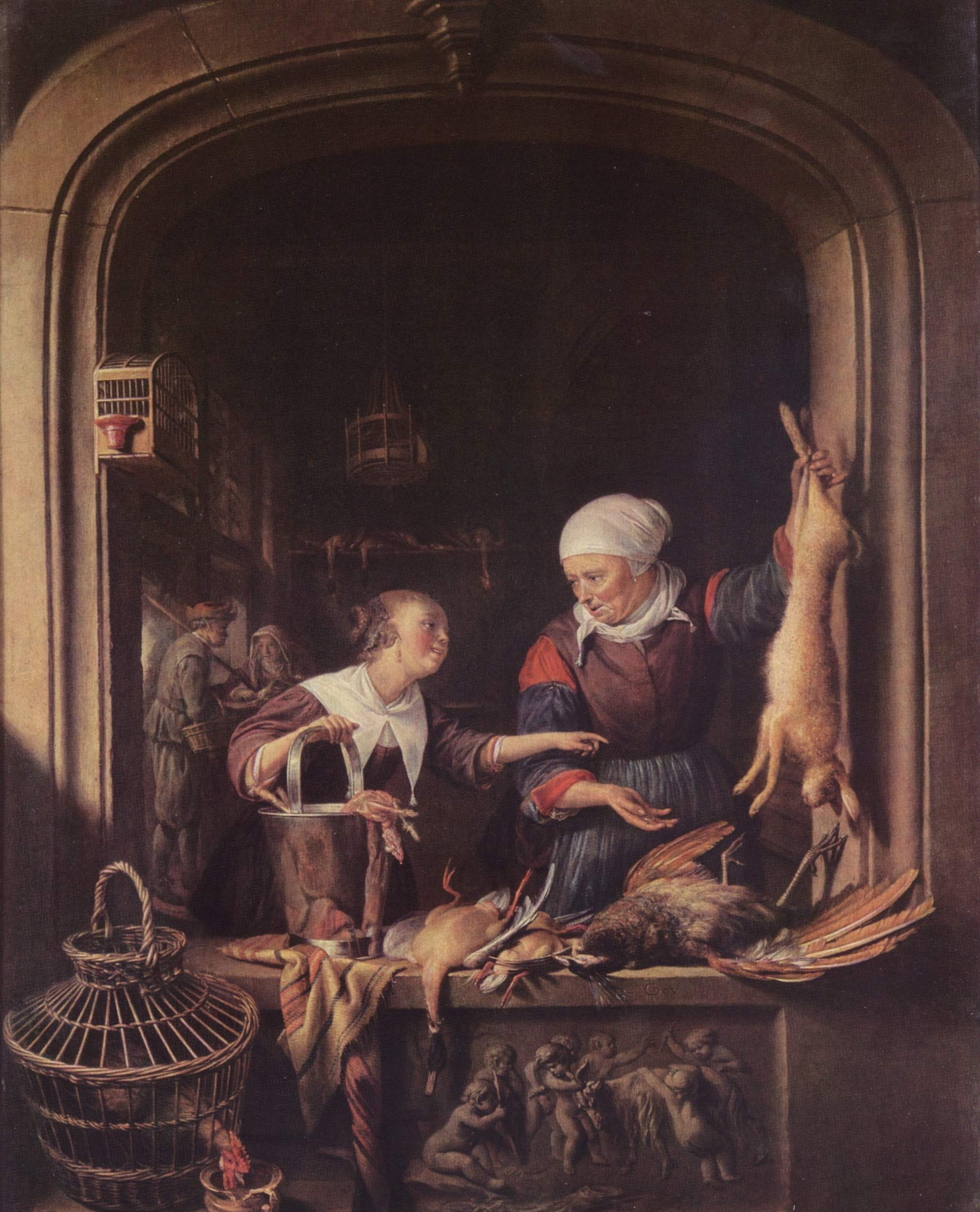

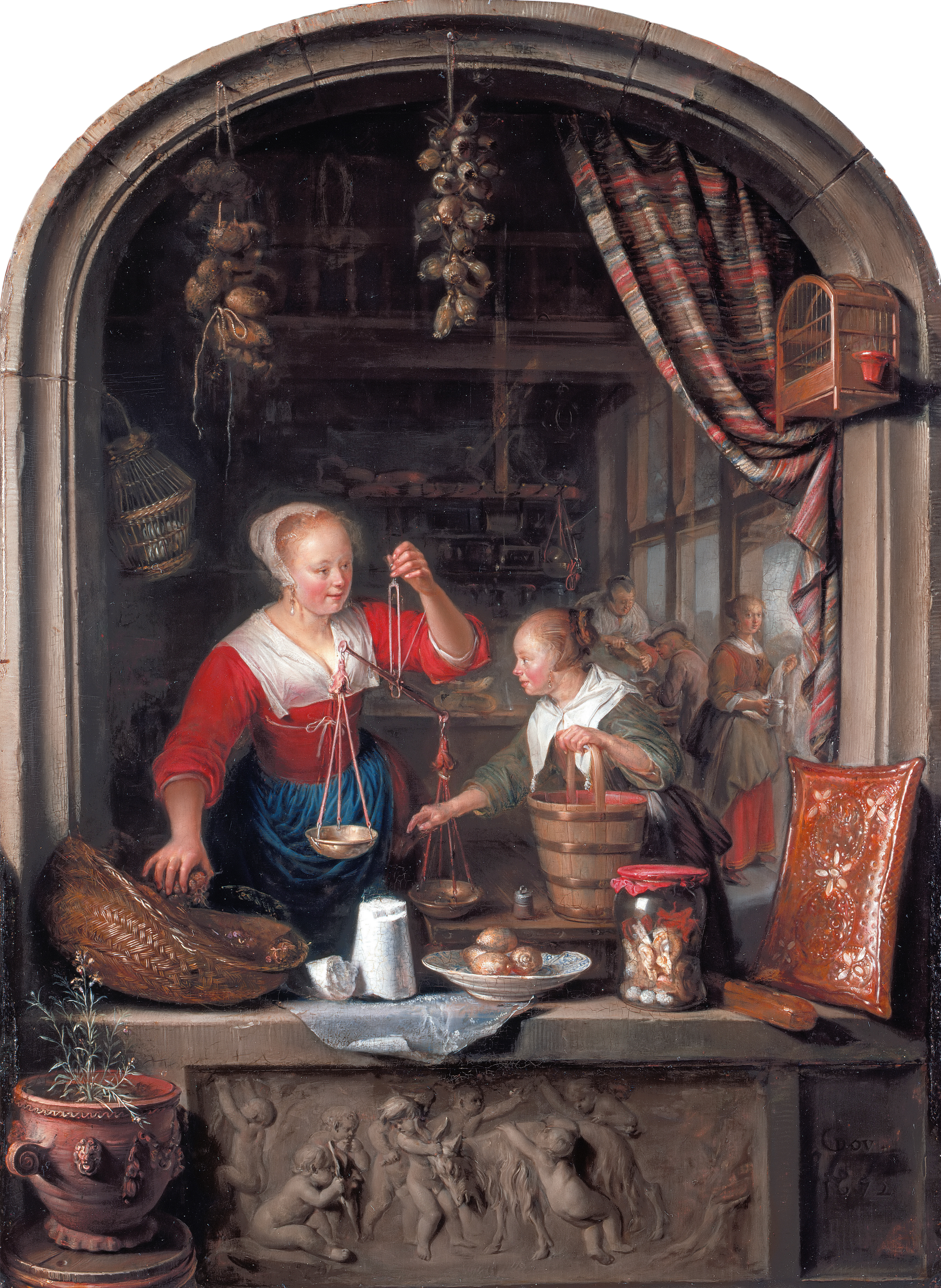

== Later influence ==
This painting was copied by Etienne Compardel, and perhaps it is this version that was used as an example by Jacob Houbraken for his father's dictionary of painters. Arnold Houbraken admired Dou so much he started his second volume of painter biographies called the Schouburgh with his biography, calling him with his contemporary Bartholomeus van der Helst "two guiding lights in the arts" and illustrating their portraits with two burning wicks.

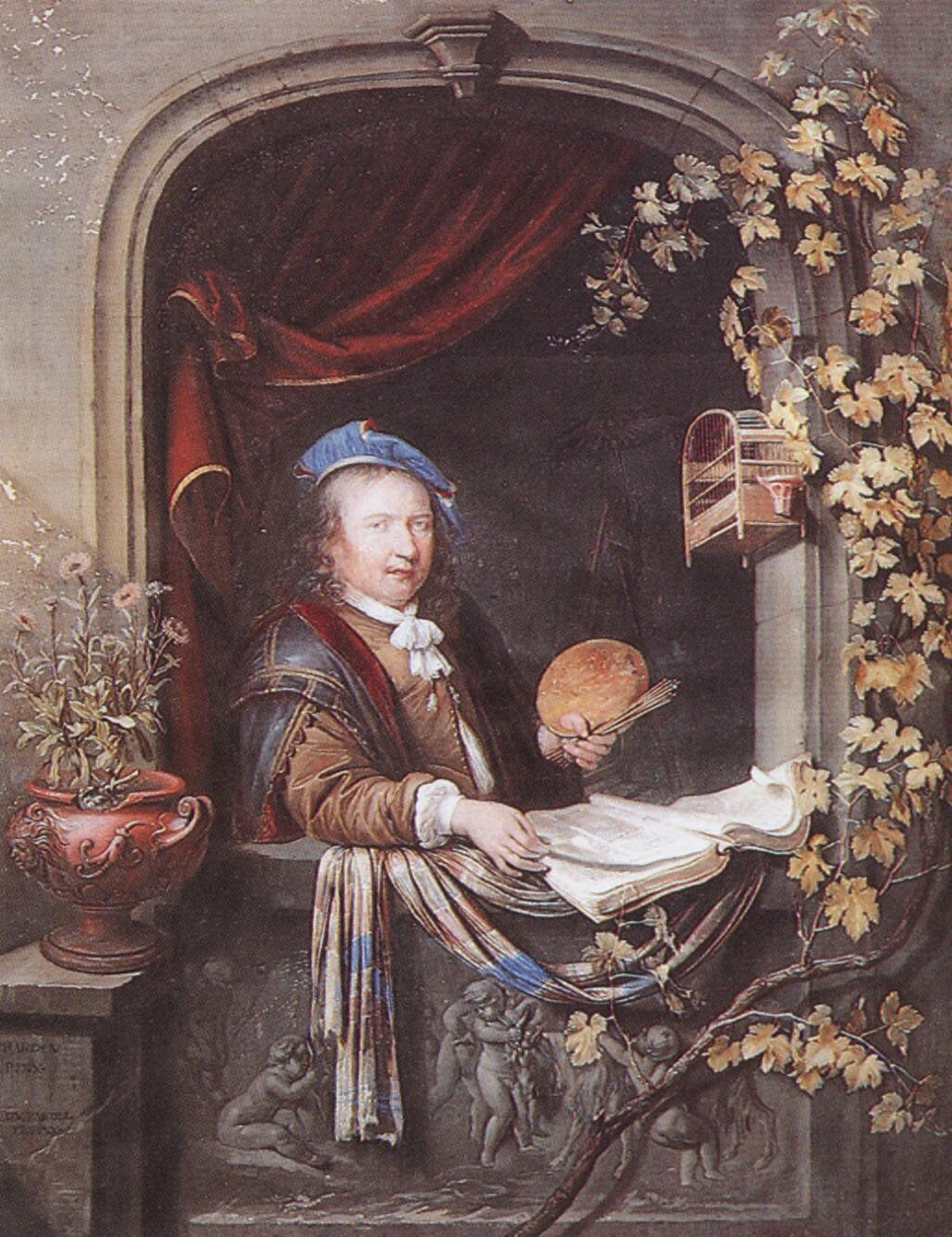
Miniature copy by Compardel

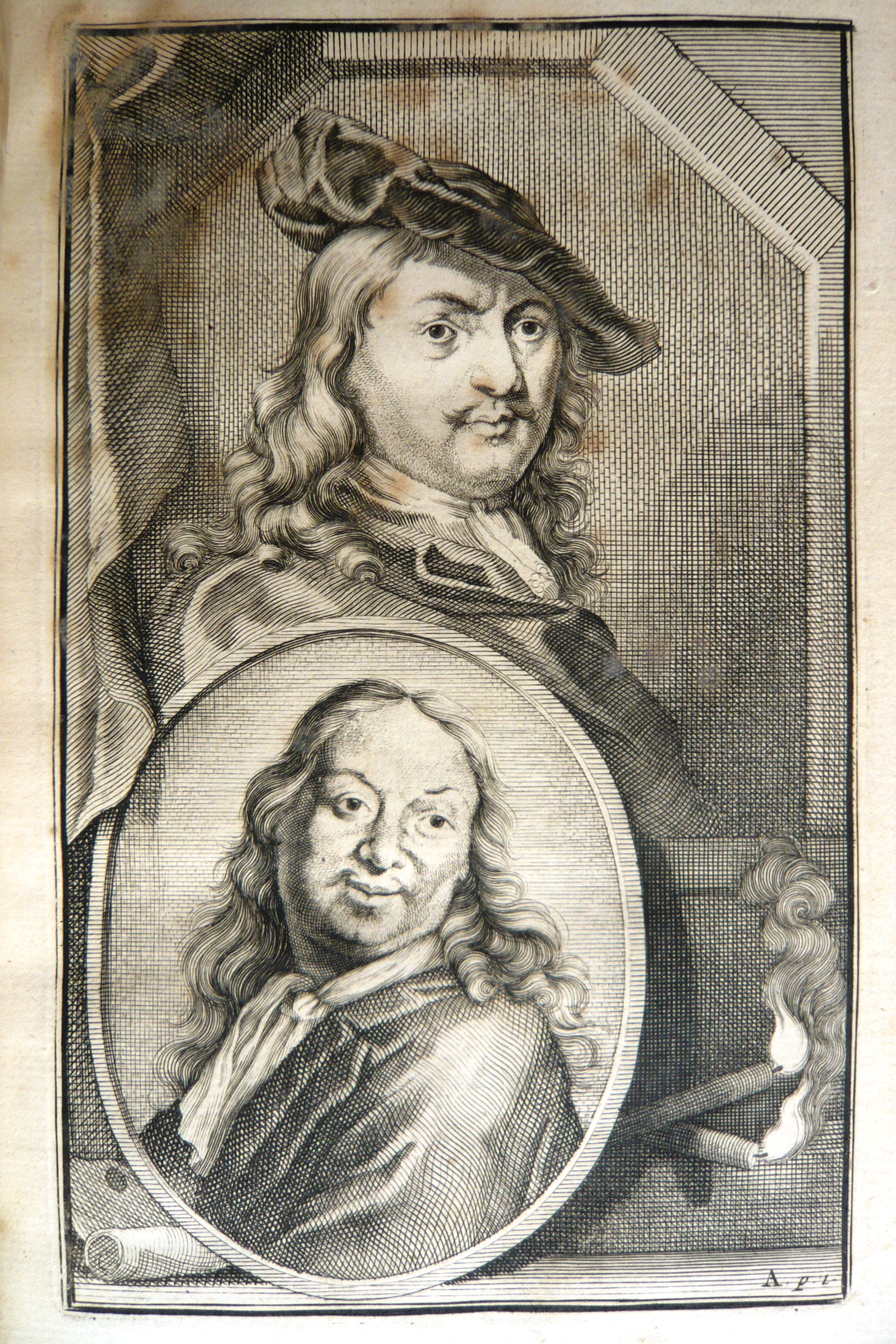
Portraits of Dou and Van der Helst by Jacobus Houbraken
