= Goodwin, Arkansas =

- Census-designated place
- Location within Arkansas Location within the United States
- Coordinates: 34°56′28″N 91°00′04″W
- Country: United States
- State: Arkansas
- County: St. Francis
- Elevation: 207 ft (63 m)

Population (2020)
  - Total: 113
- Time zone: UTC-6 (Central (CST))
  - Summer (DST): UTC-5 (CDT)
- ZIP code: 72340
- Area code: 870
- GNIS feature ID: 2805648

Goodwin is an unincorporated community and census-designated place (CDP) in St. Francis County, Arkansas, United States. It was first listed as a CDP in the 2020 census with a population of 113. Goodwin is located along U.S. Route 70, 5.5 miles (8.9 km) east-northeast of Wheatley. Goodwin has a post office with ZIP code 72340.

== Demographics ==
Historical population
Census	Pop.	Note	%±
2020	113		—
U.S. Decennial Census; 2020

=== 2020 census ===
Goodwin CDP, Arkansas – Racial and ethnic composition Note: the U.S. census treats Hispanic/Latino as an ethnic category. This table excludes Latinos from the racial categories and assigns them to a separate category. Hispanics/Latinos may be of any race.
Race / Ethnicity (NH = Non-Hispanic)	Pop 2020	% 2020
White alone (NH)	40	35.40%
Black or African American alone (NH)	71	62.83%
Native American or Alaska Native alone (NH)	0	0.00%
Asian alone (NH)	0	0.00%
Pacific Islander alone (NH)	0	0.00%
Some Other Race alone (NH)	0	0.00%
Mixed Race or Multi-Racial (NH)	1	0.88%
Hispanic or Latino (any race)	1	0.88%
Total	113	100.00%
