= Portrait of a Man (Titian, New York) =

1512 painting by Titian

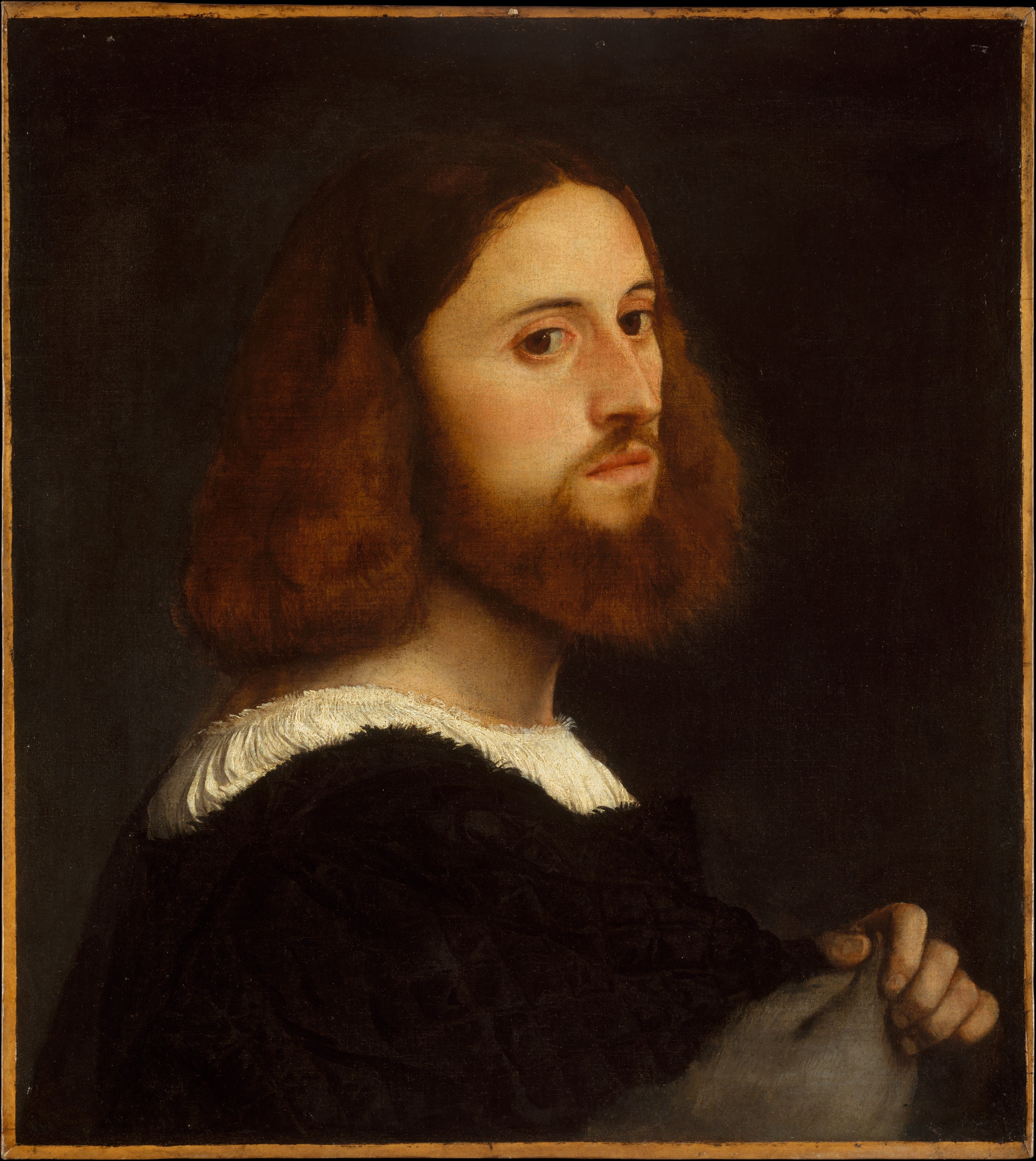
- Artist: Titian
- Year: c. 1512
- Type: painting
- Medium: Oil on canvas
- Dimensions: 50,2 cm × 45,1 cm (198 in × 178 in)
- Location: Metropolitan Museum; New York

Portrait of a Man is an oil on canvas painting by Titian, dating to c. 1512. Wilhelm von Bode attributed it to Giorgione and Jean Paul Richter to Palma il Vecchio, but Roberto Longhi, William Suida, Claude Phillips, Antonio Morassi, Rodolfo Pallucchini and Terisio Pignatti all attributed it to Titian.

Owned by the Grimani family in Venice, it passed through various owners, including W. Savage in London and Benjamin Altman in New York, who bequeathed it to the Metropolitan Museum in New York City in 1913.

== See also ==
- List of works by Titian

== Bibliography ==
- Francesco Valcanover, L'opera completa di Tiziano, Rizzoli, Milano 1969.
