= Wadley (surname) =

Wadley is a surname. Notable people with the surname include:

- Akrum Wadley (born 1995), American football player
- Jock Wadley (1914–1981), English journalist
- Louise Wadley, Australian film director
- Lyn Wadley, South Africa Archaeology
- Marie Wadley (1906–2009), American co-founder
- Nicholas Wadley (1935–2017), British art critic
- Preston Wadley (born 1952), American multimedia artist
- Robert Wadley (1925–2004), American politician
- Shangela Laquifa Wadley (born 1980), American drag queen
- Susan Snow Wadley (born 1943), American anthropologist
- Trevor Wadley (1920–1981), South African electrical engineer
- Veronica Wadley (born 1952), British journalist
- William Morrill Wadley (1813–1882), American train driver
