= Oval Portrait of a Woman (Rembrandt, New York) =

1633 painting by Rembrandt

Portrait of a Woman
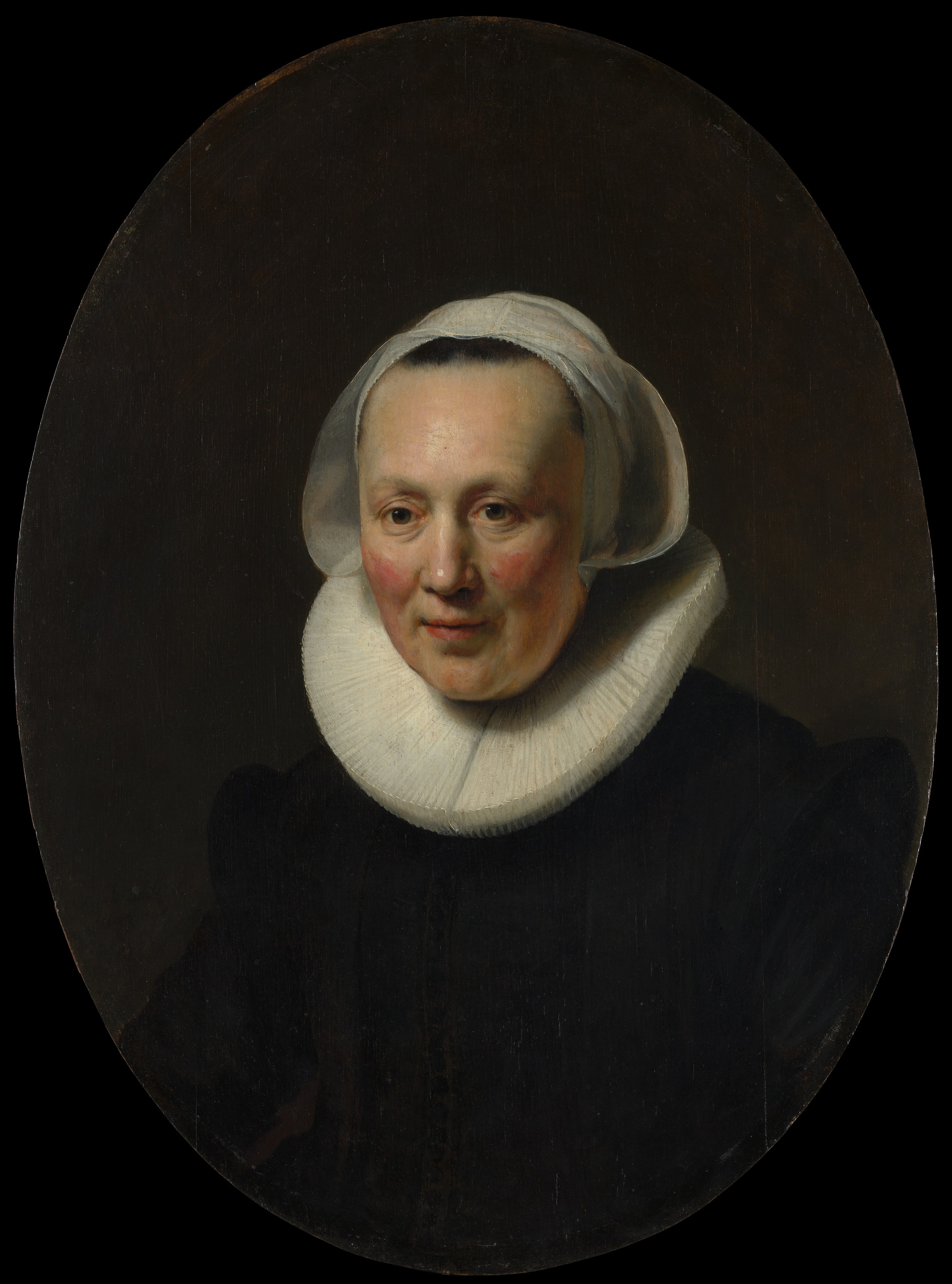
- Artist: Rembrandt
- Year: 1633
- Medium: oil paint
- Dimensions: 67.9 cm (26.7 in) × 50.2 cm (19.8 in)
- Location: Metropolitan Museum of Art
- Owner: Benjamin Altman
- Accession No.: 14.40.625
- Identifiers: RKDimages ID: 35004; The Met object ID: 437390

Oval Portrait of a Woman is a 1633 portrait painting painted by Rembrandt. It shows a woman with a millstone collar and diadem cap. It is in the collection of the Metropolitan Museum of Art.

== Description ==
Several oval portraits of women of 17th-century Amsterdam have survived. Some are pendants and others are individual portraits. This painting has been attributed to Rembrandt since the 19th-century, but the name of the sitter is unknown. This painting came into the collection via the Benjamin Altman bequest.

This painting was documented in 1914 by Hofstede de Groot, who wrote:

867. A WOMAN WITH A WHITE CAP AND RUFF. B.-HdG. 561. Half-length, without hands; life size. She is seen almost in full face, looking at the viewer. She is in black. Dark background. The light falls from the left at top.

Signed to the left above the shoulder, "Rembrandt f. 1633"; oval oak panel, 26 1/2 inches by 20 inches. In the collection of Prince Radziwill, at the castle of Nieswiz, Lithuania. Sale. Lachnicki, Paris, June 15, 1867. In the Lachnicki collection, Warsaw. In the possession of F. Kleinberger, Paris.

In the collection of B. Altman, New York; bequeathed as a whole in 1913 to the Museum. In the Metropolitan Museum, New York.

Other notable oval portraits of women of North Holland from the same period are:

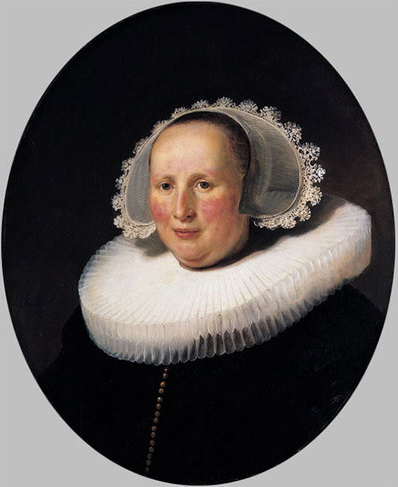
Portrait of Maertgen Bilderbeecq, 1633 by Rembrandt

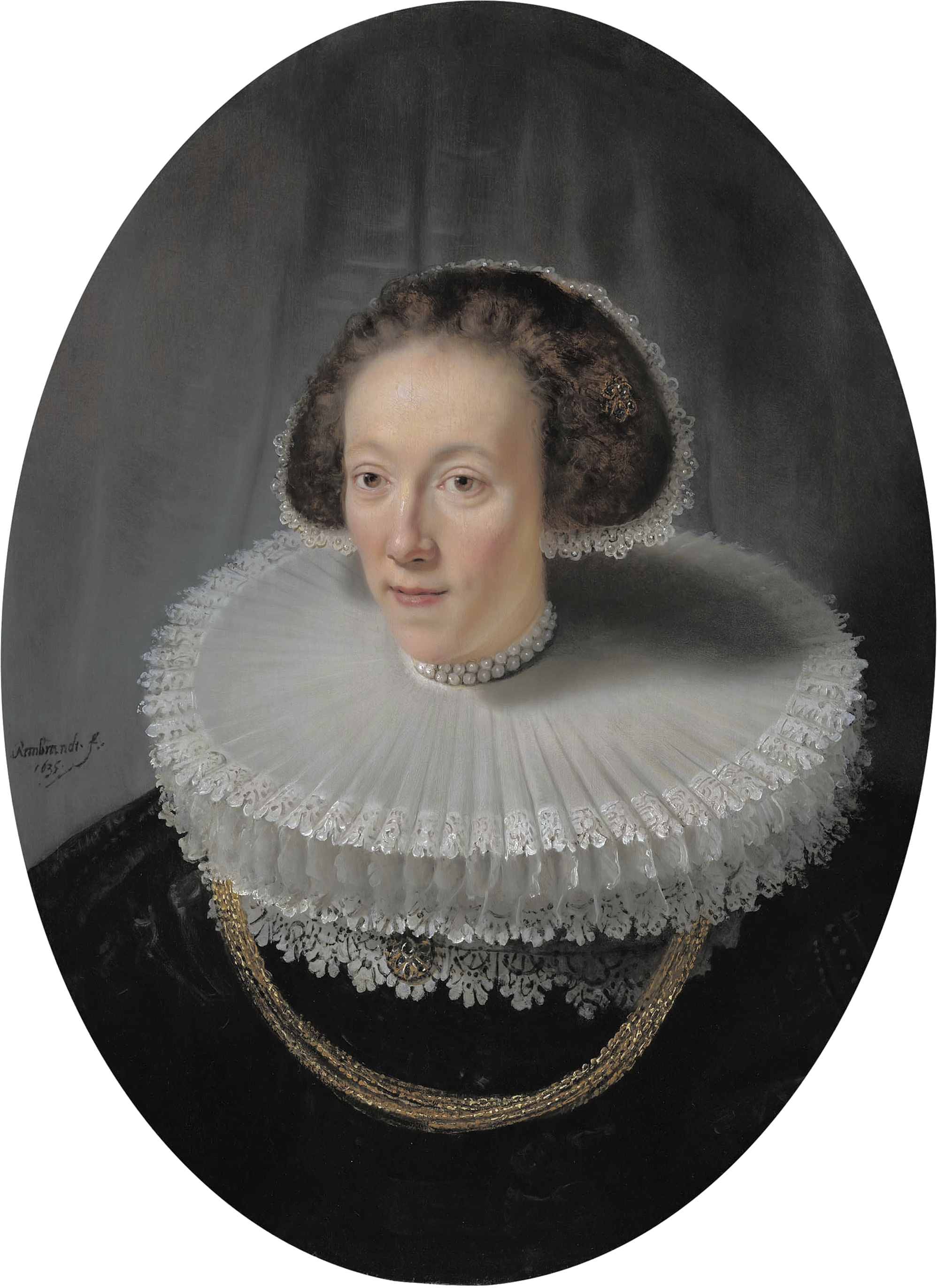
Portrait of Petronella Buys, 1635 by Rembrandt's workshop

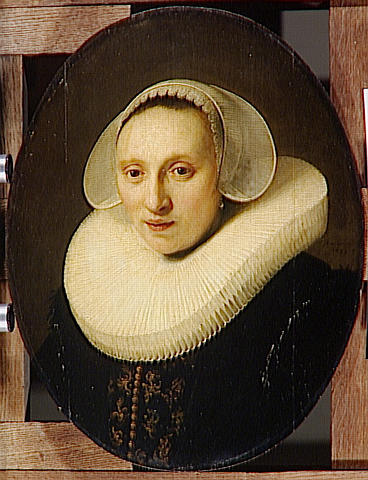
Portrait of Cornelia Pronck, 1633 by Rembrandt

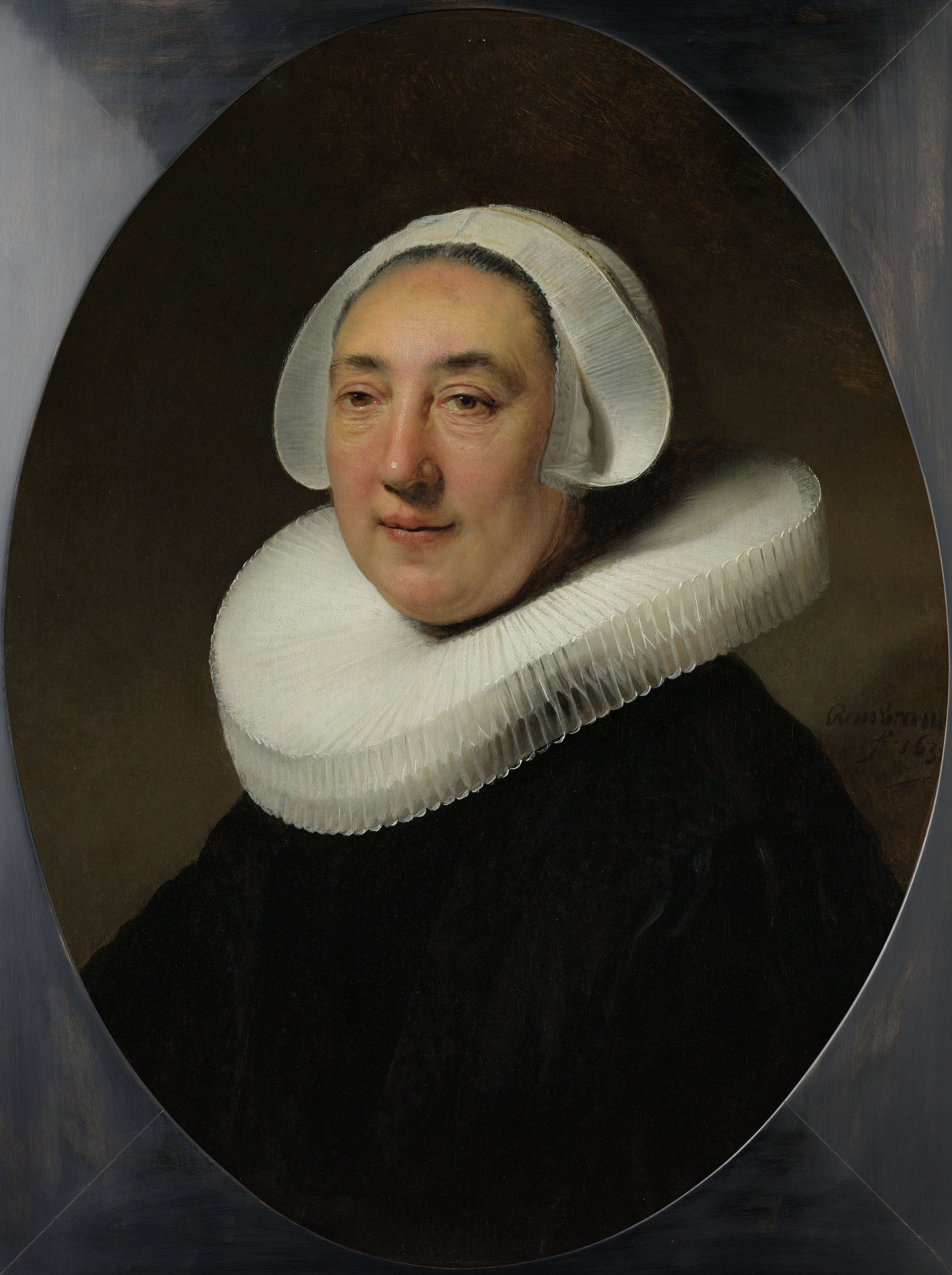
Portrait of Haesje van Cleyburg, dated 1634 by Rembrandt

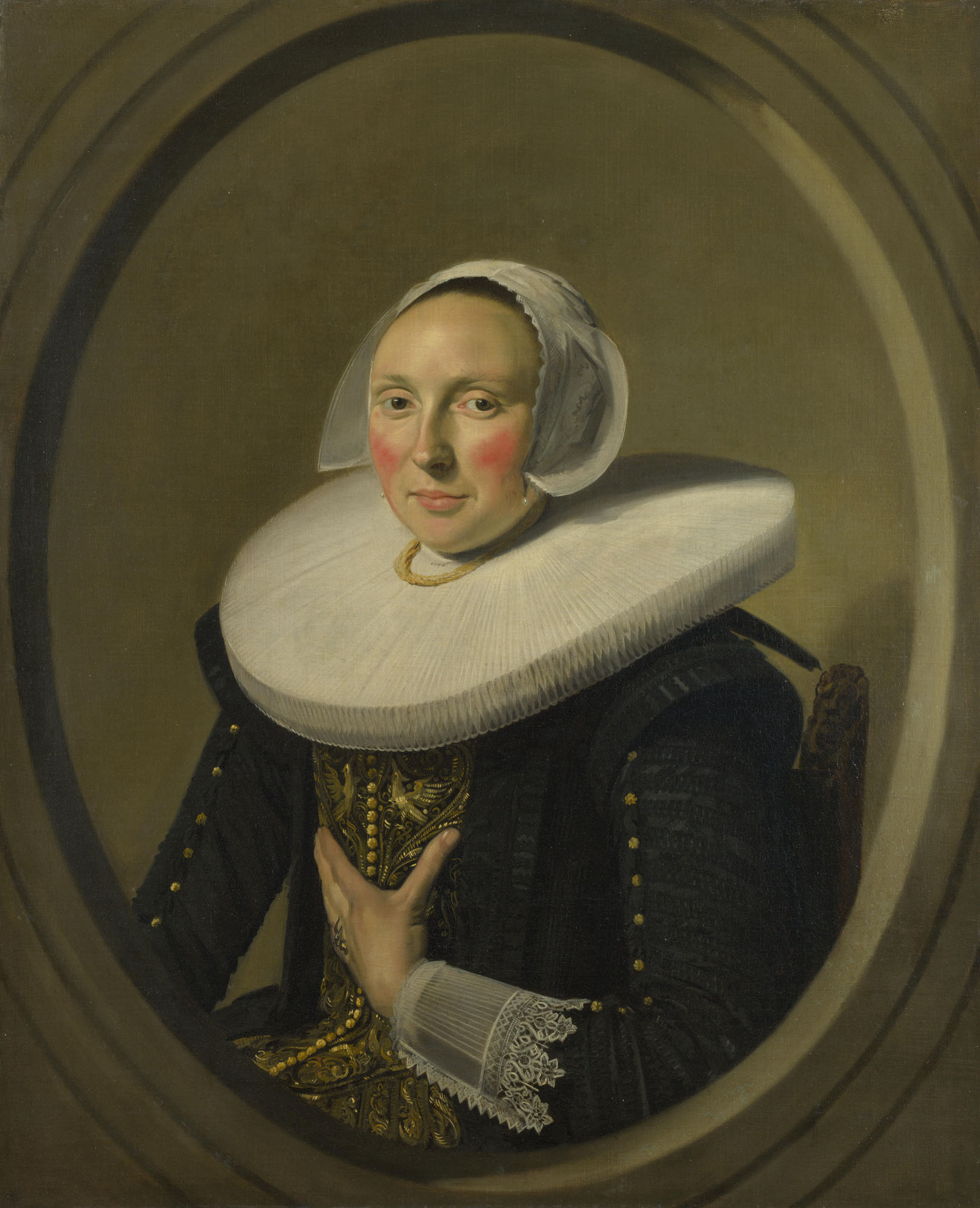
Portrait of Maria Larp, 1635-1638 by Frans Hals

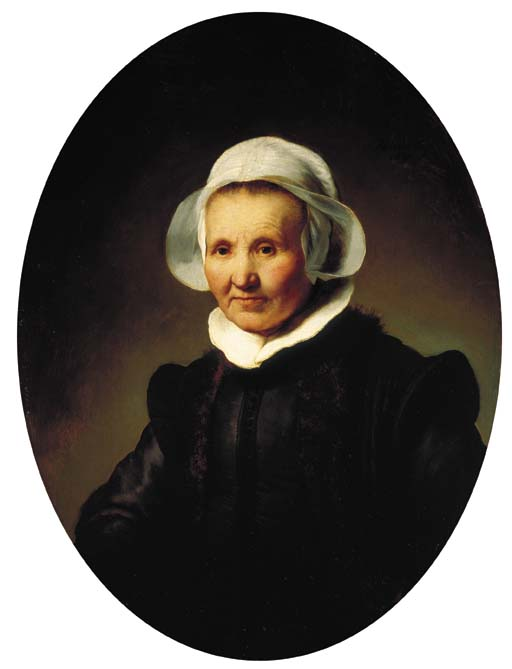
Portrait of a 62-year-old Woman, 1632 by Rembrandt

== See also ==
- List of paintings by Rembrandt

== Bibliography ==
- Cat. no. 145 in Dutch Paintings in the Metropolitan Museum of Art Volume I, by Walter Liedtke, Metropolitan Museum of Art, 2007
