= Wheatley High School =

Wheatley High School may refer to:

- The Wheatley School
- Wheatley High School (Houston)
- Palestine–Wheatley High School, located in Palestine, Arkansas; replaced the former Wheatley High School (Pirates) when local school districts merged in the late 1980s
- Brackenridge High School, San Antonio, Texas, known as Phillis Wheatley High School 1974–1988
