= Senator Wheat =

Senator Wheat may refer to:

- Bill Wheat (fl. 2020s), Louisiana State Senate
- Lloyd F. Wheat (1923–2004), Louisiana State Senate
- Mike Wheat (born 1947), Montana State Senate
