= Wheat (disambiguation) =

Wheat is a grass widely cultivated for its seed, a cereal grain which is a worldwide staple food.

Wheat may also refer to:

- Wheat (surname)
- Wheat (band), indie rock band
- Wheat (color), a color resembling the color of wheat grain
- Wheat, Tennessee, a former community, United States
- Wheat, West Virginia, an unincorporated community, United States
- Wheat (film), a Chinese movie
- "Wheat (poem)", a 1913 poem by C. J. Dennis

== See also ==
- Thinopyrum intermedium, an intermediate wheatgrass
- WEAT, a radio station licensed to the West Palm Beach, Florida market
- Wheat., legal citation abbreviation for Henry Wheaton in U.S. Supreme Court reports
- Wheatfield (disambiguation)
