= Jane Wheatley =

American actress (1881–1935)

Jane Wheatley (1881 – February 17, 1935) was an actress of the American stage. In private life her name was Mrs. Galway Herbert.

== Theatrical performer ==
Wheatley was a member of the Theatre Guild companies for many years and performed with Ethel Barrymore and Lynn Fontanne. In May 1911, she joined the summer stock company at the Murat Theater in Indianapolis, Indiana. She first appeared at the Murat in late May in the title role of "Barbara Frietchie." She also appeared in the Murat summer stock productions "Mary Jane's Pa" (with Lillian Sinnott as Mary Jane), "The Great John Ganton," "Arizona," "Wildfire," "The Prisoner of Zenda," and "Mrs. Temple's Telegram." (1911 Indianapolis Star: May 28, 29, 30; June 2, 4, 13, 18, 22, 24, 25, 27, 28; July 7, 8, 12, 18, 22; August 5)

While in Indianapolis, Wheatley married actor Galway Herbert on June 6, 1911, in a simple ceremony before a justice of the peace. They had been engaged for two years. "Mr. Herbert came here soon after the stock company season opened, and one day we just ran down to the squire's office and were married," Wheatley told the Indianapolis Star. "No one in the company knew of marriage except Mr. [Leslie] Kenyon and Miss Lillian Sinnott, who 'stood up' with us." (Indianapolis Star, July 8, 1911).

In December 1919 Wheatley played the role of Mary in The Wayfarer. It is considered a modern passion play. The production began a short season at Madison Square Garden in New York, New York. The drama drew on impressions of World War I along with the social despair which had continued for ages of the Christian era. The play also featured Blanche Yurka and J. Harry Irving.

== Last days ==
Her final appearance on Broadway came in October 1932. She played the role of Maud Mockridge in Dangerous Corner, a play adapted from the writing of J.B. Priestley.

Jane Wheatley died in 1935 at the Memorial Hospital, 2 West 106th Street, New York City. She was 54 years old. Her funeral services were held at the Funeral Church on Broadway (Manhattan) and Sixty-Sixth Street. Miss Wheatley's husband was in England and was notified of her death.
