= Preston Wadley =

Artist from Seattle, Washington)

- Born: Los Angeles, California
- Education: University of Washington
- Occupation: Artist
- Style: multimedia art
- Website: http://www.prestonwadley.com

Preston Wadley (born 1952 in Los Angeles, CA) is an American multimedia artist based in Seattle, Washington.

== Early life and education ==
Wadley moved to Seattle from his hometown of Los Angeles to study with Jacob Lawrence. He received a BFA and MFA in painting from the University of Washington. After school he worked as a medical photographer at Seattle Children's Hospital.

== Career ==
Wadley's artwork is similar to sculptural assemblage, embedding photographs in bronze casts of books. His work explores complexities around American history and symbols of social psychology. He has taught at Cornish College of the Arts since the mid-1990s. Wadley was one of the figures depicted in Gary Hill's Tall Ships installation.

His work has been exhibited in solo exhibitions at Cornish College of the Arts in Seattle, WA, Schneider Gallery in Chicago, IL, Blue Sky Gallery in Portland, OR, the Center for Photography at Woodstock, Woodstock, NY, and Henry Art Gallery Seattle, WA. His work has been included in many group exhibitions including at Bainbridge Island Museum of Art.

He won a New Works award from En Foco NYC, a National Endowment for the Arts Goodwill Festival Award, and was an artist in residence at the Center for Photography at Woodstock.
