= Wheater =

Wheater is a surname. Notable people with the surname include:

- Adam Wheater (born 1990), English cricketer
- Charles Wheater (1860–1885), English cricketer
- David Wheater (born 1987), English footballer
- Joe Wheater (1918–2000s), British sport shooter
- John Denby Wheater (1921–1985), British Great Train Robbery accomplice
- John F. Wheater, English particle physicist

== See also ==
- Wheatear, a genus of passerine birds
