= Wheatley, Arkansas =

- Town
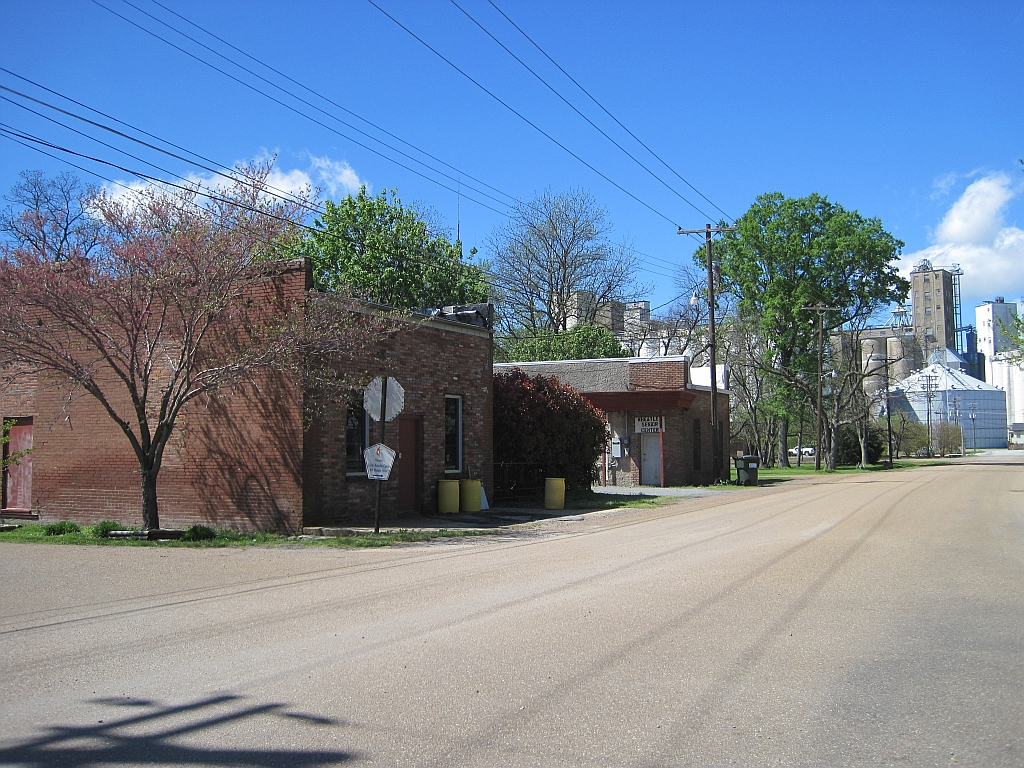
- Streetside in Wheatley

- Location of Wheatley in St. Francis County, Arkansas.
- Coordinates: 34°55′31″N 91°07′01″W
- Country: United States
- State: Arkansas
- County: St. Francis

Area
  - Total: 3.07 sq mi (7.95 km^{2})
  - Land: 3.07 sq mi (7.95 km^{2})
  - Water: 0 sq mi (0.00 km^{2})
- Elevation: 210 ft (64 m)

Population (2020)
  - Total: 279
  - Estimate (2025): 259 ▼
  - Density: 90.8/sq mi (35.07/km^{2})
- Time zone: UTC-6 (Central (CST))
  - Summer (DST): UTC-5 (CDT)
- FIPS code: 05-74840
- GNIS feature ID: 2405726

Wheatley is a town in southwest St. Francis County, Arkansas, United States. The population was 279 at the 2020 census, down from 355 in 2010.

== Geography ==
According to the United States Census Bureau, the city has a total area of 3.2 square miles (8.3 km^{2}), all land.

== Demographics ==
Historical population
Census	Pop.	Note	%±
1880	100		—
1910	330		—
1920	477		44.5%
1930	305		−36.1%
1940	362		18.7%
1950	406		12.2%
1960	443		9.1%
1970	507		14.4%
1980	523		3.2%
1990	413		−21.0%
2000	372		−9.9%
2010	355		−4.6%
2020	279		−21.4%
2025 (est.)	259	▼	−7.2%
U.S. Decennial Census

Wheatley racial composition as of 2020 (NH = Non-Hispanic) (Note: Note: the US Census treats Hispanic/Latino as an ethnic category. This table excludes Latinos from the racial categories and assigns them to a separate category. Hispanics/Latinos can be of any race.)
Race	Number	Percentage
White (NH)	186	66.67%
Black or African American (NH)	65	23.3%
Mixed/Multi-Racial (NH)	15	5.38%
Hispanic or Latino	13	4.66%
Total	279	

As of the 2020 United States census, there were 279 people, 191 households, and 152 families residing in the city.

As of the census of 2000, there were 372 people, 151 households, and 109 families residing in the city. The population density was 117.3 inhabitants per square mile (45.3/km^{2}). There were 175 housing units at an average density of 55.2 per square mile (21.3/km^{2}). The racial makeup of the city was 69.35% White, 29.30% Black or African American, 0.54% Native American, 0.27% from other races, and 0.54% from two or more races. 2.69% of the population were Hispanic or Latino of any race.

There were 151 households, out of which 29.8% had children under the age of 18 living with them, 53.6% were married couples living together, 10.6% had a female householder with no husband present, and 27.8% were non-families. 27.2% of all households were made up of individuals, and 13.2% had someone living alone who was 65 years of age or older. The average household size was 2.46 and the average family size was 2.98.

In the city the population was spread out, with 25.5% under the age of 18, 8.6% from 18 to 24, 27.4% from 25 to 44, 23.1% from 45 to 64, and 15.3% who were 65 years of age or older. The median age was 38 years. For every 100 females, there were 87.9 males. For every 100 females age 18 and over, there were 85.9 males.

The median income for a household in the city was $27,813, and the median income for a family was $32,917. Males had a median income of $20,833 versus $25,938 for females. The per capita income for the city was $13,556. About 14.7% of families and 14.6% of the population were below the poverty line, including 23.2% of those under age 18 and 16.4% of those age 65 or over.

== Education ==
Public education for elementary and secondary school students is available from the Palestine–Wheatley School District, which results in graduation from Palestine–Wheatley High School. It was established by the July 1, 1987, merger of the Palestine School District and the Wheatley School District. Therefore, Wheatley High School merged with the nearby Palestine High School.
