= Joseph S. Wheat =

American politician

Member of the Virginia House of Delegates from the Morgan County district
- In office December 4, 1862 – February 5, 1863
- Preceded by: n/a
- Succeeded by: n/a

Member of the West Virginia House of Delegates from the Morgan County district
- Preceded by: n/a

Personal details
- Born: December 20, 1823 Bath, Virginia, U.S.
- Died: May 5, 1872 (aged 69) Berkeley Springs, West Virginia, U.S.
- Spouse: Miranda Grove

Joseph Shaw Wheat (March 31, 1803 – May 5, 1872) was an American farmer, surveyor and civil engineer, who became a politician, serving in the Recalled Session of West Virginia's Constitutional Convention, as well as in the initial and several later sessions of the West Virginia House of Delegates.

== Early and family life ==
Joseph Wheat was born in Berkeley Springs on March 31, 1803, to Englishman and local hotel owner William Wheat and his wife, Virginia-born Elizabeth (Shaw) Wheat. He was educated and became a civil engineer, and Morgan County was created from the area around Berkeley Springs in 1820, as the developers started planning the Chesapeake and Ohio Canal to link the Potomac River watershed (flowing into the Atlantic Ocean) with the Ohio River watershed across the Appalachian Mountains and flowing into the Mississippi River.

He married Miranda Grove, the daughter of a Methodist minister in Frederick County, Virginia, on January 14, 1850. They raised seven children to adulthood: Harriet E. Wheat, Henry C. Wheat, Mary Wheat, James A. Wheat, John F. Wheat and Alfred A. Wheat.

== Career ==
Joseph Wheat was a farmer, and did not own slaves. Although too old to serve as a soldier, his speech on behalf of the Union caused him to be taken as a prisoner to Richmond, Virginia, where he was exchanged after three months and returned home.

Morgan County voters elected him to represent them at the Virginia General Assembly at Wheeling for the session from December 4, 1862 – February 5, 1863 (the first session in which Morgan County had representation).

After West Virginia seceded from the Commonwealth in order to remain in the Union, Joseph Wheat would serve as a delegate to the West Virginia House of Delegates in 1864, 1867 and 1870. Wheat helped establish the state's first free school system (although Thomas Jefferson had advocated such, Virginia did not establish a free school system until after the Civil War, and then grossly underfunded it for decades).

Joseph S. Wheat, a farmer in 1860, would be listed as a surveyor in the 1879 census.

== Later life and death ==
Wheat also served several years as justice of the peace before his death. Joseph S. Wheat died on May 6, 1872.
