= Wheatley School, St. Catharines =

Wheatley School is a co-educational, non-denominational, independent school in St. Catharines, Ontario, Canada.

Wheatley is organized into three divisions: primary (Age 2 to 6), lower elementary (Grades 1–4) and upper elementary (Grades 5–8). Wheatley is an International Baccalaureate (IB) World School with an average student-teacher ratio of 12:1.

Wheatley is governed by an independent Board of Directors. Wheatley school is accredited by the Canadian Council of Montessori Administrators and is a member of the Conference of Independent Schools of Ontario. Eda Varalli is the current Head of School.

== History ==
Founded in 1986 by Principal Eda Varalli with 36 students, Wheatley was incorporated in 1988 and became a non-profit organization. In 1991 the School moved to a larger facility. Between 1996 and 1999, three additional classrooms were added to accommodate increased enrolment.

In 2001, Wheatley moved to a large building on Scott Street, the former Scottlea Public School.

== Academics ==
Wheatley utilizes two proven educational methods: Montessori for children age 2 to grade 4 and the International Baccalaureate Middle Years Programme for Grades 5 to 8.

== Facilities ==
Wheatley's 20,000-square-foot facility consists of classrooms, a library, gymnasium, Mac computer lab and wireless network. The school has a strict safety protocol – the facility is equipped with security cameras and all visitors must report to the office as all entrances are locked during school hours. The 7-acre campus includes a baseball diamond, soccer field, play structure, and a peace garden.
