= Benjamin Altman =

Department store owner and art collector

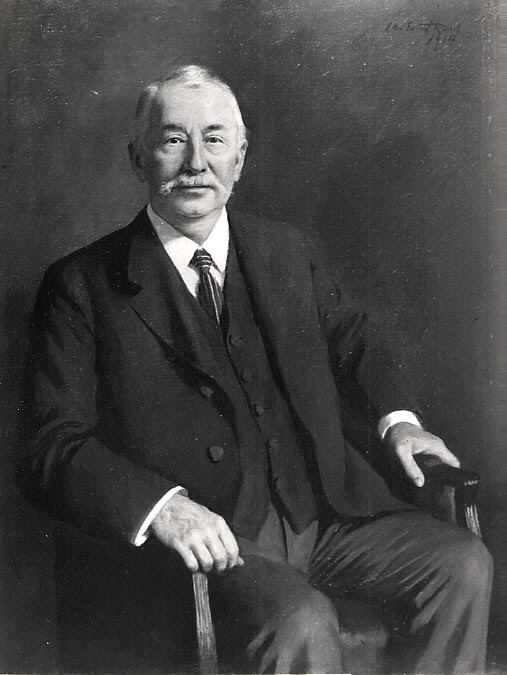
- Altman by Ellen Emmet Rand
- Born: July 12, 1840; New York City, U.S.
- Died: October 7, 1913 (aged 73); New York City, U.S.

Benjamin Altman (July 12, 1840 – October 7, 1913) was a New York City department store owner and art collector who is best known today for his large art collection, which he donated to the Metropolitan Museum of Art.

== Life and career ==
Benjamin Altman was born on July 12, 1840, the son of Bavarian Jews who emigrated to America in 1835 and opened a small store on Attorney Street in New York City. After working in his father's dry goods store, Altman set out on his own. In 1865, Altman founded B. Altman and Company, a dry goods store located on Third Avenue and 10th Street in New York City. Over the years, the store grew in prosperity and expanded to several other locations. In 1877, a large storefront opened on Sixth Avenue; dubbed the "Palace of Trade" for its lavish architecture, Altman's store was one of the first to display clothing for different ages in different areas. In 1906, the B. Altman and Company Building opened on Fifth Avenue.

Altman used his wealth to fund various initiatives in his native city. Shortly before his death on October 7, 1913, he founded the Altman Foundation, a charity to support educational institutions in New York City.

== Art collections and portraits ==
Benjamin Altman was an avid collector of Rembrandt paintings and Oriental porcelain, much of which he acquired through his friend, art dealer Henry J. Duveen. He was often advised in his painting purchases by Max Friedlander. Upon his death, he donated the collection to the Metropolitan Museum of Art. The painting collection alone was notable for including the museum's first Vermeer and 20 Rembrandts, though a few have since been devoted and reattributed. The collection also contains notable portraits of Flemish and German merchants from the Renaissance.

=== Paintings in the bequest of Benjamin Altman, 1913 ===
image	title	painter	date	accession number	The Met url
	Man with a Steel Gorget	Style of Rembrandt	1648	14.40.601	MET
	Yonker Ramp and his sweetheart	Frans Hals	1623	14.40.602	MET
	Old Woman in an Armchair	Jacob Adriaensz Backer	1640	14.40.603	MET
	The Fingernail Test	Frans Hals; Judith Leyster	1626	14.40.604	MET
	Shrovetide Revellers	Frans Hals	1616	14.40.605	MET
	Saint Justina of Padua	Bartolomeo Montagna		14.40.606	MET
	Self-Portrait	Gerrit Dou	1665	14.40.607	MET
	Rembrandt's Son Titus	Style of Rembrandt	1680s	14.40.608	MET
	Old Woman Cutting Her Nails	Style of Rembrandt	1650s	14.40.609	MET
	Pilate Washing His Hands	Style of Rembrandt	1660s	14.40.610	MET
	A Girl Asleep	Johannes Vermeer	1657	14.40.611	MET
	Young Woman Peeling Apples	Nicolaes Maes	1655	14.40.612	MET
	Interior with a Young Couple	Pieter de Hooch	1662	14.40.613	MET
	Entrance to a Village	Meindert Hobbema	1690s	14.40.614	MET
	Portrait of a Woman, Called the Marchesa Durazzo	Anthony van Dyck		14.40.615	MET
	Young Herdsmen with Cows	Aelbert Cuyp		14.40.616	MET
	A Woman Playing the Theorbo-Lute and a Cavalier	Gerard ter Borch		14.40.617	MET
	Self portrait	Rembrandt	1660	14.40.618	MET
	Lucas van Uffel (died 1637)	Anthony van Dyck	1624s	14.40.619	MET
	Portrait of a man with gloves in hand	Rembrandt	1648	14.40.620	MET
	Man with a Magnifying Glass	Rembrandt	1660s	14.40.621	MET
	Woman with a Pink Carnation	Rembrandt	1660s	14.40.622	MET
	Wheat Fields	Jacob van Ruisdael	1670	14.40.623	MET
	Portrait of a Man ("The Auctioneer")	Follower of Rembrandt	1658	14.40.624	MET
	Portrait of a Woman	Rembrandt	1633	14.40.625	MET
	Portrait of Maria Portinari	Hans Memling	1470	14.40.626–27	MET
	The Crucifixion	Fra Angelico		14.40.628	MET
	Young Woman with a Pearl Necklace	after Willem Drost; bequeathed as a Rembrandt in 1913	1654	14.40.629	MET
	Ulrich Fugger (1490–1525)	Hans Maler zu Schwaz	1525	14.40.630	MET
	The Supper at Emmaus	Diego Velázquez		14.40.631	MET
	Virgin and Child with Angels	Bernard van Orley		14.40.632	MET
	Virgin and Child with Saint Anne	Albrecht Dürer	1519	14.40.633	MET
	Mystic Marriage of St. Catherine	Hans Memling	1479	14.40.634	MET
	Madonna and Child with Angels	Workshop of Domenico Ghirlandaio	1500s	14.40.635	MET
	Christ Taking Leave of His Mother	Gerard David		14.40.636	MET
	Lady Lee (Margaret Wyatt, born about 1509)	Workshop of Hans Holbein the Younger	1540s	14.40.637	MET
	Federigo Gonzaga (1500–1540)	Francesco Francia	1510	14.40.638	MET
	Philip IV (1605–1665), King of Spain	Diego Velázquez		14.40.639	MET
	Portrait of a Man	Titian	1512	14.40.640	MET
	Madonna and Child with Saint Joseph and an Angel	Raffaellino del Garbo		14.40.641	MET
	The Last Communion of Saint Jerome	Sandro Botticelli	1495	14.40.642	MET
	The Holy Family with Saint Mary Magdalen	Andrea Mantegna	1495	14.40.643	MET
	Portrait of a Man	Dieric Bouts	1470	14.40.644	MET
	Portrait of a Young Man	Antonello da Messina		14.40.645	MET
	Lady Rich (Elizabeth Jenks, died 1558)	Workshop of Hans Holbein the Younger	1540	14.40.646	MET
	Madonna and Child	Workshop of Andrea del Verrocchio	1470	14.40.647	MET
	Portrait of an old man	Hans Memling	1475	14.40.648	MET
	Portrait of a Young Man	Cosimo Tura		14.40.649	MET
	Portrait of Cardinal Filippo Archinto	Titian		14.40.650	MET
	Bathsheba at her Toilette	Rembrandt	1643	14.40.651	MET
	Changing Pasture	Anton Mauve		14.40.810	MET
	The Ferryman	Jean-Baptiste Camille Corot	1865s	14.40.811	MET
	Twilight	Anton Mauve		14.40.812	MET
	A Pond in Picardy	Jean-Baptiste Camille Corot		14.40.813	MET
	A Path among the Rocks	Théodore Rousseau		14.40.814	MET
	The Banks of the Oise	Charles-François Daubigny	1863	14.40.815	MET
	The Return to the Fold	Anton Mauve		14.40.816	MET
	A Lane through the Trees	Jean-Baptiste Camille Corot		14.40.817	MET
	A River Landscape with Storks	Charles-François Daubigny	1864	14.40.818	MET
	The Edge of the Woods	Narcisse Virgilio Díaz	1872	14.40.819	MET

There is a portrait of Altman in the New York State Museum in Albany; it was painted by the Swiss-born American artist Adolfo Müller-Ury (1862–1947) and donated to the New York Chamber of Commerce by Altman's business partner Michael Friedsam. Müller-Ury knew Altman personally as a client of art dealer Henry Duveen. He was compelled to paint from a photograph after Altman's death. He first completed a 50 x 40 (inch) portrait of Altman seated in his gallery with a Rembrandt behind him and a Chinese vase on a table beside him, but the Metropolitan Museum of Art, for whom this had been painted, chose another portrait of Altman by Ellen Emmet Rand also made from a photograph, and Müller-Ury's larger work went to the Foundation offices; it has since disappeared.
