= Whatley (surname) =

Whatley is a surname. Notable people with the name include:

- Anne Whatley (1561–1600), said to have been William Shakespeare's fiancée (also spelled Whateley and Whately)
- Bill Whatley (footballer) (1912–1974), Welsh footballer
- Booker T. Whatley (1915–2005), American agricultural expert and professor
- Christopher Whatley, Scottish historian
- Dave Whatley(1927–2015), American street performer and local celebrity, better known as Dancin' Dave
- David Whatley (born 1966), American business executive
- Dixie Whatley, American television personality
- Ebenezer Whatley (1878–1933), English-born farmer and Canadian political figure
- Ennis Whatley (born 1962), American basketball player
- Fez Whatley (born 1964), American comedian and radio host
- Frederick Whatley (1924–2020), English botanist, biochemist, and professor
- George Whatley (died 1791), English lawyer and friend and correspondent of Benjamin Franklin
- Guy Whatley (born 1975), American organist and harpsichordist
- Jesse Whatley (1895–1982), English footballer
- Joshua Whatley (born 2005), British motorcyclist
- Mark Whatley (born 1990), Scottish footballer
- Matt Whatley (baseball) (born 1996), American baseball catcher
- Matt Whatley (footballer) (born 1992), Welsh footballer
- Michael Whatley (born 1968 or 1969), Republican National Committee chair
- Mickey Whatley (1935–2011), American politician from South Carolina
- Norman Whatley (1884–1965), English educationalist and historian
- Pez Whatley (1951–2005), American professional wrestler
- Stephen B. Whatley (born 1965), English painter
- Steve Whatley (1959–2005), British actor, consumer expert, journalist, and television presenter
- Thomas Whatley (born 1953), American sprinter
- Tom Whatley (born 1970), American politician from Alabama
- William Whatley (born 2001), American scholar, Information Technology Specialist, and devout Catholic

== Fictional people ==
- Tim Whatley, a dentist on the sitcom Seinfeld

== See also ==
- Whately (disambiguation)
- Wheatley (disambiguation)
- List of Old English (Anglo-Saxon) surnames
