= Wheat Fields (Ruisdael) =

Painting by Jacob van Ruisdael

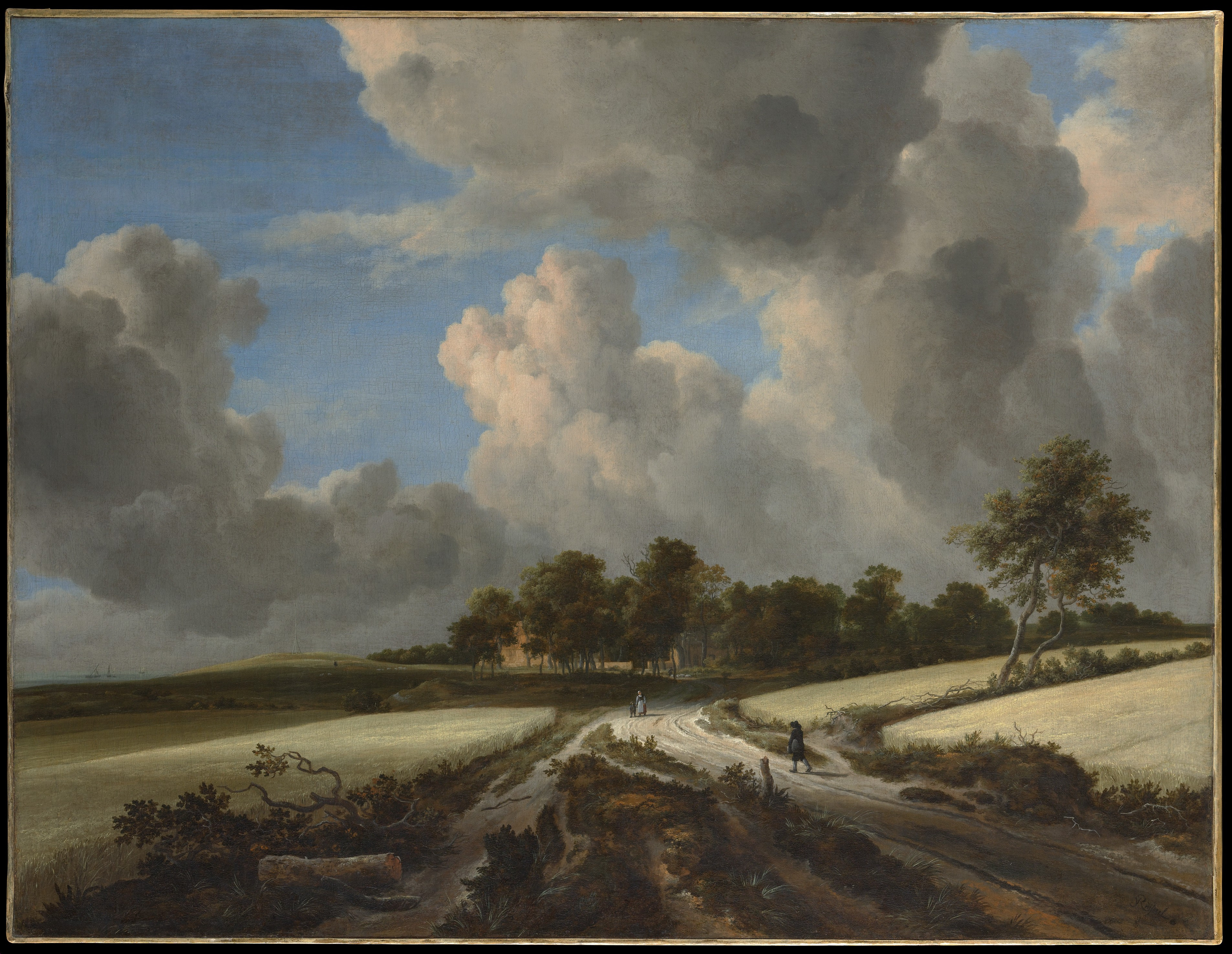
- Artist: Jacob van Ruisdael
- Year: c. 1670
- Medium: Oil on canvas
- Dimensions: 100 cm × 130.2 cm (39 in × 51.3 in)
- Location: Metropolitan Museum of Art; New York

Wheat Fields is a late 17th-century oil painting by Jacob van Ruisdael. The painting depicts a wheat field in the Netherlands.

== Description ==
Wheat Fields is a Dutch landscape painting created by Jacob van Ruisdael. The painting is one of twenty-seven works that Ruisdael produced concerning fields of grain. Ruisdael's work depicts a road passing between two fields of wheat. Beyond the fields, a small woods and a house can be seen. In the far left corner of the painting, the coastline and several ships at sea can be made out. Towering clouds drift in the sky above the scene, and several people can be seen coming and going along the road. In addition to familiar pastoral themes, Ruisdael included intricate depictions of various forms of flora. Attention was not only lavished on the uniform blocks of wheat, but also on the verdant tendrils of grass and weeds that has encroached upon the roadway. Trees, both alive and fallen, are also pictured.

At 100 cm by 130 cm, the painting is rather large. It was intended to hang in a high place, such as above a fireplace mantel. This painting came into the collection via the bequest of Benjamin Altman in 1914. It was selected by the New York art historian Thomas Craven as one of Ruisdael's best landscape compositions.

== See also ==
- List of paintings by Jacob van Ruisdael
