= Wheatley Hills (disambiguation) =

Wheatley Hills is a suburb of Doncaster, England.

Wheatley Hills may also refer to

- Wheatley Hills, New York, United States
- Wheatley Hills Golf Club, New York, United States

== See also ==
- Wheatley Hill, a village in County Durham, England
