= Paul Wheatley =

Paul Wheatley may refer to:

- Paul Wheatley (footballer) (born 1981), former Australian rules footballer
- Paul Wheatley (geographer) (1921–1999), historical geographer
- Paul Wheatley (priest) (born 1938), Archdeacon of Sherborne
- Crane Technique (Paul John Wheatley, born 1979), Irish-American musician
