= John Wheatley (disambiguation) =

John Wheatley (1869–1930) was a Scottish politician.

John Wheatley may also refer to:

- John Wheatley (cricketer) (1860–1962), cricketer from New Zealand
- John Laviers Wheatley (1892–1955), Welsh painter and printmaker
- John Wheatley, Baron Wheatley (1908–1988), Scottish politician
- John Wheatley, Lord Wheatley (born 1941), Scottish lawyer and judge
- John Wheatley (physicist) (1927–1986), American experimental physicist
