= Joan Wheatley =

American mezzo-soprano singer (1918–2005)

Joan Withington Wheatley (September 29, 1918 – July 20, 2005) was an American mezzo-soprano singer who performed in personal appearances, on radio, and on Broadway.

== Early life and education ==
Born in Artesia, New Mexico, on September 29, 1918, Wheatley was the daughter of Rex Wheatley and Florence E. Wheatley (née Withington). She first studied piano when she was five years old. She gave piano recitals while she was a high school student, and she played flute in the Pecos Valley Junior High School orchestra and in the New Mexico Junior High and High School Orchestra.

At Occidental College Wheatley studied flute, piano, and voice, was president of her sophomore class, and was a member of Phi Beta Kappa. She began graduate study at Columbia University with plans to be a missionary in India. However, when she reunited with a college friend who was a member of Fred Waring's glee club, musical interests became her primary focus. A successful audition with Waring combined with the sickness of a glee club member to give her an opportunity to become a soloist for Waring. She also went on to earn a master's degree in sociology from Columbia. In 1942, Wheatley received a scholarship funded by Mary Martin through Paramount Studios. Wheatley was selected from 50 young women who auditioned out of 250 initial applicants.

== Career ==
In May 1940, Wheatley was singing on a weekly variety program on WNYC radio in New York City. She also sang on the RCA Victor Show and on An Invitation to Music, a symphony program on CBS.

Wheatley sang with the Collegiate Chorale and the Light Opera Repertory Company of New York. In 1942, she appeared in a revival of The New Moon at Carnegie Hall. On Broadway, she performed in The Merry Widow (1942) and Rosalinda (1942).

After Fred Waring heard Wheatley sing in 1945, she became a featured soloist with his Pennsylvanians musical group. Her first solo performance on Waring's radio program came on March 22, 1945, and she went on to sing solos regularly on his broadcasts on radio and television.

During World War II, Wheatley sang for wounded military personnel in hospitals. In 1946, she decided to combine her college training with her musical abilities to study the then-new field of musical therapy, both as a performer and as a developer of new techniques in that field. She said that she would be able to work in that area while continuing to sing with Waring.

In July 1953, Wheatley began singing nightly in the Pagoda Room of the Saxony Hotel in Miami.

== Death ==
Wheatley died on July 20, 2005, at the age of 86.
