= Palestine, Arkansas =

- Town
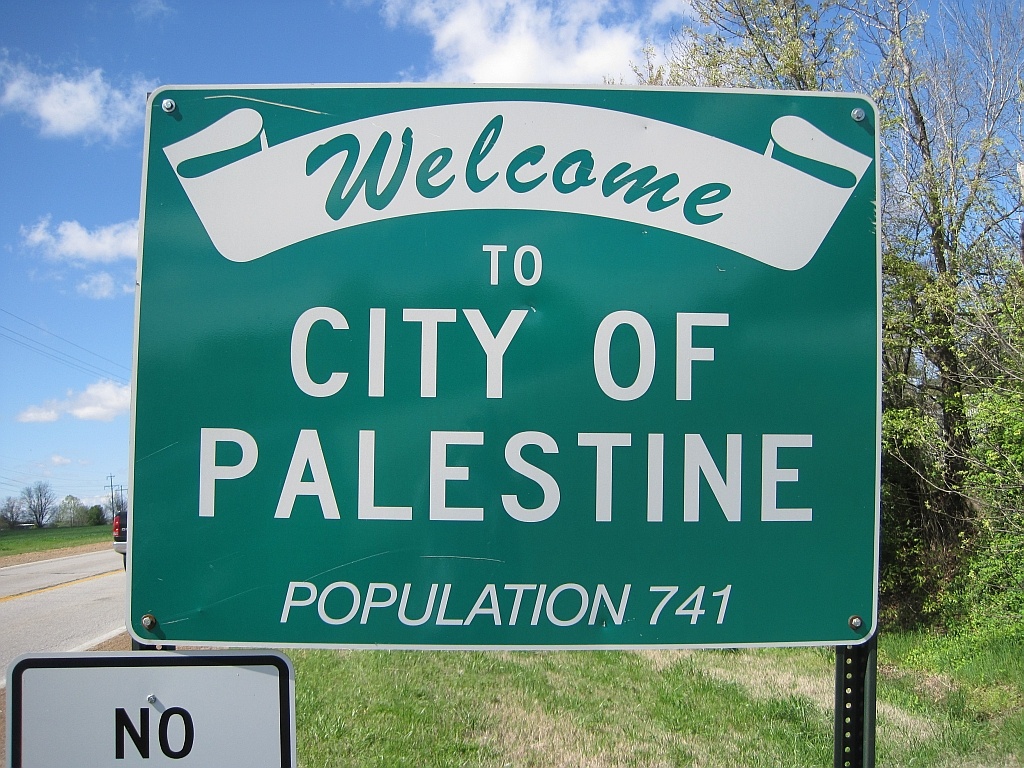

- Location of Palestine in St. Francis County, Arkansas.
- Coordinates: 34°58′11″N 90°54′25″W
- Country: United States
- State: Arkansas
- County: St. Francis

Area
  - Total: 3.33 sq mi (8.62 km^{2})
  - Land: 3.31 sq mi (8.56 km^{2})
  - Water: 0.023 sq mi (0.06 km^{2})
- Elevation: 213 ft (65 m)

Population (2020)
  - Total: 506
  - Estimate (2025): 476 ▼
  - Density: 153.1/sq mi (59.11/km^{2})
- Time zone: UTC-6 (Central (CST))
  - Summer (DST): UTC-5 (CDT)
- FIPS code: 05-53150
- GNIS feature ID: 2404462

Palestine is a town in St. Francis County, Arkansas, United States, along the L'Anguille River. The population was 506 at the 2020 census, a decline from 681 in 2010.

== Geography ==
According to the United States Census Bureau, the town has a total area of 3.2 square miles (8.3 km^{2}), of which 3.2 square miles (8.3 km^{2}) is land and 0.04 square miles (0.10 km^{2}) (0.62%) is water.

== Demographics ==
Historical population
Census	Pop.	Note	%±
1890	163		—
1900	196		20.2%
1910	173		−11.7%
1920	297		71.7%
1930	209		−29.6%
1940	345		65.1%
1950	420		21.7%
1960	532		26.7%
1970	755		41.9%
1980	976		29.3%
1990	711		−27.2%
2000	741		4.2%
2010	681		−8.1%
2020	506		−25.7%
2025 (est.)	476	▼	−5.9%
U.S. Decennial Census

As of the census of 2000, there were 741 people, 299 households, and 209 families residing in the town. The population density was 230.2 inhabitants per square mile (88.9/km^{2}). There were 321 housing units at an average density of 99.7 per square mile (38.5/km^{2}). The racial makeup of the city was 85.96% White, 13.23% Black or African American, 0.13% from other races, and 0.67% from two or more races. 0.27% of the population were Hispanic or Latino of any race.

There were 299 households, out of which 33.4% had children under the age of 18 living with them, 52.2% were married couples living together, 15.1% had a female householder with no husband present, and 30.1% were non-families. 27.1% of all households were made up of individuals, and 15.4% had someone living alone who was 65 years of age or older. The average household size was 2.48 and the average family size was 3.01.

In the town, the population was spread out as follows: 26.7% of the population were under the age of 18, 9.6% from 18 to 24, 26.2% from 25 to 44, 23.3% from 45 to 64, and 14.2% who were 65 years of age or older. The median age was 36 years. For every 100 females, there were 81.6 males. For every 100 females age 18 and over, there were 81.0 males.

The median income for a household in the town was $24,904, and the median income for a family was $36,023. Males had a median income of $28,661 versus $18,816 for females. The per capita income for the town was $14,462. About 16.7% of families and 17.2% of the population were below the poverty line, including 17.5% of those under age 18 and 19.0% of those age 65 or over.

== Education ==
Public education for elementary and secondary school students is available from the Palestine–Wheatley School District, which results in graduation from Palestine–Wheatley High School. It was established by the July 1, 1987 merger of the Palestine School District and the Wheatley School District.
