= Whatley =

Whatley may refer to:

== Places ==
- Whatley, Alabama, a place in the United States
- Whatley, Mendip, in the district of Mendip, Somerset, England
- Whatley, South Somerset, in the district of South Somerset, Somerset, England

== People ==
- Whatley (surname), people with the surname

== See also ==
- Whatley Manor, hotel and restaurant in Wiltshire, England
- Whately (disambiguation)
