= Whately =

Whately may refer to:

== Places ==
- Whately, Massachusetts, a US town

== People with the surname ==
- Whately (surname)

== See also ==
- Whatley (disambiguation)
- Whateley (disambiguation)
- Wheatley (disambiguation)
