= Lloyd F. Wheat =

American politician (1923–2004)

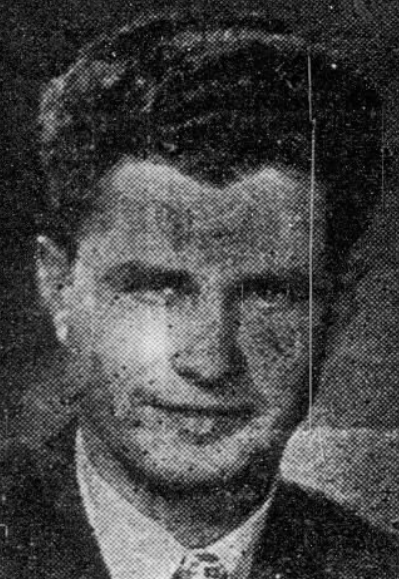
- Wheat in 1948

Member of the Louisiana State Senate
- In office 1948–1952
- Preceded by: A. A. Fredericks
- Succeeded by: Sylvan Friedman

Personal details
- Born: Lloyd Franklin Wheat; April 27, 1923 Metairie, Louisiana, U.S.
- Died: April 27, 2004 (aged 81) Metairie, Louisiana, U.S.
- Party: Democratic
- Education: Louisiana State University Law School

Lloyd Franklin Wheat (April 27, 1923 – April 27, 2004) was an American politician. A member of the Democratic Party, he served in the Louisiana State Senate from 1948 to 1952.

== Life and career ==
Wheat was born in Metairie, Louisiana, the son of William and Ada Wheat. He served in the United States Army during World War II, which after his discharge, he attended and graduated from Louisiana State University Law School. After graduating, he worked as a lawyer.

Wheat served in the Louisiana State Senate from 1948 to 1952.

== Death ==
Wheat died on April 27, 2004, in Metairie, Louisiana, at the age of 81.
