= Arthur Wheat (cricketer) =

English cricketer

Arthur Bradley Wheat (13 May 1898 – 20 May 1973) was an English first-class cricketer active 1924–39 who played for Nottinghamshire (awarded county cap in 1931). He was born in Halam; died in Kirkby-in-Ashfield.
