= Palestine–Wheatley High School =

Location
- 7900 US 70 West; Palestine, Arkansas 72372; United States; 34°58′8″N 90°54′14″W

Information
- School type: Comprehensive
- School district: Palestine–Wheatley School District
- NCES District ID: 0500051
- CEEB code: 041935
- NCES School ID: 050005100833
- Teaching staff: 82.26 (on FTE basis)
- Grades: 7–12
- Enrollment: 356 (2023–2024)
- Student to teacher ratio: 4.33
- Colors: Red, white, blue
- Athletics conference: 3A Region 6 (2012–14)
- Mascot: Patriot
- Team name: Palestine–Wheatley Patriots
- Website: www.pwsd.k12.ar.us/o/seniorhigh

Palestine–Wheatley High School is a comprehensive six-year public high school in Palestine, Arkansas, United States. It is one of four public high schools located in St. Francis County and is the sole high school administered by Palestine–Wheatley School District serving approximately 400 students in grades 9 through 12.

In the late 1980s, the Palestine School District and its Palestine High School (Red Devils) merged with the Wheatley High School (Pirates) to form the Palestine–Wheatley High School at the former Palestine High School; the original Wheatley High School was demolished. The original Palestine High School (and subsequently the first Palestine–Wheatley High School) and gymnasium were demolished in the 1980s and replaced with the current facility in Palestine.

== Academics ==
The assumed course of study follows the Smart Core curriculum developed by the Arkansas Department of Education (ADE), which requires students to complete at least 22 units prior to graduation. Students complete regular (core and career focus) classes and exams and may select Advanced Placement (AP) coursework and exams that may result in college credit. Guy–Perkins High School is accredited by the ADE.

Jonathan Crossley, an English language arts teacher at Palestine Wheatley High School, was named the 2014 Arkansas Teacher of the Year at a surprise notification in Palestine November 19, 2013.

== Extracurricular activities ==
The Palestine–Wheatley mascot and athletic emblem is the Patriot with red, white and blue serving as its school colors. Previously, the Palestine High School mascot was the Red Devil with the Pirate serving as the Wheatley High School mascot. Mascot picked by Donna Henard as a settlement in a federal lawsuit.

=== Athletics ===
The Palestine–Wheatley Patriots compete in the state's second smallest classification—2A Classification administered by the Arkansas Activities Association. For 2012–14, Patriots compete in the 2A Region 6 Conference providing teams in football, basketball (boys/girls), baseball, softball, debate, cheer, and track and field (boys/girls).

- Basketball: The Palestine–Wheatley girls basketball team won a state 2A basketball championship in 2001. Prior to the merger with Wheatley High School in the mid-1980s, the Palestine girls team won three state championships in 1980, 1982 and 1983.
