= List of school districts in Arkansas =

This is the list of school districts in Arkansas.

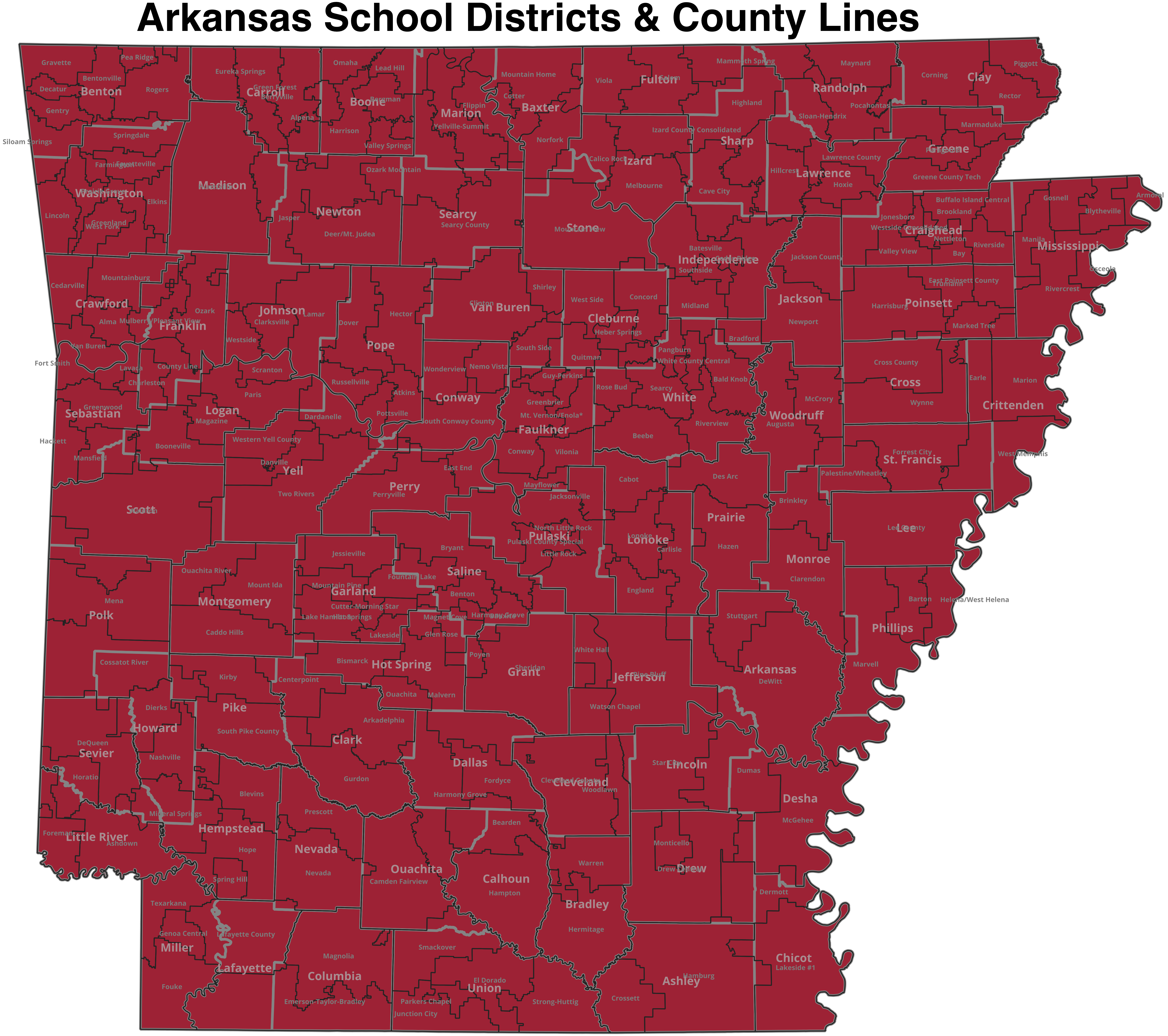
Arkansas School Districts

All of Arkansas's school districts are of one type, and Arkansas has no dependent school systems (that is, school systems dependent on a city or county government). All Arkansas school districts are independent governments.

== Background ==
A proposed school consolidation came as a result of education reform measures spearheaded by the Arkansas Education Association (AEA), which was prompted by a 1921 study done by the Arkansas Legislature that criticized conditions at various public schools.

In the 1926–1927 school year, Arkansas had 4,711 school districts, with 3,106 of them each operating a school for white students that only employed a single teacher. Various laws affecting taxation and state and county governance reduced the number of school districts, including a 1927 law that allowed counties, upon voter approval, to modify boundaries of existing school districts or to create new school districts, Act 156, and a 1929 law that allowed voters in a county to vote in favor of consolidating multiple school districts into one, Act 149. However, in 1931 a law was passed stating that in order for a school district to consolidate, the voters in each district must approve.

In the 1932–1933 school year, Arkansas had 3,086 school districts, with 1,990 of them each operating a school for white students that only employed a single teacher. Calvin R. Ledbetter Jr. of the University of Arkansas at Little Rock stated that the Great Depression caused a drop in government revenues and frustrated school consolidation.

In 1946 there were 1,900 school districts educating 406,199 students, with a typical county having an average of 25 school districts. That year 76,000 students lived in a district which had a high school that had not been accredited since there were insufficient students, and about 100,000 students lived in districts that did not operate high schools. Ledbetter stated that about 40% of the K-12 students in Arkansas were realistically not able to go beyond junior high school. That year there was a petition for an Act 1 which would have forced school districts with under 350 students to form "county rural school districts", created as a result of a lack of teachers due to several being drafted into the military, moving out of state, or moving on to defense jobs during World War II. This proposal would mean Arkansas would have about 400 school districts. The two newspapers distributed throughout the entire state of Arkansas supported this. However newspapers did not print advertisements supporting the passage of the act nor did they print the opposite. At the time people advocating for or against political causes bought space to print advertisements for them in newspapers. Voters rejected this with 68,510 opposing (50.47%), with the Arkansas Democrat stating that they were heavily in smaller counties and especially in the state's north, and with 67,209 (49.52%) supporting, credited by the Democrat as being heavily in larger counties. Ledbetter characterized the voting margin as "a fraction".

In 1948 over 60% of Arkansas voters passed Act 1, which was to force any school district with under 300 students to consolidate. No lawsuits resulted from the passage. There were no advertisements supporting the referendum in newspapers, nor any against. Governor of Arkansas Benjamin Travis Laney stated opposition without stating his reasoning. It was favored by Sid McMath, who became the Democratic Party candidate for governor. The two major statewide newspapers also supported this act. Some rural voters were afraid their children would have too long of a commute to school and therefore opposed it.

From 1948 to 1949, the number of school districts fell from 1,600 to 423, and in 1964 this was down to 412. In 1966 there was a referendum to require school districts with under 400 students to consolidate. The Arkansas Gazette supported the measure but Governor of Arkansas Orval Faubus stated opposition to it. Additionally Winthrop Rockefeller and Jim Johnson, two candidates for the 1966 election of the governor of Arkansas, also stated opposition. 321,733 people voted against it, making up 73.59%. 115,452 people voted for it, making up 26.41%. Ledbetter characterized the result as "a landslide".

There were 370 school districts in 1983. After the Arkansas State Board of Education created rules for the minimum level of standards a school district must provide in its educational program that year, the number of school districts declined further, with there being 311 in 1996, and then, as of 1998, 310.

Since 2003, two major components in Arkansas public school districts must exist:

- Each school district must have a high school, and
- Each school district must have at least 350 students.

The current consolidation policy that mandates operational changes for all districts with fewer than 350 students is the Public Education Reorganization Act—Act 60 of the Second Extraordinary Session of 2003.

Geographical school districts in Arkansas are generally independent from city or county jurisdiction.

Arkansas school district boundaries are not always aligned with county or city boundaries; a district can occupy several counties and cities, while a single city (especially larger ones such as Little Rock, Fort Smith, or Jonesboro) may be split between several districts. Almost all Arkansas school districts use the title "School District", or "Public Schools."

All districts come under the jurisdiction of the Arkansas Department of Education (ADE).

In 1996 the average Arkansas school district had 1,468 students.

== Arch Ford Educational Service ==
=== Cleburne County ===
- Heber Springs School District
- Quitman School District
- West Side School District

=== Conway County ===
- Nemo Vista School District
- South Conway County School District
- Wonderview School District

=== Faulkner County ===
- Conway School District
- Greenbrier School District
- Guy–Perkins School District
- Mayflower School District
- Mount Vernon–Enola School District
- Vilonia School District

=== Perry County ===
- East End School District
- Perryville School District

=== Pope County ===
- Atkins School District
- Dover School District
- Hector School District
- Pottsville School District
- Russellville School District

=== Van Buren County ===
- Clinton School District
- Shirley School District
- South Side School District

=== Yell County ===
- Danville School District
- Dardanelle Public Schools
- Two Rivers School District
- Western Yell County School District

== Arkansas River Educational Service Center ==
=== Arkansas County ===
- Stuttgart Public Schools

=== Grant County ===
- Sheridan School District

=== Jefferson County ===
- Pine Bluff School District
- Watson Chapel School District
- White Hall School District

== Crowley's Ridge Education Co-op ==
=== Craighead County ===
- Bay School District
- Brookland School District
- Buffalo Island Central School District
- Jonesboro School District
- Nettleton School District
- Riverside School District
- Valley View School District

=== Crittenden County ===
- Earle School District
- Marion School District

=== Cross County ===
- Cross County School District
- Wynne School District

=== Jackson County ===
- Newport School District

=== Mississippi County ===
- Armorel School District
- Blytheville School District
- Gosnell School District
- Manila School District
- Osceola School District
- Rivercrest School District

=== Poinsett County ===
- East Poinsett County School District
- Harrisburg School District
- Marked Tree School District
- Trumann Public Schools

== Dawson Education Service Co-op ==
=== Clark County ===
- Arkadelphia School District
- Gurdon School District

=== Garland County ===
- Cutter–Morning Star School District
- Fountain Lake School District
- Hot Springs School District
- Jessieville School District
- Lake Hamilton School District
- Lakeside School District
- Mountain Pine School District

=== Grant County ===
- Poyen School District

=== Hot Spring County ===
- Bismarck School District
- Glen Rose School District
- Magnet Cove School District
- Malvern School District
- Ouachita School District

=== Pike County ===
- Centerpoint School District
- Kirby School District
- South Pike County School District

=== Saline County ===
- Bauxite School District
- Benton School District
- Bryant School District
- Harmony Grove School District

== DeQueen/Mena Education Co-op ==
=== Howard County ===
- Dierks School District
- Mineral Springs Saratoga School District
- Nashville School District

=== Little River County ===
- Ashdown School District
- Foreman School District

=== Montgomery County ===
- Caddo Hills School District
- Mount Ida School District

=== Polk County ===
- Cossatot River School District
- Mena School District
- Ouachita River School District

=== Sevier County ===
- DeQueen School District
- Horatio School District

== Great Rivers Education Service Co-op ==
=== Crittenden County ===
- West Memphis School District

=== Lee County ===
- Lee County School District

=== Monroe County ===
- Brinkley School District
- Clarendon School District

=== Phillips County ===
- Barton–Lexa School District
- Helena-West Helena School District
- KIPP: Delta Public Schools
- Marvell–Elaine School District

=== St. Francis County ===
- Forrest City School District
- Palestine–Wheatley School District

== Guy Fenter Education Service Cooperative ==
=== Crawford County ===
- Alma School District
- Cedarville School District
- Mountainburg School District
- Mulberry–Pleasant View Bi-County School District
- Van Buren School District

=== Franklin County ===
- Charleston School District
- County Line School District
- Ozark School District

=== Johnson County ===
- Clarksville School District
- Lamar School District
- Westside School District

=== Logan County ===
- Booneville School District
- Magazine School District
- Paris School District
- Scranton School District

=== Scott County ===
- Waldron School District

=== Sebastian County ===
- Fort Smith School District
- Greenwood School District
- Hackett School District
- Lavaca School District
- Mansfield School District

== North Central Arkansas Education Co-op ==
=== Baxter County ===
- Mountain Home School District
- Norfork School District

=== Cleburne County ===
- Concord School District

=== Fulton County ===
- Mammoth Spring School District
- Salem School District
- Viola School District

=== Independence County ===
- Batesville School District
- Cedar Ridge School District
- Midland School District
- Southside School District

=== Izard County ===
- Calico Rock School District
- Izard County Consolidated School District
- Melbourne School District

=== Sharp County ===
- Cave City School District
- Highland School District

=== Stone County ===
- Mountain View School District

== Northeast Arkansas Education Co-op ==
=== Clay County ===
- Corning School District
- Piggott School District
- Rector School District

=== Craighead County ===
- Westside Consolidated School District

=== Greene County ===
- Greene County Tech School District
- Marmaduke School District
- Paragould School District

=== Jackson County ===
- Jackson County School District

=== Lawrence County ===
- Hillcrest School District
- Hoxie School District
- Imboden Charter School District
- Lawrence County School District
- Sloan–Hendrix School District

=== Randolph County ===
- Maynard School District
- Pocahontas School District

== Northwest Arkansas Education Co-op ==
=== Benton County ===
- Bentonville School District
- Decatur Public Schools
- Gentry School District
- Gravette School District
- Pea Ridge School District
- Rogers School District
- Siloam Springs School District

=== Madison County ===
- Huntsville School District

=== Washington County ===
- Elkins School District
- Farmington School District
- Fayetteville School District
- Greenland School District
- Lincoln School District
- Prairie Grove School District
- Springdale School District
- West Fork School District

== Ozark Unlimited Resource Co-op ==
=== Baxter County ===
- Cotter School District

=== Boone County ===
- Alpena School District
- Bergman School District
- Harrison School District
- Lead Hill School District
- Omaha School District
- Valley Springs School District

=== Carroll County ===
- Berryville School District
- Eureka Springs School District
- Green Forest School District

=== Marion County ===
- Flippin School District
- Yellville–Summit School District

=== Newton County ===
- Deer/Mount Judea School District
- Jasper School District

=== Searcy County ===
- Ozark Mountain School District
- Searcy County School District

== Pulaski County Schools ==
=== Pulaski County ===
- Jacksonville North Pulaski School District
- Little Rock School District
- North Little Rock School District
- Pulaski County Special School District

== South Central Service Co-op ==
=== Calhoun County ===
- Hampton School District

=== Columbia County ===
- Emerson-Taylor-Bradley School District
- Magnolia School District

=== Ouachita County ===
- Bearden School District
- Camden Fairview School District
- Harmony Grove School District

=== Union County ===
- El Dorado School District
- Junction City School District
- Parkers Chapel School District
- Smackover School District
- Strong–Huttig School District

== Southeast Arkansas Educational ==
=== Arkansas County ===
- Dewitt School District

=== Ashley County ===
- Crossett School District
- Hamburg School District

=== Bradley County ===
- Hermitage School District
- Warren School District

=== Chicot County ===
- Dermott School District
- Lakeside School District

=== Cleveland County ===
- Cleveland County School District
- Woodlawn School District

=== Dallas County ===
- Fordyce School District

=== Desha County ===
- Dumas School District
- McGehee School District

=== Drew County ===
- Drew Central School District
- Monticello School District

=== Lincoln County ===
- Star City School District

== Southwest Arkansas Co-op ==
=== Hempstead County ===
- Blevins School District
- Hope School District
- Spring Hill School District

=== Lafayette County ===
- Lafayette County School District

=== Miller County ===
- Fouke School District
- Genoa Central School District
- Texarkana Arkansas Schools

=== Nevada County ===
- Nevada School District
- Prescott School District

== Wilbur D. Mills Education Co-op ==
=== Lonoke County ===
- Cabot School District
- Carlisle School District
- England School District
- Lonoke School District

=== Prairie County ===
- Des Arc School District
- Hazen School District

=== White County ===
- Bald Knob School District
- Beebe School District
- Bradford School District
- Pangburn School District
- Riverview School District
- Rose Bud School District
- Searcy School District
- White County Central School District

=== Woodruff County ===
- Augusta School District
- McCrory School District

== See also ==
- List of high schools in Arkansas
