= Williford, Arkansas =

Town in Arkansas, United States

- Town
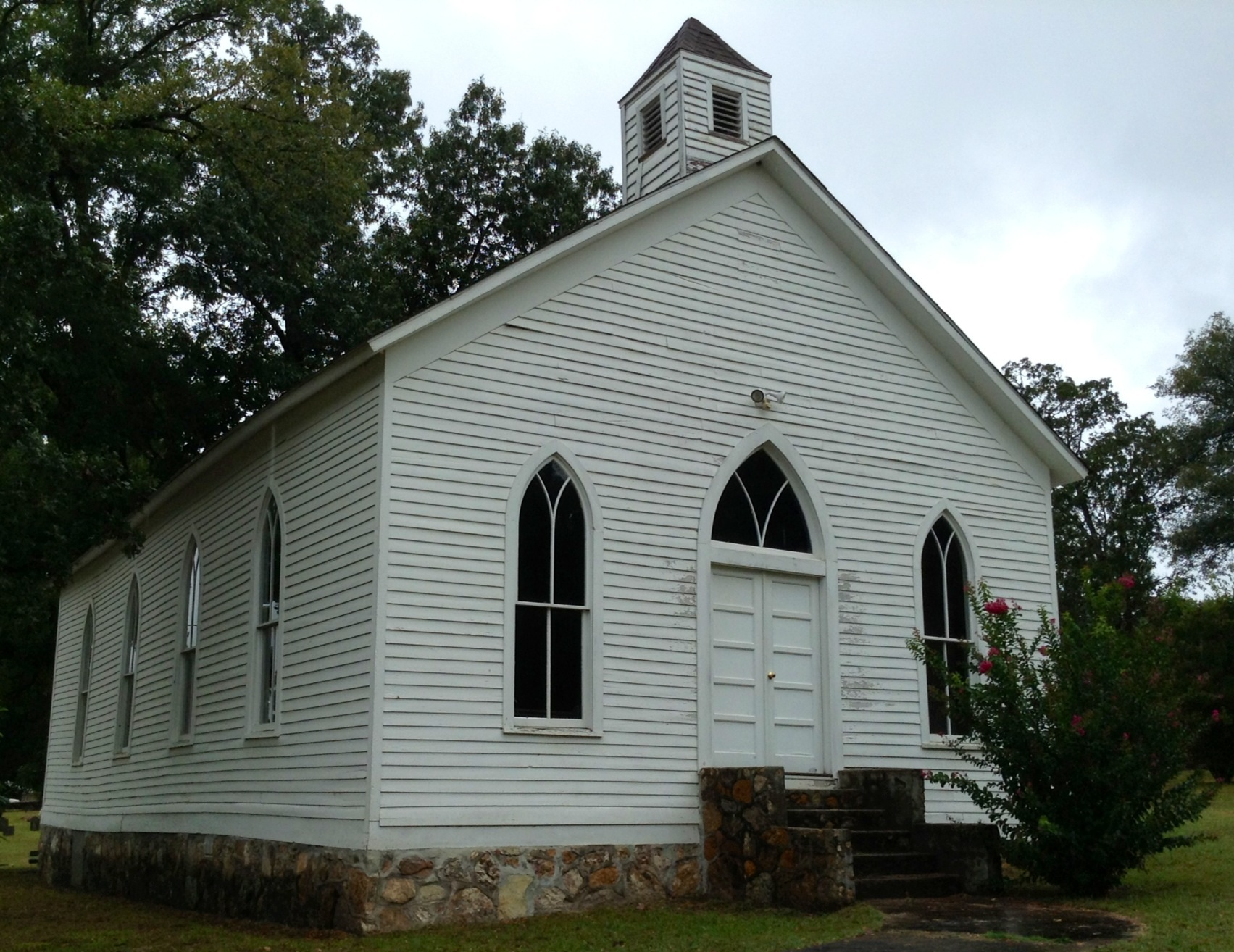
- Williford Methodist Church, listed on the National Register of Historic Places

- Location of Williford in Sharp County, Arkansas.
- Coordinates: 36°15′6″N 91°21′33″W
- Country: United States
- State: Arkansas
- County: Sharp

Government
  - Mayor: Linda Brock

Area
  - Total: 0.35 sq mi (0.91 km^{2})
  - Land: 0.35 sq mi (0.91 km^{2})
  - Water: 0 sq mi (0.00 km^{2})
- Elevation: 331 ft (101 m)

Population (2020)
  - Total: 79
  - Estimate (2025): 85 ▲
  - Density: 226.1/sq mi (87.29/km^{2})
- Time zone: UTC-6 (Central (CST))
  - Summer (DST): UTC-5 (CDT)
- ZIP code: 72482
- Area code: 870
- FIPS code: 05-75740
- GNIS feature ID: 2406890

Williford is a town in Sharp County, Arkansas, United States. The population was 70 in 2020

== Geography ==
Williford is located at 36°15′6″N 91°21′33″W (36.251586, -91.359232).

According to the United States Census Bureau, the town has a total area of 0.9 km^{2} (0.3 mi^{2}), all land.

== Climate ==
The warmest summers that Williford has witnessed occurred in 1998, 2003, 2005, 2006, 2007, 2009, 2010, 2012, 2013, 2014, 2015 and 2016.

== Demographics ==
Historical population
| Census | Pop. | Note | %± |
|---|---|---|---|
| 1920 | 357 | | — |
| 1930 | 279 | | −21.8% |
| 1940 | 272 | | −2.5% |
| 1950 | 213 | | −21.7% |
| 1960 | 195 | | −8.5% |
| 1970 | 175 | | −10.3% |
| 1980 | 169 | | −3.4% |
| 1990 | 69 | | −59.2% |
| 2000 | 63 | | −8.7% |
| 2010 | 75 | | 19.0% |
| 2020 | 79 | | 5.3% |
| 2025 (est.) | 85 | ▲ | 7.6% |
U.S. Decennial Census

As of the census of 2000, there were 63 people, 32 households, and 18 families residing in the town. The population density was 71.5/km^{2} (187.3/mi^{2}). There were 46 housing units at an average density of 52.2/km^{2} (136.8/mi^{2}). The racial makeup of the town was 96.83% White, and 3.17% from two or more races.

There were 32 households, out of which 25.0% had children under the age of 18 living with them, 43.8% were married couples living together, 6.3% had a female householder with no husband present, and 43.8% were non-families. 40.6% of all households were made up of individuals, and 18.8% had someone living alone who was 65 years of age or older. The average household size was 1.97 and the average family size was 2.61.

In the town, the population was spread out, with 19.0% under the age of 18, 9.5% from 18 to 24, 27.0% from 25 to 44, 27.0% from 45 to 64, and 17.5% who were 65 years of age or older. The median age was 42 years. For every 100 females, there were 110.0 males. For every 100 females age 18 and over, there were 112.5 males.

The median income for a household in the town was $11,875, and the median income for a family was $20,000. Males had a median income of $11,250 versus $11,250 for females. The per capita income for the town was $27,942. There were 30.0% of families and 29.6% of the population living below the poverty line, including 71.4% of those under 18 and none of those over 64.

== Education ==
It is within the Highland School District which operates Highland High School.

It was served by the Williford School District until July 1, 2004, when it consolidated with the Randolph County School District to form the Twin Rivers School District. On July 1, 2010, the Twin Rivers district was dissolved. Twin Rivers district previously operated the Williford Campus.

The first school in the community opened in a building also used for church services. A dedicated building opened in 1890, and replacements opened circa 1915 and the early 1930s. The final elementary building opened in 1971.
