= Ravenden Springs, Arkansas =

- Town
- Location of Ravenden Springs in Randolph County, Arkansas.
- Coordinates: 36°18′46″N 91°13′24″W
- Country: United States
- State: Arkansas
- County: Randolph

Area
  - Total: 1.17 sq mi (3.02 km^{2})
  - Land: 1.17 sq mi (3.02 km^{2})
  - Water: 0 sq mi (0.00 km^{2})
- Elevation: 417 ft (127 m)

Population (2020)
  - Total: 119
  - Estimate (2025): 121 ▲
  - Density: 102.1/sq mi (39.44/km^{2})
- Time zone: UTC-6 (Central (CST))
  - Summer (DST): UTC-5 (CDT)
- ZIP code: 72460
- Area code: 870
- FIPS code: 05-58280
- GNIS feature ID: 2407177

Ravenden Springs is a town in Randolph County, Arkansas, United States. The population was 119 at the 2020 census.

== History ==
The town was established in 1883 by businessman R. D. Welsh, who visited the area upon hearing stories about a local Methodist Minister, William Bailey, who claimed to have found healing springs due to a recurring dream. Welsh, impressed with what he saw in the area, organized a stock company to build a resort town around the springs. The town gained many seasonal visitors by the turn of the century, but by the 1930s it began to decline.

== Geography ==
According to the United States Census Bureau, the town has a total area of 3.0 km^{2} (1.1 mi^{2}), all land.

- Highway 90 is the only highway that passes through the town.

== Demographics ==
Historical population
Census	Pop.	Note	%±
1910	189		—
1920	191		1.1%
1930	175		−8.4%
1940	200		14.3%
1950	197		−1.5%
1960	126		−36.0%
1970	107		−15.1%
1980	230		115.0%
1990	131		−43.0%
2000	137		4.6%
2010	118		−13.9%
2020	119		0.8%
2025 (est.)	121	▲	1.7%
U.S. Decennial Census

As of the census of 2000, there were 137 people, 63 households, and 38 families residing in the town. The population density was 46.0/km^{2} (119.4/mi^{2}). There were 83 housing units at an average density of 27.9/km^{2} (72.3/mi^{2}). The racial makeup of the town was 100.00% White.

There were 63 households, out of which 23.8% had children under the age of 18 living with them, 49.2% were married couples living together, 7.9% had a female householder with no husband present, and 38.1% were non-families. 33.3% of all households were made up of individuals, and 23.8% had someone living alone who was 65 years of age or older. The average household size was 2.17 and the average family size was 2.79.

In the town, the population was spread out, with 18.2% under the age of 18, 8.0% from 18 to 24, 26.3% from 25 to 44, 22.6% from 45 to 64, and 24.8% who were 65 years of age or older. The median age was 43 years. For every 100 females, there were 82.7 males. For every 100 females age 18 and over, there were 72.3 males.

The median income for a household in the town was $19,688, and the median income for a family was $23,438. Males had a median income of $21,667 versus $21,250 for females. The per capita income for the town was $13,342. There were 5.7% of families and 10.5% of the population living below the poverty line, including 12.5% of under eighteens and 12.2% of those over 64.

== Education ==
All or portions of Ravenden Springs is provided public education for elementary and secondary students from Sloan-Hendrix School District, which leads students to graduate from Sloan-Hendrix High School.

It was served by the Randolph County School District until July 1, 2004, when it consolidated with the Williford School District to form the Twin Rivers School District. On July 1, 2010, the Twin Rivers district was dissolved. Pocahontas school district received a portion of the Twin Rivers district. The Twin Rivers district operated the Oak Ridge Central Campus in an unincorporated area near Ravenden Springs.
