= Randolph County School District (Arkansas) =

Defunct school district in Arkansas, United States

Randolph County School District, also known as Oak Ridge Central Schools (ORC), was a school district based in Randolph County, Arkansas, near Ravenden Springs. The district had elementary and high school divisions.

On July 1, 2004 the district merged with the Williford School District to form the Twin Rivers School District. On July 1, 2010, the Twin Rivers district was dissolved, and both of the district's schools were closed at the time of the dissolution. Sections of the former Randolph County school district were reassigned to the Mammoth Spring, Maynard, Pocahontas, and Sloan-Hendrix districts.
