= Forest Heights Elementary School =

Forest Heights Elementary School may refer to:

- Forest Heights Elementary School (Arkansas) - located in Harrison, Arkansas and a National Blue Ribbon School; administered by Harrison School District.
- Forest Heights Elementary School (Maryland) - located in Oxon Hill, Maryland.
- Forest Heights Elementary School (North Carolina) - located in Gastonia, North Carolina administered by Gaston Public Schools.
- Forest Heights Elementary School (South Carolina) - located in Columbia, South Carolina.
