= Williford School District =

Defunct school district in Arkansas, United States

Williford School District was a school district based in Williford, Arkansas. The district had elementary and high school divisions. The mascot was the Williford Indians.

On July 1, 2004 the district merged with the Randolph County School District to form the Twin Rivers School District. On July 1, 2010, the Twin Rivers district was dissolved, and both of the district's schools were closed at the time of the dissolution. Sections of the former Williford school district were reassigned to the Highland, Hillcrest, and Sloan-Hendrix districts.
