= Ash Flat, Arkansas =

- City
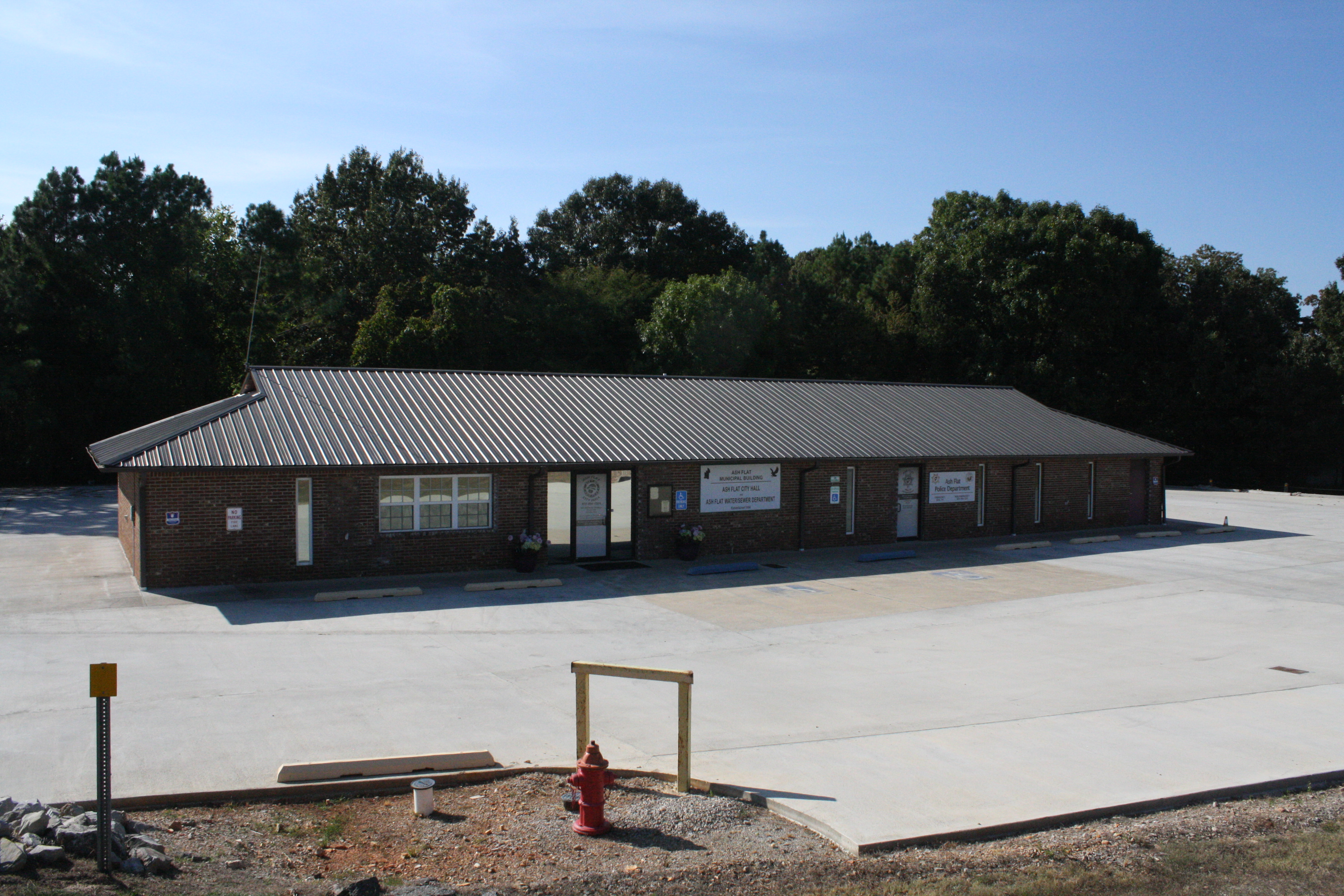
- Ash Flat City Hall

- Flag

- Location of Ash Flat in Fulton County and Sharp County, Arkansas.

- Location in Arkansas
- Coordinates: 36°13′52″N 91°36′33″W
- Country: United States
- State: Arkansas
- Counties: Sharp, Fulton

Area
  - Total: 6.32 sq mi (16.36 km^{2})
  - Land: 6.32 sq mi (16.36 km^{2})
  - Water: 0 sq mi (0.00 km^{2})
- Elevation: 643 ft (196 m)

Population (2020)
  - Total: 1,137
  - Estimate (2025): 1,156 ▲
  - Density: 180.1/sq mi (69.52/km^{2})
- Time zone: UTC-6 (Central (CST))
  - Summer (DST): UTC-5 (CDT)
- ZIP code: 72513
- Area code: 870
- FIPS code: 05-02470
- GNIS feature ID: 2403116
- Website: www.ash-flat.com

Ash Flat is a city in Fulton and Sharp counties in the U.S. state of Arkansas with a population of 1,137 in 2020. It is the county seat of Sharp County.

== History ==
Ash Flat was established in 1856. The community was so named for a grove of ash trees near the original town site.

In 1967, the Arkansas General Assembly designated Ash Flat as the single county seat of Sharp County, a title previously held by Hardy and Evening Shade concurrently.

== Geography ==
Ash Flat is located at 36°13′52″N 91°36′33″W (36.231107, -91.609163).

According to the United States Census Bureau, the city has a total area of 6.1 square miles (15.9 km^{2}), all land.

== Demographics ==
Historical population
Census	Pop.	Note	%±
1940	315		—
1950	265		−15.9%
1960	192		−27.5%
1970	211		9.9%
1980	524		148.3%
1990	667		27.3%
2000	977		46.5%
2010	1,082		10.7%
2020	1,137		5.1%
2025 (est.)	1,156	▲	1.7%
U.S. Decennial Census

=== 2020 census ===
Ash Flat racial composition
Race	Number	Percentage
White (non-Hispanic)	1,027	90.33%
Black or African American (non-Hispanic)	6	0.53%
Native American	12	1.06%
Asian	8	0.7%
Other/Mixed	50	4.4%
Hispanic or Latino	34	2.99%

As of the 2020 census, Ash Flat had a population of 1,137. The median age was 49.8 years. 22.7% of residents were under the age of 18 and 30.3% were 65 years of age or older. For every 100 females, there were 81.9 males, and for every 100 females age 18 and over, there were 79.0 males.

0.0% of residents lived in urban areas, while 100.0% lived in rural areas.

There were 395 households in Ash Flat, of which 32.2% had children under the age of 18 living in them. Of all households, 41.5% were married-couple households, 15.9% were households with a male householder and no spouse or partner present, and 39.0% were households with a female householder and no spouse or partner present. About 35.4% of all households were made up of individuals, and 19.5% had someone living alone who was 65 years of age or older.

There were 451 housing units, of which 12.4% were vacant. The homeowner vacancy rate was 3.3%, and the rental vacancy rate was 4.9%.

=== 2010 census ===
As of the 2010 United States census, there were 1,082 people living in the city. The racial makeup of the city was 96.8% White, 0.5% Black, 0.5% Native American and 1.5% from two or more races. 0.8% were Hispanic or Latino of any race.

=== 2000 census ===
As of the census of 2000, there were 977 people, 430 households, and 233 families living in the city. The population density was 175.7 inhabitants per square mile (67.8/km^{2}). There were 485 housing units at an average density of 87.2 per square mile (33.7/km^{2}). The racial makeup of the city was 98.57% White, 0.41% Black or African American, 0.20% Native American, and 0.82% from two or more races. 0.72% of the population were Hispanic or Latino of any race.

There were 430 households, out of which 24.0% had children under the age of 18 living with them, 42.1% were married couples living together, 10.5% had a female householder with no husband present, and 45.8% were non-families. 41.4% of all households were made up of individuals, and 27.7% had someone living alone who was 65 years of age or older. The average household size was 2.09 and the average family size was 2.91.

In the city, the population was spread out, with 21.6% under the age of 18, 5.7% from 18 to 24, 20.5% from 25 to 44, 20.6% from 45 to 64, and 31.6% who were 65 years of age or older. The median age was 47 years. For every 100 females, there were 72.9 males. For every 100 females age 18 and over, there were 70.6 males.

The median income for a household in the city was $16,797, and the median income for a family was $22,019. Males had a median income of $24,815 versus $15,556 for females. The per capita income for the city was $11,506. About 24.5% of families and 31.7% of the population were below the poverty line, including 42.2% of those under age 18 and 22.6% of those age 65 or over.

== Notable people ==
- Gordon Carpenter, Olympic gold medalist in basketball
- Preacher Roe, major league baseball player

== Education ==
Ash Flat is served by the Highland School District, which operates Highland High School. The Highland district was formed from the 1962 consolidation of the Ash Flat School District and the Hardy School District. Due to the previous rivalry between the two districts, some members of the community were unsure whether the vote to consolidate would succeed.

Ozarka College established a site in Ash Flat in the fall of 2001.
