= Twin Rivers School District =

Defunct school district in Arkansas, United States

Location
- Lawrence, Randolph, and Sharp counties, Arkansas; United States

District information
- Grades: K-12
- Established: July 1, 2004
- Closed: July 1, 2010
- Schools: 2

Other information
- Website: Official website (archive)

Twin Rivers School District was a school district in Lawrence, Randolph, and Sharp counties in Arkansas. It was headquartered in the Oak Ridge Central Campus in unincorporated Randolph County, near Ravenden Springs. It served various communities, including Ravenden Springs.

== History ==
It was established on July 1, 2004 by the merger of the Randolph County School District and the Williford School District. The two districts merged because of a law enacted in 2004 requiring smaller school districts to consolidate into larger ones. The Rural School and Community Trust stated that "Twin Rivers supporters say that the district has struggled" from the beginning.

Beginning in the 2007-2008 school year, the district was on academic probation from the Arkansas authorities. The school district was in violation of accreditation standards. On February 5, 2010 the superintendent, David Gilliland, resigned from his position. Harvison failed to inform the school board of the fact that the Arkansas state government was considering closing the school district, and this made parents upset when they discovered the lack of informing.

In February 2010, the Arkansas Board of Education (ADE) voted to take control of the district and dissolve it, giving sections of the district to neighboring districts. The rationale was the lack of accreditation, and this was the first school district in Arkansas to be closed for that reason. A group of parents sued the ADE; the group " Save Our Twin Rivers School District", made up of about 900 people, held fundraisers for the lawsuit. A group of parents leading the Ozark Band of Cherokees Inc. emphasized their Native American heritage in an effort to prevent the state from closing the district. Leslie Newell Peacock of the Arkansas Times wrote that "The closing has been traumatic to parents in the district, many of whom have deep roots in the communities served by the schools and once attended the schools themselves." Supporters lobbied the Arkansas Supreme Court in an attempt to stop the closure.

On July 1, 2010, the district was dissolved. Portions were given to the following school districts: Highland, Hillcrest, Mammoth Spring, Maynard, Pocahontas, and Sloan-Hendrix. Both of the district's schools were closed at the time of the dissolution.

== Schools ==
It operated two schools serving grades K-12: Oak Ridge Central Campus in Randolph County and Williford Campus in Williford.
