= 1964 United States presidential election in Arkansas =

- November 3, 1964

Nominee	Lyndon B. Johnson	Barry Goldwater
Party	Democratic	Republican
Home state	Texas	Arizona
Running mate	Hubert Humphrey	William E. Miller
Electoral vote	6	0
Popular vote	314,197	243,264
Percentage	56.06%	43.41%
County results
Johnson
40–50%
50–60%
60–70%
Goldwater
50–60%
President before election
Lyndon B. Johnson
Democratic
Elected President
Lyndon B. Johnson
Democratic

The 1964 presidential election in Arkansas was held on November 3, 1964, as part of the 1964 United States presidential election. State voters chose six electors, or representatives to the Electoral College, who voted for president and vice president. Incumbent President Lyndon B. Johnson won the state of Arkansas with 56.06% of the popular vote, which was a substantial increase upon John F. Kennedy's 50.19% from the preceding election, although the Republican vote remained virtually unchanged at 43.41%. Johnson won all but ten of Arkansas' seventy-five counties, and all four congressional districts. With Mississippi, Alabama, Georgia, and South Carolina voting for Goldwater, Arkansas became the last Southern state to have never voted for a Republican candidate since the end of Reconstruction.

== Results ==
1964 United States presidential election in Arkansas
Party	Candidate	Votes	Percentage	Electoral votes
Democratic	Lyndon Johnson (inc.)	314,197	56.06%	6
Republican	Barry Goldwater	243,264	43.41%	0
National States' Rights	John Kasper	2,965	0.53%	0
Totals		560,426	100.00%	6
Voter turnout (Voting age/Registered Voters)				50.6%/78.3%

=== Results by county ===
County	Lyndon B. Johnson Democratic		Barry Goldwater Republican		John Kasper National States’ Rights		Margin		Total votes cast
County	#	%	#	%	#	%	#	%	Total votes cast
Arkansas	3,200	45.78%	3,769	53.92%	21	0.30%	-569	-8.14%	6,990
Ashley	2,901	43.23%	3,742	55.77%	67	1.00%	-841	-12.54%	6,710
Baxter	2,900	59.29%	1,986	40.61%	5	0.10%	914	18.68%	4,891
Benton	5,655	48.49%	5,977	51.25%	30	0.26%	-322	-2.76%	11,662
Boone	3,770	56.73%	2,857	42.99%	19	0.29%	913	13.74%	6,646
Bradley	2,229	54.34%	1,852	45.15%	21	0.51%	377	9.19%	4,102
Calhoun	1,409	60.68%	889	38.29%	24	1.03%	520	22.39%	2,322
Carroll	2,005	48.78%	2,105	51.22%	0	0.00%	-100	-2.44%	4,110
Chicot	2,916	59.47%	1,972	40.22%	15	0.31%	944	19.25%	4,903
Clark	4,127	68.36%	1,884	31.21%	26	0.43%	2,243	37.15%	6,037
Clay	3,280	61.64%	1,999	37.57%	42	0.79%	1,281	24.07%	5,321
Cleburne	2,645	68.26%	1,221	31.51%	9	0.23%	1,424	36.75%	3,875
Cleveland	1,121	51.78%	1,026	47.39%	18	0.83%	95	4.39%	2,165
Columbia	3,485	46.26%	4,009	53.22%	39	0.52%	-524	-6.96%	7,533
Conway	4,205	63.69%	2,378	36.02%	19	0.29%	1,827	27.67%	6,602
Craighead	8,334	61.55%	5,163	38.13%	44	0.32%	3,171	23.42%	13,541
Crawford	3,537	51.62%	3,294	48.07%	21	0.31%	243	3.55%	6,852
Crittenden	4,168	50.20%	4,065	48.96%	69	0.83%	103	1.24%	8,302
Cross	2,421	52.86%	2,147	46.88%	12	0.26%	274	5.98%	4,580
Dallas	1,779	51.61%	1,625	47.14%	43	1.25%	154	4.47%	3,447
Desha	3,294	62.91%	1,930	36.86%	12	0.23%	1,364	26.05%	5,236
Drew	1,980	48.05%	2,109	51.18%	32	0.78%	-129	-3.13%	4,121
Faulkner	6,116	64.95%	3,259	34.61%	42	0.45%	2,857	30.34%	9,417
Franklin	2,685	62.47%	1,580	36.76%	33	0.77%	1,105	25.71%	4,298
Fulton	1,704	66.64%	846	33.09%	7	0.27%	858	33.55%	2,557
Garland	11,591	53.59%	9,952	46.01%	86	0.40%	1,639	7.58%	21,629
Grant	1,678	55.07%	1,308	42.93%	61	2.00%	370	12.14%	3,047
Greene	4,742	67.39%	2,271	32.27%	24	0.34%	2,471	35.12%	7,037
Hempstead	3,355	56.95%	2,493	42.32%	43	0.73%	862	14.63%	5,891
Hot Spring	4,543	60.40%	2,911	38.70%	68	0.90%	1,632	21.70%	7,522
Howard	1,320	43.10%	1,649	53.84%	94	3.07%	-329	-10.74%	3,063
Independence	4,455	64.01%	2,470	35.49%	35	0.50%	1,985	28.52%	6,960
Izard	1,736	69.83%	726	29.20%	24	0.97%	1,010	40.63%	2,486
Jackson	4,651	68.12%	2,141	31.36%	36	0.53%	2,510	36.76%	6,828
Jefferson	12,872	56.04%	9,968	43.40%	129	0.56%	2,904	12.64%	22,969
Johnson	3,127	66.77%	1,535	32.78%	21	0.45%	1,592	33.99%	4,683
Lafayette	1,484	50.02%	1,476	49.75%	7	0.24%	8	0.27%	2,967
Lawrence	3,498	63.16%	2,013	36.35%	27	0.49%	1,485	26.81%	5,538
Lee	2,335	58.21%	1,668	41.59%	8	0.20%	667	16.62%	4,011
Lincoln	2,468	63.58%	1,410	36.32%	4	0.10%	1,058	27.26%	3,882
Little River	2,040	63.87%	1,141	35.72%	13	0.41%	899	28.15%	3,194
Logan	3,604	61.13%	2,265	38.42%	27	0.46%	1,339	22.71%	5,896
Lonoke	3,818	51.06%	3,636	48.63%	23	0.31%	182	2.43%	7,477
Madison	2,715	57.45%	1,997	42.26%	14	0.30%	718	15.19%	4,726
Marion	1,661	60.20%	1,088	39.43%	10	0.36%	573	20.77%	2,759
Miller	5,190	54.68%	4,253	44.81%	49	0.52%	937	9.87%	9,492
Mississippi	8,678	58.20%	6,213	41.67%	20	0.13%	2,465	16.53%	14,911
Monroe	2,258	53.29%	1,968	46.45%	11	0.26%	290	6.84%	4,237
Montgomery	1,358	61.67%	832	37.78%	12	0.54%	526	23.89%	2,202
Nevada	2,190	60.41%	1,406	38.79%	29	0.80%	784	21.62%	3,625
Newton	1,374	49.62%	1,357	49.01%	38	1.37%	17	0.61%	2,769
Ouachita	7,056	65.96%	3,572	33.39%	70	0.65%	3,484	32.57%	10,698
Perry	1,320	55.30%	1,048	43.90%	19	0.80%	272	11.40%	2,387
Phillips	5,818	59.43%	3,963	40.48%	9	0.09%	1,855	18.95%	9,790
Pike	1,531	54.93%	1,241	44.53%	15	0.54%	290	10.40%	2,787
Poinsett	5,635	64.93%	3,031	34.92%	13	0.15%	2,604	30.01%	8,679
Polk	2,575	55.88%	2,022	43.88%	11	0.24%	553	12.00%	4,608
Pope	4,972	63.91%	2,651	34.07%	157	2.02%	2,321	29.84%	7,780
Prairie	1,812	54.74%	1,476	44.59%	22	0.66%	336	10.15%	3,310
Pulaski	40,535	51.12%	38,312	48.32%	442	0.56%	2,223	2.80%	79,289
Randolph	2,680	66.85%	1,312	32.73%	17	0.42%	1,368	34.12%	4,009
St. Francis	3,651	51.88%	3,377	47.98%	10	0.14%	274	3.90%	7,038
Saline	5,605	60.18%	3,628	38.96%	80	0.86%	1,977	21.22%	9,313
Scott	1,838	62.01%	1,121	37.82%	5	0.17%	717	24.19%	2,964
Searcy	1,508	47.68%	1,649	52.13%	6	0.19%	-141	-4.45%	3,163
Sebastian	10,299	43.84%	13,110	55.80%	84	0.36%	-2,811	-11.96%	23,493
Sevier	2,123	62.75%	1,249	36.92%	11	0.33%	874	25.83%	3,383
Sharp	1,810	59.40%	1,215	39.88%	22	0.72%	595	19.52%	3,047
Stone	1,374	58.72%	942	40.26%	24	1.03%	432	18.46%	2,340
Union	6,948	44.60%	8,472	54.38%	160	1.03%	-1,524	-9.78%	15,580
Van Buren	2,054	61.28%	1,270	37.89%	28	0.84%	784	23.39%	3,352
Washington	10,166	59.55%	6,856	40.16%	48	0.28%	3,310	19.39%	17,070
White	6,566	56.20%	5,023	42.99%	95	0.81%	1,543	13.21%	11,684
Woodruff	2,307	62.47%	1,366	36.99%	20	0.54%	941	25.48%	3,693
Yell	3,407	68.86%	1,527	30.86%	14	0.28%	1,880	38.00%	4,948
Totals	314,197	56.06%	243,264	43.41%	2,965	0.53%	70,933	12.65%	560,426

==== Counties that flipped from Republican to Democratic ====
- Baxter
- Boone
- Clay
- Craighead
- Crawford
- Fulton
- Garland
- Independence
- Madison
- Marion
- Montgomery
- Newton
- Polk
- Pike
- Randolph
- Scott
- Sharp
- Stone
- Washington

==== Counties that flipped from Democratic to Republican ====
- Arkansas
- Ashley
- Columbia
- Drew
- Howard
- Union

== Analysis ==
Given the segregationism of its long-serving governor Orval Faubus, who had gained almost seven percent of the vote in the preceding presidential election, Arkansas would have seemed potentially likely to succumb to Goldwater due to his opposition to the recent Civil Rights Act. However, the GOP's nomination of the moderate Winthrop Rockefeller in the party's first serious run for governor in the state since Reconstruction took the steam out of a Goldwater challenge. Faubus refused to endorse Goldwater, despite hesitating over this during the summer. In addition, many white Southerners commented to the effect that

Goldwater is right on the black man, and that is very important. But he is so wrong on everything else I can't bring myself to vote for him.

In mid-July, Texas Governor John Connally had made private polls suggesting that Johnson would lose Arkansas, in addition to the Deep South states of Mississippi and Alabama which were leaning heavily towards Goldwater. Nonetheless, that the increase in black registration in Arkansas had exceeded Kennedy's margin in 1960 suggested that Johnson's civil rights legislation did have some potential to help him, and in early August polls suddenly became confident Johnson would carry the state due to Goldwater's policies of privatizing Social Security and expanding the war in Southeast Asia – a policy that did not play well in this isolationist state. By October, a New York Times poll saw Arkansas as "safe" for Johnson and his leads in polls increased as election day came closer.

Ultimately, Johnson comfortably carried Arkansas, becoming the twenty-third and last consecutive Democratic presidential nominee to win the state; however, anti-civil rights sentiment did cause Arkansas to vote 9.92 percentage points more Republican than the nation at-large – this being the first time in 96 years when it voted less Democratic than the nation.

Johnson doubled Kennedy's margin, and reclaimed the counties of Clay, Craighead, Fulton, Marion, Randolph and Sharp, which in 1960 had defected to the GOP for the first time ever or since Reconstruction as a result of powerful anti-Catholicism. Johnson also claimed thirteen other Ozark counties which had supported Nixon in 1960.

However, in the Delta and south of the state sufficient backlash against black civil rights occurred for Goldwater to claim six counties in those regions from the Democrats. Of these, only state namesake Arkansas County had ever been carried by a Republican since the McKinley era. (Note: Arkansas County had voted for Warren G. Harding in 1920 and for Dwight D. Eisenhower in both 1952 and 1956.) Ashley County and Drew County voted Republican for the first time since James G. Blaine in 1884, Union County for the first time since 1872, and Columbia and Howard Counties for the first time ever.

== See also ==
- United States presidential elections in Arkansas
