= Williford Methodist Church =

Historic church in Arkansas, United States

- U.S. National Register of Historic Places
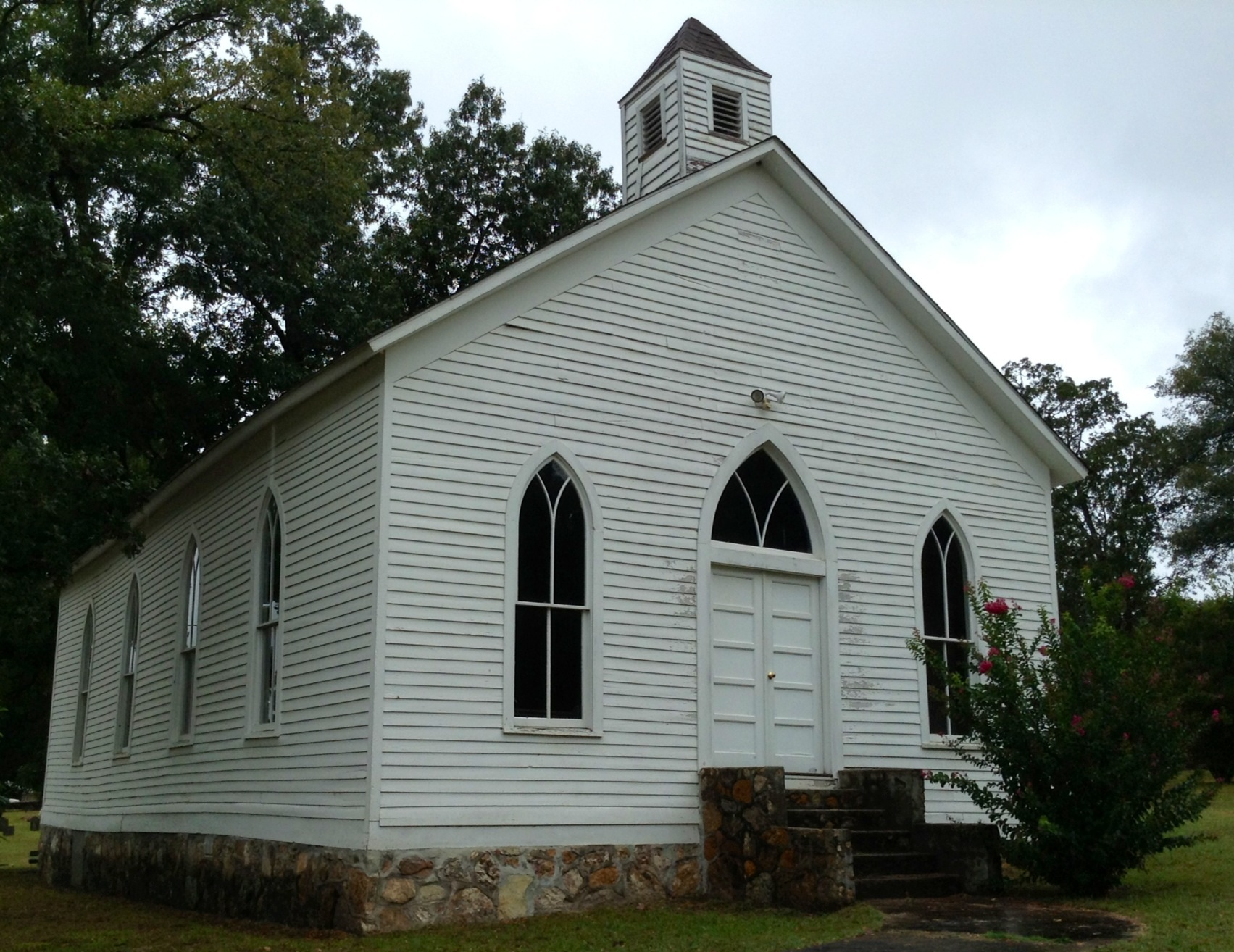

- Location within Arkansas Location within the United States
- Location: NW of jct. of Ferguson and Hail Sts., Williford, Arkansas
- Coordinates: 36°15′10″N 91°21′34″W
- Area: less than one acre
- Built: 1910
- Architect: Beavers, Richard
- Architectural style: Late Gothic Revival
- NRHP reference No.: 92001629
- Added to NRHP: November 27, 1992

The Williford Methodist Church is a historic church at the northwest corner of Ferguson and Hail Streets in the middle of Williford, Arkansas. It is a single-story wood-frame structure, with a gable roof and stone foundation. It has Gothic Revival pointed-arch windows and a small belfry with a pyramidal roof. The interior contains original pews and pulpit. Built c. 1910, the building is locally notable for its distinctive vernacular Gothic Revival architecture, and as the first purpose-built church building in the community.

The building was listed on the National Register of Historic Places in 1992.

== See also ==
- National Register of Historic Places listings in Sharp County, Arkansas
