= Pocahontas High School (Arkansas) =

Location
- 2312 Stadium Drive; Pocahontas, Arkansas 72455; United States; 36°16′51″N 90°58′55″W

Information
- School type: Public comprehensive
- School district: Pocahontas School District
- CEEB code: 042070
- NCES School ID: 051161000884
- Grades: 10–12
- Enrollment: 384 (2023-2024)
- Student to teacher ratio: 4.35
- Education system: ADE Smart Core
- Classes offered: Regular, Advanced Placement (AP)
- Colors: Red and white
- Athletics conference: 4A Region 3 (2012–14)
- Team name: Pocahontas Redskins
- Accreditation: ADE; AdvancED (1936–)
- Website: www.pocahontaspsd.com/o/phs

Pocahontas High School is a comprehensive public high school located in Pocahontas, Arkansas, United States. The school provides secondary education for students in grades 10 through 12. It is one of two public high schools in Randolph County, Arkansas and the sole high school administered by the Pocahontas School District.

== Curriculum ==
The assumed course of study follows the Smart Core curriculum developed by the Arkansas Department of Education (ADE), which requires students complete 22 units prior to graduation (24 for Honors or Student of Distinction). Students complete regular coursework and exams and may take Advanced Placement (AP) courses and exam with the opportunity to receive college credit. In addition, PHS has a concurrent credit agreement with Black River Technical College (BRTC) for students taking selected instructor-led and online courses.

The school is accredited by the ADE and has been accredited by AdvancED since 1936.

== Extracurricular activities ==
The Pocahontas High School mascot is the Redskins with red and white serving as the school colors. It is notable that the community continues to use a controversial epithet as its mascot even as the NFL football team that once shared the name, as well as nearby Arkansas State University, have discontinued their use of what are believed by some to be harmful slurs and stereotypes against American Indians.

=== Athletics ===
The Pocahontas Redskins compete in interscholastic activities within the 4A Classification—the state's fourth largest classification—via the 4A Region 2 Conference administered by the Arkansas Activities Association. The Redskins field teams in football, golf (boys/girls), volleyball, tennis (boys/girls), basketball (boys/girls), track and field (boys/girls), baseball, softball, competitive cheer and dance, and swim (boys/girls).

== Notable people ==
- Ed Bethune (1953)—Politician; member of the U.S. House of Representatives (1979–85).
- Wear Schoonover (1928)—Athlete; inductee to College Football Hall of Fame; charter inductee to Arkansas Sports Hall of Fame.
- Trey Steimel, member of the Arkansas House of Representatives

== See also ==
- Native American mascot controversy
- Sports teams named Redskins
