= Ozark Acres, Arkansas =

- Census-designated place
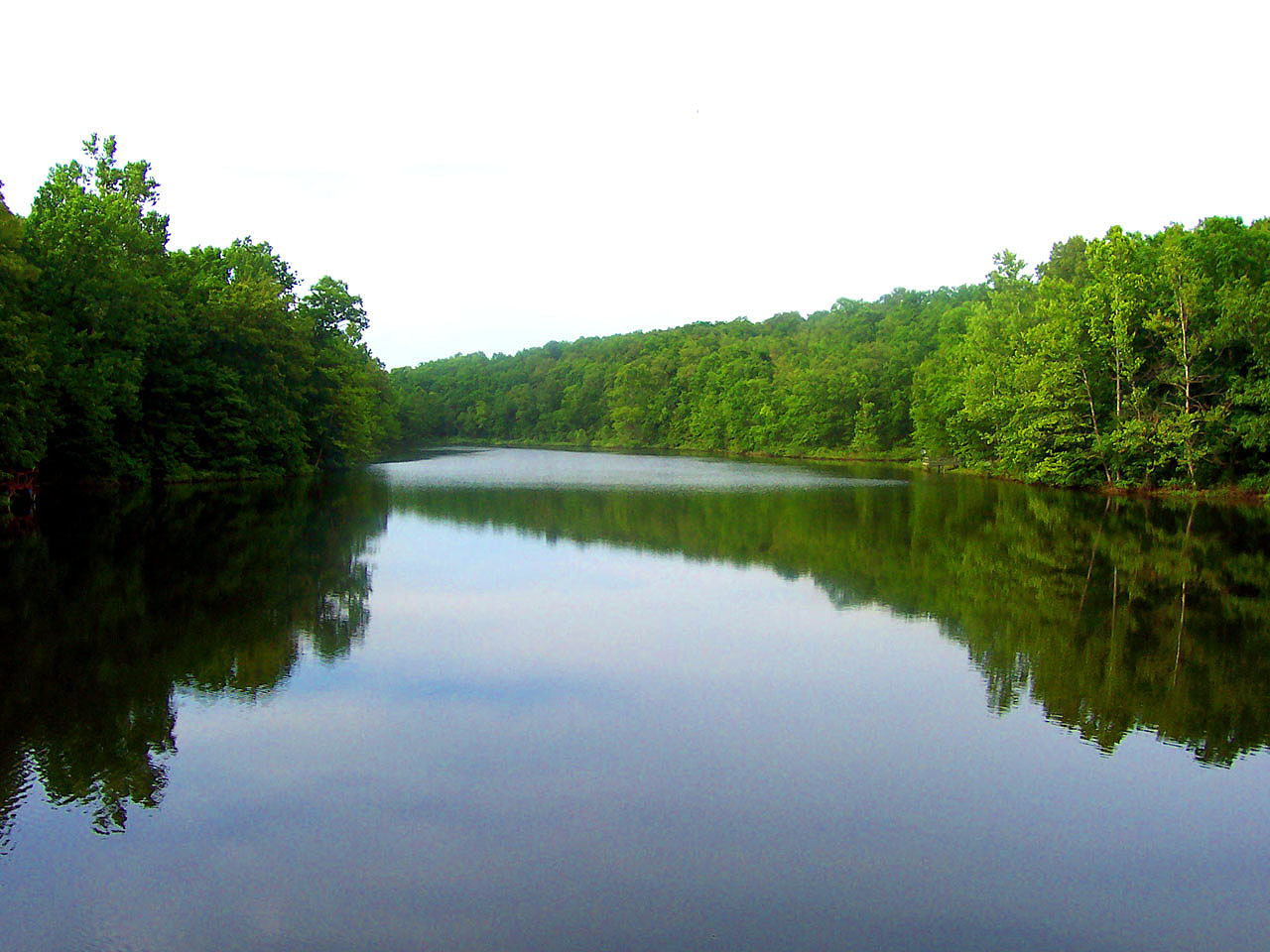
- A photo of Spring Lake in Ozark Acres, Arkansas. Spring Lake is one of two lakes in the area.

- Location within Arkansas
- Coordinates: 36°18′26″N 91°23′15″W
- Country: United States
- State: Arkansas
- County: Sharp
- Elevation: 705 ft (215 m)
- Time zone: UTC-6 (Central (CST))
  - Summer (DST): UTC-5 (CDT)
- GNIS feature ID: 2805672

Ozark Acres is an unincorporated community, census-designated place (CDP), Suburban Improvement District (SID), and a Deeded Community in Sharp County, Arkansas, United States. It was first listed as a CDP in the 2020 census with a population of 692.

== Geography ==
Ozark Acres is located at 36°18′26″N 91°23′15″W (36.30717, -91.38747).

One of the most notable geographic features of Ozark Acres is the abundance of hills, lakes, and rivers. In fact, one of the most popular places in Ozark Acres is Lake Vagabond, which is a private man-made lake / beach. Open usually from May to early Autumn, Lake Vagabond is used both for fishing and swimming.

The second lake, Spring Lake, is much smaller and fed by a natural spring, as the name suggests. While it has no beaches for swimming, it is also a private lake and open year-round.

== Demographics ==
Historical population
Census	Pop.	Note	%±
2020	692		—
U.S. Decennial Census; 2020

=== 2020 census ===
Ozark Acres CDP, Arkansas – Demographic Profile (NH = Non-Hispanic) Note: the US Census treats Hispanic/Latino as an ethnic category. This table excludes Latinos from the racial categories and assigns them to a separate category. Hispanics/Latinos may be of any race.
Race / Ethnicity	Pop 2020	% 2020
White alone (NH)	617	89.16%
Black or African American alone (NH)	1	0.14%
Native American or Alaska Native alone (NH)	1	0.14%
Asian alone (NH)	1	0.14%
Pacific Islander alone (NH)	0	0.00%
Some Other Race alone (NH)	4	0.58%
Mixed Race/Multi-Racial (NH)	55	7.95%
Hispanic or Latino (any race)	13	1.88%
Total	692	100.00%
