= Clarksville High School (Arkansas) =

Location
- 2022 W. Clark Rd; Clarksville, Arkansas 72830; United States

Information
- Status: Open
- School district: Clarksville School District
- NCES District ID: 0504380
- Authority: Arkansas Department of Education (ADE)
- CEEB code: 040460
- NCES School ID: 050438000166
- Teaching staff: 46.31 (FTE)
- Grades: 10-12
- Enrollment: 576 (2023-2024)
  - Grade 10: 205
  - Grade 11: 192
  - Grade 12: 178
- Student to teacher ratio: 12.44
- Education system: ADE Smart Core curriculum
- Classes offered: Regular; Career Focus; Advanced Placement (AP)
- Colors: Red and white
- Athletics conference: 5A West (2012-14)
- Mascot: Panther
- Team name: Clarksville Panthers
- Yearbook: The Panther
- Feeder schools: Clarksville Junior High School
- Affiliation: Arkansas Activities Association
- Website: www.csdar.org/o/chs

Clarksville High School is a comprehensive public high school serving students in grades ten through twelve in Clarksville, Arkansas, United States. It is one of four public high schools in Johnson County and is the sole high school administered by the Clarksville School District. In 2012, Clarksville High School was nationally recognized as a bronze medalist by the U.S. News & World Report in its ranking of Best High Schools.

== Academics ==
The student body makeup is 49 percent male and 51 percent female, and the total minority enrollment is 27 percent. The assumed course of study follows the Smart Core curriculum developed the Arkansas Department of Education (ADE), which requires students to complete 22 credit units before graduation. Students engage in regular and Advanced Placement (AP) coursework and exams. Concurrent credit courses are offered on campus through Arkansas Tech University and off campus through the University of the Ozarks and University of Arkansas at Little Rock.

== Athletics ==
The Clarksville High School mascot is the panther with school colors of red and white.

The Clarksville Panthers participate in various interscholastic activities in the 5A West Conference administered by the Arkansas Activities Association. The school athletic activities include baseball, basketball (boys/girls), bowling, competitive cheer, cross country (boys/girls), football, golf (boys/girls), softball, swimming and diving (girls), tennis (boys/girls), volleyball, and wrestling. In addition, the school participates in the National Archery in the Schools educational program.

- Golf: The girls golf team won consecutive state championship titles in 2005 and 2006.
- Soccer: The boys soccer team won the 4A classification state soccer championship in 2024.
- Basketball:back-to-back Class 4A state championships during the 2010–11 and 2011–12.eatre, and International Thespian Society.

== History ==
The Clarksville High School Building No. 1 located on Main Street was added to the National Register of Historic Places on September 10, 1992. Built in 1936, it was noted as a particularly good example of Craftsman architecture, and for its importance in the city's educational history. The building has since been demolished.

== Notable alumni ==
- Red Hickey (1917–2006), former NFL player, coach and scout

- Clarksville High School Building No. 1
- U.S. National Register of Historic Places
- Location within Arkansas Location within the United States
- Location: Main St., Clarksville, Arkansas
- Coordinates: 35°28′17″N 93°28′20″W
- Area: less than one acre
- NRHP reference No.: 92001202
- Added to NRHP: September 10, 1992
