= Pottsville High School (Arkansas) =

Pottsvile High School

Location
- 500 Apache Drive; Pottsville, Arkansas 72858; United States; 35°14′51″N 93°2′31″W

Information
- Status: Open
- School district: Pottsville School District
- Superintendent: Houston Townsend
- CEEB code: 042090
- NCES School ID: 051170000891
- Principal: Jonathan Bradley
- Teaching staff: 26.21 (on FTE basis)
- Grades: 10–12
- Enrollment: 382 (2016-17)
- Education system: ADE Smart Core curriculum
- Classes offered: Regular, Advanced Placement
- Colors: Black and gold
- Athletics conference: 4A Region 4
- Mascot: Apache
- Team name: Pottsville Apaches
- Rival: Dardanelle High School
- Accreditation: ADE
- Website: phs.pottsvilleschools.org

.

Pottsville High School is a secondary school located in Pottsville, Arkansas, United States. The school was completed in 1998 and is administered by the Pottsville School District No. 61. The school serves more than 300 students in grades 10 through 12.

== Academics ==
The assumed course of study follows the Smart Core curriculum developed by the Arkansas Department of Education (ADE), which requires students complete 22 units prior to graduation. Students may select from regular coursework and exams and Advanced Placement (AP) courses and exams with the opportunity to obtain college credit.

== Facilities ==
The school was formerly located on the same campus as the Elementary and Middle schools, but a new building was built in 1998 with an addition installed in 2000 and features several facilities, including a complete chemistry lab several computer labs for technological learning. A new Junior High School was opened in February 2007 near the high school site.

== Extracurricular activities ==
The Pottsville High School teams honor the Apache with black and gold serving as the school colors. For 2012–14, the Pottsville Apaches compete in the 4A classification under the 4A Region 4 Conference as administered by the Arkansas Activities Association. The Apaches compete in baseball, basketball (boys/girls), band, competitive cheer, cross country (boys/girls), football, golf (boys/girls), softball, tennis (boys/girls), track & field (boys/girls)

- Cross country: In 1997, Pottsville won the boys' Class A state championship in cross country running.
- Basketball: The boys basketball team won the 4A state basketball championship in 2013 with a 54–50 win over the Dollarway Cardinals.
