= Cutter–Morning Star High School =

Location
- 2801 Spring Street; Hot Springs, Arkansas 71901; United States
- Coordinates: 34°30′15″N 92°59′24″W

Information
- Type: Public secondary
- School district: Cutter–Morning Star School District
- NCES District ID: 0504860
- CEEB code: 041143
- NCES School ID: 050486000210
- Administrator: Carolyn Bissell
- Teaching staff: 39.87 (on FTE basis)
- Grades: 7–12
- Enrollment: 316 (2023–2024)
- Student to teacher ratio: 7.93
- Campus type: Rural
- Colors: Red and black
- Athletics conference: 3A Region 6 (Football); 3A Region 8 (Basketball)
- Sports: Football, Golf, Cheer, Dance, Basketball, Baseball, Softball, Tennis, Track
- Mascot: Eagle
- Team name: Cutter–Morning Star Eagles
- Yearbook: The Eagle
- Affiliations: Arkansas Activities Association
- Website: www.eaglesnest.dsc.k12.ar.us/o/high-school

Cutter–Morning Star High School is a comprehensive public secondary school located in Hot Springs, Arkansas, United States. Cutter–Morning Star serves more than 300 students in grades 7 through 12. Cutter–Morning Star is one of seven public high schools in Garland County and is the sole high school administered by the Cutter–Morning Star School District. Cutter–Morning Star has won two national Quiz Bowl championships and its sports teams have won 18 state championships.

Its boundary includes a portion of Hot Springs.

== Academics ==
The assumed course of study for students is to complete the Smart Core curriculum developed by the Arkansas Department of Education (ADE), which requires students complete at least 22 units for graduation. Course offerings include regular (core and career focus) and Advanced Placement classes and exams with opportunities for college credit via AP exam. The school is accredited by the ADE.

In 2003 and 2004, Cutter–Morning Star High School Quiz Bowl teams won consecutive NAQT National High School Championship tournaments in the Small School division.

=== Fine Arts ===
Students may participate in various musical and performing arts including: band (e.g., concert band, jazz band), choir (e.g., a cappella, barbershop quartet, beauty shop quartet) and theater (e.g., competitive speech, drama, stagecraft). Students may participate in Art Club.

== Athletics ==
The Cutter–Morning Star High School mascot is the Eagle with the school colors of red and black.

For the 2012–14 seasons, the Cutter–Morning Star Eagles participate in the 2A Region 5 conference as administered by the Arkansas Activities Association. The Eagles compete in football, volleyball, golf (boys/girls), basketball (boys/girls), cheer, golf (boys/girls), baseball, and softball.

== Notable people ==
- Byron Alan Clark, Arkansas state senator from District 13, first elected in 2012; Hot Springs businessman
