= Highland, Arkansas =

- City
- Location of Highland in Sharp County, Arkansas.
- Coordinates: 36°16′11″N 91°31′18″W
- Country: United States
- State: Arkansas
- County: Sharp

Area
  - Total: 8.80 sq mi (22.79 km^{2})
  - Land: 8.74 sq mi (22.64 km^{2})
  - Water: 0.058 sq mi (0.15 km^{2})
- Elevation: 696 ft (212 m)

Population (2020)
  - Total: 982
  - Estimate (2025): 1,060 ▲
  - Density: 112.4/sq mi (43.38/km^{2})
- Time zone: UTC-6 (Central (CST))
  - Summer (DST): UTC-5 (CDT)
- ZIP code: 72542
- Area code: 870
- FIPS code: 05-32257
- GNIS feature ID: 2404698
- Website: cityofhighlandar.gov

Highland is a city in Sharp County, Arkansas, United States. The city was incorporated in 1998 and is located in Sharp County. It is the fourth largest city in Sharp County with an estimated population of 1,047 in 2024.

== Geography ==
Highland is located at 36°16′11″N 91°31′18″W (36.269749, -91.521773).

According to the United States Census Bureau, the city has a total area of 8.9 square miles (23.1 km^{2}), of which 8.8 square miles (22.9 km^{2}) is land and 0.077 square miles (0.2 km^{2}), or 0.66%, is water.

== Demographics ==
Historical population
Census	Pop.	Note	%±
2000	986		—
2010	1,045		6.0%
2020	982		−6.0%
2025 (est.)	1,060	▲	7.9%
U.S. Decennial Census

=== 2020 census ===
Highland racial composition
Race	Number	Percentage
White (non-Hispanic)	917	93.38%
Black or African American (non-Hispanic)	1	0.1%
Native American	3	0.31%
Other/Mixed	31	3.16%
Hispanic or Latino	30	3.05%

As of the 2020 United States census, there were 982 people, 454 households, and 277 families residing in the city.

=== 2000 census ===
As of the census of 2000, there were 986 people, 403 households, and 309 families residing in the city. The population density was 112.8 inhabitants per square mile (43.6/km^{2}). There were 501 housing units at an average density of 57.3 per square mile (22.1/km^{2}). The racial makeup of the city was 98.07% White, 0.41% Native American, 0.20% Asian, 0.10% from other races, and 1.22% from two or more races. 1.42% of the population were Hispanic or Latino of any race.

There were 403 households, out of which 29.5% had children under the age of 18 living with them, 60.3% were married couples living together, 10.9% had a female householder with no husband present, and 23.1% were non-families. 20.8% of all households were made up of individuals, and 9.7% had someone living alone who was 65 years of age or older. The average household size was 2.45 and the average family size was 2.78.

In the city, the population was spread out, with 24.3% under the age of 18, 6.1% from 18 to 24, 23.3% from 25 to 44, 25.7% from 45 to 64, and 20.6% who were 65 years of age or older. The median age was 42 years. For every 100 females, there were 98.8 males. For every 100 females age 18 and over, there were 96.3 males.

The median income for a household in the city was $28,929, and the median income for a family was $32,788. Males had a median income of $25,357 versus $15,938 for females. The per capita income for the city was $14,589. About 13.0% of families and 18.2% of the population were below the poverty line, including 25.2% of those under age 18 and 9.6% of those age 65 or over.

== Education ==
Public education for elementary and secondary school students is provided by Highland School District, which leads to graduation from Highland High School. Highland School Districts serves Ash Flat, Hardy, Highland and Cherokee Village.
