= Nashville High School (Arkansas) =

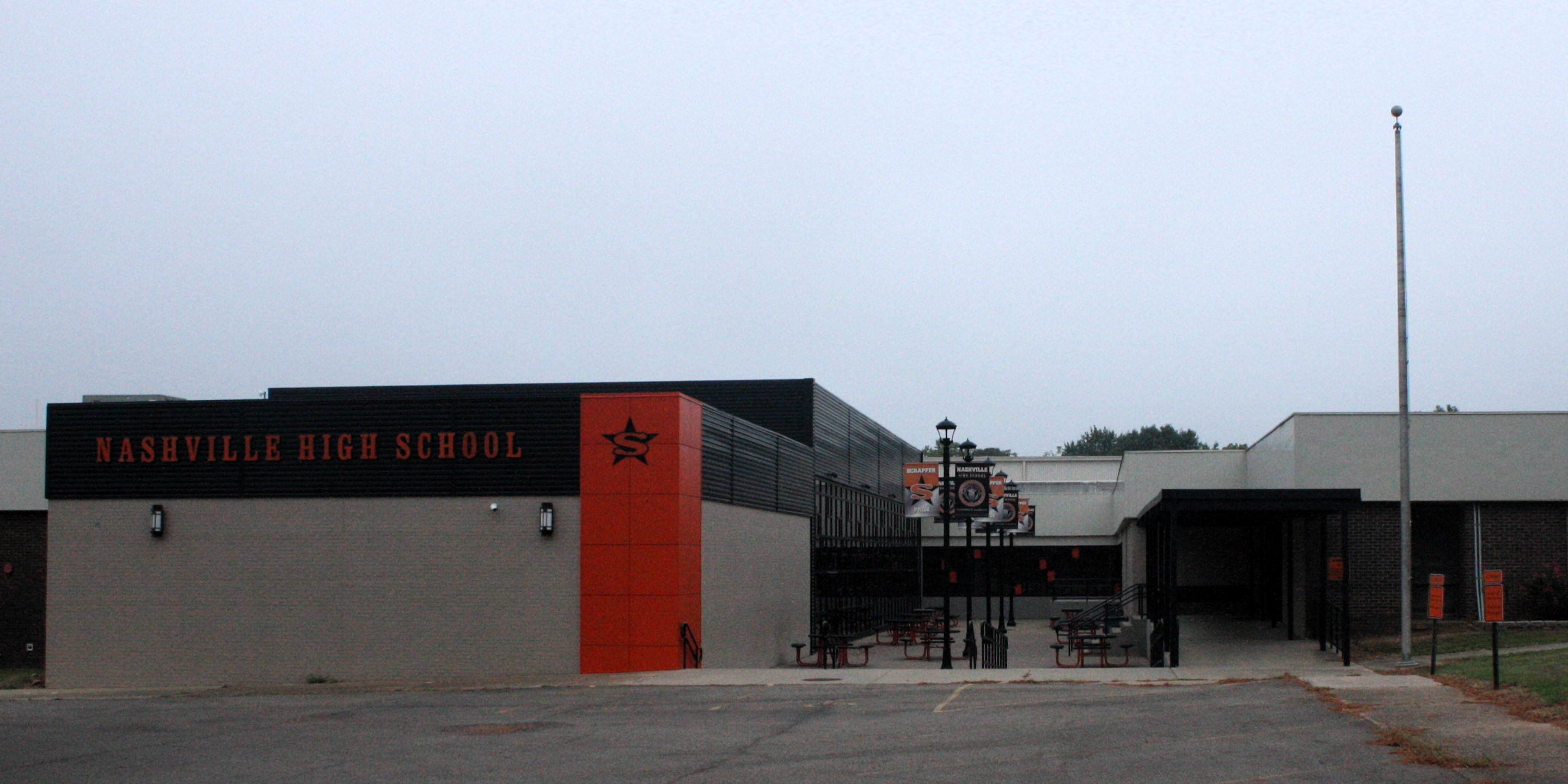

Location
- 1301 Mt Pleasant Drive; Nashville, Arkansas 71852; United States; 33°59′31″N 93°51′45″W

Information
- School type: Public comprehensive
- Founded: 1907 (119 years ago)
- Status: Open
- School district: Nashville School District
- CEEB code: 041810
- NCES School ID: 051038000757
- Principal: Tate Gordon
- Teaching staff: 48.28 (on FTE basis)
- Grades: 10–12
- Enrollment: 480 (2023-2024)
- Student to teacher ratio: 9.94
- Education system: ADE Smart Core
- Classes offered: Regular (Core), Career Focus, Advanced Placement (AP)
- Colors: Orange and black
- Athletics conference: 4A Region 7
- Mascot: The Scrapper
- Team name: Nashville Scrappers
- Accreditation: ADE
- Newspaper: Scrapper Star
- Yearbook: The Scrapper
- Communities served: Nashville
- Website: www.nashvillesd.com/o/nhs

Nashville High School is a comprehensive public high school located in Nashville, Arkansas, United States. The school provides secondary education in grades 10 through 12 for students in the Nashville and the surrounding unincorporated communities of Howard County, Arkansas. It is one of three public high schools in Howard County and the only senior high school administered by the Nashville School District. Nashville Junior High School is its main feeder school.

== Academics ==
Nashville High School is a Title I school that is accredited by the ADE and has been accredited by AdvancED since 1961. The school has a partnership with UA Cossatot that offers training in various vocational, technical, and technology-based courses.

=== Curriculum ===
The assumed course of study follows the Smart Core curriculum developed by the Arkansas Department of Education (ADE), which requires students complete at least 22 units prior to graduation. Students may take Advanced Placement (AP) courses and exam with the opportunity to receive college credit.

== Athletics ==
The Nashville High School mascot is the Scrapper with orange and black serving as the school colors.

The Nashville Scrappers compete in interscholastic activities within Class 4A administered by the Arkansas Activities Association. The Scrappers play within the 4A-7 Conference. Nashville fields varsity teams in football, basketball (boys/girls), cheer, cross country (boys/girls), baseball, fastpitch softball, track and field (boys/girls), tennis (boys/girls), golf (boys/girls), and soccer (boys/girls). Nashville's athletic program is one of the most successful in Arkansas, having won 42 state championships.

=== Football ===
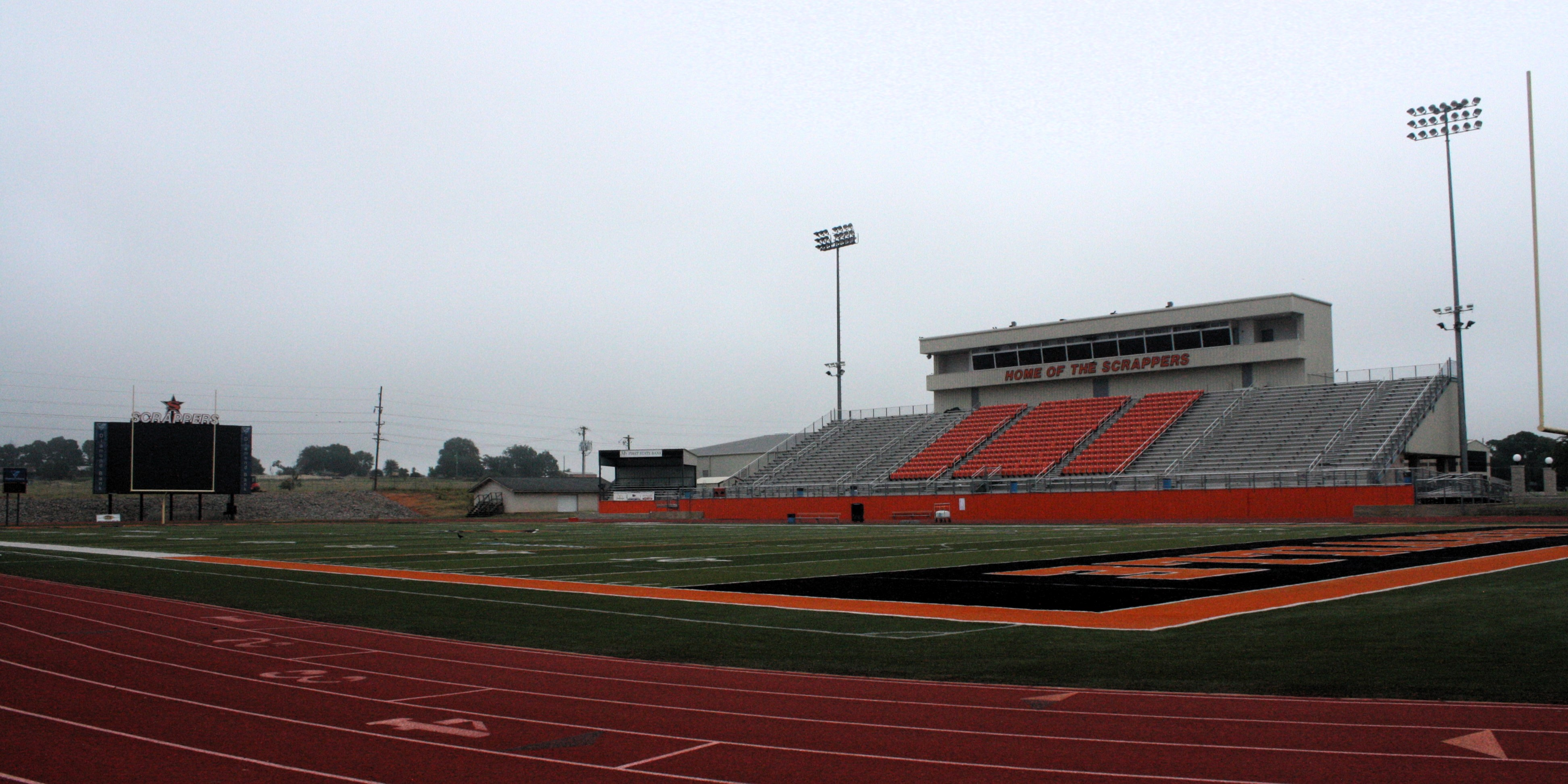
Scrapper Stadium on the campus of Nashville High School in Nashville, AR

The Nashville Scrappers football team is one of the top 30 winningest high school football programs in the country (3rd winningest in Arkansas), winning over 800 games since the program's creation in 1910. The Scrappers have won five state championships as recognized by the Arkansas Activities Association (1996, 2005, 2006, 2007, 2015), and claim four others as distinguished by statewide newspaper rankings in the pre-playoff era (1941, 1942, 1955, 1967). The Scrappers won three consecutive state championships (2005, 2006, 2007) and carried a 33-game winning streak from 2005-07. The record-setting 1996 championship football squad went 15-0, scored 97 touchdowns, 77 extra points, and gained 7,052 in total yards that season; receiver Greg Washington amassed a state-record 27 touchdowns and 2,321 yards.

In 2015, first-year head coach Mike Volarvich led the Scrappers to another state title, equaling the 1996 team by amassing a perfect 15-0 record, and breaking numerous school records.

=== Baseball and softball ===
The Scrappers baseball teams are one of the state's most successful with 29 state tournament appearances and four state championships (2007, 2017, 2018, 2019). The fastpitch softball team has won three state titles (2010, 2012, 2013) while the 1999 slowpitch softball team holds the state-record with 34 wins in a season. Slowpitch softball is no longer a sanctioned sport in Arkansas.

=== Track and field ===
The Scrappers girls track and field teams have distinguished themselves with 10 state championships (tied for the state's most successful team) including six consecutive titles (1999, 2000, 2001, 2003, 2007, 2008, 2009, 2010, 2011, 2012), while the boys track teams have won seven state titles between 1982 and 2010 including consecutive titles from 1999-2001.

=== Other sports ===
The Scrappers have experienced success in other sports as well. The boys golf team has won two state titles (1979 and 2004). The girls golf team won the 2018 state title. The girls tennis team won a state title in 2012. The cheer squad has won eight state titles (2003, 2004, 2005, 2006, 2008, 2013, 2016, and 2017).

== History ==
In 1883, Nashville became a town and continued to grow due to the Nashville expansion of a branch of the A & L Railroad in 1884. With such growth, the first public school system in Nashville was formed in the 1880s and a frame schoolhouse was built. The original schoolhouse remained in use until a fire destroyed the structure in 1931. A new school building was constructed in 1932. By the 1940s, Nashville High School needed a gymnasium to hold local sporting and entertainment events.

=== Garrett Whiteside Hall ===
- Garrett Whiteside Hall
- U.S. National Register of Historic Places
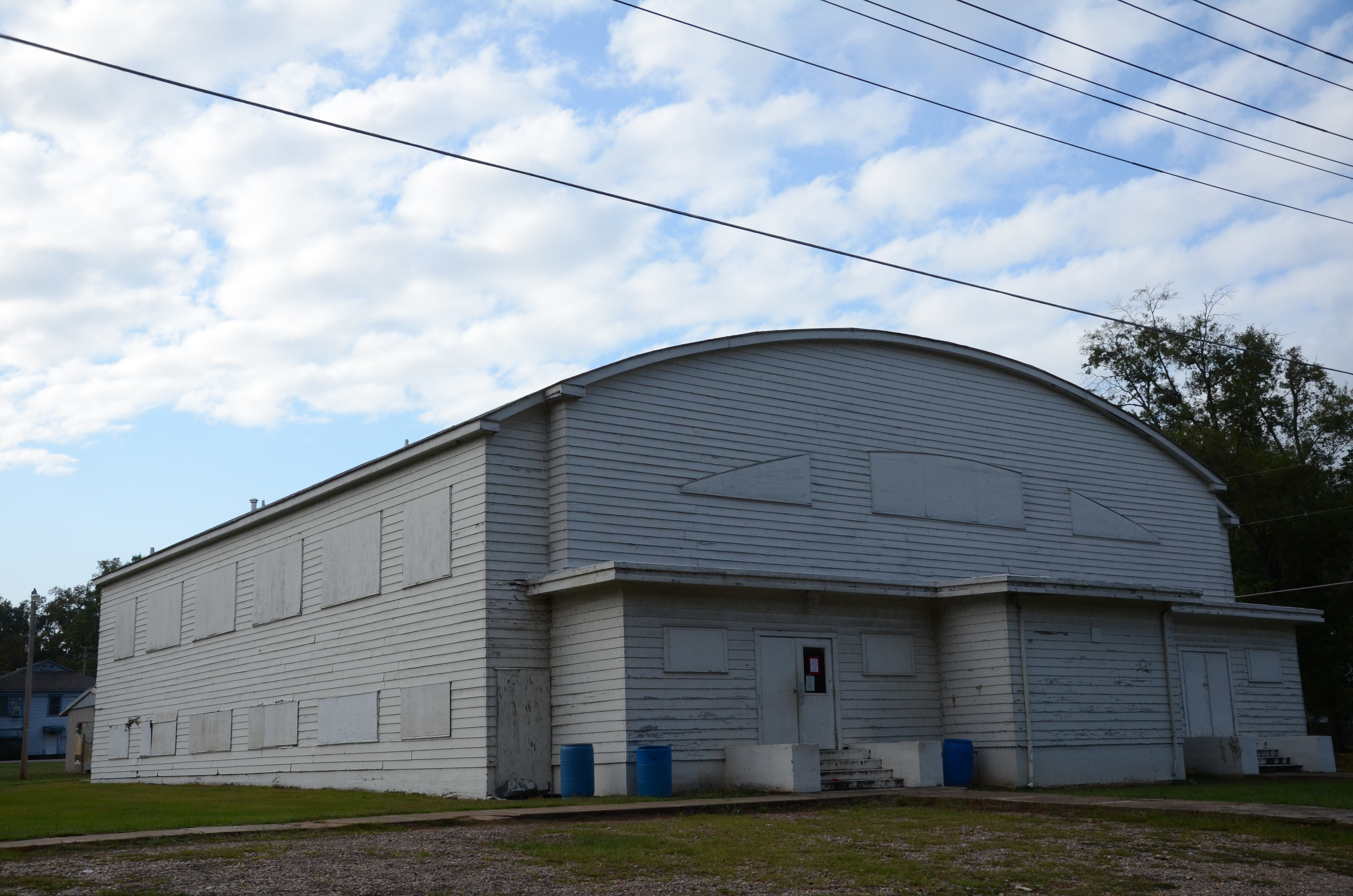

- Location within Arkansas Location within the United States
- Location: junction of North Third Ave., and Lockesburg St., SW corner, Nashville, Arkansas
- Coordinates: 33°57′1″N 93°50′59″W
- Area: less than one acre
- Built: 1940
- Architectural style: 20th-Century Plain
- NRHP reference No.: 94001340
- Added to NRHP: November 21, 1994

In 1940, the Garrett Whiteside Hall gymnasium was built by the National Youth Administration (NYA) and remains as the last school building of this period to survive in Nashville. The gymnasium is a representative example of the restrained, functional architectural style preferred by public works agencies during the Great Depression. Constructed using locally available building material and exhibiting symmetrical massing and composition, the inclusion of a unique rounded roof makes the structure distinctive. The structure is so named for Nashville-native Garrett Whiteside, who served as secretary for multiple congressman and senators from Arkansas.

When completed in the fall for the 1940–41 school year, the Garrett Whiteside Hall gymnasium had a seating capacity of 800 for basketball games and over 2,000 people could attend school plays and graduations using floor seating. Since the construction of the new high school and gymnasium, Garrett Whiteside Hall continues to serve as a practice gym for the school district.

== See also ==
- National Register of Historic Places listings in Howard County, Arkansas
