= Sidney, Arkansas =

- Town
- Location of Sidney in Sharp County, Arkansas.
- Coordinates: 36°0′16″N 91°39′33″W
- Country: United States
- State: Arkansas
- County: Sharp

Area
  - Total: 2.08 sq mi (5.40 km^{2})
  - Land: 2.08 sq mi (5.40 km^{2})
  - Water: 0 sq mi (0.00 km^{2})
- Elevation: 646 ft (197 m)

Population (2020)
  - Total: 192
  - Estimate (2025): 203 ▲
  - Density: 92.0/sq mi (35.53/km^{2})
- Time zone: UTC-6 (Central (CST))
  - Summer (DST): UTC-5 (CDT)
- ZIP code: 72577
- Area code: 870
- FIPS code: 05-64280
- GNIS feature ID: 2407333

Sidney is a town in Sharp County, Arkansas, United States. As of the 2020 census, Sidney had a population of 192.

== Geography ==
Sidney is located at 36°0′16″N 91°39′33″W (36.004326, -91.659115).

According to the United States Census Bureau, the town has a total area of 2.2 square miles (5.7 km^{2}), all land.

== Demographics ==
Historical population
Census	Pop.	Note	%±
1940	153		—
1950	120		−21.6%
1960	97		−19.2%
1970	109		12.4%
1980	270		147.7%
1990	271		0.4%
2000	275		1.5%
2010	181		−34.2%
2020	192		6.1%
2025 (est.)	203	▲	5.7%
U.S. Decennial Census

As of the census of 2000, there were 275 people, 80 households, and 58 families residing in the town. The population density was 126.4 inhabitants per square mile (48.8/km^{2}). There were 94 housing units at an average density of 43.2 per square mile (16.7/km^{2}). The racial makeup of the town was 97.09% White, 1.09% Native American, and 1.82% from two or more races. 0.73% of the population were Hispanic or Latino of any race.

There were 80 households, out of which 32.5% had children under the age of 18 living with them, 57.5% were married couples living together, 10.0% had a female householder with no husband present, and 27.5% were non-families. 26.3% of all households were made up of individuals, and 13.8% had someone living alone who was 65 years of age or older. The average household size was 2.61 and the average family size was 3.05.

In the town, the population was spread out, with 21.5% under the age of 18, 6.9% from 18 to 24, 20.4% from 25 to 44, 18.2% from 45 to 64, and 33.1% who were 65 years of age or older. The median age was 46 years. For every 100 females, there were 66.7 males. For every 100 females age 18 and over, there were 66.2 males.

The median income for a household in the town was $22,000, and the median income for a family was $23,125. Males had a median income of $19,375 versus $12,361 for females. The per capita income for the town was $8,926. About 2.0% of families and 11.0% of the population were below the poverty line, including 7.7% of those under the age of eighteen and 14.8% of those 65 or over.

== Education ==
It is in the Evening Shade School District.
