= Pottsville School District =

School district in Arkansas, United States

Pottsville Schools (or Pottsville School District No. 61) is a public school district in Pottsville, Arkansas. The Board of Education, a five (5) member group, is the level of government which has responsibilities over all activities related to public elementary and secondary school education within the jurisdiction of the Pottsville School District.

== Schools ==
- Pottsville High School
- Pottsville Junior High School
- Pottsville Middle Grades
- Pottsville Elementary School

== See also ==
- List of school districts in Arkansas
