= Harrison School District (Arkansas) =

School district in Arkansas, United States

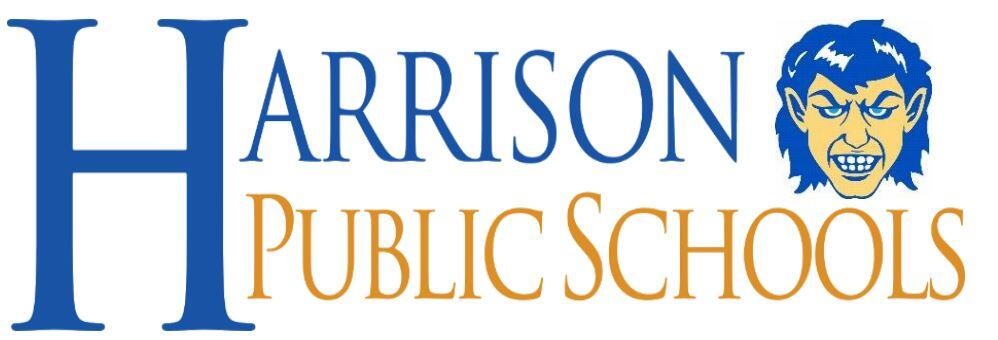

Location
- 110 South Cherry Street; Harrison, Arkansas 72601 United States
- Coordinates: 36°13′46″N 93°06′46″W

District information
- Type: Public
- Grades: K–12
- Superintendent: Stewart Pratt
- Budget: $21.6 million (2010-2011 academic year)

Students and staff
- Enrollment: 2,788 (2009-2010 academic year)
- Student–teacher ratio: 13.87 (2009-2010 academic year)
- District mascot: Golden Goblins
- Colors: Blue and Gold

Other information
- Newspaper: Goblin Noise
- Website: harrisongoblins.org

Harrison School District No. 1 is a public school district in Boone County, Arkansas, United States which serves the city of Harrison along with other unincorporated areas within the county. The Harrison School District serves one large contiguous area and a smaller non-contiguous area in the southeast portion of the county. It also includes a section of Newton County.

== Schools ==
- Harrison High School
- Harrison Middle School
- Forest Heights Elementary School
- Skyline Heights Elementary School
- Harrison Alternative School

=== Harrison Senior High School ===
Harrison Senior High School serves ninth through twelfth grades throughout the Harrison School District. Based on the 2009–2010 academic year, the total enrollment in the school was 598 and total full-time teachers was 48.40, with a teacher/student ratio of 12.36.

=== Harrison Middle School ===
Harrison Middle School serves fifth, sixth, seventh, and eighth grades throughout the Harrison School District. Based on the 2009–2010 academic year, the total enrollment in the school was 425 and total full-time teachers was 24.70, with a teacher/student ratio of 17.21. The Harrison Middle School was dedicated in February 2005.

=== Forest Heights Elementary School ===
Forest Heights Elementary School serves kindergarten through fourth grade. Based on the 2009–2010 academic year, the total enrollment in the school was 366 and total full-time teachers was 21.90, with a teacher/student ratio of 16.71. In mid-2011, an addition was completed at Forest Heights Elementary School as part of a $5 million facilities project which included other elementary schools in the district. In 2011, the school was nationally recognized as a National Blue Ribbon School by the U.S. Department of Education.

=== Skyline Heights Elementary School ===
Skyline Heights Elementary School serves kindergarten through fourth grade. Based on the 2009–2010 academic year, the total enrollment in the school was 415 and total full-time teachers was 25.60, with a teacher/student ratio of 16.21.

== Board of education ==
The Harrison School District Board of Education is composed of seven elected members. Elections are staggered. Regular meetings are held monthly. Parents and other members of the public may listen but may not speak or ask any questions during Harrison School Board of Education meetings.

== Staffing ==
Based on the 2009–2010 academic year, the total full-time staff of the Harrison School District was 433. The total full-time teachers was 201. The total number of non-teaching staff (including 9 administrators) was 232.

== History ==
In 1980 the Newton County School District dissolved, with a portion going to the Harrison district.

Preschool began to be developed in the Harrison School District in 2006.

On February 25, 2010, the Harrison School District Board of Education announced the appointment of Dr. Melinda Moss as superintendent, effective July 1, 2010. She served as assistant superintendent and was selected out of four finalists.

== Demographics ==
Within the geographic area covered by the Harrison School District, there were 4,624 individuals under the age of 18 during the 2009–2010 academic year. In 2019, the total population was 20,576. The median household income was $43,240. 93% of the population were White, 0% were Black, 3% were Hispanic or Latino, 1% were Asian, 1% were American Indian or Alaskan native, and 3% were of two or more races.

== See also ==
- List of school districts in Arkansas
