= Nashville School District =

School district in Arkansas

Location
- 600 North 4th Street; Nashville, Arkansas 71852 United States

District information
- Type: Public
- Grades: KG–12
- Established: 1907
- Accreditation: Arkansas Department of Education
- Schools: 4
- NCES District ID: 0511880

Students and staff
- Students: 2,090
- Teachers: 147.52 (on FTE basis)
- Student–teacher ratio: 14.17
- District mascot: Scrappers
- Colors: Orange Black

Other information
- Federal Funding: Title I A Title II A Title VI (REAP)
- Website: www.nashvillesd.com

Nashville School District is an accredited public school district providing comprehensive early childhood, elementary and secondary education to students in and around the rural, distant Howard County community of Nashville, Arkansas, United States.

In 1966 the Childress School District merged into the Nashville School District.

The district extends into Hempstead County, and into Pike County.

== Schools ==
- Nashville High School—provides secondary education in grades 10 through 12.
- Nashville Junior High School—provides secondary education in grades 7 through 9.
- Nashville Primary School—provides elementary education in grades 4 through 6.
- Nashville Primary School—provides elementary education in prekindergarten through grade 3.
