= Clarksville School District =

School district in Arkansas, United States

Address
- 1701 Clark Road Clarksville, Arkansas, 72830; United States

District information
- Type: Public
- Grades: K–12
- NCES District ID: 0504380

Students and staff
- Students: 2,436
- Teachers: 173.15
- Staff: 211.29
- Student–teacher ratio: 14.07

Other information
- Website: www.csdar.org

Clarksville School District 17 is a school district in Johnson County, Arkansas.

== Schools ==
The District includes:

- Clarksville Primary School
- Clarksville Elementary School
- Clarksville Intermediate School
- Clarksville Middle School
- Clarksville Junior High School
- Clarksville High School
