= Highland High School (Arkansas) =

Location
- 1 Rebel Circle; Highland, Arkansas 72542; United States; 36°15′45″N 91°31′51″W

Information
- School type: Public comprehensive
- Established: August 1964 (62 years ago)
- Status: Open
- School district: Highland School District
- NCES School ID: 050777000491
- Dean: Jared Richey
- Teaching staff: 59.01 (on FTE basis)
- Grades: 9–12
- Enrollment: 515 (2023–2024)
- Student to teacher ratio: 8.73
- Education system: ADE Smart Core
- Classes offered: Regular, Advanced Placement (AP)
- Colors: Red and gray
- Athletics: Football, Volleyball, Bowling, Golf, Basketball, Tennis, Baseball, Softball, Track, Cheer
- Athletics conference: 4A Region 3
- Mascot: Rebel
- Team name: Highland Rebels
- Accreditation: ADE; AdvancED (1975–)
- Website: www.highlandrebels.k12.ar.us/o/district/page/contact-information-high-school

Highland High School (HHS) is an accredited comprehensive public high school located in the town of Highland, Arkansas, United States, located south of Hardy. The school provides secondary education for students in grades 8 through 12. It is one of two public high schools in Sharp County, Arkansas and the sole high school administered by the Highland School District.

== Academics ==
Established in August 1964 with its first graduating class in May 1965, Highland High School is accredited by the Arkansas Department of Education (ADE) and has been accredited by AdvancED since 1975. The assumed course of study follows the Smart Core curriculum developed by the ADE. Students complete regular (core and elective) and career focus coursework and exams and may take Advanced Placement (AP) courses and exams with the opportunity to receive college credit.

== Extracurricular activities ==
The Highland High School mascot and athletic emblem is the Rebel with red and gray serving as the school colors. Significant efforts toward changing the mascot, which is perceived by many to carry racist connotations, have been largely unsuccessful. Though the school has recently removed most representations of the confederate flag and the playing of the song "Dixie" at sporting events, the Rebel mascot, adopted in the wake of desegregation and the Civil Rights Movement, remains despite considerable public sentiment from within and beyond the local community that it should be discontinued.

=== Athletics ===
The Highland Rebels compete in interscholastic activities within the 4A Classification via the 4A Region 3 Conference, as administered by the Arkansas Activities Association. The Rebels participate in football, bowling (boys/girls), golf (boys/girls), basketball (boys/girls), cheer, competitive cheer, baseball, softball, and track and field (boys/girls).

Football games are played at the school's Rebel Memorial Stadium.

== Notable alumni ==
- Phillip Sweet - singer and guitarist for Little Big Town
