= Highland School District (Arkansas) =

School district in Arkansas, United States

Location
- 1627 Hwy 62/412; Highland, Arkansas 72542 North-central Arkansas United States

District information
- Motto: Tradition · Pride · Excellence
- Grades: K–12
- Established: 1962
- Superintendent: Don Sharp
- Schools: 3
- NCES District ID: 0507770

Students and staff
- Students: 1,681
- Teachers: 117.05 (on FTE basis)
- Staff: 236.05 (on FTE basis)
- Student–teacher ratio: 13.89
- Athletic conference: 4A Region 3
- District mascot: Rebels
- Colors: Red; Gray

Other information
- Website: highlandrebels.k12.ar.us

Highland School District is a public school district based in Highland, Arkansas, United States. The school district encompasses 325 square miles (840 km^{2}) of land including portions of Sharp County and Fulton County communities including Hardy, Highland, Ash Flat, Horseshoe Bend, Williford, and Cherokee Village.

The district proves comprehensive education for kindergarten through grade 12 is accredited by the Arkansas Department of Education (ADE).

== History ==
The district was established in 1962 as a result of consolidating the former Ash Flat and Hardy school districts.

On July 1, 2010, the Twin Rivers School District was dissolved. A portion of the district was given to the Highland district.

== Schools ==
- Highland High School, serving more than 500 students in grades 9 through 12.
- Highland Middle School, serving approximately 500 students in grades 5 through 8.
- Chereokee Elementary School, serving approximately 600 students in kindergarten through grade 4.
