= 1960 United States presidential election in Arkansas =

- November 8, 1960

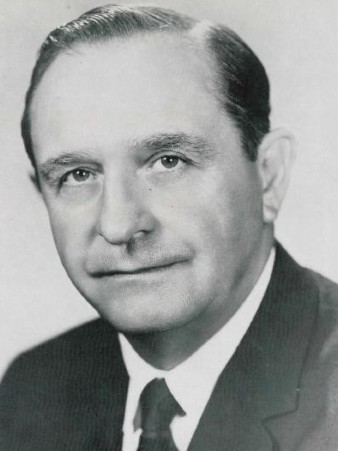
Nominee	John F. Kennedy	Richard Nixon	Orval Faubus
Party	Democratic	Republican	National States' Rights
Home state	Massachusetts	California	Arkansas
Running mate	Lyndon B. Johnson	Henry Cabot Lodge Jr.	John G. Crommelin
Electoral vote	8	0	0
Popular vote	215,049	184,508	28,952
Percentage	50.19%	43.06%	6.76%

Kennedy
40–50%
50–60%
60–70%
70–80%
Nixon
40–50%
50–60%
60–70%
President before election
Dwight D. Eisenhower
Republican
Elected President
John F. Kennedy
Democratic

The 1960 United States presidential election in Arkansas took place on November 8, 1960, as part of the 1960 United States presidential election. State voters chose eight representatives, or electors, to the Electoral College, who voted for president and vice president.

Arkansas was won by Senator John F. Kennedy (D–Massachusetts), running with Senator Lyndon B. Johnson, with 50.19% of the popular vote against incumbent Vice President Richard Nixon (R–California), running with former United States Ambassador to the United Nations Henry Cabot Lodge Jr., with 43.06% of the popular vote. National States' Rights Party candidate Orval Faubus performed best in his home state of Arkansas, earning 6.76% of the vote. Nixon was however the first-ever Republican victor in the five northeastern counties of Clay, Craighead, Fulton, Randolph and Sharp due to powerful "Bible Belt" anti-Catholicism. In 1928 this was muted by the presence of Arkansas Senator Joseph T. Robinson as Al Smith's running mate, and perhaps by perception of Hoover's ineffectiveness at relieving the great 1927 flood.

Nixon was also the first Republican victor in Marion County since Ulysses S. Grant in 1868. As of the 2020 presidential election, this is the last time Democratic candidates simultaneously won the presidential election and the state's Class 2 senate seat.

== Results ==
1960 United States presidential election in Arkansas
Party	Candidate	Votes	%
Democratic	John F. Kennedy	215,049	50.19%
Republican	Richard Nixon	184,508	43.06%
National States' Rights Party	Orval Faubus	28,952	6.76%
Total votes		428,509	100%

=== Results by county ===
County	John F. Kennedy Democratic		Richard Nixon Republican		Orval Faubus National States' Rights		Margin		Total votes cast
County	#	%	#	%	#	%	#	%	Total votes cast
Arkansas	2,789	52.44%	2,043	38.42%	486	9.14%	746	14.02%	5,318
Ashley	3,118	62.04%	1,288	25.63%	620	12.34%	1,830	36.41%	5,026
Baxter	1,694	43.67%	2,108	54.34%	77	1.99%	-414	-10.67%	3,879
Benton	3,619	31.23%	7,832	67.58%	139	1.20%	-4,213	-36.35%	11,590
Boone	2,774	44.51%	3,388	54.36%	71	1.14%	-614	-9.85%	6,233
Bradley	2,960	70.31%	873	20.74%	377	8.95%	2,087	49.57%	4,210
Calhoun	1,151	72.03%	295	18.46%	152	9.51%	856	53.57%	1,598
Carroll	1,301	32.81%	2,615	65.95%	49	1.24%	-1,314	-33.14%	3,965
Chicot	1,803	59.10%	979	32.09%	269	8.82%	824	27.01%	3,051
Clark	3,295	64.82%	1,357	26.70%	431	8.48%	1,938	38.12%	5,083
Clay	1,908	41.77%	2,543	55.67%	117	2.56%	-635	-13.90%	4,568
Cleburne	1,144	50.13%	1,026	44.96%	112	4.91%	118	5.17%	2,282
Cleveland	1,216	70.90%	290	16.91%	209	12.19%	926	53.99%	1,715
Columbia	2,427	43.30%	2,372	42.32%	806	14.38%	55	0.98%	5,605
Conway	2,900	60.47%	1,685	35.13%	211	4.40%	1,215	25.34%	4,796
Craighead	4,898	45.61%	5,258	48.97%	582	5.42%	-360	-3.36%	10,738
Crawford	2,430	41.14%	3,373	57.10%	104	1.76%	-943	-15.96%	5,907
Crittenden	2,679	52.24%	2,234	43.56%	215	4.19%	445	8.68%	5,128
Cross	2,088	57.76%	1,287	35.60%	240	6.64%	801	22.16%	3,615
Dallas	1,639	62.68%	659	25.20%	317	12.12%	980	37.48%	2,615
Desha	2,502	63.57%	1,063	27.01%	371	9.43%	1,439	36.56%	3,936
Drew	2,107	62.49%	889	26.36%	376	11.15%	1,218	36.13%	3,372
Faulkner	3,820	57.80%	2,426	36.71%	363	5.49%	1,394	21.09%	6,609
Franklin	2,025	53.99%	1,631	43.48%	95	2.53%	394	10.51%	3,751
Fulton	703	38.02%	1,127	60.95%	19	1.03%	-424	-22.93%	1,849
Garland	6,333	45.42%	7,204	51.66%	407	2.92%	-871	-6.24%	13,944
Grant	1,394	61.44%	563	24.81%	312	13.75%	831	36.63%	2,269
Greene	2,774	49.81%	2,658	47.73%	137	2.46%	116	2.08%	5,569
Hempstead	2,596	54.55%	1,948	40.93%	215	4.52%	648	13.62%	4,759
Hot Spring	3,454	59.00%	1,732	29.59%	668	11.41%	1,722	29.41%	5,854
Howard	1,366	49.95%	1,225	44.79%	144	5.27%	141	5.16%	2,735
Independence	2,487	47.02%	2,639	49.90%	163	3.08%	-152	-2.88%	5,289
Izard	1,340	59.61%	808	35.94%	100	4.45%	532	23.67%	2,248
Jackson	2,860	55.44%	1,986	38.50%	313	6.07%	874	16.94%	5,159
Jefferson	8,442	55.41%	4,839	31.76%	1,954	12.83%	3,603	23.65%	15,235
Johnson	1,938	55.01%	1,490	42.29%	95	2.70%	448	12.72%	3,523
Lafayette	1,286	55.31%	713	30.67%	326	14.02%	573	24.64%	2,325
Lawrence	2,074	51.02%	1,800	44.28%	191	4.70%	274	6.74%	4,065
Lee	1,409	52.17%	1,034	38.28%	258	9.55%	375	13.89%	2,701
Lincoln	1,780	67.27%	626	23.66%	240	9.07%	1,154	43.61%	2,646
Little River	1,514	65.17%	692	29.79%	117	5.04%	822	35.38%	2,323
Logan	2,636	55.33%	2,014	42.28%	114	2.39%	622	13.05%	4,764
Lonoke	2,991	55.93%	1,560	29.17%	797	14.90%	1,431	26.76%	5,348
Madison	1,702	40.51%	2,445	58.20%	54	1.29%	-743	-17.69%	4,201
Marion	968	48.21%	1,016	50.60%	24	1.20%	-48	-2.39%	2,008
Miller	4,550	56.06%	3,113	38.35%	454	5.59%	1,437	17.71%	8,117
Mississippi	5,138	48.54%	4,983	47.08%	464	4.38%	155	1.46%	10,585
Monroe	1,856	60.50%	833	27.15%	379	12.35%	1,023	33.35%	3,068
Montgomery	788	46.99%	836	49.85%	53	3.16%	-48	-2.86%	1,677
Nevada	1,605	58.34%	937	34.06%	209	7.60%	668	24.28%	2,751
Newton	844	31.41%	1,814	67.51%	29	1.08%	-970	-36.10%	2,687
Ouachita	5,169	63.10%	2,439	29.77%	584	7.13%	2,730	33.33%	8,192
Perry	789	56.97%	501	36.17%	95	6.86%	288	20.80%	1,385
Phillips	4,105	61.48%	2,168	32.47%	404	6.05%	1,937	29.01%	6,677
Pike	997	47.43%	1,013	48.19%	92	4.38%	-16	-0.76%	2,102
Poinsett	2,817	51.75%	2,430	44.64%	197	3.62%	387	7.11%	5,444
Polk	1,635	45.02%	1,882	51.82%	115	3.17%	-247	-6.80%	3,632
Pope	2,760	49.38%	2,573	46.04%	256	4.58%	187	3.34%	5,589
Prairie	1,680	63.73%	734	27.85%	222	8.42%	946	35.88%	2,636
Pulaski	26,034	46.67%	22,146	39.70%	7,608	13.64%	3,888	6.97%	55,788
Randolph	1,556	47.47%	1,620	49.42%	102	3.11%	-64	-1.95%	3,278
St. Francis	2,432	53.83%	1,786	39.53%	300	6.64%	646	14.30%	4,518
Saline	3,898	57.40%	2,195	32.32%	698	10.28%	1,703	25.08%	6,791
Scott	1,116	49.29%	1,137	50.22%	11	0.49%	-21	-0.93%	2,264
Searcy	1,022	30.50%	2,297	68.55%	32	0.95%	-1,275	-38.05%	3,351
Sebastian	8,726	42.16%	11,744	56.75%	226	1.09%	-3,018	-14.59%	20,696
Sevier	1,580	55.73%	1,141	40.25%	114	4.02%	439	15.48%	2,835
Sharp	807	45.18%	911	51.01%	68	3.81%	-104	-5.83%	1,786
Stone	897	46.17%	959	49.36%	87	4.48%	-62	-3.19%	1,943
Union	6,500	47.92%	5,631	41.51%	1,434	10.57%	869	6.41%	13,565
Van Buren	1,158	51.08%	1,009	44.51%	100	4.41%	149	6.57%	2,267
Washington	5,391	34.38%	10,088	64.34%	200	1.28%	-4,697	-29.96%	15,679
White	5,244	53.33%	3,985	40.52%	605	6.15%	1,259	12.81%	9,834
Woodruff	1,613	63.63%	667	26.31%	255	10.06%	946	37.32%	2,535
Yell	2,008	58.49%	1,303	37.96%	122	3.55%	705	20.53%	3,433
Totals	215,049	50.19%	184,508	43.06%	28,952	6.76%	30,541	7.13%	428,509

==== Counties that flipped from Democratic to Republican ====
- Clay
- Craighead
- Fulton
- Marion
- Pike
- Randolph
- Sharp
- Stone

==== Counties that flipped from Republican to Democratic ====
- Arkansas
- Crittenden
- Pulaski

== See also ==
- United States presidential elections in Arkansas
