= Sloan–Hendrix High School =

Location
- 1 Greyhound Circle; Imboden, Arkansas 72434; United States; 36°12′04″N 91°11′14″W

Information
- Type: Public high school
- Motto: Preserving Yesterday, Excelling Today, Preparing for Tomorrow
- School district: Sloan–Hendrix School District
- NCES School ID: 051248001007
- Principal: Melanie Spence
- Teaching staff: 47.55 (on an FTE basis)
- Grades: 8–12
- Enrollment: 353 (2023-2024)
- Student to teacher ratio: 7.42
- Colors: Black and gold
- Athletics conference: 2A 3 (2012-14)
- Mascot: Greyhound
- USNWR ranking: 10th (AR), 1537th (USA)
- Newspaper: The Greyhound
- Yearbook: The Academian
- Website: www.sloan-hendrix.com

Sloan–Hendrix High School is a public high school in Imboden, Arkansas, United States. It is part of the Sloan–Hendrix School District.

== Academics ==
The assumed course of study is the Smart Core curriculum developed by the Arkansas Department of Education (ADE). Students complete regular (core and career focus) courses and exams and may select Advanced Placement coursework and exams, which provide an opportunity to receive college credit prior to high school graduation. The school is accredited by the ADE and has been accredited by AdvancED since 1991.

== Extracurricular activities ==
The Sloan–Hendrix High School mascot is the greyhound, with black and gold serving as its school colors. For 2012–14, the Sloan-Hendrix Greyhounds compete in the 2A 2 Conference under the administration of the Arkansas Activities Association (AAA). Interscholastic activities include archery, band, baseball, basketball (boys/girls), bowling (boys/girls), choir, color guard, cross country (boys/girls), golf (boys/girls), softball, track (boys/girls), and trap shooting.

== Notable alumni ==
- Alan Belcher, professional mixed martial artist
