= Cutter–Morning Star School District =

School district in Arkansas, United States

Address
- 2801 Spring Street Hot Springs, Arkansas, 71901; United States

District information
- Type: Public
- Grades: PreK–12
- NCES District ID: 0504860

Students and staff
- Students: 650
- Teachers: 59.79
- Staff: 24.28
- Student–teacher ratio: 10.87

Other information
- Website: eaglesnest.dsc.k12.ar.us

Cutter–Morning Star School District 21 is a school district in Garland County, Arkansas.

It includes a portion of Hot Springs.

== Schools ==
- Cutter–Morning Star Elementary School
- Cutter–Morning Star High School
