= Mammoth Spring School District =

School district in Arkansas, United States

Address
- 410 Goldsmith Avenue Mammoth Spring, Arkansas, 72554; United States

District information
- Type: Public
- Grades: PreK–12
- NCES District ID: 0509270

Students and staff
- Students: 505
- Teachers: 62.98
- Staff: 35.6
- Student–teacher ratio: 8.02

Other information
- Website: www.mammothspringschools.com

Mammoth Spring School District is a school district in Mammoth Spring, Fulton County, Arkansas, United States.

== History ==
On July 1, 2010, the Twin Rivers School District was dissolved. A portion of the district was given to the Mammoth Spring district.

== Schools ==
- Mammoth Spring High School, serving grades 7 through 12.
- Mammoth Spring Elementary School, serving prekindergarten through grade 6.
