= Pocahontas School District =

School district in Arkansas, United States

Location
- 2300 North Park Street; Pocahontas, Arkansas 72455 United States

District information
- Grades: PK–12
- Established: 1879
- Accreditations: ADE; AdvancED (2009–)
- Schools: 4
- NCES District ID: 0511610

Students and staff
- Students: 1,856
- Teachers: 131.24 (on FTE basis)
- Staff: 275.24 (on FTE basis)
- Student–teacher ratio: 14.14
- Athletic conference: 4A Region 3 (2012–14)
- District mascot: Redskins
- Colors: Red White

Other information
- Website: www.pocahontaspsd.com

Pocahontas School District is a public school district based in Pocahontas, Arkansas, United States. The Pocahontas School District provides early childhood, elementary and secondary education for more than 2,000 pre-kindergarten through grade 12 students. Students are from 165.38 square miles (428.3 km^{2}) of land, encompassing Randolph County communities including all of Pocahontas. Pocahontas School District is accredited by the Arkansas Department of Education (ADE) and by AdvancED since 2009.

== History ==
On July 1, 2010, the Twin Rivers School District was dissolved. A portion of the district was given to the Pocahontas district.

== Schools ==
- Pocahontas High School—serving approximately 400 students in grades 10 through 12.
- Pocahontas Junior High School—serving more than 400 students in grades 7 through 9.
- M. D. Williams Intermediate School—serving approximately 550 students in grades 3 through 6.
- Alma Spikes Elementary School—serving approximately 450 students in pre-kindergarten through grade 2.

Prior to August 26, 1957, the district sent, via contract, high school-aged African-American children to Booker T. Washington High School in Jonesboro, Arkansas, which was operated by the Jonesboro School District. On that day the Jonesboro district's board of trustees ended the contract.
