= Sharp County, Arkansas =

County in Arkansas, United States

- County
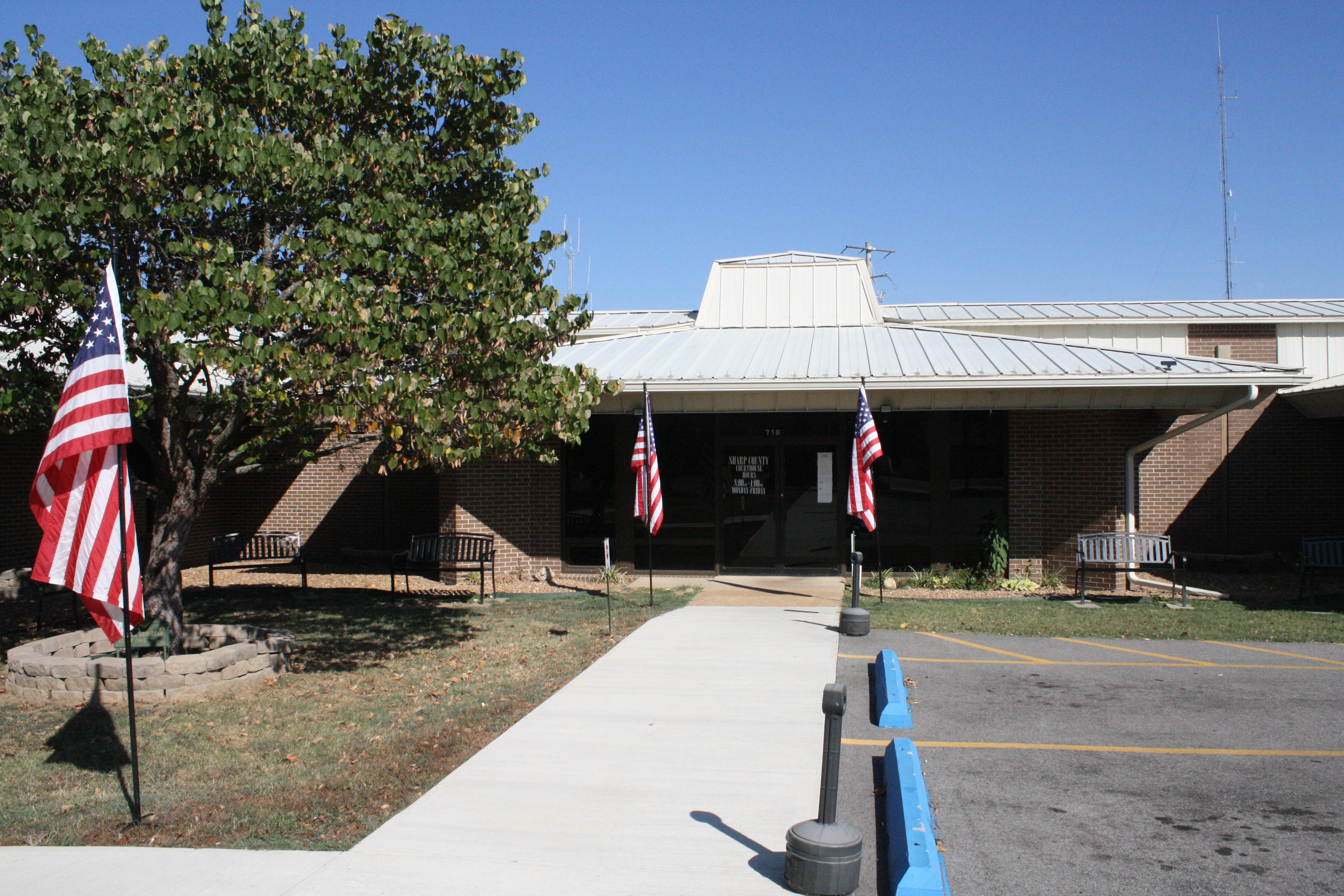
- Sharp County Courthouse in Ash Flat

- Location within the U.S. state of Arkansas
- Coordinates: 36°09′21″N 91°30′18″W
- Country: United States
- State: Arkansas
- Founded: July 18, 1868
- Named for: Ephraim Sharp
- Seat: Ash Flat
- Largest city: Cherokee Village

Area
  - Total: 606 sq mi (1,570 km^{2})
  - Land: 604 sq mi (1,560 km^{2})
  - Water: 2.0 sq mi (5.2 km^{2}) 0.3%

Population (2020)
  - Total: 17,271
  - Estimate (2025): 18,122 ▲
  - Density: 28.6/sq mi (11.0/km^{2})
- Time zone: UTC−6 (Central)
  - Summer (DST): UTC−5 (CDT)
- Congressional district: 1st
- Website: sharpcountyar.com

Sharp County is a county located in the U.S. state of Arkansas. As of the 2020 census, the population was 17,271. The county seat is Ash Flat. The county was formed on July 18, 1868, and named for Ephraim Sharp, a state legislator from the area.

== Geography ==
According to the U.S. Census Bureau, the county has a total area of 606 square miles (1,570 km^{2}), of which 604 square miles (1,560 km^{2}) is land and 2.0 square miles (5.2 km^{2}) (0.3%) is water.

=== Major highways ===
- U.S. Highway 62 / U.S. Highway 412
- U.S. Highway 63
- U.S. Highway 167
- Highway 56
- Highway 58
- Highway 115
- Highway 175
- Highway 230
- Highway 342

=== Adjacent counties ===
- Oregon County, Missouri (north)
- Randolph County (northeast)
- Lawrence County (southeast)
- Independence County (south)
- Izard County (southwest)
- Fulton County (northwest)

== Demographics ==
Historical population
Census	Pop.	Note	%±
1870	5,400		—
1880	9,047		67.5%
1890	10,418		15.2%
1900	12,199		17.1%
1910	11,688		−4.2%
1920	11,132		−4.8%
1930	10,715		−3.7%
1940	11,497		7.3%
1950	8,999		−21.7%
1960	6,319		−29.8%
1970	8,233		30.3%
1980	14,607		77.4%
1990	14,109		−3.4%
2000	17,119		21.3%
2010	17,264		0.8%
2020	17,271		0.0%
2025 (est.)	18,122	▲	4.9%
U.S. Decennial Census; 1790–1960 1900–1990; 1990–2000 2010

=== 2020 census ===
As of the 2020 census, the county had a population of 17,271. The median age was 48.4 years. 20.5% of residents were under the age of 18 and 26.0% of residents were 65 years of age or older. For every 100 females there were 97.4 males, and for every 100 females age 18 and over there were 95.5 males age 18 and over.

Sharp County racial composition
Race	Percentage
White	91.9%
Black or African American	0.7%
American Indian and Alaska Native	0.7%
Asian	0.3%
Native Hawaiian and Pacific Islander	0.1%
Some other race	0.8%
Two or more races	5.4%
Hispanic or Latino (of any race)	2.1%

<0.1% of residents lived in urban areas, while 100.0% lived in rural areas.

There were 7,356 households in the county, of which 25.0% had children under the age of 18 living in them. Of all households, 47.8% were married-couple households, 19.3% were households with a male householder and no spouse or partner present, and 26.9% were households with a female householder and no spouse or partner present. About 30.8% of all households were made up of individuals and 16.4% had someone living alone who was 65 years of age or older.

There were 9,499 housing units, of which 22.6% were vacant. Among occupied housing units, 76.3% were owner-occupied and 23.7% were renter-occupied. The homeowner vacancy rate was 3.7% and the rental vacancy rate was 8.3%.

=== 2000 census ===
As of the 2000 census, there were 17,119 people, 7,211 households, and 5,141 families residing in the county. The population density was 28 people per square mile (11 people/km^{2}). There were 9,342 housing units at an average density of 16 units per square mile (6.2 units/km^{2}). The racial makeup of the county was 97.14% White, 0.49% Black or African American, 0.68% Native American, 0.12% Asian, 0.02% Pacific Islander, 0.16% from other races, and 1.39% from two or more races. 0.98% of the population were Hispanic or Latino of any race.

There were 7,211 households, out of which 25.80% had children under the age of 18 living with them, 59.90% were married couples living together, 8.10% had a female householder with no husband present, and 28.70% were non-families. 25.60% of all households were made up of individuals, and 14.40% had someone living alone who was 65 years of age or older. The average household size was 2.34 and the average family size was 2.79.

In the county, the population was spread out, with 21.90% under the age of 18, 6.30% from 18 to 24, 22.80% from 25 to 44, 25.50% from 45 to 64, and 23.60% who were 65 years of age or older. The median age was 44 years. For every 100 females there were 92.40 males. For every 100 females age 18 and over, there were 90.20 males.

The median income for a household in the county was $25,152, and the median income for a family was $29,691. Males had a median income of $23,329 versus $16,884 for females. The per capita income for the county was $14,143. About 13.20% of families and 18.20% of the population were below the poverty line, including 25.40% of those under age 18 and 13.20% of those age 65 or over.

== Government ==
=== Government ===
The county government is a constitutional body granted specific powers by the Constitution of Arkansas and the Arkansas Code. The quorum court is the legislative branch of the county government and controls all spending and revenue collection. Representatives are called justices of the peace and are elected from county districts every even-numbered year. The number of districts in a county vary from nine to fifteen, and district boundaries are drawn by the county election commission. The Sharp County Quorum Court has nine members. Presiding over quorum court meetings is the county judge, who serves as the chief executive officer of the county. The county judge is elected at-large and does not vote in quorum court business, although capable of vetoing quorum court decisions.

Sharp County, Arkansas Elected countywide officials
Position	Officeholder	Party
County Judge	Mark Counts	Republican
County/Circuit Clerk	Alisa Black	Republican
Sheriff	Shane Russell	Republican
Treasurer	Wanda Girtman	Republican
Collector	Michelle Daggett	Republican
Assessor	Kathy Nix	Republican
Coroner	Renee Clay-Circle	Republican

The composition of the Quorum Court after the 2024 elections is 9 Republicans. Justices of the Peace (members) of the Quorum Court following the elections are:

- District 1: Kevin C. Dienst (R)
- District 2: Briana M. Dilorio (R)
- District 3: Joey Barnes (R)
- District 4: Roy Murphy (R)
- District 5: Tommy Estes (R)
- District 6: Jackie Pickett (R)
- District 7: Buell Wilkes (R)
- District 8: Jeral Hastings (R)
- District 9: Zack Baxter (R)

Additionally, the townships of Sharp County are entitled to elect their own respective constables, as set forth by the Constitution of Arkansas. Constables are largely of historical significance as they were used to keep the peace in rural areas when travel was more difficult. The township constables as of the 2024 elections are:

- District 1: Ashton Hester (R)
- District 2: George Jackson (R)
- District 3: David L. Gruger (R)
- District 4: Phillip Pickett (R)
- District 5: Kelly Newcom (R)
- District 6: Luke Vander Vort (R)

=== Politics ===
In recent years, Sharp County has trended heavily towards the Republican Party. The last Democrat to carry the county was Arkansas-native Bill Clinton in 1996. Since then, Democratic vote shares have plummeted, with Joe Biden in 2020 losing the county by a 4-to-1 margin to Republican Donald Trump, despite winning the national election.

United States presidential election results for Sharp County, Arkansas
Year	Republican		Democratic		Third party(ies)	
Year	No.	%	No.	%	No.	%
1896	230	14.23%	1,383	85.58%	3	0.19%
1900	394	26.84%	1,059	72.14%	15	1.02%
1904	288	28.29%	671	65.91%	59	5.80%
1908	317	23.05%	970	70.55%	88	6.40%
1912	114	10.75%	681	64.25%	265	25.00%
1916	251	20.52%	972	79.48%	0	0.00%
1920	400	26.42%	995	65.72%	119	7.86%
1924	210	21.11%	729	73.27%	56	5.63%
1928	501	38.24%	808	61.68%	1	0.08%
1932	142	9.57%	1,334	89.89%	8	0.54%
1936	289	23.40%	934	75.63%	12	0.97%
1940	433	28.17%	1,099	71.50%	5	0.33%
1944	664	35.08%	1,217	64.29%	12	0.63%
1948	295	20.30%	1,078	74.19%	80	5.51%
1952	655	38.60%	1,039	61.23%	3	0.18%
1956	645	40.31%	927	57.94%	28	1.75%
1960	911	51.01%	807	45.18%	68	3.81%
1964	1,215	39.88%	1,810	59.40%	22	0.72%
1968	1,136	32.83%	1,025	29.62%	1,299	37.54%
1972	2,677	69.71%	1,154	30.05%	9	0.23%
1976	2,151	37.85%	3,532	62.15%	0	0.00%
1980	3,420	53.30%	2,774	43.24%	222	3.46%
1984	4,392	63.38%	2,492	35.96%	46	0.66%
1988	3,623	54.79%	2,955	44.69%	34	0.51%
1992	2,486	34.55%	3,761	52.27%	949	13.19%
1996	2,635	37.80%	3,573	51.26%	762	10.93%
2000	3,698	51.89%	3,236	45.41%	192	2.69%
2004	4,097	54.85%	3,265	43.71%	108	1.45%
2008	4,535	62.53%	2,436	33.59%	281	3.87%
2012	4,921	67.57%	2,092	28.72%	270	3.71%
2016	5,407	74.59%	1,472	20.31%	370	5.10%
2020	5,938	78.48%	1,398	18.48%	230	3.04%
2024	5,978	80.38%	1,316	17.70%	143	1.92%

== Communities ==
=== Cities ===
- Ash Flat (county seat)
- Cave City
- Cherokee Village
- Hardy
- Highland
- Horseshoe Bend

=== Towns ===
- Evening Shade
- Sidney
- Williford

=== Census-designated place ===
- Ozark Acres

=== Unincorporated communities ===
- Poughkeepsie
- Aetna

=== Townships ===
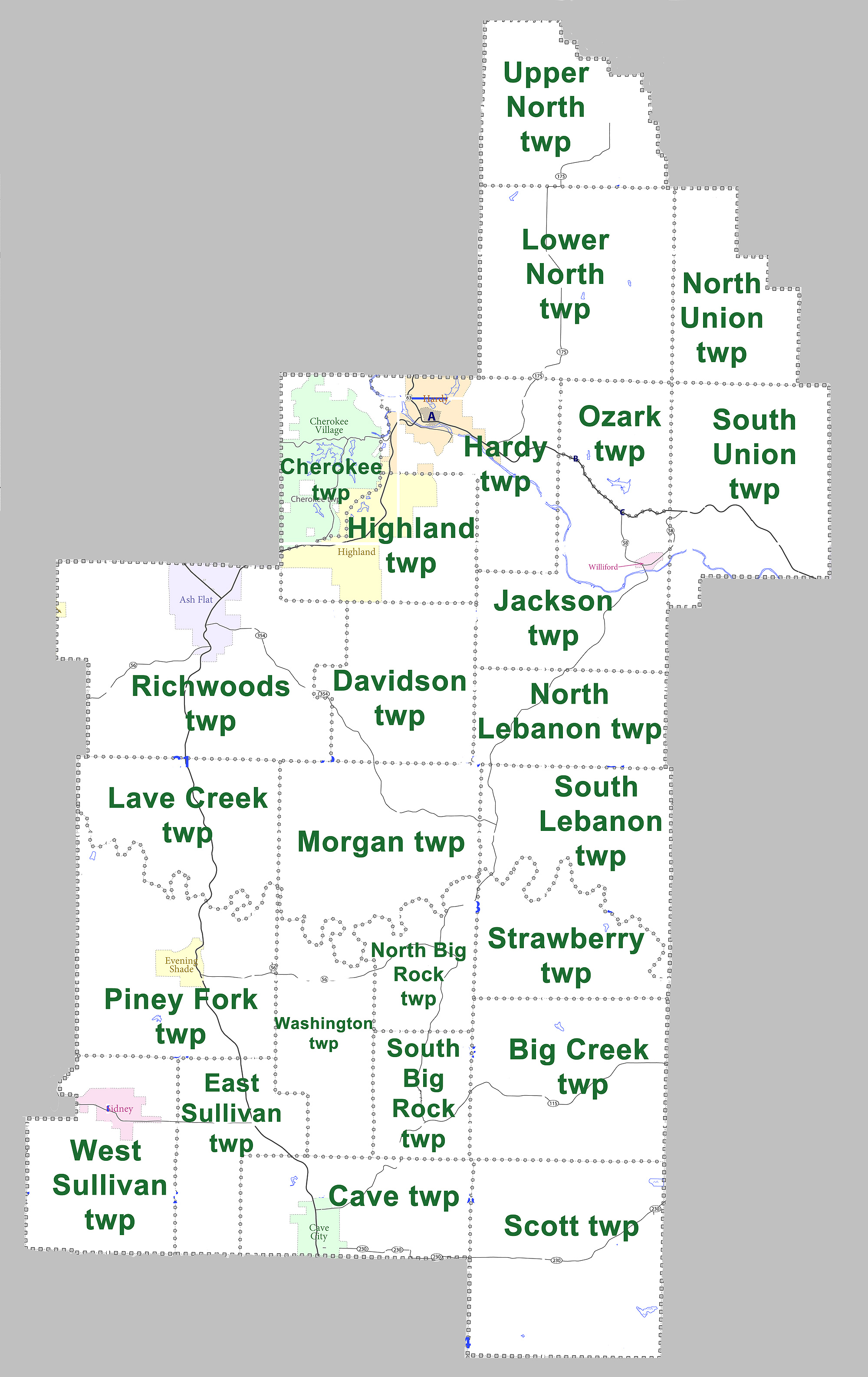
Townships in Sharp County, Arkansas as of 2010

Townships in Arkansas are the divisions of a county. Each township includes unincorporated areas; some may have incorporated cities or towns within part of their boundaries. Arkansas townships have limited purposes in modern times. However, the United States census does list Arkansas population based on townships (sometimes referred to as "county subdivisions" or "minor civil divisions"). Townships are also of value for historical purposes in terms of genealogical research. Each town or city is within one or more townships in an Arkansas county based on census maps and publications. The townships of Sharp County are listed below; listed in parentheses are the cities, towns, and/or census-designated places that are fully or partially inside the township.

- Big Creek
- Cave (Cave City)
- Cherokee (most of Cherokee Village, small part of Highland)
- Davidson
- East Sullivan
- Hardy (most of Hardy)
- Highland (most of Highland)
- Jackson (Williford)
- Lave Creek
- Lower North
- Morgan
- North Big Rock
- North Lebanon
- Ozark
- Piney Fork (Evening Shade)
- Richwoods (part of Ash Flat, small part of Horseshoe Bend)
- Scott
- South Big Rock
- South Union
- Strawberry
- Upper North
- Washington
- West Sullivan (most of Sideny)

Sharp County was featured on the PBS program Independent Lens for its 1906 "banishment" of all of its Black residents."

== See also ==
- List of lakes in Sharp County, Arkansas
- National Register of Historic Places listings in Sharp County, Arkansas
