= Sloan–Hendrix School District =

School district in Arkansas, United States

Address
- 1 Greyhound Circle Imboden, Arkansas, 72434; United States

District information
- Type: Public
- Grades: PreK–12
- NCES District ID: 0512480

Students and staff
- Students: 749
- Teachers: 65.04
- Staff: 54.39
- Student–teacher ratio: 11.52

Other information
- Website: www.sloan-hendrix.com

Sloan Hendrix School District is a public school district based in Imboden, Arkansas. The district serves more than 700 students in prekindergarten through grade 12 while employing more than 110 educators and staff at its three schools and district offices.

The school district encompasses 103.54 square miles (268.2 km^{2}) of land, in Lawrence County and Randolph County serving all or portions of Imboden, Ravenden, Black Rock, and Ravenden Springs.

== History ==
On July 1, 2010, the Twin Rivers School District was dissolved. A portion of the district was given to the Sloan-Hendrix district.

== Schools ==
- Sloan–Hendrix Elementary School, serving prekindergarten through grade 4.
- Sloan–Hendrix Middle School, serving grades 5 through 7.
- Sloan–Hendrix High School, serving grades 8 through 12.
