= 2009 TSFA season =

2009 TSFA Season
- League: Texas Sixman Football League
- Location: Holy Cross High School & The Winston School
- Teams: 13

Regular Season
- Duration: January 31, 2009 – April 26, 2009
- Weeks: 11

Playoffs
- Dates: May 3, 2009 – May 10, 2009
- Rounds: 2

Epler Cup XI
- Date: May 16, 2009
- Champions: Renegades
- MVP: Henry "Silk" Booth - #9 QB Renegades

All-star game
- Date: May 23, 2009
- Score: South 32 - North 6

Post Season Awards
- MVP: Carlos Garcia - #5 Bucs
- North Offensive POY: Phillip Barron - #8 Revolution
- North Defensive POY: Steve Navarro - #21 Longhorns
- South Offensive POY: Jimmie Kelley - #11 Bulldawgs
- South Defensive POY: Oscar Valdez - #99 Renegades

The 2009 TSFA season was the 11th regular season of the Texas Sixman Football League.

In 2008, veteran team changed ownership and name again, another longtime veteran returned and two rookies joined the mix. That left the TSFA with 13 teams again and the post season ended with the 4th straight all-star game. 2009 also marked the first TSFA night games with the Epler Cup and All-Star games being played at The Winston School.

== Teams ==
The Rhinos continued as the longest tenured organization in the TSFA coming back for their tenth season. The Bandits, Longhorns and Wolverines entered their ninth years of competition. The Bucs returned for their eighth season after a year hiatus. The Wrecking Crew returned for their fifth season. The Panthers returned for a fourth season of play. The Bulldawgs and Phoenix returned for their third seasons. The Revolution entered into their second season of play. The Ruff Ryders again changed ownership hands this time coming in as the Renegades. The Cowboys entered for their first season and the Outlawz was revived for their first season of play.

The Northern Conference consisted of the Bandits, Bucs, Longhorns, Outlawz, Panthers, Phoenix and Revolution. The Southern Conference consisted of the Bulldawgs, Cowboys, Renegades, Rhinos, Wolverines and Wrecking Crew.

== Regular season ==
The eleventh year of the TSFA lasted eleven weeks from January 31, 2009 to April 26, 2009.

=== Week 1 ===
January 31, 2009
Renegades 33 - Phoenix 12
Longhorns 31 - Cowboys 14
Rhinos 34 - Bucs 8
Outlawz 33 - Wolverines 26
Wrecking Crew 18 - Panthers 12
Bulldawgs 26 - Revolution 20

=== Week 2 ===
February 8, 2009
Wrecking Crew 23 - Bandits 20
Bulldawgs 41 - Bucs 21
Phoenix 30 - Cowboys 15
Revolution 13 - Renegades 12
Wolverines 20 - Longhorns 6
Outlawz 32 - Rhinos 19

=== Week 3 ===
February 15, 2009
Bucs 33 - Wolverines 25
Phoenix 26 - Wrecking Crew 19
Revolution 34 - Rhinos 20
Renegades 44 - Panthers 6
Outlawz 50 - Cowboys 6
Bulldawgs 30 - Bandits 19

=== Week 4 ===
February 22, 2009
Bulldawgs 26 - Panthers 18
Revolution 53 - Cowboys 24
Phoenix 37 - Wolverines 26
Longhorns 20 - Rhinos 12
Renegades 20 - Bandits 13
Bucs 22 - Wrecking Crew 13

=== Week 5 ===
March 1, 2009
Bulldawgs 19 - Rhinos 13
Longhorns 15 - Panthers 13
Wrecking Crew 13 - Wolverines 12
Bucs 37 - Phoenix 33
Renegades 53 - Cowboys 6 M*
Outlawz 40 - Bandits 21

- Cowboys forfeit the remainder of 2009

=== Week 6 ===
March 8, 2009
Outlawz 37 - Bucs 6
Renegades 26 - Wolverines 6
Bandits 31 - Longhorns 30
Wrecking Crew 34 - Bulldawgs 31
Revolution 42 - Panthers 12

=== Week 7 ===
March 22, 2009
Revolution 40 - Outlawz 33
Bulldawgs 33 - Renegades 21
Panthers 21 - Bandits 19
Rhinos 27 - Wolverines 14
Longhorns 33 - Phoenix 12

=== Week 8 ===
March 29, 2009
Phoenix 33 - Bandits 20
Bulldawgs 27 - Wolverines 19
Outlawz 40 - Panthers 27
Revolution 39 - Bucs 38
Renegades 26 - Wrecking Crew 7

=== Week 9 ===
April 5, 2009
Outlawz 45 - Phoenix 6
Revolution 1 - Bandits 0*
Bulldawgs 37 - Rhinos 19
Longhorns 21 - Bucs 0

- Bandits forfeit the remainder of 2009

=== Week 10 ===
April 11, 2009
Revolution 32 - Longhorns 18
Panthers 19 - Phoenix 13
Wrecking Crew 26 - Rhinos 21

=== Week 11 ===
April 26, 2009
Renegades 19 - Rhinos 6
Bucs 41 - Panthers 20
Outlawz 33 - Longhorns 6
Wrecking Crew 27 - Wolverines 0
Phoenix 27 - Revolution 20

== Playoffs ==
The eleventh year of playoffs for the TSFA consisted of the top 4 from each conference making the playoffs.

=== Conference Semi-Finals ===
May 3, 2009
Bucs 42 - Revolution 38
Outlawz 26 - Longhorns 19
Bulldawgs 29 - Rhinos 18
Renegades 31 - Wrecking Crew 0

=== Conference Championships ===
May 9, 2009
Outlawz 40 - Bucs 20
Renegades 24 - Bulldawgs 14

== Epler Cup XI ==
May 16, 2009
Renegades 38 - Outlawz 32 in overtime

Epler Cup XI MVP
Henry "Silk" Booth - #9 QB Renegades

=== Epler Cup XI Summary ===
The first ever TSFA night game was a classic, both teams made the league proud with the level of commitment, determination and sportsmanship with which both teams exhibited before, during and after this memorable championship game. Coach Fred Garcia and his Outlaw football team, along with a few hundred fans, attacked first. The Outlaw defense created turnovers and scored the first points of the game. Shawn Battles and his Renegade football team, along with a few hundred of their fans struck back and tied the score 6 all. The scoring exchange continued as both teams managed to each get 6 points on the board, for their respective teams, with only 45 seconds on the clock and halftime on the brink. The Renegades scored the final 6 points of the half with no time on the clock. Halftime arrived with both teams tied.

The second half saw a continuation of the first half with hard aggressive hits and big play after big play on both sides of the ball. #9 Henry Booth, a.k.a. Silk, made smart decisions while tucking the ball and running when nothing was open downfield. He played with a high level of energy and leadership that was unmatched. #66 Leo Reyes also had some timely catches as #15 Manuel Garcia found him on two consecutive plays open and earning positive yards as they drove towards their end zone with both teams continuing to match the other score after score.

The 4th quarter arrived and the match continued with big offensive and defensive plays. With seconds on the clock and a tie score, Outlawz QB Manuel Garcia connected with #21 Zachary Young on a deep pass that placed the Outlawz inside the 5 yard line. The Outlawz found themselves rushing downfield with the clock running, as they were out of timeouts, and a dramatic miscue resulted in overtime.

The Renegade defense was determined not to let the Outlawz score, led by South Defensive Player of the Year Oscar Valdez and South Defensive Player of the Year Runner-up Eric Trinidad the Renegade defense caused a turnover by Outlaw running back. Eric Trinidad, a.k.a. Turtle, forced the turnover.

The Renegades took possession as #32 Eric Martinez was not denied the end zone. The Renegades scored and secure the victory and earn The Epler Cup XI Championship. The final score was 38–32 in overtime.

Henry Booth was a unanimous selection as Epler Cup XI MVP.

== Regular-season awards ==
Northern Conference Offensive Player of the Year: Phillip Barron - #8 Revolution
Northern Conference Defensive Player of the Year: Steve Navarro - #21 Longhorns
Southern Conference Offensive Player of the Year: Jimmie Kelley - #11 Bulldawgs
Southern Conference Defensive Player of the Year: Oscar Valdez - #99 Renegades
2009 TSFA Regular Season MVP: Carlos Garcia - #5 Bucs

== 2009 TSFA All-Stars ==
The 2009 All-Star Game was held May 23, 2009 at the Winston School. It ended with the Southern Conference All-Stars beating the Northern Conference All-Stars with a score of 32 to 6. The game was sponsored by Pampered Chef.

=== Rosters ===
The All-Stars were selected on a voting system. The league's players, coaches and fans were allowed to vote for six weeks with the top players at each position getting a spot.

==== Northern Conference ====
Name	Team
Fermin Lopez	Revolution
Phillip Barron	Revolution
Curley Mitchelle	Outlawz
Michael Sanchez	Outlawz
Damien Alston	Revolution
Richard Cardenas	Revolution
Erwin Stilzig	Revolution
Dontay Evans	Longhorns
Richard Mireles	Outlawz
Eddie Trejo	Outlawz
Mario Bustamante	Outlawz
Steve Navarro	Longhorns
Ray Garcia	Outlawz
Aleric Clark	Bandits
Zach Young	Outlawz
Nathan Ruiz	Revolution

==== Southern Conference ====
Name	Team
Jimmie Kelley	Bulldawgs
Blake Sledge	Bulldawgs
Leonard Walker	Wrecking Crew
John Martin	Bulldawgs
George Reyes	Rhinos
Andre Williams	Wolverines
Mike Castanin	Bulldawgs
Vincent Stephenson	Renegades
Oscar Valdez	Renegades
Patrick Kinslow	Bulldawgs
Shaun Battles	Renegades
Chris Boldon	Bulldawgs
Richard Martinez	Renegades
JT Taylor	Wrecking Crew
Eric Martinez	Renegades
Eric Trinidad	Renegades

== 2009 All-TSFA team ==
=== 1st Team ===
Head Coach: Freddie Garcia

==== Offense ====
QB: Carlos Garcia - 5 Bucs
RB: Phillip Barron - 8 Revo
RB: Zachary Young - 21 Outlawz
WR: Michael Sanchez - 85 Outlawz
WR: George Reyes - 0 Rhinos
WR: Richard Cardenas - 9 Revo
C: Erwin Stilzig - 51 Revo

==== Defense ====
DE: Dawg Valdez - 99 Renegades
DE: Vince Stevenson - 7 Renegades
LB: Eric Trinidad - 6 Renegades
LB: Patrick Kinslow - 7 Bulldawgs
DB: Steve Navarro - 21 Longhorns
DB: Chris Boldon - 10 Bulldawgs
DB: Richard Martinez - 4 Renegades

==== Special teams ====
K: Nathan Ruiz - 11 Revo
Ut: Eric Martinez - 32 Renegades

=== 2nd Team ===
Head Coach: Mike Molina

==== Offense ====
QB: Henry 'Silk' Booth - 9 Renegades
RB: Leonard Walker - 2 Wrecking Crew
RB: Eric Martinez - 32 Renegades
WR: Andre Williams - 9 Wolverines
WR: John Martin - 23 Bulldawgs
WR: Jeremy Nellum - 81 Phoenix
C: Aaron Caudell - 55 Wolverines

==== Defense ====
DE: Dontay Evans - 3 Longhorns
DE: Richard Mireles - 1 Outlawz
LB: Shaun Battles - 8 Renegades
LB: Eddie Trejo - 7 Outlawz
DB: Ray Garcia - 3 Outlawz
DB: Nathan Ruiz - 11 Revo
DB: JT Taylor - 5 Wrecking Crew

==== Special teams ====
K: Dawg Valdez - 99 Renegades
Ut: Daylin Rowland - 5 Renegades

=== Honorable Mention ===
==== Offense ====
QB: Manuel Garcia - 15 Outlawz
QB: Jimmie Kelley - 11 Bulldawgs
RB: Curly Mitchelle - 22 Outlawz
RB: Blake Sledge - 33 Bulldawgs
WR: Gibby Alverado - 32 Outlawz
WR: Damien Alston - 6 Revo
C: Leo Reyes - 66 Outlawz

==== Defense ====
DE: Chris Davis - 57 Wrecking Crew
LB: Mario Bustamante - 2 Outlawz
DB: Noel Miller - 4 Phoenix
DB: Sheridan Young - 37 Rhinos

==== Special teams ====
Ut: Robert Young - 28 Phoenix
