= 2008 TSFA season =

2008 TSFA Season
- League: Texas Sixman Football League
- Location: Holy Cross High School & The Winston School
- Teams: 13

Regular Season
- Duration: February 2, 2008 – April 20, 2008
- Weeks: 11

Playoffs
- Dates: April 27, 2008 – May 4, 2008
- Rounds: 2

Epler Cup X
- Date: May 11, 2008
- Champions: Revolution
- MVP: Pablo Garcia - #0 CB Revolution

All-star game
- Date: May 25, 2008
- Score: North 30 - South 29

Post Season Awards
- MVP: Tim Huizar - #7 Revolution
- North Offensive POY: Tim Huizar - #7 Revolution
- North Defensive POY: Steve Navarro - #21 Longhorns
- South Offensive POY: Frankie Guerra - #8 Wolverines
- South Defensive POY: Vincent Stevenson - #7 Ruff Ryders

The 2008 TSFA season was the tenth regular season of the Texas Sixman Football League.

There was a little shake up in the team roster for 2008. A veteran team changed ownership and names with one returning under a new banner as well as two returning second year teams after varying hiatus'. That left the TSFA with 13 teams again and the post season ended with the 3rd straight all-star game.

== Teams ==
The Rhinos continued as the longest tenured organization in the TSFA coming back for their ninth season. The Bandits, Longhorns and Wolverines entered their eighth years of competition. The Ruff Ryders and Wrecking Crew returned for their fourth seasons. The Panthers returned for a third season of play. The Bulldawgs and Phoenix returned for their second seasons. The Hit-Squad re-entered the league with a lot of Hurricane players for their second season and the Jets returned after a one-year hiatus. The Bucs changed ownership and names/colors to be the Storm. The Revolution entered their first season being the Rage reborn.

The Northern Conference consisted of the Bandits, Hit-Squad, Longhorns, Panthers, Phoenix and Revolution. The Southern Conference consisted of the Bulldawgs, Jets, Rhinos, Ruff Ryders, Storm, Wolverines and Wrecking Crew.

== Regular season ==
The tenth year of the TSFA lasted eleven weeks from February 2, 2008 to April 20, 2008.

=== Week 1 ===
February 2, 2008
Bulldawgs 39 - Hit Squad 33
Bandits 19 - Longhorns 18
Wolverines 39 - Panthers 38
Wrecking Crew 7 - Ruff Ryders 6
Revolution 18 - Rhinos 14
Jets 26 - Phoenix 14

=== Week 2 ===
February 10, 2008
Wolverines 52 - Storm 7 Bulldawgs 39 - Jets 28
Revolution 48 - Panthers 13
Bandits 19 - Rhinos 18
Ruff Ryders 25 - Longhorns 20
Hit Squad 33 - Phoenix 30

=== Week 3 ===
February 17, 2008
Wolverines 19 - Wrecking Crew 13
Panthers 41 - Phoenix 6
Revolution 20 - Longhorns 12
Bulldawgs 8 - Ruff Ryders 0
Bandits 35 - Storm 7
Rhinos 24 - Jets 13

=== Week 4 ===
February 24, 2008
Phoenix 34 - Bandits 27
Revolution 32 - Wrecking Crew 26
Bulldawgs 32 - Wolverines 26
Panthers 30 - Storm 27
Rhinos 30 - Longhorns 27
Hit Squad 21 - Ruff Ryders 6

=== Week 5 ===
March 2, 2008
Jets 21 - Panthers 19
Bulldawgs 25 - Storm 6 Revolution 32 - Hit Squad 19
Rhinos 20 - Wrecking Crew 19
Longhorns 40 - Wolverines 26

=== Week 6 ===
March 9, 2008
Longhorns 19 - Phoenix 6
Rhinos 41 - Hit Squad 34
Panthers 26 - Bandits 6
Revolution 14 - Ruff Ryders 12
Jets 25 - Wolverines 19
Wrecking Crew 27 - Storm 6

=== Week 7 ===
March 16, 2008
Hit Squad 27 - Panthers 26
Longhorns 25 - Storm 24
Revolution 30 - Phoenix 13
Jets 1 - Bandits 0
Ruff Ryders 19 - Rhinos 13
Wrecking Crew 12 - Bulldawgs 6

=== Week 8 ===
March 30, 2008
Wrecking Crew 19 - Panthers 14
Storm 24 - Phoenix 20
Wolverines 32 - Hit Squad 20
Revolution 24 - Bandits 6
Ruff Ryders 21 - Jets 6
Rhinos 8 - Bulldawgs 6

=== Week 9 ===
April 6, 2008
Jets 19 - Revolution 16
Bandits 30 - Hit Squad 21
Wrecking Crew 25 - Phoenix 6
Bulldawgs 1 - Longhorns 0
Rhinos 23 - Wolverines 0
Ruff Ryders 25 - Storm 7

=== Week 10 ===
April 13, 2008
Longhorns 24 - Hit Squad 19
Wolverines 42 - Phoenix 25
Panthers 16 - Buldlawgs 14
Ruff Ryders 21 - Bandits 13
Rhinos 35 - Storm 25
Wrecking Crew 32 - Jets 7

=== Week 11 ===
April 20, 2008
Bandits 26 - Bulldawgs 9
Wrecking Crew 19 - Hit Squad 12
Longhorns 13 - Panthers 12
Revolution 29 - Phoenix 25
Ruff Ryders 20 - Wolverines 13
Storm 27 - Jets 6

== Playoffs ==
The tenth year of playoffs for the TSFA consisted of the top 4 from each conference making the playoffs.

=== Conference Semi-Finals ===
April 27, 2008
Revolution 27 - Bandits 26
Panthers 30 - Longhorns 27
Bulldawgs 26 - Wrecking Crew 18
Ruff Ryders 20 - Rhinos 19

=== Conference Championships ===
May 4, 2008
Revolution 30 - Panthers 26
Ruff Ryders 14 - Bulldawgs 12

== Epler Cup X ==
May 11, 2008
Revolution 10 - Ruff Ryders 0

Epler Cup X MVP
Pablo Garcia - #0 CB Revolution

== Regular Season Awards ==
Northern Conference Offensive Player of the Year: Tim Huizar - #7 Revolution
Northern Conference Defensive Player of the Year: Steve Navarro - #21 Longhorns
Southern Conference Offensive Player of the Year: Frankie Guerra - #8 Wolverines
Southern Conference Defensive Player of the Year: Vincent Stevenson - #7 Ruff Ryders
2008 TSFA Regular Season MVP: Tim Huizar - #7 Revolution

== 2008 TSFA All-Stars ==
The 2008 All-Star Game was held May 24, 2008 at the Winston School. It ended with the Northern Conference All-Stars defeating the Southern Conference All-Stars with a last second field goal 30 to 29. The game was sponsored by JK Athletics and Pampered Chef.

=== Rosters ===
The All-Stars were selected for the first time on a voting system. The league's players, coaches and fans were allowed to vote for six weeks with the top players at each position getting a spot with at least one slot per team guaranteed.

==== Northern Conference ====
No.	Name	Team
1	ER Saenz	Phoenix
2	Lionel Hudek	Panthers
3	Aleric Clark	Bandits
4	Pete Martinez	Longhorns
5	Abe Vargas	Bandits
6	Angel Sanchez	Revolution
7	Tim Huizar	Revolution
8	Phillip Barron	Revolution
9	Richard Cardenas	Revolution
11	Nathan Ruiz	Revolution
15	Luke Byars	Phoenix
32	Eric Martinez	Bandits
33	AJ Sanchez	Panthers
51	Erwin Stilzig	Revolution
52	Tony Apolinar	Longhorns
84	Damien Alston	Hit-Squad

==== Southern Conference ====
No.	Name	Team
0	George Reyes	Rhinos
1	Joey Gonzales	Wrecking Crew
3	Richard Martinez	Ruff Ryders
4	Joey Gonzales	Wrecking Crew
7	Vincent Stephenson	Ruff Ryders
8	Frankie Guerra	Wolverines
10	Chris Boldon	Bulldawgs
13	Eric Gomez	Ruff Ryders
17	Eman Fondren	Bulldawgs
21	Andre Chillers	Wolverines
23	Mike Rittenberry	Wolverines
32	Robert Hernandez	Wolverines
34	Luis Garcia	Bucs
43	Jason Kuhstoss	Rhinos
55	Aaron Caudell	Wolverines
87	Marquis Washington	Wrecking Crew
99	Oscar Valdez	Ruff Ryders
