= Texas Sixman Football League =

- Current season, competition or edition: 2011 TSFL Season
- Sport: American Sixman Football
- Founded: 1998 in San Antonio, Texas
- First season: 1999
- Folded: 2012
- CEO: Ariel Portillo
- No. of teams: 8
- Country: United States
- Last champion: Tigers (1st title)
- Most titles: Bandits(4 titles)
- Website: Texas6man.com

The Texas Sixman Football League (TSFL) was a complex-based amateur six-man football league based in San Antonio, Texas. The league comprises eight teams, all of which played their games at one (usually parochial) school in the San Antonio area each season, and operated from 1999 through 2012. It is the direct predecessor to the current Texas Eight-Man Football League that began play in 2013.

== Rule guidelines ==
The Texas Sixman Football League employs the services of San Antonio TASO officials for their football season. The TSFL rules are based on the same guidelines as the NCAA Rulebook. The TSFL also follows the University Interscholastic League (UIL) Sixman Football Exceptions

=== TSFL-specific rules ===
The TSFL also has a couple rules that are different and specific to the league, the biggest being on PAT conversions. In UIL sixman, a turnover or blocked kick cannot be returned, but in the TSFL an interception, fumble or blocked kick can be returned by the defense for 1 point. (This is an adaptation of an NCAA football rule; ironically, the UIL uses NCAA rules for 11-man football but uses the rules set forth by the NFHS for six-man, because the NCAA does not have provisions for six-man football.) This may not seem like much, but in Week 1 of the 2010 season a blocked kick return was the difference in the game as the time was expired and the returning team won by that point.

The TSFL also has specific rules on the size of the team, each player and coach having matching uniforms and fines for ejections and fighting. Each field that the TSFL has played on also has had its own set of rules for the location.

== Texas Sixman Football League ==
The Texas Sixman Football League (TSFL) is an organization based out of San Antonio, TX. All of the TSFL's games are played at River City Christian School. Currently eight teams battle it out over a nine-week schedule (two preseason games) to win the Epler Cup trophy. The TSFL is currently completing their 13th consecutive season of competition with 8 teams.

== History of the TSFL ==
The TSFL was established in 1998 as the Sixman Football Association (SFA). It was set up to offer full-contact, recreational football at the adult level. The TSFL's goal is to allow players to compete in a local, organized and competitive league and enjoy the game of football past the high school and/or collegiate level. The league involves a variety of talent levels ranging from players that have played professionally to players that have never played football before joining the TSFL. Throughout the years the size of the league has fluctuated from four teams (1999) all the way up to fifteen teams (two seasons). The name of the league has also changed according to growning. It was the Sixman Football Association (SFA) from 1999 to 2003 and again in 2005. In 2004 there was a temporary change to the San Antonio Sixman Football Association (SASFA) due to a possible branch starting in Austin, TX. From 2006 to 2010 the league was known at the Texas Sixman Football Association (TSFA) due to a sister league starting play in Tampa, FL as the Florida Sixman Football Association (FSFA) and then ultimately the Southeastern Christian Association of Sixman Football (SCASF). In 2011, the Texas Sixman Football League (TSFL) was born with the takeover of commissioner Ariel Portillo.

Beginning in 2013, the teams that composed the Texas Sixman Football League converted to eight-man football and launched the Texas Eightman Football League (TEFL).

=== 1999 ===
The inaugural season of the SFA saw four teams answer the call and step up to fight for a chance at the Epler Cup Championship. The Seminoles walked through the regular season with a perfect 7–0 record, only to be upset in the Epler Cup by the hungry Wolf Pack 43 to 36.

=== 2000 ===
The second season of the SFA saw the league double in size and separate into two conferences. The Northern Conference consisted of the Mean Machine, Rhinos, Wolf Pack and Vipers and the Southern Conference had the Bobcats, Longhorns, Red Raiders and Seminoles. The Seminoles and the Wolf Pack topped their respective conferences during the regular season. The Longhorns and the Wolf Pack made it to the Epler Cup championship with the Wolf Pack taking home the Cup by a score of 46 to 40. After the Epler Cup game there was an altercation with one of the Longhorns players and they were subsequently banned from the league.

=== 2001 ===
The 2001 season saw six new teams enter the league with two leaving bringing the 3rd season total up to twelve teams, marking the first time in league history that a season was completed with a double digit number of teams. This year the top four from each conference going to the playoffs with no bye weeks. The season saw the first team to not win any games and have 10 losses in the 0-10 Red Raiders. On the other side of the coin the Mean Machine had the best record in the league with the first 10 win season and the Seminoles won the Southern Conference regular season crown. Both teams eventually went down with the Mean Machine losing a rematch to the 9-1 Sharks in the semi-finals and the Seminoles losing a first round upset to the 4-6 Rhinos. The Rhinos completed the improbable with a 28 to 24 victory over the Sharks in Epler Cup III.

=== 2002 ===
The 2002 season was unique in the fact that one existing team had a name change, one team re-entered the league with a name change and another joined bring the total up to thirteen teams to start the season. What also made the season unique was that the top 5 teams made it to the playoffs from the odd numbered Northern Conference with the bottom two teams playing in a wild card game. The Bandits (renamed Sharks) had the league's second straight 10–0 season with the Mad Dogs dominating the Southern Conference going into the playoffs. 2002 marked the first year that both regular season conference champions also won their respective conference championship games. The Bandits claimed their first championship with a 34 to 27 win over the Mad Dogs in the Epler Cup IV.

=== 2003 ===
The fifth season of the Sixman Football Association saw the expansion streak stop with 1 team dropping and no teams joining up. The conferences stayed aligned how they were with the Southern Conference keeping its integrity for the third straight year. The Outlawz set a record of 11 regular season wins with the Bandits repeating their 10 wins, but having one loss to conference foe Outlawz. The Rage won the Southern Conference in the regular season for the first time. The Rage continued as expected and cruised into the Epler Cup game while the Bandits avenged a week 3 loss in a shootout with the Outlawz in the Northern Conference Championship game. The Bandits wrapped up their second straight Epler Cup with a victory over the Rage with a score of 52 to 36.

=== 2004 ===
The SFA saw only two names changes for the 2004 season, but one was rather big. The biggest change was the change from the Sixman Football Association to the San Antonio Sixman Football Association (SASFA). The reason for this change was the taking over of new commissioner Frank Rios and plans to open up a new branch in Austin, TX called the Austin Sixman Football Association (ASFA). The plans for this league eventually fell through, but the name change stayed in effect for 2004. The Outlawz of 2002 and 2003 took back their original name of the Longhorns. The conferences stayed the same for the second straight year with the Longhorns and Rage winning their respective conferences for the regular season. The Bandits repeated their week 9 victory of the Longhorns to make it into Epler Cup VI. The Mad Dogs also had a repeat victory over conference rival Rage to enter into the SASFA championship. The week 11 matchup between the Epler Cup teams was an overtime thriller that left fans with expectations of the same for the Mother's Day rematch. Unfortunately for those in attendance the Mad Dogs couldn't fulfill that prediction and lost by 12 to the Bandits 25 to 13. It was the Bandits third straight Epler Cup victory giving them the record of championships.

=== 2005 ===
Expansion was the key word for the 2005 SFA Season. After changing the name of the league back to the Sixman Football Association, the roster of teams split up drastically. The Mean Machine had players split from it creating three new teams in the league. The Seminoles sold their team slot and had the name changed and two newcomers were scheduled to join the league before one dropped out at the last second leaving the SFA with fifteen teams to enter the season. The SFA had their longest regular season in history with twelve weeks of hard hitting action followed by three incredible weeks of post season play. The Bandits again entered the playoffs as the number 1 seed after another 10 win perfect season and the Rage stood on top again for a third straight season. The Bandits took care of business while the Rage were upset in the conference championship by the upstart Ruff Ryders. The Bandits showed that veteran experience can win over youthful energy with a shootout victory of 40–38 in Epler Cup VII. The win was the Bandits fourth straight Epler Cup Championship in a row.

=== 2006 ===
There was only small changes for the 2006 TSFA Season including a field change to the practice fields at Judson High School in Converse, TX. The Wolf Pack folded after being the last original team, the Mad Dogs dissolved into what was to be known the Gladiators. A couple new teams also joined the league leaving the league at 15 as in 2005. The League did take the moniker of the Texas Sixman Football Association with the kickoff of sister league Florida Sixman Football Association in Tampa, FL. 2006 was the first year in league history where both conferences were undefeated with both the Bandits and Ruff Ryders sitting at 9-0. Both teams made it through the playoffs experiencing close games in their respective conference championships. The Ruff Ryders completed something that hadn't happen in four seasons. They unseated the seemingly unbeatable Bandits from the top with a 33 to 19 victory. Following the season was the first year with an All-Star game with the South defeating the North 18 to 6 followed a few weeks later by the first TSFA Banquet.

=== 2007 ===
The 2007 TSFA Season saw the league sign a contract with Holy Cross High School to make money off the gate. 2007 brought the biggest drop of teams with six teams leaving and only being replaced by three new teams bringing the total down to twelve. 2007 saw the beginning of regular press coverage for the TSFA with Dontay Evans stepping up and beginning a semi-regular breakdown of news called Tay's Newsletter. The Bandits reign of dominating in the regular season was stopped with them placing in 3rd in the regular season with the Longhorns claiming their first regular season title since 2004. The Ruff Ryders again dominated in the regular season, but lost in the conference championship to the Wrecking Crew in a rematch of week 10. The Bandits made their seventh straight Epler Cup Game (1st as Sharks) only to lose to former quarterback/utility back Henry "Silk" Booth and the Wrecking Crew 46 to 38. The second straight All-Star game saw the South dominate the North 32-12.

=== 2008 ===
The TSFA continued their contract with Holy Cross High School in 2008 season, but also signed a contract with The Winston School to rotate games on a weekly basis. There was yet another shuffle with teams, but all the "new" teams that entered the league were veteran teams or renamed franchises. 2008 saw two new faces on top of the standings with the Revolution and the Rhinos winning their respective regular season conferences. The Ruff Ryders made it to the Epler Cup after being the last seed for the playoffs, but were shut out by a score of 10 to 0 against the Revolution in the tenth anniversary Championship game. The Northern Conference won their first All-Star game 30–29 over the South.

=== 2009 ===
The TSFA's 2009 season saw the contract with Holy Cross High School continue while only playing a handful of games at The Winston School. The Bucs returned and the Outlawz name returned to the scene while the Ruff Ryders had a name and owner change while a rookie team stepped out onto the field. Tay's Newsletter expanded to more regular blogs and also into online videos with a name change to TSFA Live. 2009 saw the fall of what was left of the Bandits dynasty as they went 1-8 and forfeit the rest of their games after week 8. The Revolution won the North in the regular season with the Bulldawgs landing on top of the standings for their first time. The Revolution were upset by Carlos Garcia and the Bucs in round 1 of the playoffs and the Bulldawgs couldn't handle the Renegades in the conference championships. The Outlawz easily defeated the Bucs in the conference championship and made it to Epler Cup XI. Playing under the lights for the first time in TSFA history the Outlawz and Renegades went into the first ever Epler Cup overtime game with the Renegades pulling it out 38 to 32. The South destroyed the North 32 to 6 in the fourth annual All-Star game.

=== 2010 ===
The 2010 TSFA Season had at least a temporary end to the conference layout of the previous ten seasons as with dropping down to nine teams, league officials decided to eliminate the conferences. The TSFA signed a contract to play all league games at the River City Christian School. TSFA Live expanded to weekly webcasts, a co-host and regular appearance of special guests and interviews. The Renegades completed an undefeated season going 8-0 and the Wolverines made the playoffs for the first time since 2002. Both teams took care of business to get to Epler Cup XII with the Wolverines avenging a Week 6 loss and winning 26 to 25.

=== 2011 ===
This most recent season the TSFL saw a couple big changes. For the first time since 2004 the TSFL changed hands. Frank Rios stepped down as commissioner and Ariel Portillo, long time TSFL veteran and head coach/owner of the Longhorns, took over the reins. With the takeover the league name was again changed, this time to the Texas Sixman Football League (TSFL). The TSFL picked up a couple sponsors for the first time and held them over the season. The sister league in Florida also ceased playing for the 2011 season. The Renegades left with the majority of the players forming another team, also a veteran team rejoined the league with a couple dropping bringing 2011's team total to eight. The Tigers dominated the regular season with no close games and a first round bye with the Longhorns earning the number 2 seed and a bye as well. Both teams overcame deficits in the semi-finals of 6 and 14 points respectively. The Tigers and Longhorns played a back and forth game with the Tigers making a 2 touchdown comeback and winning in overtime to make Epler Cup XIII one for the ages.

=== 2012 ===
2012 was the final season for the Texas Sixman Football League.
