= LISA Academy =

Location
- 10825 Financial Centre Pwy; Little Rock, Pulaski County, Arkansas 72205; United States
- 34°45′05″N 92°23′18″W

Information
- School type: Public charter
- Opened: 2004 (22 years ago)
- Status: Open
- NCES District ID: 0500074
- Authority: Arkansas Department of Education (ADE)
- CEEB code: 041486
- NCES School ID: 050007401107
- Teaching staff: 10.09 (on FTE basis)
- Grades: K-12
- Enrollment: 3700 (2022-2023)
- Student to teacher ratio: 25.77
- Education system: Charter
- Classes offered: Regular, STEM, Career Focus, Advanced Placement
- Colors: Red, grey, white
- Athletics conference: 3A-4A WEST (22/23)
- Sports: Volleyball, golf, basketball, soccer, tennis, track, swimming
- Mascot: Jaguars
- Team name: LISA Academy Jaguars
- Rival: LISA Academy North Jaguars; Academics Plus Falcons
- Accreditation: ADE
- Affiliation: Arkansas Activities Association
- Website: www.lisaacademy.org

LISA Academy is an open-enrollment public charter school headquartered in Little Rock, Arkansas, United States. Formed in 2004, LISA or Learn Innovate Support Achieve serves more than 2200 students in grades K through 12. A STEM (science, technology, engineering, and mathematics) focused charter campuses are located across the state of Arkansas. With college and career focused education LISA has been recognized as one of the top ranking schools in the state of Arkansas US News

== History ==
The first campus was opened in 2004 in Little Rock, but soon expanded in 2008, a second campus known as LISA Academy North opened. With grades K-12 the demand soon spread across the central Arkansas area with the opening of LISA West Elementary, followed quickly by Northwest Arkansas with the addition of Springdale, Rogers-Bentonville, and Fayetteville campuses. The innovative Hybrid model also opened in 2021 with satellite locations stretching from Forth Smith on the west of Arkansas to Jonesboro in the east.

== Academics ==
As a public charter school, LISA Academy exceeds the requirements of the Smart Core curriculum developed the Arkansas Department of Education (ADE), which requires students to complete 22 credit units before graduation. Students engage in regular and Advanced Placement (AP) coursework and exams, preparatory courses in ACT/SAT testing, leadership workshops, and partnerships with local colleges and universities.

LISA Academy has partnered with the University of Central Arkansas, the University of Arkansas at Little Rock and the University of Arkansas at Monticello to offer twelve concurrent credit courses in math, English, history and music.

The National Center for Educational Achievement (NCEA), a department of ACT, Inc., recognized LISA Academy High School as a 2012 NCEA Higher Performing School. LISA Academy High received Higher Performing (HP) recognition in area of Literacy.

== Extracurricular activities ==
The LISA Academy Charter School mascot for academic and athletic teams is the Jaguar with school colors of red and grey.

=== Solar Car Engineering ===
LISA Academy North has participated in the Solar Car Challenge competition in Texas Motor Speedway, Fort Worth, Texas since 2017. High School students have designed, built and completed their solar car. They have competed in the Classic and Advanced Classis Divisions. In 2021, the team was awarded 1st place in 2- and 3-D mechanical drawing of the car. LISA North has the only solar car team in the state of Arkansas.

=== Athletics ===
The LISA Academy Jaguars participate in various interscholastic activities in the 1A 5 North Conference administered by the Arkansas Activities Association. The Jaguars compete in volleyball, golf (boys/girls), basketball (boys/girls), tennis (boys/girls), soccer (boys/girls), Fencing (starting in 2014-2015 school year), and softball (starting in 2014-2015 school year).

== See also ==
- LISA Academy North
