= 2007 TSFA season =

2007 TSFA Season
- League: Texas Sixman Football League
- Location: Holy Cross High School
- Teams: 12

Regular Season
- Duration: February 3, 2007 – April 7, 2007
- Weeks: 10

Playoffs
- Dates: April 15, 2007 – April 27, 2007
- Rounds: 2

Epler Cup IX
- Date: May 6, 2007
- Champions: Wrecking Crew
- MVP: Henry "Silk" Booth - #6 QB Wrecking Crew

All-star game
- Date: May 22, 2007
- Score: South 31 - North 12

Post Season Awards
- MVP: Leonard Walker - #2 Wrecking Crew
- North Offensive POY: Andre Williams - #11 Hurricanes
- North Defensive POY: Steve Navarro - #21 Longhorns
- South Offensive POY: Raynald Ray - #47 Ruff Ryders
- South Defensive POY: Joey Gonzalez - #3 Wrecking Crew

The 2007 TSFA season was the ninth regular season of the Texas Sixman Football League.

2007 saw the largest dropoff in teams in TSFA history losing six teams and only being replaced with three leaving the league with twelve teams for the first time since 2004. 2007 also marked the first time the TSFA had a contract with a school to be able to generate income of the gate. The second Annual All-Star game was also completed.

== Teams ==
With the folding of the Red Raiders, the Rhinos were left as the longest tenured organization in the TSFA coming back for their eighth season. The Bandits, Bucs, Longhorns and Wolverines entered their seventh years of competition. The Hurricanes, Ruff Ryders and Wrecking Crew returned for their third seasons. The Panther returned for a sophomore campaign. The Bulldawgs, Phoenix and Texans joined the league with the Phoenix being at a disadvantage getting the go ahead to enter the TSFA with only a month before start after the Six-Pack dropped at the last second.

The Northern Conference consisted of the Bandits, Bucs, Hurricanes, Longhorns, Panthers and Phoenix. The Southern Conference consisted of the Bulldawgs, Rhinos, Ruff Ryders, Texans, Wolverines and Wrecking Crew.

== Regular season ==
The ninth year of the TSFA lasted ten weeks from February 3, 2007 to April 7, 2007.

=== Week 1 ===
February 3, 2007
Hurricanes 27 - Bulldawgs 14
Texans 43 - Bucs 0
Rhinos 16 - Bandits 12
Ruff Ryders 33 - Longhorns 13
Wrecking Crew 33 - Panthers 8
Wolverines 49 - Phoenix 0 M

=== Week 2 ===
February 11, 2007
Bulldawgs 46 - Phoenix 0 M
Panthers 26 - Texans 13
Longhorns 13 - Rhinos 6
Hurricanes 39 - Wolverines 6
Wrecking Crew 39 - Bucs 6
Ruff Ryders 34 - Bandits 6

=== Week 3 ===
February 18, 2007
Bandits 26 - Wrecking Crew 25
Ruff Ryders 47 - Phoenix 0 M
Bulldawgs 25 - Panthers 13
Longhorns 1 - Texans 0
Rhinos 14 - Hurricanes 13
Wolverines 50 - Bucs 12

=== Week 4 ===
February 25, 2007
Bandits 35 - Texans 6
Ruff Ryders 22 - Hurricanes 7
Bulldawgs 45 - Bucs 0 M
Wrecking Crew 30 - Longhorns 0
Rhinos 49 - Phoenix 0 M
Panthers 35 - Wolverines 6

=== Week 5 ===
March 4, 2007
Rhinos 52 - Bucs 12
Bandits 40 - Wolverines 6
Wrecking Crew 46 - Phoenix 0 M
Ruff Ryders 33 - Panthers 0
Bulldawgs 19 - Longhorns 13
Hurricanes 24 - Texans 18

=== Week 6 ===
March 11, 2007
Longhorns 1 - Bandits 0
Panthers 41 - Bucs 12
Hurricanes 48 - Phoenix 0 M
Rhinos 14 - Bulldawgs 6
Texans 26 - Ruff Ryders 25
Wrecking Crew 46 - Wolverines 6

=== Week 7 ===
March 18, 2007
Hurricanes 24 - Bandits 13
Longhorns 1 - Bucs 0
Panthers 50 - Phoenix 0 M
Rhinos 36 - Wolverines 0
Ruff Ryders 46 - Bulldawgs 26
Wrecking Crew 33 - Texans 7

=== Week 8 ===
March 25, 2007
Hurricanes 33 - Panthers 13
Bandits 54 - Bucs 12
Longhorns 47 - Phoenix 7
Wrecking Crew 25 - Bulldawgs 6
Ruff Ryders 27 - Rhinos 20
Texans 32 - Wolverines 13

=== Week 9 ===
April 1, 2007
Bandits 33 - Panthers 0
Phoenix 1 - Bucs 0
Longhorns 26 - Hurricanes 20
Bulldawgs 27 - Texans 26
Ruff Ryders 26 - Wolverines 6
Wrecking Crew 19 - Rhinos 15

=== Week 10 ===
April 7, 2007
Bandits 33 - Phoenix 29
Hurricanes 1 - Bucs 0
Longhorns 1 - Panthers 1
Bulldawgs 24 - Wolverines 6
Ruff Ryders 33 - Wrecking Crew 21
Rhinos 41 - Texans 6

== Playoffs ==
The ninth year of playoffs for the TSFA consisted of the top 4 from each conference making the playoffs.

=== Conference Semi-Finals ===
April 15, 2007
Bandits 39 - Hurricanes 26
Longhorns 40 - Panthers 12
Wrecking Crew 25 - Rhinos 14
Ruff Ryders 31 - Bulldawgs 6

=== Conference Championships ===
April 27, 2007
Bandits 32 - Longhorns 27
Wrecking Crew 46 - Ruff Ryders 38

== Epler Cup IX ==
May 6, 2007
Wrecking Crew 44 - Bandits 31

Epler Cup IX MVP
Henry "Silk" Booth - #6 QB Wrecking Crew

== Regular Season Awards ==
Northern Conference Offensive Player of the Year: Andre Williams - #11 Hurricanes
Northern Conference Defensive Player of the Year: Steve Navarro - #21 Longhorns
Southern Conference Offensive Player of the Year: Raynald Ray - #47 Ruff Ryders
Southern Conference Defensive Player of the Year: Joey Gonzalez - #3 Wrecking Crew
2006 SFA Regular Season MVP: Leonard Walker - #2 Wrecking Crew

== 2007 TSFA All-Stars ==
The 2007 All-Star Game was held May 22, 2007 at the Holy Cross High School. It ended with the Southern Conference All-Stars defeating the Northern Conference All-Stars in a blowout 31 to 12. The game was sponsored by Westward Environmental and Pampered Chef.

=== Rosters ===
The All-Stars were selected on an appointment basis. Each team received two nominations with the Epler Cup teams each receiving four and the conference championship finalist receiving three.

==== Northern Conference ====
No.	Name	Team
1	Joey Montoya	Panthers
2	Max Kennedy	Longhorns
3	Dontay Evans	Longhorns
4	Mark Escamilla	Bucs
7	George Garza	Bandits
9	Brandon Kyle	Bandits
11	Andre Williams	Gladiators
21	Steve Navarro	Longhorns
22	Daniel Owens	Bandits
32	Eric Martinez	Bandits
41	Vincent Villarreal	Panthers
45	Alan Caudell II	Hurricanes
56	Brandon Sheel	Phoenix
58	Mark Hambrick	Phoenix

==== Southern Conference ====
No.	Name	Team
1	Danny Silva	Bulldawgs
2	Leonard Walker	Wrecking Crew
3	Richard Martinez	Ruff Ryders
4	Joey Gonzales	Wrecking Crew
6	Henry Booth	Wrecking Crew
7	Adrian Harris	Wolverines
8	Vincent Contreras	Texans
10	Mike Herrera	Rhinos
11	Mando Cruz	Wrecking Crew
13	Mario Bustamante	Ruff Ryders
31	Adam Apolinar	Rhinos
47	Raynald Ray	Ruff Ryders
58	Alec Rojas	Wolverines
99	Oscar Valdez	Ruff Ryders
