= LISA Academy North Middle-High School =

LISA Academy North

Location
- 1 LISA Academy Way; North Little Rock, Arkansas 72117; United States
- 34°48′02″N 92°12′47″W

Information
- School type: Public charter
- Opened: 2008 (18 years ago)
- Status: Open
- School district: LISA Foundation
- NCES District ID: 0500399
- Authority: Arkansas Department of Education (ADE)
- Oversight: Arkansas State Board of Education
- CEEB code: 042268
- NCES School ID: 050039901485
- Principal: Emrah Turkmenoglu
- Grades: 6–12
- Enrollment: 650 (2023-24)
- Education system: Charter
- Classes offered: Regular, STEM, Career Focus, Advanced Placement
- Colors: Red and white
- Athletics conference: 1A 5 North (2012–14)
- Sports: Volleyball, golf, basketball, soccer, tennis
- Mascot: Jaguar
- Team name: LISA Academy–NLR Jaguars
- Rival: LISA Academy
- Accreditation: ADE
- Affiliation: Arkansas Activities Association
- Website: lisanorthhigh.lisaacademy.org

LISA Academy North is an open-enrollment public charter high school located in North Little Rock, Arkansas, United States. LISA Academy North Middle High serves students in grades 6 through 12 and is administered by the LISA Academy Charter School.

Since 2008, LISA Academy North has earned the reputation of providing a distinct, high-quality education to students across Arkansas. LISA Academy is a tuition-free public charter school with a comprehensive college preparatory program focusing on Science, Technology, Engineering, and Mathematics. All LISA Academy schools have been accredited by the Arkansas Department of Elementary and Secondary Education since opening.

== Academics ==
As a public charter school, LISA Academy North exceeds the requirements of the Smart Core curriculum developed the Arkansas Department of Education (ADE), which requires students to complete 22 credit units before graduation. Students engage in regular and Advanced Placement (AP) coursework and exams, preparatory courses in ACT/SAT testing, leadership workshops, and partnerships with local colleges and universities. The school's focus is on STEM (science, mathematics, engineering and technology) fields.

== Extracurricular activities ==
The LISA Academy North mascot for academic and athletic team is the Jaguar with school colors of red and white. Basketball has been the most notable sports at LISA North High school with several trophies attributed.

=== Traditions ===
LISA Academy has a tradition of involving parents through monthly activities. The most popular events are Muffins with moms, Doughnuts with Dads, Cookies with Grandparents, Fall Festival, and Car show. Home visits are also scheduled from staff based on the parent availability.

=== Solar Car Engineering ===
LISA Academy North has participated in the Solar Car Challenge competition in Texas Motor Speedway, Fort Worth, Texas since 2017. High School students have designed, built and completed their solar car. They have competed in the Classic and Advanced Classis Divisions. In 2021, the team was awarded 1st place in 2- and 3-D mechanical drawing of the car. LISA North has the only solar car team in the state of Arkansas.

=== Athletics ===
The LISA Academy North Jaguars participate in various interscholastic activities in the 1A 5 North Conference administered by the Arkansas Activities Association. The Jaguars compete in volleyball, golf (boys/girls), basketball (boys), tennis (boys/girls) and soccer (boys/girls).

== See also ==
- LISA Academy
