= TSFL =

TSFL may refer to:

- Tasmanian State Football League, Australian football league
- Texas Sixman Football League, American football league
