= 2002 SFA season =

2002 SFA Season
- League: Texas Sixman Football League
- Teams: 13

Regular Season
- Duration: January 27, 2002 – April 7, 2002
- Weeks: 11

Playoffs
- Dates: April 14, 2002 – April 28, 2002
- Rounds: 3

Epler Cup IV
- Date: May 5, 2002
- Champions: Bandits

The 2002 SFA season was the fourth regular season of the Texas Sixman Football League.

2002 continued the tradition of expansion for the SFA adding 1 new team and bringing in a veteran team under a new banner after losing another.

== Teams ==
The Seminoles and Wolf Pack both returned for their fourth seasons of the SFA. The Mean Machine, Red Raiders and Rhinos continued for their third seasons. The Bandits(previously Sharks), Bucs, Mad Dogs, Rage, Thunder and Wolverines are all in their second year of competition. The Longhorns of the 2000 season re-entered the league as the Outlawz for their second season and the Six-Pack joined for their rookie season.

The Northern Conference consisted of the Bandits, Bucs, Mean Machine, Outlawz, Six-Pack, Thunder and Wolf Pack. The Southern Conference consisted of the Mad Dogs, Rage, Red Raiders, Rhinos, Seminoles and Wolverines.

== Regular season ==
The fourth year of the SFA lasted eleven weeks from January 27, 2002 to April 7, 2002.

=== Week 1 ===
January 27, 2002
Bucs 36 - Rage 22
Six-Pack 38- Rhinos 37
Bandits 42 - Raiders 26
Seminoles 20 - Thunder 6
Wolf Pack 34 - Wolverines 24
Mean Machine 31 - Outlawz 19

=== Week 2 ===
February 3, 2002
Bandits 27 - Rage 6
Rhinos 30 - Thunder 24
Wolverines 14 - Bucs 10
Mad Dogs 35 - Raiders 6
Wolf Pack 33 - Seminoles 19
Mean Machine 35 - Six-Pack 18

=== Week 3 ===
February 10, 2002
Mad Dogs 24 - Rage 22
Bucs 46 - Seminoles 20
Wolf Pack 34 - Rhinos 13
Outlawz 21 - Six-Pack 14
Bandits 34 - Wolverines 20
Mean Machine 38 - Thunder 14

=== Week 4 ===
February 17, 2002
Rhinos 51 - Raiders 6
Bucs 30 - Six-Pack 24
Bandits 18 - Outlawz 12
Wolf Pack 33 - Thunder 6
Rage 1(8) - Seminoles 0(32)
Mean Machine 34 - Mad Dogs 27

=== Week 5 ===
February 24, 2002
Rhinos 28 - Bucs 18
Rage 20 - Raiders 15
Outlawz 40 - Thunder 33
Bandits 46 - Seminoles 0
Mad Dogs 40 - Wolverines 28
Mean Machine 18 - Wolf Pack 14

=== Week 6 ===
March 3, 2002
Wolf Pack 13 - Rage 8
Bandits 33 - Rhinos 6
Mad Dogs 53 - Outlawz 47
Raiders 43 - Bucs 37 (4OT)
Seminoles 30 - Six-Pack 19
Wolverines 32 - Thunder 30

=== Week 7 ===
March 10, 2002
Outlawz 31 - Rage 0
Mad Dogs 1 - Thunder 0
Seminoles 31 - Rhinos 25
Raiders 26 - Six-Pack 12
Bandits 21 - Wolf Pack 6
Mean Machine 32 - Wolverines 12

=== Week 8 ===
March 17, 2002
Rhinos 8 - Rage 6
Thunder 40 - Bucs 0
Outlawz 41 - Mad Dogs 39
Bandits 31 - Six-Pack 20
Wolverines 30 - Seminoles 7
Mean Machine 33 - Raiders 27

=== Week 9 ===
March 24, 2002
Outlawz 40 - Raiders 0
Wolf Pack 19 - Bucs 18
Bandits 38 - Thunder 22
Mean Machine 33 - Rage 8
Mad Dogs 51 - Six-Pack 6
Rhinos 37 - Wolverines 12

=== Week 10 ===
March 31, 2002
Outlawz 54 - Bucs 6
Mad Dogs 31 - Rhinos 6
Wolverines 25 - Rage 14
Raiders 20 - Seminoles 7
Wolf Pack 19 - Six-Pack 6
Bandits 45 - Mean Machine 33

=== Week 11 ===
April 7, 2002
Six-Pack 18 - Thunder 18
Outlawz 22 - Wolf Pack 12
Mad Dogs 32 - Seminoles 0
Mean Machine 44 - Bucs 25
Wolverines 25 - Raiders 14

== Playoffs ==
The fourth year of playoffs for the SFA consisted of the top 4 from the Southern Conference making the playoffs again with the top 5 from the Northern Conference making it with the two bottom seeds playing each other in a "Wild-Card" round.

=== Wildcard Round ===
April 14, 2002
Bucs 26 - Wolf Pack 19

=== Conference Semi-Finals ===
April 21, 2002
Bandits 45 – Bucs 0
Outlawz 47 - Mean Machine 0
Wolverines 34 - Rhinos 26
Mad Dogs 33 - Raiders 8

=== Conference Championships ===
April 28, 2002
Bandits 24 – Outlawz 20
Mad Dogs 20 – Wolverines 13

== Epler Cup IV ==
May 5, 2002
Bandits 34 - Mad Dogs 27
