= 2004 SASFA season =

2004 SASFA Season
- League: Texas Sixman Football League
- Location: Rodriguez Park
- Teams: 12

Regular Season
- Duration: January 25, 2004 – April 18, 2004
- Weeks: 11

Playoffs
- Dates: April 25, 2004 – May 2, 2004
- Rounds: 2

Epler Cup VI
- Date: May 9, 2004
- Champions: Bandits

Post Season Awards
- MVP: Stacey Green - #24 RB Mad Dogs

The 2004 SASFA season was the sixth regular season of the Texas Sixman Football League.

The biggest change for the SFA was new commissioner Frank Rios taking over the league and renaming it to the San Antonio Sixman Football Association because of a sister league to open up in Austin, TX that subsequently fell through. 2004 was the second straight season that the league did not expand with the only change being the Outlawz went back to their original moniker the Longhorns.

== Teams ==
The Seminoles and Wolf Pack both returned for their sixth consecutive seasons of SFA football. The Mean Machine, Red Raiders and Rhinos continued for their fifth seasons. The Bandits, Bucs, Longhorns(renamed from the Outlawz), Mad Dogs, Rage and Wolverines are all in their fourth year of competition. The Six-Pack entered into their third season of play.

The Northern Conference consisted of the Bandits, Bucs, Longhorns, Mean Machine, Six-Pack and Wolf Pack. The Southern Conference consisted of the Mad Dogs, Rage, Red Raiders, Rhinos, Seminoles and Wolverines.

== Regular season ==
The sixth year of the SASFA lasted eleven weeks from January 25, 2004 to April 18, 2004.

=== Week 1 ===
January 22, 2004
Six-Pack 28 - Seminoles 20
Mad Dogs 33 - Rage 22
Bandits 32 - Raiders 7
Mean Machine 28 - Bucs 20
Rhinos 28 - Wolf Pack 27
Longhorns 41 - Wolverines 24

=== Week 2 ===
February 8, 2004
Mean Machine 12 - Six Pack 6
Bandits 41 - Seminoles 20
Rage 44 - Raiders 7
Mad Dogs 33 - Rhinos 30
Longhorns 39 - Bucs 30
Wolverines 33 - Wolf Pack 31

=== Week 3 ===
February 15, 2003\4
Rage 46 - Seminoles 22
Mad Dogs 38 - Wolverines 16
Longhorns 44 - Wolf Pack 31
Six Pack 39 - Bucs 32
Rhinos 12 - Raiders 0
Bandits 38 - Mean Machine 7

=== Week 4 ===
February 22, 2004
Bucs 46 - Wolf Pack 7
Bandits 40 - Six Pack 19
Longhorns 52 - Mad Dogs 32
Rage 40 - Mean Machine 14
Wolverines 24 - Raiders 25
Rhinos 48 - Seminoles 21

=== Week 5 ===
February 29, 2004
Mad Dogs 53 - Wolf Pack 19
Longhorns 57 - Raiders 14
Bandits 53 - Bucs 6
Rage 57 - Six Pack 18
Wolverines 39 - Seminoles 32
Rhinos 35 - Mean Machine 19

=== Week 6 ===
March 7, 2004
Longhorns 32 - Seminoles 27
Rage 28 - Bandits 14
Mean Machine 25 - Wolverines 14
Six Pack 16 - Rhinos 8
Bucs 27 - Mad Dogs 14
Raiders 31 - Wolf Pack 27

=== Week 7 ===
March 14, 2004
Mad Dogs 52 - Raiders 20
Wolf Pack 39 - Seminoles 13
Rhinos 2 - Bandits 0
Longhorns 32 - Mean Machine 30
Six Pack 32 - Wolverines 14
Bucs 2 - Rage 0

=== Week 8 ===
March 21, 2004
Wolverines 32 - Bandits 19
Longhorns 36 - Six Pack 20
Bucs 27 - Raiders 19
Rage 46 - Rhinos 38
Mean Machine 32 - Wolf Pack 0
Mad Dogs 42 - Seminoles 0

=== Week 9 ===
March 28, 2004
Bandits 14 - Longhorns 8
Rage 20 - Wolverines 18
Mean Machine 18 - Mad Dogs 12
Rhinos 36 - Bucs 34
Raiders 21 - Seminoles 14
Six Pack 12 - Wolf Pack 0

=== Week 10 ===
April 4, 2004
Bandits 30 - Wolf Pack 0
Mad Dogs 46 - Six Pack 7
Rage 58 - Longhorns 28
Raiders 31 - Mean Machine 26
Bucs 1 - Seminoles 0
Rhinos 41 - Wolverines 0

=== Week 11 ===
April 18, 2004
Raiders 35 - Six Pack 33
Rage 42 - Wolf Pack 0
Bandits 44 - Mad Dogs 43
Wolverines 37 - Bucs 32
Longhorns 30 - Rhinos 22
Mean Machine 1 - Seminoles 0

== Playoffs ==
The sixth year of playoffs for the SFA consisted of the top 4 from each conference making the playoffs again.

=== Conference Semi-Finals ===
April 25, 2004
Bandits 42 – Mean Machine 18
Longhorns 50 - Six-Pack 18
Rage 29 - Raiders 24
Mad Dogs 31 - Rhinos 22

=== Conference Championships ===
May 2, 2004
Bandits 36 – Longhorns 8
Mad Dogs 33 – Rage 28

== Epler Cup VI ==
May 9, 2004
Bandits 25 - Mad Dogs 13

== Regular season awards ==
SFA Regular Season MVP: Stacey Green - #24 RB Mad Dogs
