= 2000 SFA season =

2000 SFA Season
- League: Texas Sixman Football League
- Teams: 8

Regular Season
- Duration: February 13, 2000 – April 16, 2000
- Weeks: 10

Playoffs
- Dates: April 30, 2000 – May 7, 2000
- Rounds: 2

Epler Cup II
- Date: May 21, 2000
- Champions: Wolf Pack
- MVP: Pedro Veras QB - Wolf Pack

The 2000 SFA season was the second regular season of the Texas Sixman Football League.

2000 was the first year that the SFA had two separate conferences. Now you had the Northern Conference and Southern Conference.

== Teams ==
The Seminoles, Wolf Pack and Vipers all returned for their second seasons of the SFA. The Bobcats, Longhorns, Mean Machine, Red Raiders and Rhinos are all in their first year of competition.

The Northern Conference consisted of the Mean Machine, Rhinos, Wolf Pack and Vipers. The Southern Conference consisted of the Bobcats, Longhorns, Red Raiders and Seminoles.

== Regular season ==
The second year of the SFA consisted of ten weeks from February 13, 2000 to May 21, 2000.

=== Week 1 ===
February 13, 2000
Longhorns 26 - Wolf pack 18
Seminoles 47 - Vipers 0
Rhinos 32 - Raiders 18
Bobcats 38 - Mean Machine 18

=== Week 2 ===
February 20, 2000
Mean Machine 28 - Raiders 24
Bobcats 38 - Rhinos 19
Longhorns 54 - Vipers 6
Wolf Pack 33 - Seminoles 30

=== Week 3 ===
February 27, 2000
Bobcats 36 - Vipers 24
Seminoles 53 - Rhinos 6
Red Raiders 38 - Wolf Pack 37
Longhorns 29 - Mean Machine 25

=== Week 4 ===
March 5, 2000
Seminoles 34 - Mean Machine 24
Raiders 37 - Vipers 0
Wolf Pack 37 - Bobcats 6
Longhorns 32 - Rhinos 19

=== Week 5 ===
March 12, 2000
Mean Machine 59 - Rhinos 26
Raiders 32 - Bobcats 12
Seminoles 51 - Longhorns 7
Wolf Pack 48 - Vipers 26

=== Week 6 ===
March 19, 2000
Wolf Pack 48 - Rhinos 12
Mean Machine 60 - Vipers 50
Seminoles 45 - Bobcats 0
Raiders 26 - Longhorns 13

=== Week 7 ===
March 26, 2000
Seminoles 45 - Raiders 26
Rhinos 24 - Vipers 19
Longhorns 46 - Bobcats 20
Wolf Pack 24 - Mean Machine 20

=== Week 8 ===
April 2, 2000
Seminoles 32 - Longhorns 14
Vipers 39 - Wolf Pack 28
Raiders 38 - Bobcats 20
Mean Machine 32 - Rhinos 12

=== Week 9 ===
April 9, 2000
Mean Machine 40 - Vipers 26
Raiders 38 - Longhorns 20
Wolf Pack 40 - Rhinos 24
Seminoles 53 - Bobcats 6

=== Week 10 ===
April 16, 2000
Longhorns 33 - Bobcats 25
Seminoles 34 - Raiders 33
Vipers 33 - Rhinos 14
Wolf Pack 51 - Mean Machine 33

== Playoffs ==
The second year of playoffs for the SFA consisted of the top 3 from each conference making the playoffs with the top seeds getting a first round bye.

=== Wildcard Round ===
April 30, 2000
Longhorns 45 - Red Raiders 28
Mean Machine 46 - Vipers 38

=== Conference Championships ===
May 7, 2000
Longhorns 40 - Seminoles 14
Wolf Pack 62 - Mean Machine 46

== Epler Cup II ==
May 21, 2000
Wolf Pack 46 - Longhorns 40
Epler Cup II MVP
Pedro Veras QB - Wolf Pack
