= 2006 TSFA season =

2006 TSFA Season
- League: Texas Sixman Football League
- Location: Judson High School
- Teams: 15

Regular Season
- Duration: February 12, 2006 – April 30, 2006
- Weeks: 10

Playoffs
- Dates: May 7, 2006 – May 21, 2006
- Rounds: 3

Epler Cup VIII
- Date: May 28, 2006
- Champions: Ruff Ryders
- MVP: Chris Jones - #42 DB Ruff Ryders

All-star game
- Date: June 11, 2006
- Score: South 18 - North 6

Post Season Awards
- MVP: Scott Kissee - #10 Ruff Ryders
- North Offensive POY: George Garza - #7 Bandits
- North Defensive POY: Mike Soriano - #2 Hurricanes
- South Offensive POY: Andre Williams - #11 Gladiators
- South Defensive POY: Chris Jones - #42 Ruff Ryders
- President's Award: Alan Caudell II & Alex Alcala

The 2006 TSFA season was the eighth regular season of the Texas Sixman Football League.

2006 brought another name change to the Texas Sixman Football Association (TSFA). The reason for this change was the creation of a sister league in Tampa, FL named the Florida Sixman Football Association (FSFA). There was also a large turnover from 2005 with four teams leaving the league and being replaced promptly by other teams.

== Teams ==
The last remaining original team of the SFA folded prior to the 2006 season. The Red Raiders and Rhinos continued for their seventh seasons. The Bandits, Bucs, Longhorns, Rage and Wolverines entered their sixth year of competition. The Six-Pack entered into their fifth season of play. The Hurricanes, Ruff Ryders and Wrecking Crew returned for their second seasons. The Punishers folded after one season the most of their players went to the Panthers. A large number of Mad Dogs players went over and helped jump-start the Gladiators while the Warriors and Jets joined the league.

The Northern Conference consisted of the Bandits, Bucs, Hurricanes, Jets, Longhorns, Panthers, Six-Pack and Warriors. The Southern Conference consisted of the Gladiators, Rage, Red Raiders, Rhinos, Ruff Ryders, Wolverines and Wrecking Crew.
