= 2001 SFA season =

2001 SFA Season
- League: Texas Sixman Football League
- Teams: 12

Regular Season
- Duration: February 4, 2001 – April 8, 2001
- Weeks: 10

Playoffs
- Dates: April 22, 2001 – April 29, 2001
- Rounds: 2

Epler Cup III
- Date: May 6, 2001
- Champions: Rhinos

The 2001 SFA season was the third regular season of the Texas Sixman Football League.

2001 saw the conference setup continue and also the first time in league history that a team with a losing regular season record made the championship and won it.

== Teams ==
The Seminoles, Wolf Pack and Vipers all returned for their third seasons of the SFA. The Mean Machine, Red Raiders and Rhinos continued for their second seasons. The Bucs, Mad Dogs, Rage, Sharks, Thunder and Wolverines are all in their first year of competition. The Rhinos switched from the North to the South prior to the season's start.

The Northern Conference consisted of the Bucs, Mean Machine, Sharks, Thunder, Wolf Pack and Vipers. The Southern Conference consisted of the Mad Dogs, Rage, Red Raiders, Rhinos, Seminoles and Wolverines.

== Regular season ==
The 2001 season of the SFA consisted of ten weeks from February 4, 2000, to April 8, 2000.

=== Week 1 ===
February 4, 2001
Vipers 38 - Rage 12
Sharks 37 - Rhinos 14
Bucs 40 - Red Raiders 6
Thunder 35 - Seminoles 16
Mad Dogs 32 - Wolf Pack 28
Mean Machine 34 - Wolverines 33

=== Week 2 ===
February 11, 2001
Bucs 48 - Rage 0
Sharks 47 - Mad Dogs 7
Rhinos 29 - Thunder 26
Seminoles 18 - Vipers 12
Wolf Pack 36 - Wolverines 31
Mean Machine 28 - Red Raiders 19

=== Week 3 ===
February 18, 2001
Vipers 41 - Rhinos 40
Bucs 36 - Seminoles 18
Mad Dogs 44 - Thunder 26
Sharks 40 - Wolverines 0
Mean Machine 48 - Rage 20
Wolf Pack 52 - Red Raiders 6

=== Week 4 ===
February 25, 2001
Rhinos 25 - Bucs 20
Wolf Pack 45 - Rage 0
Vipers 32 - Mad Dogs 13
Sharks 31 - Red Raiders 0
Wolverines 36 - Thunder 12
Mean Machine 39 - Seminoles 27

=== Week 5 ===
March 4, 2001
Sharks 46 - Rage 0
Bucs 20 - Mad Dogs 19
Wolverines 32 - Vipers 26
Wolf Pack 48 - Seminoles 0
Thunder 44 - Red Raiders 21
Mean Machine 37 - Rhinos 36

=== Week 6 ===
March 11, 2001
Rhinos 12 - Rage 0
Bucs 32 - Thunder 12
Sharks 21 - Wolf Pack 7
Mean Machine 52 - Vipers 7
Seminoles 14 - Wolverines 6
Mad Dogs 25 - Red Raiders 12

=== Week 7 ===
March 18, 2001
Bucs 32 - Wolf Pack 2
Thunder 32 - Vipers 0
Seminoles 15 - Rage 12
Mad Dogs 20 - Rhinos 12
Mean Machine 15 - Sharks 0
Wolverines 25 - Red Raiders 24

=== Week 8 ===
March 25, 2001
Bucs 65 - Vipers 14
Sharks 30 - Thunder 7
Wolverines 45 - Rage 0
Seminoles 44 - Mad Dogs 0
Rhinos 21 - Red Raiders 19
Mean Machine 32 - Wolf Pack 25

=== Week 9 ===
April 1, 2001
Sharks 52 - Vipers 12
Seminoles 26 - Rhinos 8
Rage 27 - Red Raiders 0
Mean Machine 36 - Bucs 28
Wolf Pack 26 - Thunder 19
Wolverines 34 - Mad Dogs 13

=== Week 10 ===
April 8, 2001
Sharks 31 - Bucs 0
Mad Dogs 37 - Rage 8
Wolf Pack 48 - Vipers 0
Wolverines 40 - Rhinos 30
Mean Machine 27 - Thunder 26
Seminoles 41 - Red Raiders 12

== Playoffs ==
The third year of playoffs for the SFA consisted of the top 4 from each conference making the playoffs.

=== Conference Semi-Finals ===
April 22, 2001
Sharks 26 – Bucs 6
Mean Machine 47 – Wolf Pack 39
Mad Dogs 45 – Wolverines 39
Rhinos 29 – Seminoles 19

=== Conference Championships ===
April 29, 2001
Sharks 26 – Mean Machine 20
Rhinos 48 – Mad Dogs 33

== Epler Cup II ==
May 6, 2001
Rhinos 28 – Sharks 24
