= 2003 SFA season =

2003 SFA Season
- League: Texas Sixman Football League
- Teams: 12

Regular Season
- Duration: February 2, 2003 – April 3, 2003
- Weeks: 11

Playoffs
- Dates: April 27, 2003 – May 4, 2003
- Rounds: 2

Epler Cup V
- Date: May 11, 2003
- Champions: Bandits

The 2003 SFA season was the fifth regular season of the Texas Sixman Football League.

2003 was the first season that the league did not expand, in fact they lost a team dropping them down to twelve.

== Teams ==
The Seminoles and Wolf Pack both returned for their fifth seasons of the SFA. The Mean Machine, Red Raiders and Rhinos continued for their fourth seasons. The Bandits, Bucs, Mad Dogs, Outlawz, Rage and Wolverines are all in their third year of competition. The Six-Pack entered into their second season of play.

The Northern Conference consisted of the Bandits, Bucs, Mean Machine, Outlawz, Six-Pack and Wolf Pack. The Southern Conference consisted of the Mad Dogs, Rage, Red Raiders, Rhinos, Seminoles and Wolverines for the third straight season.

== Regular season ==
The fifth year of the SFA lasted eleven weeks from February 2, 2003 - April 3, 2003.

=== Week 1 ===
February 2, 2003
Bandits 44 - Bucs 15
Rage 30 - Mad Dogs 18
Rhinos 20 - Six-Pack 12
Raiders 21 - Wolf Pack 7
Outlawz 25 - Seminoles 0
Mean Machine 41 - Wolverines 24

=== Week 2 ===
February 9, 2003
Rage 26 - Raiders 0
Outlawz 46 - Bucs 18
Mad Dogs 19 - Rhinos 6
Wolf Pack 14 - Seminoles 6
Six-Pack 20 - Wolverines 0
Bandits 38 - Mean Machine 18

=== Week 3 ===
February 16, 2003
Bucs 12 - Wolf Pack 9
Rhinos 14 - Raiders 12
Rage 26 - Seminoles 25
Outlawz 37 - Bandits 32
Mad Dogs 24 - Wolverines 20
Six-Pack 22 - Mean Machine 19

=== Week 4 ===
February 23, 2003
Rage 38 - Bucs 31
Bandits 39 - Six-Pack 0
Rhinos 20 - Seminoles 0
Outlawz 29 - Wolf Pack 24
Raiders 40 - Wolverines 25
Mean Machine 26 - Mad Dogs 20

=== Week 5 ===
March 2, 2003
Bucs 27 - Rhinos 22
Outlawz 33 - Rage 22
Six-Pack 20 - Mad Dogs 6
Bandits 39 - Wolf Pack 18
Seminoles 14 - Wolverines 12
Mean Machine 32 - Raiders 24

=== Week 6 ===
March 9, 2003
Outlawz 46 - Rhinos 35
Rage 38 - Wolf Pack 20
Bucs 50 - Wolverines 20
Six-Pack 22 - Raiders 14
Bandits 57 - Mad Dogs 18
Seminoles 25 - Mean Machine 20

=== Week 7 ===
March 16, 2003
Bandits 18 - Rage 14
Rhinos 26 - Wolf Pack 8
Raiders 33 - Mad Dogs 25
Bucs 27 - Mean Machine 19
Six-Pack 34 - Seminoles 20
Outlawz 39 - Wolverines 25

=== Week 8 ===
March 23, 2003
Rage 16 - Rhinos 14
Six-Pack 20 - Bucs 19
Bandits 19 - Raiders 0
Mad Dogs 33 - Seminoles 27
Wolverines 45 - Wolf Pack 18
Outlawz 27 - Mean Machine 25

=== Week 9 ===
March 30, 2003
Bandits 46 - Rhinos 0
Bucs 40 - Mad Dogs 14
Rage 36 - Wolverines 32
Outlawz 32 - Six-Pack 24
Seminoles 19 - Raiders 14
Mean Machine 47 - Wolf Pack 21

=== Week 10 ===
April 6, 2003
Bucs 34 - Raiders 25
Bandits 27 - Seminoles 13
Wolverines 31 - Rhinos 28
Six-Pack 27 - Wolf Pack 18
Outlawz 42 - Mad Dogs 12
Rage 36 - Mean Machine 14

=== Week 11 ===
April 13, 2003
Bucs 34 - Seminoles 21
Outlawz 48 - Raiders 26
Bandits 51 - Wolverines 20
Rage 50 - Six-Pack 48 3OTs
Wolf Pack 28 - Mad Dogs 12
Mean Machine 25 - Rhinos 20

== Playoffs ==
The fifth year of playoffs for the SFA consisted of the top 4 from each conference making the playoffs again.

=== Conference Semi-Finals ===
April 27, 2003
Bandits 20 – Six-Pack 7
Outlawz 41 - Bucs 30
Rage 36 - Seminoles 20
Mad Dogs 13 - Rhinos 6

=== Conference Championships ===
May 4, 2003
Bandits 33 – Outlawz 30
Rage 42 – Mad Dogs 19

== Epler Cup IV ==
May 11, 2003
Bandits 52 - Rage 36
