= 2010 TSFA season =

Texas football league season

2010 TSFA Season
- League: Texas Sixman Football League
- Teams: 9

Regular Season
- Duration: February 14, 2010 – May 2, 2010
- Weeks: 9

Playoffs
- Dates: May 8, 2010 – May 16, 2010
- Rounds: 2

Epler Cup XII
- Date: May 22, 2010
- Champions: Wolverines
- MVP: Andre Williams - #11 WR/DB Wolverines

Post Season Awards
- MVP: Henry "Silk" Booth - #9 Renegades
- Offensive POY: Snoop Marshall - #11 Renegades
- Defensive POY: Abe Vargas - #5 Renegades

The 2010 TSFA season was the 12th regular season of the Texas Sixman Football League.

== Teams ==
With the folding of the Rhinos the Longhorns and Wolverines took the crown as most tenured teams entering their tenth years of competition. The Bucs returned for their ninth season. The Wrecking Crew returned for their sixth season. The Bulldawgs and Phoenix returned for their fourth seasons. The Renegades and Outlawz entered their second seasons of play and the Tigers came in for their first.

== Regular season ==
The twelfth year of the TSFA consisted of nine weeks from February 14, 2010 to May 2, 2010.

=== Week 1 ===
February 14, 2010
Bulldawgs 34 – Longhorns 0
Wolverines 23 – Bucs 22
Renegades 33 – Phoenix 20
Outlawz 24 – Wrecking Crew 12

=== Week 2 ===
February 21, 2010
Tigers 26 – Bucs 24
Renegades 45 – Outlawz 6
Wrecking Crew 25 – Phoenix 24
Wolverines 34 – Bulldawgs 33

=== Week 3 ===
February 28, 2010
Wolverines 30 – Outlawz 22
Wrecking Crew 32 – Longhorns 26
Renegades 33 – Bulldawgs 19
Tigers 32- Phoenix 9

=== Week 4 ===
March 14, 2010
Renegades 34 – Longhorns 0
Bulldawgs 28 – Tigers 20
Phoenix 27 – Bucs 22
Wolverines 64 – Wrecking Crew 27

=== Week 5 ===
March 21, 2010
Outlawz 28 – Bucs 7
Wolverines 26 – Longhorns 6
Renegades 24 – Tigers 7
Bulldawgs 25 – Wrecking Crew 19

=== Week 6 ===
March 28, 2010
Bulldawgs 41 – Phoenix 0
Tigers 18 – Outlawz 7
Longhorns 32 – Bucs 6
Renegades 44 – Wolverines 14

=== Week 7 ===
April 3, 2010
Wolverines 30 – Tigers 13
Longhorns 26 – Phoenix 19
Bulldawgs 44 – Outlawz 38
Wrecking Crew 39 – Bucs 19

=== Week 8 ===
April 25, 2010
Renegades 38 – Wrecking Crew 13
Phoenix 27 – Outlawz 19
Bulldawgs 50 – Bucs 27
Longhorns 46 – Tigers 14

=== Week 9 ===
May 2, 2010
Phoenix 45 – Wolverines 40
Renegades 31 – Bucs 27
Tigers 12 – Wrecking Crew 6
Longhorns 34 – Outlawz 25

== Playoffs ==
The twelfth year of playoffs for the TSFA consisted of the top 6 from the league entering the post season with the top 2 seeds getting a bye week.

=== Wildcard Round ===
May 8, 2011
Longhorns 19 – Tigers 13
Bulldawgs 45 – Wrecking Crew 25

=== Conference Championships ===
May 16, 2010
Wolverines 24 – Bulldawgs 14
Renegades 32 – Longhorns 19

== Epler Cup XII ==
May 22, 2010
Wolverines 36 – Renegades 25
Epler Cup XII MVP
Andre Williams - #11 WR/DB Wolverines

== Regular season awards ==
Offensive Player of the Year: Snoop Marshall - #11 Renegades
Defensive Player of the Year: Abe Vargas - #5 Renegades
2009 TSFA Regular Season MVP: Henry "Silk" Booth - #9 Renegades
