= 1999 SFA season =

1999 SFA Season
- League: Texas Sixman Football League
- Teams: 4

Regular Season
- Duration: March 13, 1999 - April 30, 1999
- Weeks: 7

Playoffs
- Date: May 2, 1999
- Rounds: 1

Epler Cup I
- Date: May 16, 1999
- Champions: Wolf Pack
- MVP: David McNeil - RB Wolf Pack

Post Season Awards
- MVP: Ray Garcia - Seminoles
- Offensive POY: Chris Jones - #3 Wolf Pack
- Defensive POY: Oscar Valdez - #99 Seminoles

The 1999 SFA season was the first regular season of the Texas Sixman Football League.

== Teams ==
Damage, Inc., Seminoles', Wolf Pack and Vipers are all in their first year of competition.

== Regular season ==
The first year of the SFA consisted of seven weeks from March 13, 1999, to April 30, 1999.

=== Week 1 ===
March 13, 1999
Vipers 21 - Damage Inc. 12
Seminoles 33 - Wolf Pack 30

=== Week 2 ===
March 20, 1999
Seminoles 38 - Damage Inc. 8
Wolf Pack 20 - Vipers 19

=== Week 3 ===
March 27, 1999
Wolf Pack 20 - Damage Inc. 0
Seminoles 45 - Vipers 0

=== Week 4 ===
April 10, 1999
Seminoles 33 - Wolf Pack 20
Damage Inc. 25 - Vipers 19

=== Week 5 ===
April 17, 1999
Seminoles 32 - Damage Inc.0
Wolf Pack 50 - Vipers 0

=== Week 6 ===
April 24, 1999
Seminoles 39 - Vipers 6
Wolf Pack 30 - Damage Inc. 7

=== Week 7 ===
April 30, 1999
Seminoles 39 - Wolf Pack 6
Damage Inc. 40 - Vipers 36

== Playoffs ==
The first year of playoffs for the SFA consisted of all the teams making it with 1 round of play before the Epler Cup championship game.

=== Round 1 ===
May 2, 1999
Wolf Pack 34 - Damage Inc. 18
Seminoles 1 - Vipers 0 (Forfeit)

== Epler Cup I ==
May 16, 1999
Wolf Pack 43 - Seminoles 36

Epler Cup I MVP
David McNeil - RB Wolf Pack

== Regular Season Awards ==
SFA Offensive Player of the Year: Chris Jones - #3 Wolf Pack
SFA Defensive Player of the Year: Oscar Valdez - #99 Seminoles
SFA Regular Season MVP: Ray Garcia - Seminoles

== All-SFA Team ==
=== 1st Team ===
==== Offense ====
QB: Ray Garcia - Seminoles
WR: Chris Jones - #3 Wolf Pack
WR: Jay - #10 Damage Inc.
C: Fred Garcia - Seminoles
RB: Lydell Bradshaw - #1 Wolf Pack
RB: Angel Marty - Seminoles

==== Defense ====
LB: Sean Berry - #40 Wolf Pack
DE: Rudy Garcia - Seminoles
DE: Santos Fabela - Seminoles
DB: Ronald Gonzalez - Seminoles
DB: Willie Garcia - Seminoles
DB: Marcus Patin - Vipers

=== 2nd Team ===
==== Offense ====
QB: Shane - Damage Inc
C: Ken Torres - #88 Wolf Pack
WR: Eddie Trejo - Seminoles
WR: Manuel Garcia - Seminoles
RB: Mario Reyes - Seminoles
RB: David McNeal - Wolf Pack

==== Defense ====
LB: Oscar Valdez - #99 Seminoles
LB: Lawrence Marion III - #17 Wolf Pack
DE: Nick Valdez - Seminoles
DB: Albert Delgado - #2 Wolf Pack
DB: Thomas Griffen - Vipers
DB: Chris Jones - #3 Wolf Pack
