= 2005 SFA season =

Season of Texas sixman football league

2005 SFA Season
- League: Texas Sixman Football League
- Location: Brooks Park
- Teams: 15

Regular Season
- Duration: January 28, 2005 – May 1, 2005
- Weeks: 12

Playoffs
- Dates: May 8, 2005 – May 22, 2005
- Rounds: 3

Epler Cup VII
- Date: May 29, 2005
- Champions: Bandits
- MVP: George Garza - #7 QB Bandits

Post Season Awards
- MVP: Daniel Potter - #23 Wolf Pack
- North Offensive POY: Daniel Potter - #23 Wolf Pack
- North Defensive POY: Eric Martinez - #32 Bandits
- South Offensive POY: Ray Raynald - #47 Ruff Riders
- South Defensive POY: Roger Riojas - #98 Rage

The 2005 SFA season was the seventh regular season of the Texas Sixman Football League.

2005 saw the most changes to the team roster since 2001 with having one team bought out and have its name changed, one team splitting into three and the addition of another bringing the season total to the highest yet of fifteen teams vying for a championship. The 2005 season was also the longest regular season with 12 weeks of competition.

== Teams ==
The Wolf Pack both returned for their seventh consecutive season of SFA football and being the last remaining original team of the SFA. The Red Raiders and Rhinos continued for their sixth seasons. The Bandits, Bucs, Longhorns, Mad Dogs, Rage and Wolverines are entered their fifth year of competition. The Six-Pack entered into their fourth season of play. Players from the Mean Machine split creating the Hit Squad, Hurricanes and Wrecking Crew. The Seminoles had the rights to their spot bought out and renamed to the Ruff Ryders and the Punishers joined the league.

The Northern Conference consisted of the Bandits, Bucs, Hit Squad, Hurricanes, Longhorns, Six-Pack and Wolf Pack. The Southern Conference consisted of the Mad Dogs, Punishers, Rage, Red Raiders, Rhinos, Ruff Ryders, Wolverines and Wrecking Crew.

== Regular season ==
The seventh year of the SFA lasted twelve weeks from January 28, 2005 to May 1, 2005.

=== Week 1 ===
January 29, 2005
Rage 30 - Wolf Pack 20
Hurricanes 20 - Mad Dogs 19
Bucs 38 - Wolverines 30
Rhinos 27 - Six-Pack 12
Longhorns 18 - Wrecking Crew 12
Ruff Ryders 39 - Hit Squad 20
Bandits 16 - Punishers 12

=== Week 2 ===
February 5, 2005
Wrecking Crew 24 - Hurricanes 0
Longhorns 27 - Mad Dogs 21
Bandits 35 - Wolverines 0
Bucs 18 - Rhinos 16
Hit Squad 40 - Rage 36
Wolf Pack 38 - Ruff Ryders 25
Red Raiders 19 - Six-Pack 12

=== Week 3 ===
February 13, 2005
Red Raiders 39 - Wolf Pack 20
Ruff Ryders 34 - Six-Pack 26
Longhorns 38 - Wolverines 21
Punishers 35 - Hurricanes 34
Rage 32 - Bucs 12
Bandits 37 - Mad Dogs 19
Rhinos 22 - Hit Squad 7

=== Week 4 ===
February 20, 2005
Rage 48 - Hurricanes 0
Ruff Ryders 41 - Longhorns 28
Bandits 26 - Red Raiders 6
Wolf Pack 48 - Punishers 21
Hit Squad 38 - Wrecking Crew 13
Mad Dogs 25 - Bucs 13
Six-Pack 25 - Wolverines 20

=== Week 5 ===
February 26, 2005
Rage 26 - Wolverines 19
Bandits 27 - Hit Squad 20
Red Raiders 21 - Wrecking Crew 6
Six-Pack 39 - Hurricanes 0
Rhinos 7 - Mad Dogs 0
Longhorns 13 - Bucs 12
Ruff Ryders 31 - Punishers 0

=== Week 6 ===
March 13, 2005
Bandits 35 - Six-Pack 19
Hit Squad 45 - Hurricanes 6
Longhorns 52 - Wolf Pack 26
Rhinos 26 - Punishers 15
Wolverines 32 - Red Raiders 26
Rage 32 - Wrecking Crew 30
Ruff Ryders 38 - Mad Dogs 14

=== Week 7 ===
March 26, 2005
Wolf Pack 46 - Bucs 16
Bandits 1 - Hurricanes 0
Hit Squad 39 - Six-Pack 33
Mad Dogs 28 - Punishers 20
Ruff Ryders 27 - Rhinos 8
Wrecking Crew 30 - Wolverines 26
Rage 21 - Red Raiders 20

=== Week 8 ===
April 3, 2005
Hit Squad 35 - Bucs 18
Wolf Pack 40 - Six-Pack 27
Bandits 31 - Longhorns 18
Rage 38 - Rhinos 30
Ruff Ryders 36 - Red Raiders 0
Wrecking Crew 45 - Punishers 26
Mad Dogs 20 - Wolverines 13

=== Week 9 ===
April 10, 2005
Bandits 36 - Bucs 12
Hit Squad 35 - Wolf Pack 19
Longhorns 32 - Hurricanes 6
Rhinos 35 - Wolverines 12
Rage 30 - Ruff Ryders 25
Red Raiders 28 - Punishers 6
Mad Dogs 39 - Wrecking Crew 19

=== Week 10 ===
April 17, 2005
Bandits 38 - Wolf Pack 20
Six-Pack 1 - Longhorns 0
Hurricanes 40 - Bucs 6
Ruff Ryders 58 - Wolverines 12
Wrecking Crew 32 - Rhinos 30
Rage 46 - Punishers 0
Red Raiders 14 - Mad Dogs 6

=== Week 11 ===
April 24, 2005
Six-Pack 1 - Bucs 0
Longhorns 25 - Hit Squad 6
Wolf Pack 40 - Hurricanes 19
Rage 32 - Mad Dogs 12
Ruff Ryders 24 - Wrecking Crew 0
Red Raiders 27 - Rhinos 21
Punishers 26 - Wolverines 19

=== Week 12 ===
May 1, 2005
Bucs 32 - Wrecking Crew 18
Punishers 1 - Wolf Pack 0
Longhorns 13 - Rhinos 12
Six-Pack 47 - Hurricanes 19

== Playoffs ==
The seventh year of playoffs for the SFA consisted of the top 6 from each conference making the playoffs with the top 2 of each conference getting a 1st round bye.

=== Round 1 ===
May 8, 2005
Rhinos 35 - Mad Dogs 24
Wrecking Crew 35 - Red Raiders 24
Wolf Pack 26 - Six-Pack 12
Hit Squad 34 - Hurricanes 25

=== Conference Semi-Finals ===
May 15, 2005
Bandits 53 - Wolf Pack 45
Ruff Ryders 28 - Rhinos 18
Rage 46 - Wrecking Crew 0
Longhorns 32 - Hit Squad 14

=== Conference Championships ===
May 22, 2005
Bandits 26 - Longhorns 6
Ruff Ryders 40 - Rage 24

== Epler Cup VII ==
May 29, 2005
Bandits 40 Ruff Ryders 38

Epler Cup VII MVP
George Garza - #7 QB Bandits

=== Epler Cup VII Summary ===
The Ruff Riders came out strong and took a commanding lead in the first half by going up by two scores. Unfortunately, for the Riders some untimely turnovers did them in, in the second half as the defending champions, led by Epler VII MVP #7 George Garza, converted on the forced turnovers. George Garza, had the game winning score as he leaped over a Ruff Rider tackler and into the endzone. The Ruff Riders could have tied the game but their extra point attempt was no good. The Bandits then took a knee and as the clock expired their claim as the 4 time SFA Epler Cup Champions became a reality. Congratulations, to the Eddie Flores and the Ruff Riders on a great season and congratulations to the Bandits on their 4-peat!

== Regular season awards ==
Northern Conference Offensive Player of the Year: Daniel Potter - #23 Wolf Pack
Northern Conference Defensive Player of the Year: Eric Martinez - #32 Bandits
Southern Conference Offensive Player of the Year: Ray Raynald - #47 Ruff Riders
Southern Conference Defensive Player of the Year: Roger Riojas - #98 Rage
SFA Regular Season MVP: Daniel Potter - #23 Wolf Pack
