= Stan Kelly =

American basketball announcer

Stan Kelly is an American radio news anchor and served as the public address announcer for the San Antonio Spurs of the National Basketball Association from 1990 through 2008. During his time with the Spurs, they won four NBA championships, and became a model NBA franchise.

On October 10, 2008, Kelly was replaced as the Spurs public address announcer by Kevin "Big Kev" Brock. He currently works co host of "San Antonio's First News" on the news/talk radio station WOAI (AM) in San Antonio. He is the former public address announcer for both The University of Texas basketball games and San Antonio Missions Minor League Baseball games.
