= Solar Car Challenge =

Annual solar-powered car race for high school students

Solar Car Challenge
- Venue: Texas Motor Speedway (even years); Cross-country (odd years)
- Location: United States
- First race: 1995

The Solar Car Challenge is an annual solar-powered car race organized in Texas for high school students. The event attracts teams from around the world, but mostly from American high schools. Originating as a class competition held in 1989, the first official race was held in 1995. Each event is the end product of a two-year education cycle organized by the Solar Car Challenge Foundation, a non-profit. The venue of the race typically alternates annually between being cross-country races which start at the Texas Motor Speedway and track races taking place solely at the speedway. Currently, this means that track races take place on even years and cross-country races on odd years, but occasionally consecutive track races are held which disrupt this pattern. Most recently, in July 2025, the race took place around Texas Motor Speedway, with a cross country race across the state of Texas scheduled for July 2026.

== History ==
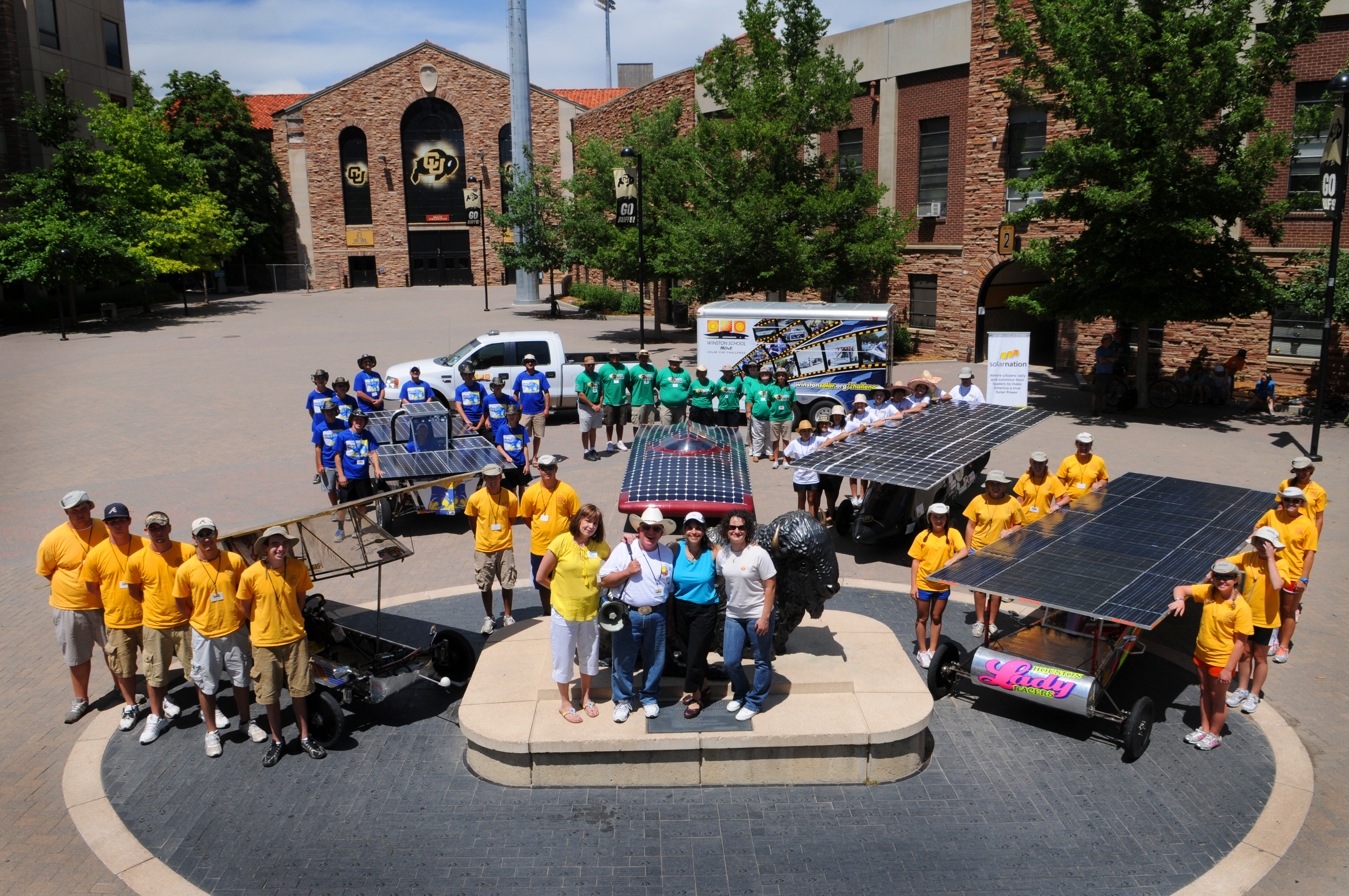
End of the 2010 Cross Country Race at the University of Colorado

=== Founding ===
The Solar Car Challenge is an educational program aimed at engaging high school students in designing, building, and racing solar-powered vehicles. It originated with the Winston Solar Car Team, a student solar car team at The Winston School in Dallas, Texas, led by science teacher Dr. Lehman Marks. Multiple sources report the education program was first established in 1993, with the first official national race held in 1995.

According to Marks, the Solar Car Challenge grew out of his frustration with the state of STEM education in the late 1980s and early 1990s, when he found that his students were disengaged by learning solely from textbooks. Seeking a way to engage them, Marks accepted an invitation from an acquaintance at the University of North Texas who was building a collegiate solar car for a newly established competition; after visiting the project, his students asked to build a solar car of their own.

Dr. Marks has said he concluded that high school students could not fairly compete against college-level solar car teams because of disparities in technical expertise and funding, leading him to design a separate, lower-cost program built around commercially available solar components.

=== Growth and format ===
The annual competition grew from its original classroom setting into a national program. As of 2023, organizers reported that more than 75,000 students had participated since the program's founding, with active teams based in 39 U.S. states and in several other countries, including Canada, Mexico, and Costa Rica. By 2026, organizers reported cumulative participation of approximately 85,000 students.

The event format has alternated between closed-track races at The Texas Motor Speedway and cross-country races that begin there, though the pattern has occasionally been disrupted by consecutive track-only years. In 2023, the program marked its 30th year with an eight-day, approximately 1,400-mile cross-country race from the Texas Motor Speedway in Fort Worth to Palmdale, California — its first cross-country event since 2018 — with participating teams from Texas, Arkansas, California, Kentucky, Maryland, Michigan, Oregon, Washington, and Wisconsin. In July 2025, the program held its 32nd annual event at the Texas Motor Speedway.

Solar cars racing on the track at the Texas Motor Speedway.

=== Media coverage ===
In 2007, the competition was featured in a segment on CNN affiliate KLTV. The Solar Car Challenge was named one of America's 10 most innovative education programs by Business Wire in 2003.

== Organization ==
=== Structure and leadership ===
The Solar Car Challenge is organized by the Solar Car Challenge Foundation, a Texas-based nonprofit recognized by the Internal Revenue Service as a 501(c)(3) educational organization. As of 2026, the Foundation continues to be led by its founder, Dr. Lehman Marks. The Foundation provides participating teams with curriculum materials, workshops, and on-site technical visits over a multi-year education cycle that culminates in a public race.

=== Funding and sponsorship ===
According to the Foundation, the program has been supported by corporate sponsors including Texas Instruments, Siemens, Lockheed Martin, and Motorola Solutions, with sponsors in earlier years having included Oncor, Raytheon, Northrop Grumman, and Dell.

=== Recognition ===
==== NBCUniversal ====
In 2024, the Foundation received an NBCUniversal Local Impact Grant.

==== D CEO Magazine ====
The organization was also recognized in D CEO Magazine's Nonprofit & Corporate Citizenship Awards, in the "Innovation in Education" category.

== See also ==
- Solar car racing
- World Solar Car Challenge
- The Quiet Achiever, the world's first solar-powered racecar
