= The Winston School =

Location
- 5707 Royal Lane; Dallas, Texas 75229; United States; 32.894910°N 96.810275°W

Information
- School type: Private, Coeducational
- Motto: Bright Students who Learn Differently
- Established: 1975
- Head of school: Dr. Jenn Milam
- Faculty: 40
- Teaching staff: 29.3
- Grades: K–12
- Enrollment: 144 (as of 2019–20)
- Average class size: 10
- Student to teacher ratio: 4.9
- Campus size: 4 acres (16,000 m^{2})
- Campus type: Suburban
- Colours: Navy Blue and Dark Red
- Mascot: Eagle
- Endowment: $4.8 million
- Website: http://www.winston-school.org/

The Winston School is a private co-educational day school in Dallas, Texas. The grade K-12 school is for children, who must learn using non-traditional techniques. Established in 1975, the school is named after Sir Winston Churchill and offers individualized curricula for students, with learning differences.

== See also ==
- Dell-Winston School Solar Car Challenge
