= Holy Cross of San Antonio =

Private Catholic school in San Antonio, Texas, US

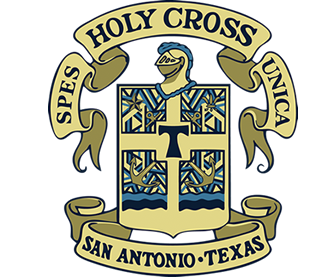

Location
- 426 North San Felipe St. Loma Vista; San Antonio, (Bexar County), Texas 78228; United States; 29°26′26″N 98°33′25″W

Information
- Type: Private, College-prep
- Motto: Spes Unica (Only Hope)
- Religious affiliation: Roman Catholic
- Denomination: Congregation of Holy Cross
- Patron saints: Saint André Bessette, CSC
- Established: 1957
- Area trustee: Bro. Stanley Culotta, C.S.C.
- Principal: Dr. Rene Escobedo
- Chaplain: Bro. Michael Winslow, C.S.C.
- Grades: 6–12
- Gender: Coeducational
- Average class size: 18
- Student to teacher ratio: 14:1
- Campus: Inner City
- Colors: Blue, Green and Gold
- Fight song: "Holy Cross Victory March"
- Athletics conference: TAPPS Class 3A
- Mascot: Knights
- Accreditation: Southern Association of Colleges and Schools
- Newspaper: The Bard
- Yearbook: The Tradition
- Tuition: $9,295 (high school) $6,710 (middle school)
- Academic Dean: Richard Vasquez
- Dean of Men: Angel Cedillo
- Dean of Women: Molly Calderon
- Athletic Director: Mike Harrison
- Website: holycross-sa.socs.net

Holy Cross of San Antonio is a Catholic, coeducational college preparatory secondary school located in the Loma Vista neighborhood of San Antonio, Texas, on the west side of the city, in the Roman Catholic Archdiocese of San Antonio.

== History ==
Holy Cross was opened in 1957 by the Archdiocese of San Antonio. At the suggestion of the Brothers of Holy Cross it was established as a four-year college preparatory school for boys. The first class of 84 boys enrolled as freshmen on September 3, 1957, with a faculty of three Brothers and a chaplain. It was jointly funded by a tuition fee and a subsidy from the Archdiocese. In 1968 the school faced possible closure because of the threatened withdrawal of the Archdiocese subsidy, but the financial issues were resolved, in part by adding grades 7 and 8 so that it became a middle and secondary school. Due to a lack of medical services in the area, in 1981 parents and alumni supported the establishment of Holy Cross Family Medical Center, which was expanded in 1985 and moved to a site across the street from the school, where it remains in operation.

In 1994 the school was incorporated as an independent Catholic school with a board of governors. In 2001 ownership was transferred to Holy Cross Community Services, a non-profit which also owned the medical center. Fundraising remained an issue to keep tuition as low as possible.

In 2002 the last Catholic high school for girls in the area closed. During the following decade the school gradually transitioned to a coeducational student body, becoming fully coed in 2009. The school's trustee, Brother Stanley Culotta, has been managing the school for almost 60 years as of 2017.

== Athletics ==
Holy Cross football has had success in recent years but this success is not without scrutiny. Most recently video surfaced of Holy Cross utilizing voice technology in violation of TAPPS Rules (and rules applicable to all high school programs in the state of Texas). "Holy Cross of San Antonio Utilizes Coach to Player Voice Device". October 5, 2025.

In October 2025, Holy Cross also terminated a coach for secret filming of individuals changing in his office. "SAPD: Ex-Holy Cross HS coach arrested, accused of using secret camera to record people changing in his office".

== Mascot ==
Holy Cross "Knights", named for the English term for a social position. The Fighting Irish ("The Irish") is the mascot of The University of Notre Dame in South Bend, Indiana also a Congregation of Holy Cross Institution.

== Religious life ==
Christian service is an integral part of a Holy Cross education. Because of the importance of Christian service, Holy Cross students are required to serve the community through charitable acts as a requirement for graduation.

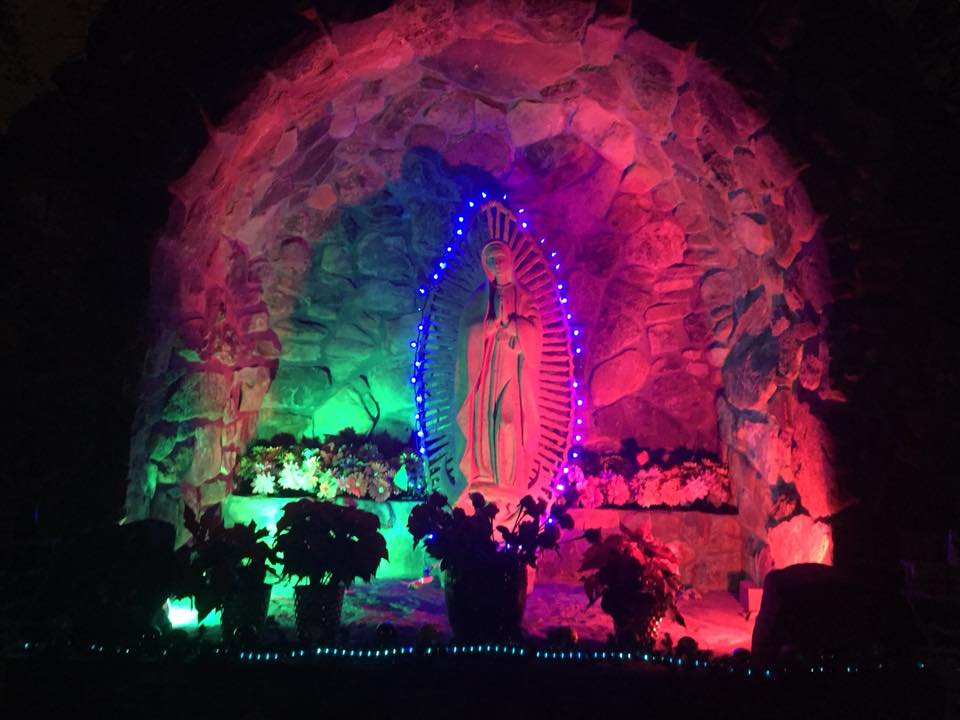
The Grotto to Our Lady of Guadalupe, one of many spiritual places on campus.

== Traditions ==
- The Holy Cross annual alumni softball tournament happens each year on Memorial Day weekend. The double-elimination two-day tournament sets teams by individual graduating classes, with an older division and a younger division.
- In addition to the softball tournament, The alumni basketball tournament is held every year at the end of June in honor of Daniel Gutierrez a graduate of Holy Cross who lost his long battle with Cancer in 2006. Proceeds from this event go to a Scholarship in his name.
- Holy Cross is a historically All-Boys institution therefore The Alumni softball tournament, The alumni basketball tournament and the alumni soccer tournament are largely competed in by male graduates.

== Notable alumni ==
- Emilio M. Garza, judge of the United States Court of Appeals for the Fifth Circuit
- Stan Kelly, public address announcer for the San Antonio Spurs of the National Basketball Association
- Bubba Hernandez, former member of the polka band Brave Combo and Grammy Award winner
- Roger Metzger, shortstop for the Chicago Cubs (1970), Houston Astros (1971–78) and San Francisco Giants (1978–80)
- Robert Santos, statistician
