= John W. Shaver House =

Historic house in Arkansas, United States

- U.S. National Register of Historic Places
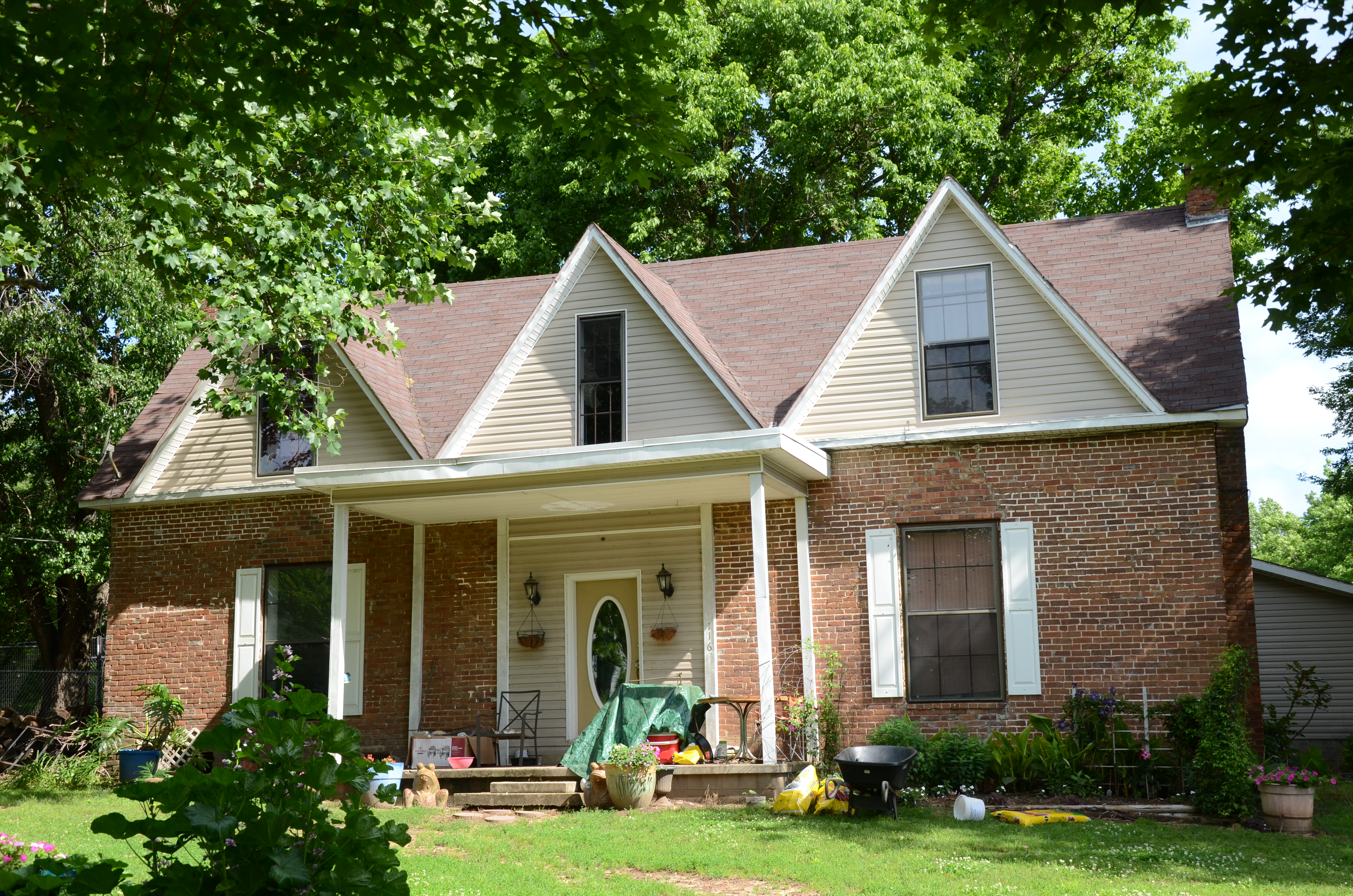

- Location within Arkansas Location within the United States
- Location: Main St., Evening Shade, Arkansas
- Coordinates: 36°4′19″N 91°37′10″W
- Area: less than one acre
- Built: 1854
- MPS: Evening Shade MRA
- NRHP reference No.: 82002140
- Added to NRHP: June 2, 1982

The John W. Shaver House is a historic house at the northwest corner of Main and Cammack Streets in Evening Shade, Arkansas. Built in 1854, it is the oldest house in Evening Shade, and it was built by its first permanent settler and businessman, John W. Shaver. It is a 1 1/2-story brick structure, with a side gable roof that has a series of tall cross-gable dormers (a late 19th-century addition) on the front facade. Shaver arrived in the area in 1844 as a fur trader.

The house was listed on the National Register of Historic Places in 1982.

== See also ==
- Charles W. Shaver House, home of John W. Shaver's son
- National Register of Historic Places listings in Sharp County, Arkansas
