= Charles W. Shaver House =

Historic house in Arkansas, United States

- U.S. National Register of Historic Places
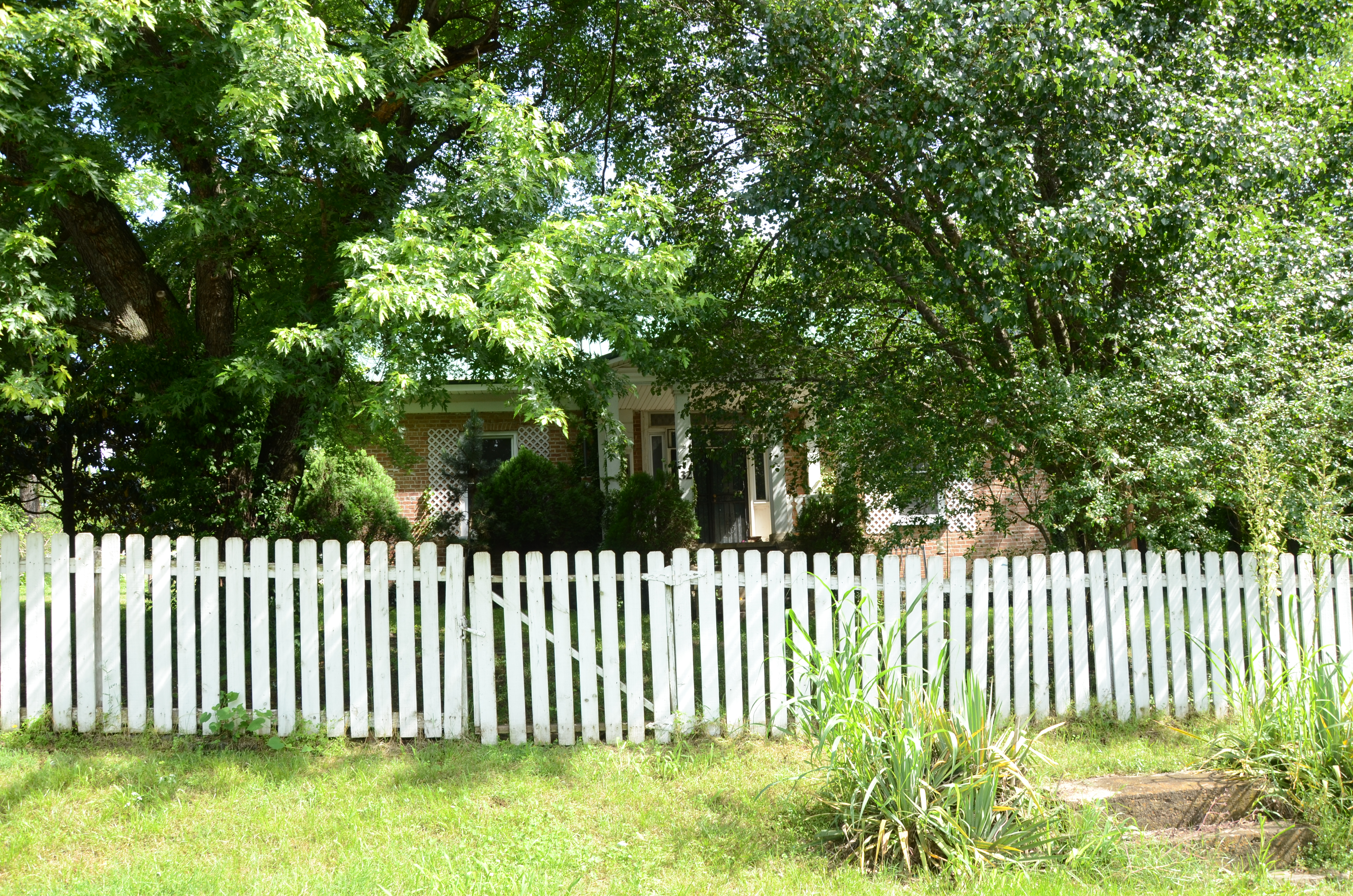

- Location within Arkansas Location within the United States
- Location: Court St., Evening Shade, Arkansas
- Coordinates: 36°4′22″N 91°37′15″W
- Area: less than one acre
- Built: 1874
- MPS: Evening Shade MRA
- NRHP reference No.: 82002139
- Added to NRHP: September 30, 1982

The Charles W. Shaver House is a historic house at the northeast corner of Court and Spring Streets in Evening Shade, Arkansas. It is a single-story brick structure, with an L-shaped configuration that has gable roofs. Built in 1874, it is distinctive as a rare brick 19th century house in the community, and as the home of Charles W. Shaver, a son of one of the city's founders, John W. Shaver. Shaver, despite being a wheelchair user, was a successful local merchant who thrived during the American Civil War, in part by crossing military lines to acquire needed supplies for the community. The use of Greek Revival elements (an entablature and gable end returns, for example) in the house was a trend-setter in later home construction in the community.

The house was listed on the National Register of Historic Places in 1982.

== See also ==
- John W. Shaver House, 1854 home of Charles W. Shaver's father
- National Register of Historic Places listings in Sharp County, Arkansas
