= List of natural disasters in the United States =

NOAA's National Centers for Environmental Information (NCEI) has reported growing numbers of weather and climate-related events costing at least a billion dollars, exceeding the 1980–2019 inflation-adjusted average of 6.6 such events.

This list of United States natural disasters is a list of notable natural disasters that occurred in the United States after 1816. Due to inflation, the monetary damage estimates are not comparable. Unless otherwise noted, the year given is the year in which the currency's valuation was calculated. References can be found in the associated articles noted.

Year	Disaster	Death toll	Damage cost US$	Main article	Location	Notes
2025	Floods	136+		July 2025 Central Texas floods	Central Texas	
2025	Tornado	3	~$875 million*	2025 Enderlin tornado	North Dakota	First EF-5 in 12 years. Rated EF-5 based on forensic analysis of 33 derailed train cars. Occurred on June 20, 2025
2025	Floods	1		May 2025 Mid-Atlantic floods	Maryland, North Carolina, Virginia, West Virginia, Pennsylvania, Washington, DC	
2025	Tornado outbreak	43 total (23 tornadic, 20 non-tornadic)	$6.25 billion	Tornado outbreak of March 14–16, 2025	Southern United States	
2025	Wildfire	27+	~$250 billion	2025 Southern California wildfires	Southern California	Most destructive wildfires in US history.
2024	Hurricane	35	$85 billion	Hurricane Milton	Florida, Georgia	Strongest Hurricane in Gulf of Mexico since 2005
2024	Hurricane	199–241	$120 billion	Hurricane Helene	Florida, Georgia, South Carolina, North Carolina, Tennessee, Virginia, Ohio	Most casualties caused by catastrophic inland flooding in Western North Carolina and surrounding areas.
2024	Hurricane	70 (45 in the US)	>$6.86 billion	Hurricane Beryl	Caribbean, Venezuela, Yucatán Peninsula, United States	Beryl is the earliest category 4 and 5 hurricane in history.
2024	Tornado outbreak	22 (2 indirect, 10 non-tornadic)	$7.3 billion	Tornado outbreak sequence of May 19–27, 2024	Southern United States, Midwestern United States	The Greenfield tornado of this outbreak was measured to have the third highest wind speeds ever recorded on Earth.
2023	Hurricane	7 (+3 indirect)	$2.2-5 billion	Hurricane Idalia	Florida	
2023	Wildfire	110	~$6 billion (as of August 12)	2023 Hawaii wildfires	Hawaii	
2023	Tornado outbreak	33	$4.3 billion	Tornado outbreak of March 31 – April 1, 2023	Southern United States, Midwestern United States	
2023	Tornado outbreak	25	$1.9 billion	Tornado outbreak of March 24–27, 2023	Southern United States	Includes the 2023 Rolling Fork—Silver City tornado.
2023	Flooding and Tornado outbreak	13	$4.5 billion	Early-March 2023 North American storm complex	Southwestern United States, Southeastern United States	
2023	Derecho, Tornado outbreak and Winter storm	14		February 2023 North American storm complex	Western United States, Southern United States and Midwestern United States	
2022	Winter storm	106	$5.4 billion	December 2022 North American winter storm	Western United States, Midwestern United States, Great Lakes region (especially the Buffalo-Niagara Falls metropolitan area), Canada	
2022	Earthquake	2		2022 Ferndale earthquake	North Coast, California, United States	
2022	Winter storm	4		November 2022 Great Lakes winter storm	Great Lakes region (especially the Buffalo-Niagara Falls metropolitan area)	
2022	Hurricane	11	≥ $1 billion	Hurricane Nicole	Dominican Republic, Puerto Rico, The Bahamas, Southeastern United States	Nicole became only the third November hurricane on record to make landfall in Florida, along with the 1935 Yankee hurricane and Hurricane Kate in 1985.
2022	Hurricane	157+	≥ $113.1 billion	Hurricane Ian	Trinidad and Tobago, Venezuela, Colombia, ABC islands, Jamaica, Cayman Islands, Cuba, Southeast United States (especially Florida and The Carolinas)	Hurricane Ian was the deadliest hurricane to strike the state of Florida since the 1935 Labor Day hurricane.
2022	Hurricane	25	≥$5.88 billion	Hurricane Fiona	Puerto Rico	
2022	Flood	44	$1.2 billion (Kentucky and Missouri only)	July–August 2022 United States floods	Greater St. Louis, Central Appalachia, Southern and Southwestern United States	
2022	Flood	1	$29 million	2022 Montana floods	Montana	
2022	Tornado outbreak	3	$1.3 billion	Tornado outbreak of April 4–7, 2022	Southern United States, Midwestern United States, Eastern United States	
2022	Tornado outbreak	3	$1.3 billion	Tornado outbreak of March 29–31, 2022	Southern United States, Midwestern United States, Eastern United States	
2022	Tornado outbreak	7	$48.943 million	Tornado outbreak of March 21–23, 2022	Southern United States, Eastern United States	
2022	Tornado outbreak	9	$1 billion	Tornado outbreak of March 5–7, 2022	Midwestern United States, Mississippi Valley	
2022	Winter storm	8	$350 million	February 2022 North American winter storm	Central, Southeastern, Northeastern, and Midwestern United States, Northern Mexico, Nova Scotia	
2022	Blizzard	4	$50 million	January 2022 North American blizzard	Northeastern United States, New England, Maritime Provinces of Canada	
2021	Derecho and tornado outbreak	7	$1.8 billion	December 2021 Midwest derecho and tornado outbreak	Western United States, Midwestern United States, Canada	
2021	Wildfire	2	$2.3 million	2021 Kansas wildfire outbreak	Kansas	On December 15, 2021, a wildfire siege began in Western and Central Kansas due to blustering winds and drought. More than 10 wildfires were reported with an estimated burned area of more than 163,000+ acres. The wildfire outbreak resulted in the deaths of two individuals and the injuries of 3 others. More than 42 structures were destroyed during the outbreak, mainly in the cities of Paradise and Waldo.
2021	Tornado	90	$3.9 billion	Tornado outbreak of December 10–11, 2021 and 2021 Western Kentucky tornado	Kentucky, Illinois, Tennessee, Missouri, Arkansas	A rare late-season tornado outbreak devastated states across the mid-south midwest, causing widespread damage and fatalities. Kentucky was particularly hard hit, with 75 fatalities occurring in the state. There were also 3 non-tornadic fatalities.
2021	Flood	5+	$7.5 billion	November 2021 Pacific Northwest floods	Southern British Columbia, Canada Northwestern Washington, United States	
2021	Bomb cyclone	2	$400 million	October 2021 Northeast Pacific bomb cyclone	Russian Far East, Japan, Alaska, Western United States, Western Canada	
2021	Hurricane	107	$75.25 billion	Hurricane Ida	United States (especially in Louisiana, New Jersey, Gulf Coast of the United States, Northeastern United States), Cuba, Venezuela, Colombia, Jamaica	After causing widespread destruction along the Gulf Coast, (specifically Louisiana), Ida moved north, spawned a destructive tornado outbreak, and caused massive flooding in many Northeastern states such as New York, New Jersey and Pennsylvania. Ida is now the sixth-costliest tropical cyclone on record.
2021	Heat wave	229	≥$8.9 billion	2021 Western North America heat wave	Western North America	Around 600 excess deaths in the United States
2021	Floods and tornado outbreak	3	$1.56 million (tornadoes), $51.7 million (floods)	Midwestern U.S. floods and tornado outbreak of June 2021	Midwestern United States	
2021	Winter storm	29	$2 billion	February 15–20, 2021 North American winter storm	Western United States, Southern Plains, Deep South, Northeastern United States, Atlantic Canada, British Isles, Iceland, Faroe Islands	
2021	Winter storm	276	≥ $196.5 billion	February 13–17, 2021 North American winter storm	United States (especially in Texas, northern Mexico)	While the storm was widespread across the U.S., Mexico, and parts of Canada, the worst was in Texas, causing the 2021 Texas power crisis, as the energy infrastructure was unprepared for the freezing temperatures. 237 deaths (as of July 14, 2021), including 223 in the United States and 14 in Mexico.
2021	Nor'easter	7	> $1.85 billion	January 31 – February 3, 2021 nor'easter	Western United States, Central United States, Mid-Atlantic states, Northeastern United States, Southeastern United States, Eastern Canada	
2020	Wildfire	47	≥$19.884 billion	2020 Western United States wildfire season	Western United States	One of the most destructive wildfire seasons recorded in the Western United States.
2020	Wildfire	31	≥$12.079 billion	2020 California wildfires	California	The largest and the third-most destructive wildfire season on record in California.
2020	Derecho	4	$11 billion	August 2020 Midwest derecho	Midwestern United States	The severe derecho affected the states of Nebraska, Iowa, Illinois, Wisconsin, and Indiana. The derecho caused high winds and spawned an outbreak of a couple tornadoes. The derecho also caused the state of Iowa to lose approximately 550,000 acres of corn harvest. The highest wind estimate from the derecho was about 140 mph in Cedar Rapids, Iowa.
2020	Hurricane	≥211 killed, 120 missing	$7.9 billion	Hurricane Eta	Colombia, Jamaica, Central America, Cayman Islands, Cuba, The Bahamas, Southeastern United States	Long-lived tropical cyclone that made four landfalls. Caused significant amounts of destruction, especially in Central America.
2020	Hurricane	8	$3.6 billion	Hurricane Zeta	Cayman Islands, Jamaica, Central America, Yucatán Peninsula, Gulf Coast of the United States, Southeastern United States, Mid-Atlantic, New England, Ireland, United Kingdom	
2020	Hurricane	6	$3.086 billion	Hurricane Delta	Jamaica, Nicaragua, Cayman Islands, Yucatán Peninsula, Gulf Coast of the United States, Southeastern United States, Northeastern United States	
2020	Hurricane	8	$7.3 billion	Hurricane Sally	The Bahamas, Cuba, U.S. Gulf Coast, Southeastern United States, Norway	Sally did not have its name retired, making it the costliest tropical cyclone on record in the North Atlantic that did not have its name retired.
2020	Hurricane	77	$19.1 billion	Hurricane Laura	Lesser Antilles, Greater Antilles, The Bahamas, Gulf Coast of the United States, Midwestern United States, Eastern United States	Tied with the 1856 Last Island hurricane as the strongest hurricane to make landfall in the state of Louisiana, in terms of maximum sustained winds.
2020	Hurricane	18	$4.725 billion	Hurricane Isaias	West Africa, Lesser Antilles, Greater Antilles, The Bahamas, East Coast of the United States, Eastern Canada	Caused the worst tropical cyclone-spawned tornado outbreak since Hurricane Rita in 2005. Isaias did not have its name retired following the season, making Isaias the third-costliest Atlantic hurricane that didn't have its name retired.
2020	Hurricane	9	$1.2 billion	Hurricane Hanna	Cuba, Hispaniola, Gulf Coast (mainly Texas), Mexico	
2019	Tropical storm	7	$5 billion	Tropical Storm Imelda	Texas, Louisiana, Oklahoma, Arkansas	The fifth-wettest tropical cyclone recorded in the Contiguous United States. Imelda's name was not retired, making it the second-costliest Atlantic tropical cyclone name on record to not be retired.
2019	Earthquake	1 killed, 25 injured	$5.3 billion	2019 Ridgecrest earthquakes	California, Nevada, Arizona	Three earthquakes struck California between July 4 and July 5. The main earthquake was a 7.1 magnitude, as two others were 5.4 and 6.4 magnitudes. At least one was killed and several others were injured. The main earthquake was the strongest earthquake to hit the region in 20 years.
2019	Hurricane	84 killed, 245 missing	$5.1 billion	Hurricane Dorian	Lesser Antilles, Puerto Rico, The Bahamas (especially the Abaco Islands and Grand Bahama), Eastern United States (especially Florida, Georgia, South Carolina, and North Carolina), Eastern Canada	The costliest tropical cyclone recorded in the Bahamas. The storm stalled over Grand Bahama for a day.
2018	Wildfire	97	≥$26.347 billion	2018 California wildfires	California	The deadliest and most destructive wildfire season on record in California.
2018	Wildfire	85	$16.5 billion	Camp Fire	California	The worst fire in California history destroyed more than 18,000 structures in Northern California. It was fueled by large dry national forests and was started by electrical transmission lines.
2018	Hurricane	74	$25.5 billion	Hurricane Michael	Central America, Yucatán Peninsula, Cayman Islands, Cuba, Southeastern United States (especially the Florida Panhandle and Georgia), Eastern United States, Eastern Canada, Iberian Peninsula	The third-most intense landfalling tropical cyclone recorded in the United States.
2018	Hurricane	54	$24.23 billion	Hurricane Florence	West Africa, Cape Verde, Bermuda, East Coast of the United States (especially the Carolinas), Atlantic Canada	Wettest tropical cyclone recorded in the Carolinas.
2018	Hurricane	1	>$250 million	Hurricane Lane	Hawaii	Wettest tropical cyclone recorded in Hawaii.
2017	Wildfire	47	≥$18 billion	2017 California wildfires	California	The second-most destructive wildfire season on record in California (behind only 2018).
2017	Wildfire	0	$15 million	Goodwin Fire	Arizona	Started in the Bradshaw Mountains near Mayer, Arizona. The fire caused the Yavapai County Sheriff's Office and the Mayer Fire Department to close parts of Highway 69 between Mayer and Dewey-Humboldt. 100+ people had to be evacuated from Mayer and other close communities outside of Mayer also had to be evacuated such as Spring Valley and Cordes Lakes. The fire started on June 24, 2017 and it reached 100% containment on July 10. 5 homes were destroyed and 2 others were damaged.
2017	Hurricane	3,059	$91.619 billion	Hurricane Maria	Florida and Puerto Rico	Maria struck Puerto Rico as a high-end Category 4 hurricane, causing catastrophic damage to the US island due to extremely powerful winds and devastating floods. The hurricane also knocked out the entire power grid, triggering a near total island blackout. The lack of aid after the disaster caused a humanitarian crisis, the worst in the US since Hurricane Katrina, which lasted several months and had a dramatic effect on Puerto Rico's population.
2017	Hurricane	134	$77.16 billion	Hurricane Irma	Florida, South Carolina, Georgia, Puerto Rico	Irma ravaged the northern Leeward Islands as an extremely powerful Category 5 hurricane before making landfall in the Florida Keys as a Category 4 hurricane, and in the mainland as a Category 3 hurricane. Irma caused widespread damage in Florida due to high winds and destructive floods. The Florida Keys were hit the hardest, with the vast majority of infrastructure there receiving some degree of damage, and at least 25% receiving major damage. Hurricane Irma also knocked out power to 73% of the state, or 7.7 million homes and businesses.
2017	Hurricane and Flood	107	$125 billion	Hurricane Harvey	Texas, Louisiana, Alabama	Harvey made landfall in Southwestern Texas as a Category 4 hurricane. Most of the damage from Harvey occurred after it had weakened, due to extreme prolonged rains dropping several feet of water that triggered unprecedented floods in a large swath of Southeastern Texas, with the worst of the flooding occurring in Houston.
2017	Winter storm and flood	5	$1.55 billion	2017 California floods	California	Caused by a series of storms that led to California's wettest rainy season on record, in modern history.
2017	Flood	10		2017 Payson flash floods	Arizona	One of the deadliest floods to ever hit Gila County, Arizona
2016	Wildfire	14	$990 million	2016 Great Smoky Mountains wildfires	Tennessee	Destroyed nearly 2,000 structures; burned nearly 18,000 acres.
2016	Hurricane	49	$15.090 billion	Hurricane Matthew	Florida, Georgia, The Carolinas	
2016	Flood	13		2016 Louisiana floods	Louisiana	
2016	Flood	23		2016 West Virginia flood	West Virginia	
2016	Blizzard	55	≥$500 million – $3 billion	January 2016 United States blizzard	Southeast through the Mid-Atlantic to the Northeast	Snowfall totals in excess of two feet (61 cm)
2015	Flood	25	$2 billion	October 2015 North American storm complex	Carolinas	Channeled moisture from Hurricane Joaquin into the Mid-Atlantic states. Caused the worst flooding recorded in the Carolinas prior to Hurricane Florence in 2018.
2015	Flood	20		2015 Utah floods	Utah	
2015	Wildfire	3	$8 billion	Okanogan Complex fire	Okanogan County, Washington	Damage figure includes costs involved in the fighting of the fire.
2015	Flood	46		2015 Texas–Oklahoma floods	Texas, Kansas, Oklahoma	
2014	Snow storm	24		November 2014 North American winter storm	Buffalo, New York, Great Lakes region	
2014	Tornado	35	$1 billion	April 2014 tornado outbreak	Nebraska, Louisiana, Oklahoma, Illinois, Florida, North Carolina	
2014	Mudflow	43		2014 Oso mudslide	Oso, Washington	
2013 / 2014	Cold wave	21		Early 2014 North American cold wave	Eastern US	
2013	Wildfire	19		Yarnell Hill Fire	Yarnell, Arizona	
2013	Flood	8	$1.9 billion	2013 Colorado floods	Colorado	
2013	Tornado	24	$2 billion	2013 Moore tornado	Moore, Oklahoma	
2013	Blizzard	18		February 2013 nor'easter	Eastern US	
2012	Wildfire	6		2012 Colorado wildfires	Colorado	
2012	Hurricane	147	$75 billion	Hurricane Sandy	Eastern US	
2011	Tornado	158	$2.8 billion (2011 USD)	2011 Joplin tornado	Joplin, Missouri	part of the tornado outbreak sequence of May 21–26, 2011
2011	Hurricane	58	$14.2 billion (2011 USD)	Hurricane Irene	North Carolina, New York, New Jersey, Vermont, Florida, East Coast of the United States	
2011	Tornado	346	$11 billion (2011 USD)	2011 Super Outbreak	Alabama, Tennessee, Mississippi, Georgia, Arkansas and Virginia	336 tornadoes
2011	Flood	20	$2–4 billion	2011 Mississippi River floods	Mississippi River Valley	
2010	Blizzard	13	$150 million	February 5–6, 2010 North American blizzard	16 states in Eastern US	
2010	Flood	20		June 2010 Arkansas floods	near Langley, Arkansas	Albert Pike Recreational Area
2009	Snow storm	7	$2 billion	December 2009 North American blizzard	East Coast of the United States, New York, New Jersey, New England, Virginia, North Carolina, Atlantic Canada	December 16–20, 2009
2009	Tsunami	31		2009 Samoa earthquake and tsunami	American Samoa and nearby islands	189 total deaths, with 31 in American Samoa.
2008	Hurricane	113	$38 billion (2008 USD)	Hurricane Ike	Southeast Texas, Texas, Louisiana, Southern United States	At the time, Ike was the costliest natural disaster in Texas history, after leaving behind $38 billion in damages in Texas alone.
2008	Hurricane	53	$8.31 billion (2008 USD)	Hurricane Gustav	Louisiana, Mississippi, Alabama, Texas, Arkansas, Oklahoma	
2008	Tornado	59	$1.2 billion	2008 Super Tuesday tornado outbreak	Tennessee, Arkansas, Kentucky, Alabama, and Illinois	
2007	Wildfire	14	≥$2.393 billion	October 2007 California wildfires	California	Large fires burned out of control across southern California, fueled by unusually strong Santa Ana winds; worst around San Diego; caused evacuation of over one million people. Most fires accidental; some suspected arson.
2006	Wildfires	9	$226.6 million (2006 USD)	2006 California wildfires	Southern California	
2006	Snow storm	19	$530 million (2006 USD)	Lake Storm "Aphid"	Buffalo, New York	
2005	Hurricane	30	$21 billion (2005 USD)	Hurricane Wilma	Florida, East Coast of the United States	
2005	Hurricane	1,836	$125 billion (2005 USD)	Hurricane Katrina	Florida, Louisiana, Mississippi, Alabama	
2005	Hurricane	120	$10 billion (2005 USD)	Hurricane Rita	Louisiana, Texas	
2005	Hurricane	15	$2.5 billion (2005 USD)	Hurricane Dennis	Florida, Southeastern U.S	
2005	Tornado	25	$92 million	Evansville Tornado of November 2005	Missouri, Indiana, Kentucky, Ohio	7 tornadoes
2004	Hurricane	124	$19 billion (2005 USD)	Hurricane Ivan	Texas, Florida, East Coast	
2004	Hurricane	5	$7.5 billion	Hurricane Jeanne	Florida	
2004	Hurricane	49	$9 billion	Hurricane Frances	Florida	
2004	Hurricane	10	$15 billion	Hurricane Charley	Florida	
2003	Hurricane	51	$3.6 billion	Hurricane Isabel	East Coast of the United States, Virginia, Maryland, Pennsylvania	
2003	Wildfire	15	$1.331 billion	Cedar Fire	California	The largest and most destructive wildfire recorded in the modern history of San Diego County.
2001	Hurricane	41	$5.5 billion	Tropical Storm Allison	Texas, Louisiana, Pennsylvania	
1999	Hurricane	85	$6.5 billion	Hurricane Floyd	East Coast of the United States, Atlantic Canada	
1999	Heat wave	271			Midwest and Northeast	
1999	Tornado	48	$1.5 billion (2005 USD)	1999 Oklahoma tornado outbreak	Oklahoma, Kansas, Texas, Tennessee	74 tornadoes
1998 / 1999	Landslide	0	$70 million	Aldercrest-Banyon landslide	Kelso, Washington	
1998	Blizzard	30	$5 million	North American ice storm of 1998	Canada and Northeast	
1997	Flood	0	$2 billion	1997 Red River flood	North Dakota, Minnesota, Southern Manitoba	
1996	Flood	8	$500 million	Willamette Valley flood of 1996	Washington, Oregon, Idaho, California	
1995	Heat wave	739		Chicago heat wave of 1995	Chicago, Illinois	
1995	Flood	6	$1.36 billion	May 8, 1995 Louisiana flood	New Orleans, Louisiana, area	
1994	Earthquake	57	$23 billion	Northridge earthquake	Greater Los Angeles area	
1993	Blizzard	79–300	$6.6 billion	Storm of the Century	East Coast of North and Central America	
1993	Flood	50	$15 billion	Great Flood of 1993	Midwest	
1992	Hurricane	6	$3.1 billion	Hurricane Iniki	Hawaii	
1992	Hurricane	26	$25 billion	Hurricane Andrew	Florida and Louisiana	
1991	Wildfire	25	$1.5 billion	Oakland Hills fire	San Francisco Bay Area, California	
1990	Tornado	29	$160 million	1990 Plainfield tornado	Plainfield, Illinois Crest Hill, Illinois	
1989	Earthquake	69	$6 billion	Loma Prieta earthquake	San Francisco Bay Area, California	
1989	Hurricane	49	$7 billion (1989 USD)	Hurricane Hugo	Caribbean and Eastern North America.	Damage figure for U.S. only. At least 111 total deaths, with 37 in the continental U.S. and 12 in the U.S. possession of Puerto Rico.
1988	Heat wave and Drought	5,000 – 10,000	$120 billion (2014 USD)	1988-89 North American drought	Widespread; 45% of the nation affected	Costliest natural disaster in the United States prior to Hurricane Katrina.
1988	Wildfire	2	$240 million	Yellowstone fires of 1988	Yellowstone National Park, Wyoming	793,880 acres (36% of the park) was burned in the fires started by lightning.
1985	Hurricane	9	$1.3 billion	Hurricane Elena	Florida, Alabama, Mississippi, Louisiana, Arkansas, Kentucky	
1985	Hurricane	14	$900 million	Hurricane Gloria	New York, New Jersey, North Carolina, New England	
1983	Hurricane	21	$3 billion	Hurricane Alicia	Texas	
1980	Hurricane	6	$630 million (1980 USD)	Hurricane Allen	South Texas	
1980	Heat wave	1,700	$20 billion	1980 United States heat wave	Central and southern states	Official death toll, may have been higher; damage figure not adjusted for inflation.
1980	Volcano	57	$1.1 billion	1980 eruption of Mount St. Helens	Washington state	Damage figure not adjusted for inflation; figure in 2015 dollars is 2,890.
1977	Blizzard	23	$56.25 billion (1977 USD)	Great Lakes Blizzard of 1977	New York and Ontario (esp. Buffalo, New York)	
1976	Flood	145		Big Thompson Canyon Flood of 1976	Colorado	
1974	Tornado	315		1974 Super Outbreak	Ontario, Illinois, Indiana, Michigan, Ohio, Kentucky, Tennessee, Alabama, Mississippi, Georgia, North Carolina, Virginia, West Virginia and New York	148 tornadoes
1972	Flood	238	$160 million (1972 USD); $664 million (2002 USD)	1972 Rapid City Flood	Rapid City, South Dakota	Average rainfall over area of 60 mi^{2} measured at 10-15 inches (380 mm), over 6 hours in middle of night June 9–10, 1972.
1971	Earthquake	65	$500 million	Sylmar earthquake	Greater Los Angeles area	
1970	Tornado	26	$1.412 billion (2008 USD)	Lubbock Tornado	Lubbock, Texas	F5 tornado killed 26 and wounded approximately 500
1969	Hurricane	256	$1.42 billion	Hurricane Camille	Mississippi, Alabama and Virginia	
1965	Tornado	271		Palm Sunday Tornado Outbreak	Iowa, Ohio, Michigan, Indiana	78 tornadoes
1964	Tsunami and Earthquake	115	$1.8 billion (2006 USD)	Good Friday earthquake	Alaska, Hawaii, Oregon, California, British Columbia	
1960	Tsunami	61	$500 million (2005 USD)	Great Chilean earthquake	Hawaii, Alaska	2,290 to 6,600 killed and $3,500 M (2005) in damage worldwide. 61 killed in Hilo, Hawaii. $500 M in U.S. property damage
1957	Tornado	10	$26 million	1957 Fargo tornado	Fargo, ND	
1953	Tornado	114	$41 million	Waco Tornado of 1953	Waco, TX	Deadliest Tornado in Texas since 1900
1951	Flood	28	$935 million ($9.21 billion in 2019)	Great Flood of 1951	Kansas and Missouri	
1950	Blizzard	353	$67 million (1950 USD)	Great Appalachian Storm of November 1950	Eastern US states	
1946	Tsunami and Earthquake	165		Aleutian Island earthquake	Alaska and Hawaii	
1946	Tornado outbreak	47	>$3.1 million	Tornado outbreak of January 4–6, 1946	South–Central United States	Damage in 1946 United States dollars.
1945	Tornado outbreak	43	$1.972 million	Tornado outbreak of February 12, 1945	Alabama and Mississippi	Damage in 1945 United States dollars. This outbreak included a devastating tornado that struck Montgomery, Alabama, killing 26 people. The U.S. Weather Bureau would describe this tornado as "the most officially observed one in history".
1940	Blizzard	154	$2 million	Armistice Day Blizzard	North and Central Midwest	Damage total not adjusted for inflation.
1938	Hurricane	600		Great New England Hurricane		
1938	Flood	115		Los Angeles Flood of 1938	Los Angeles	
1937	Flood	385	$500 thousand	Ohio River flood of 1937	Ohio, Kentucky, Indiana, Illinois	
1936	Flood	69	$250 million ($4.66 billion in 2020)	Pittsburgh Flood 1936	Pittsburgh, Pennsylvania, area	
1935	Hurricane	423		Labor Day Hurricane of 1935	Florida	
1931 to 1939	Drought	Unknown	$1 million (2017 USD)	Dust Bowl	Great Plains	Compounded by unsustainable agricultural techniques
1928	Hurricane	3,000	$800 million (2005 USD)	1928 Okeechobee Hurricane	Leeward Islands, Puerto Rico, the Bahamas, and Florida	4,078+ believed dead total. About 2,500 died in Florida and 500 in the U.S. possession of Puerto Rico.
1927	Flood	246	$400 million	Great Mississippi Flood of 1927	Arkansas, Illinois, Kentucky, Louisiana, Mississippi, and Tennessee	
1926	Tornado	16		La Plata Tornado of 1926	La Plata, Maryland	13 killed in La Plata Elementary School
1925	Tornado	695–727	$16.5 million; $1.4 billion (1997 USD)	Tri-State Tornado	Missouri, Illinois and Indiana (Kentucky, Tennessee)	Lower number for single 3-state tornado; higher for 5-state outbreak
1919	Hurricane	600		1919 Florida Keys Hurricane	Florida, Texas	
1918	Wildfire	453	$73 million ($1.145 billion in 2015)	1918 Cloquet fire	Minnesota	Largest disaster in Minnesota history
1913	Flood	428		1913 (Ohio) Statewide Flood	Southwest, Central, and Eastern Ohio	
1913	Flood	361		Great Dayton Flood	Dayton, Ohio	Flood was created by a series of three winter storms that hit the region in March, 1913
1913	Blizzard	250		Great Lakes Storm of 1913		Fatalities estimated
1913	Storm	250	$5 million (1913 USD)	Great Lakes Storm of 1913	Great Lakes area	Financial impact for lost vessels and cargo only
1910	Avalanche	96		Wellington avalanche	Wellington, Washington	
1906	Earthquake and fire (urban conflagration)	3,000 – 6,000		1906 San Francisco earthquake	California	Conflagration followed quake; fatalities estimated
1900	Hurricane	6,000 – 12,000	$35.4 million; 1.097 billion (2020 USD)	Galveston Hurricane of 1900	Texas	Fatalities estimated – remains deadliest natural disaster in North American history.
1896	Tornado	255–400	$10 million ($307 million in 2019)	St. Louis-East St. Louis tornado	Missouri	
1894	Wildfire	418	$73 million	Great Hinckley Fire	Minnesota	Actual death toll likely higher than official death toll of 418.
1893	Hurricane	2,000		1893 Cheniere Caminada Hurricane	Louisiana	Fatalities estimated
1893	Hurricane	1,000 – 2,000		1893 Sea Islands Hurricane	Georgia, South Carolina	Fatalities estimated
1889	Flood	2,209	$17 million ($425 million in 2012)	Johnstown Flood	Johnstown, Pennsylvania	A dam failure caused 20 million tons of water to be unleashed, devastating Johnstown, PA and the surrounding area.
1888	Blizzard	400		Great Blizzard of 1888	Northeast	Fatalities estimated
1888	Cold wave	Unknown		1888 Northwest Cold Wave	Northwest	
1871	Wildfire	1,500 – 2,500		Peshtigo fire	Wisconsin	Deadliest firestorm in United States history
1862	Flood	>5,000	$100 million (1862 USD); $262.2 billion (2020 USD)	Great Flood of 1862	California, Oregon, Utah, and the territories that now make up Arizona and Nevada	An atmospheric river led to 43 continuous days of rain, lasting from December 1861 until January 1862. When it was over, much of California's Central Valley was covered with inland seas that remained for months; the state's government had to move to San Francisco as Sacramento was under 10 feet of water. California nearly went bankrupt due to the costs of the damages and the loss of tax revenues from so many farms and mines; it is considered to be the worst disaster in the state's history.
1816	Famine (caused by volcano)	100,000+		Year Without a Summer		Volcanic dust from a massive eruption by Mount Tambora in the Dutch East Indies (present Indonesia) in 1815 led to an abnormally cold summer in 1816 in the northeastern United States and eastern Canada. Cold weather inhibited crops, and frosts and snowstorms killed what did grow, leading to a localized famine.

== See also ==
- List of disasters in the United States by death toll
- List of wildfires in the United States
- Category:Lists of tropical cyclones in the United States
