= Arkansas Highway 369 =

State highway in Arkansas, United States

Highway 369
- Arkansas Highway 369 highlighted in red

Route information
- Maintained by ArDOT
- Existed: January 12, 1966–present

Section 1
- Length: 0.749 mi (1,205 m)
- South end: AR 27 in Nashville
- North end: End state maintenance in Nashville

Section 2
- Length: 26.174 mi (42.123 km)
- South end: AR 26 near Corinth
- North end: Albert Pike Recreational Area

Section 3
- Length: 0.196 mi (315 m)
- North end: AR 22 in Paris
- South end: End state maintenance in Paris

Location
- Country: United States
- State: Arkansas
- Counties: Howard, Pike, Montgomery, Logan

Highway system
- Arkansas Highway System; Interstate; US; State; Business; Spurs; Suffixed; Scenic; Heritage
← AR 368	→ AR 370

Highway 369 (AR 369 and Hwy. 369) is a designation for three north–south state highways in Arkansas. All are maintained by the Arkansas Department of Transportation (ArDOT). One segment provides connectivity in the Ouachita Mountains, with the other two serving as short industrial access roads. The longest segment was designated in 1966 and extended thrice, with the two industrial access roads created in 1978 and 1980. All three segments are maintained by the Arkansas Department of Transportation (ArDOT).

== Route description ==
The ArDOT maintains Highway 369 like all other parts of the state highway system. As a part of these responsibilities, the department tracks the volume of traffic using its roads in surveys using a metric called average annual daily traffic (AADT). ArDOT estimates the traffic level for a segment of roadway for any average day of the year in these surveys. As of 2019, AADT was estimated at 1,200 vehicles per day (VPD) near the southern terminus, with all other segments below 1,000 VPD and shrinking as it travels north. The Nashville segment was estimated at 2,700 VPD. No segment of Highway 369 has been listed as part of the National Highway System, a network of roads important to the nation's economy, defense, and mobility.

=== Nashville ===
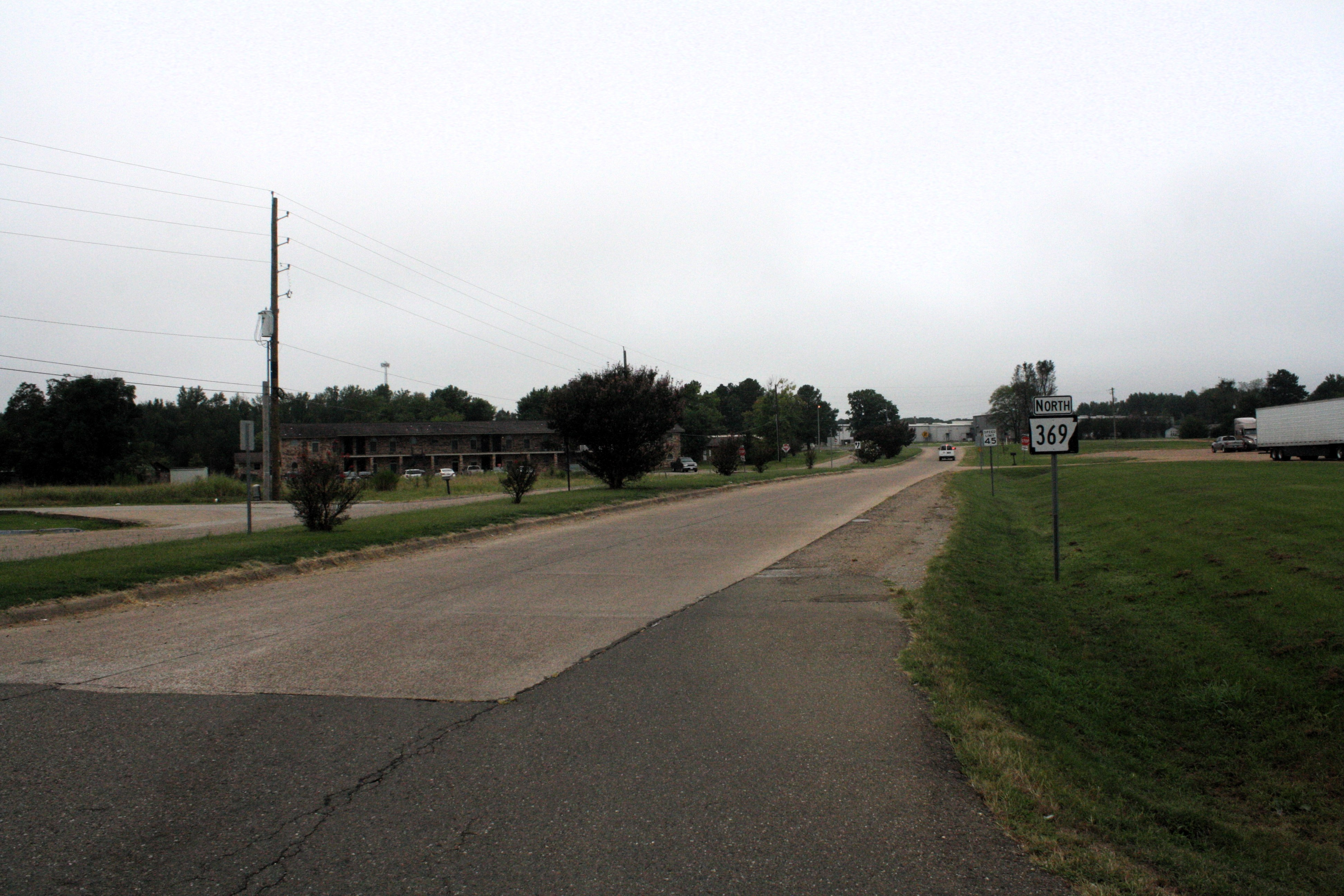
First reassurance marker for AR 369 north of AR 27 junction in Nashville

The Highway 369 designation begins in Nashville, the small-town county seat of Howard County in Southwest Arkansas. The highway begins at a junction with Highway 27 in the southwest part of the city and runs northwest as Mission Drive, beginning as a divided highway but quickly becoming a two-lane roadway through an industrial park. State maintenance ends near a crossing of the Arkansas Southern Railroad, with the roadway continuing under local maintenance.

=== Corinth to Albert Pike Recreation Area ===
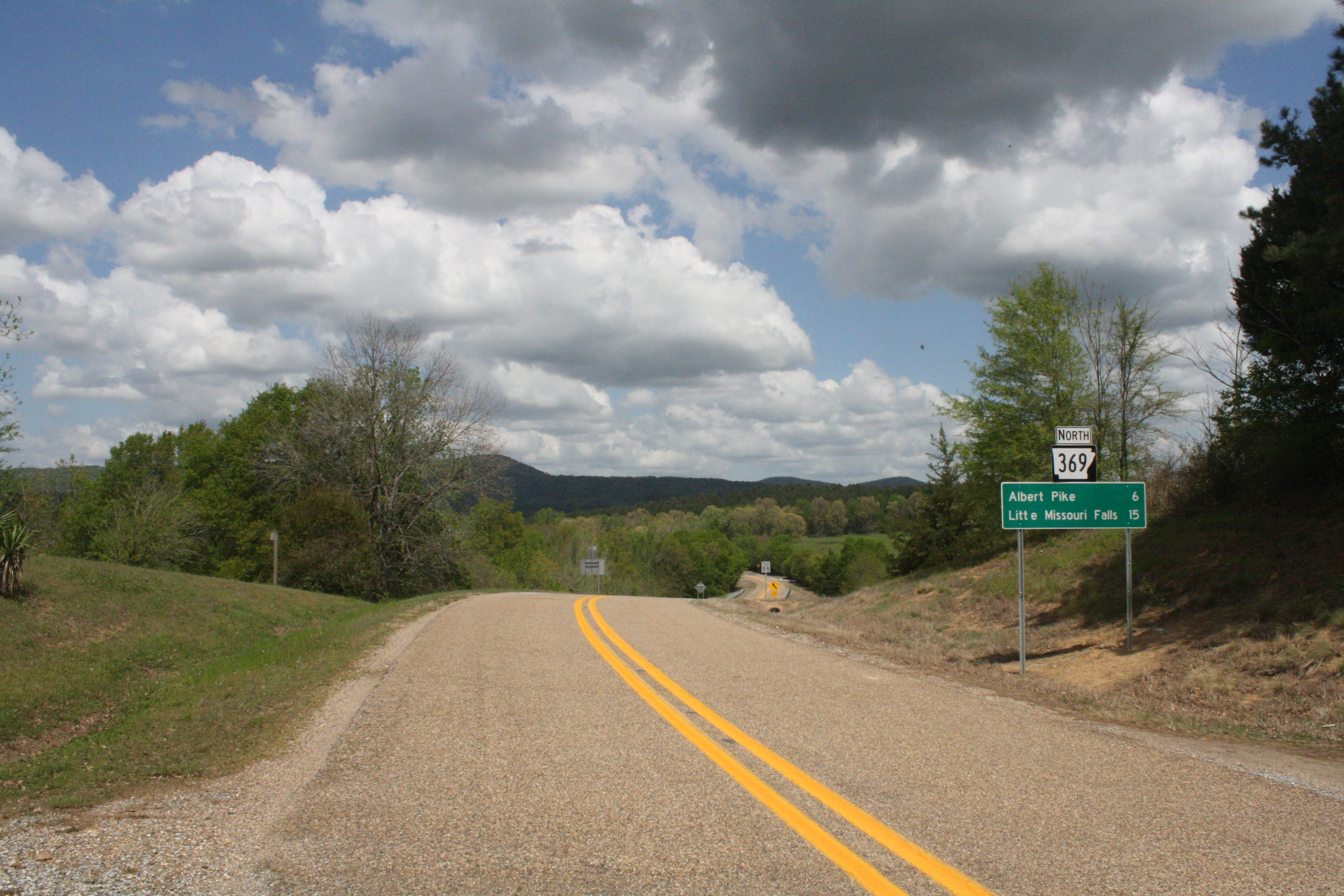
First reassurance marker for AR 369 north of Langley

A second segment of Highway 369 begins in Howard County north of Nashville at an intersection with Highway 26 at the unincorporated community of Corinth. The highway runs north through a sparsely populated, forested area, passing east of the Stone Road Glade Natural Area, crossing the Arkansas Southern Railroad, and serving the unincorporated communities of Briar and Muddy Fork before passing into Pike County. Highway 369 briefly serves as the western boundary of the Lake Greeson Wildlife Management Area (WMA) before it has a junction with U.S. Highway 70 (US 70) at Newhope. The two routes overlap eastward, crossing the Little Missouri River and running along Lake Greeson. Highway 369 turns north, ending the concurrency. The route winds north to the unincorporated community of Langley, where it intersects Highway 84. Continuing north, Highway 389 enters the Ouachita National Forest and passes into Montgomery County. Shortly after entering Montgomery County, Highway 369 serves the Albert Pike Recreation Area, a United States Forest Service recreation area, where state maintenance ends.

=== Paris ===
Highway 369 begins at Highway 22 in Paris, one of two county seats of Logan County. It is the shortest state highway in Arkansas. The highway runs south to an industrial area, where it terminates. (Note: Although Arkansas highways normally run from south to north and from west to east, the Logan County Route and Sections Map indicates that Highway 369 begins at Highway 22 and runs south.)

== History ==
The Arkansas State Highway Commission created Highway 369 on January 12, 1966, between Highway 26 and Highway 70. It was extended ten months later to Langley. In 1973, the Arkansas General Assembly passed Act 9 of 1973. The act directed county judges and legislators to designate up to 12 miles (19 km) of county roads as state highways in each county. Under this act, Highway 369 was extended from Langley to the Montgomery-Pike county line. The industrial access roads were created in 1978 (Paris segment to the Arkansas Charcoal Manufacturing Plant) and 1980 (Nashville segment to the Tyson Foods feed mill). The AHTD and the US Forest Service decided to improve Montgomery County Road 4 (CR 4) and Forest Service Road 143 near Albert Pike in August 1987 to benefit the tourism industry. Following construction, the Highway 369 supplanted CR 4 to Albert Pike on January 9, 1991.

== Major intersections ==
Mile markers reset at concurrencies.

County	Location	mi	km	Destinations	Notes
Howard	Nashville	0.000	0.000	AR 27	Southern terminus
Howard	Nashville	0.749	1.205	End state maintenance, roadway continues as Mission Drive	Northern terminus
Howard	Gap in route				
Howard		0.000	0.000	AR 26	Southern terminus
Pike	Newhope	14.678	23.622	US 70 west – Dierks, Kirby	Begin US 70 overlap
Pike	Overlap, see Highway 70				
Pike		0.000	0.000	US 70 east – Kirby, DeQueen	End US 70 overlap
Pike	Langley	5.5	8.9	AR 84 – Umpire, Salem	
Montgomery	Albert Pike Recreation Area	11.496	18.501	End state maintenance	Northern terminus
Gap in route
Logan	Paris	0.000	0.000	AR 22	Northern terminus
Logan	Paris	0.196	0.315	End state maintenance, roadway continues as Charcoal Road	Southern terminus
1.000 mi = 1.609 km; 1.000 km = 0.621 mi: Concurrency terminus

== Sources ==
- "Minutes of the Meeting of the Arkansas State Highway Commission" (PDF). Little Rock: Arkansas State Highway Commission. 1953–1969. OCLC 21798861. Archived from the original (PDF) on October 1, 2018.
- "Minutes of the Meeting of the Arkansas State Highway Commission" (PDF). Little Rock: Arkansas State Highway Commission. 1970–1979. OCLC 21798861. Archived from the original (PDF) on November 5, 2011.
- "Minutes of the Meeting of the Arkansas State Highway Commission" (PDF). Little Rock: Arkansas State Highway Commission. 1980–1989. OCLC 21798861.
- "Minutes of the Meeting of the Arkansas State Highway Commission" (PDF). Little Rock: Arkansas State Highway Commission. 1990–1999. OCLC 21798861. Archived from the original (PDF) on July 21, 2019.
- "Minutes of the Meeting of the Arkansas State Highway Commission" (PDF). Little Rock: Arkansas State Highway Commission. 2000–2009. OCLC 21798861.
- "Minutes of the Meeting of the Arkansas State Highway Commission" (PDF). Little Rock: Arkansas State Highway Commission. 2010–2019. OCLC 21798861. Archived from the original (PDF) on March 4, 2016.
