= Dierks School District =

School district in Arkansas, United States

Location
- United States

District information
- Grades: K–12
- Superintendent: Grover Hill
- Accreditation: Arkansas Department of Education
- Schools: Dierks High School; JoAnn Walters Elementary School
- NCES District ID: 0505340

Students and staff
- Students: 504
- Teachers: 69.11
- Staff: 41.83
- District mascot: Outlaws
- Colors: Blue; White

Other information
- Website: www.dierksschools.org

Dierks School District is based in Dierks, Arkansas, United States. The district serves more than 575 students in prekindergarten through twelfth grade and employs more than 100 educators and staff.

The school district encompasses 224.85 square miles (582.4 km^{2}) of land in Howard County, Pike County, and Sevier County and serves all or portions of Dierks, Lockesburg, Newhope, Kirby, Langley, and Nashville.

== Schools ==
- Dierks High School, serving grades 7 through 12.
- JoAnn Walters Elementary School, serving prekindergarten through grade 12.
