= Caddo Gap, Arkansas =

- Census-designated place
- Location within Arkansas Location within the United States
- Coordinates: 34°24′16″N 93°37′18″W
- Country: United States
- State: Arkansas
- County: Montgomery

Area
  - Total: 0.40 sq mi (1.0 km^{2})
  - Land: 0.40 sq mi (1.0 km^{2})
  - Water: 0.0 sq mi (0 km^{2})
- Elevation: 640 ft (200 m)

Population (2020)
  - Total: 39
- Time zone: UTC-6 (Central (CST))
  - Summer (DST): UTC-5 (CDT)
- ZIP code: 71935
- GNIS feature ID: 2805629
- FIPS Code: 05-10330

Caddo Gap is an unincorporated community and census-designated place (CDP) in Montgomery County, Arkansas, United States. It lies between Glenwood and Norman, on the Caddo River. It was first listed as a CDP in the 2020 census with a population of 39.

== History ==
Caddo Gap is best known as the site where explorer Hernando de Soto and his forces clashed with the Native American Tula tribe in 1541, a group loosely affiliated with the Caddo Confederacy. The expedition described the Tula Indians as the fiercest they had encountered during their journey into North America. After this, the expedition turned back east, reaching as far as the Mississippi River, where de Soto died. It remains unclear whether he died of fever or from a wound received during the fighting. The expedition held a secret burial ceremony and deposited his body in the river. A monument commemorating this event stands in the heart of the small community.

=== Flood ===
During the night of June 10–11, 2010, a flash flood along Little Missouri River killed at least 20 people in the campgrounds of the Albert Pike Recreation Area near Caddo Gap. In a matter of less than four hours water rose from 3 feet (0.91 m) to over 23 feet (7.0 m).

== Education ==
Caddo Gap is in the Caddo Hills School District.

== Demographics ==
Historical population
| Census | Pop. | Note | %± |
|---|---|---|---|
| 2020 | 39 | | — |
U.S. Decennial Census; 2020

=== 2020 census ===
Caddo Gap CDP, Arkansas – Racial and ethnic composition Note: the US Census treats Hispanic/Latino as an ethnic category. This table excludes Latinos from the racial categories and assigns them to a separate category. Hispanics/Latinos may be of any race.
| Race / Ethnicity (NH = Non-Hispanic) | Pop 2020 | % 2020 |
|---|---|---|
| White alone (NH) | 34 | 87.18% |
| Black or African American alone (NH) | 0 | 0.00% |
| Native American or Alaska Native alone (NH) | 1 | 2.56% |
| Asian alone (NH) | 0 | 0.00% |
| Pacific Islander alone (NH) | 1 | 2.56% |
| Some Other Race alone (NH) | 0 | 0.00% |
| Mixed Race or Multi-Racial (NH) | 2 | 5.13% |
| Hispanic or Latino (any race) | 1 | 2.56% |
| Total | 39 | 100.00% |

== Notable people ==
- Osro Cobb, lawyer and politician
