= Arkansas Highway 84 =

State highway in Arkansas

Highway 84

Route information
- Maintained by ArDOT
- Existed: 1926–present

Section 1
- Length: 3.7 mi (6.0 km)
- West end: CR 14 in Bogg Springs
- East end: US 59 / US 71 near Wickes

Section 2
- Length: 85.8 mi (138.1 km)
- West end: US 278 in Umpire
- East end: US 270B in Rockport

Location
- Country: United States
- State: Arkansas

Highway system
- Arkansas Highway System; Interstate; US; State; Business; Spurs; Suffixed; Scenic; Heritage
| ← AR 83 | → AR 85 |

Arkansas Highway 84 (AR 84, Hwy. 84) is a designation for two state highways in west Arkansas. The western segment is 3.7 miles (6.0 km) long and travels from County Road 14 (CR 14) in Bogg Springs and heads east to U.S. Route 59 and U.S. Route 71 (US 59/US 71) before terminating. The eastern segment is 85.8 miles long and travels from US 278 in Umpire to U.S. 270B in Malvern.

== Major intersections ==
=== Western segment ===
The entire route is in Polk County.

| Location | mi | km | Destinations | Notes |
|---|---|---|---|---|
| Bogg Springs | 0.0 | 0.0 | CR 14 east | Western terminus |
| | 3.7 | 6.0 | US 59 / US 71 – Mena, De Queen | Eastern terminus |
1.000 mi = 1.609 km; 1.000 km = 0.621 mi

=== Eastern segment ===
| County | Location | mi | km | Destinations | Notes |
|---|---|---|---|---|---|
| Howard | Umpire | 0.0 | 0.0 | US 278 – Dierks, Wickes | Western terminus |
| Howard | Athens | 6.0 | 9.7 | AR 246 west to US 71 – Shady Lake Recreation Area | Eastern terminus of AR 246 |
| Pike | Langley | 14.0 | 22.5 | AR 369 – Albert Pike Recreational Area | |
| Pike | Salem | 27.3 | 43.9 | US 70 east / AR 27 north – Glenwood | West end of concurrency with US 70/AR 27 |
| Pike | Kirby | 31.9 | 51.3 | US 70 west – Lake Greeson, De Queen | East end of concurrency with US 70/AR 27 |
| Pike | Kirby | 31.9 | 51.3 | AR 27 south – Murfreesboro | East end of concurrency with US 70/AR 27 |
| Pike | | 41.1 | 66.1 | AR 8 west – Glenwood | West end of concurrency with AR 8 |
| Clark | Amity | 42.7 | 68.7 | AR 8 east (East Thompson Street) | East end of concurrency with AR 8 |
| Clark | Amity | 42.9 | 69.0 | AR 182 west | Eastern terminus of AR 182 |
| Clark | | 48.0 | 77.2 | AR 346 south | Northern terminus of AR 346 |
| Hot Spring | Point Cedar | 55.5 | 89.3 | AR 347 north | Southern terminus of AR 347 |
| Hot Spring | Bismarck | 64.5 | 103.8 | AR 7 (Central Avenue) – Hot Springs, Arkadelphia | |
| Hot Spring | De Roche | 71.4 | 114.9 | AR 128 west – Caney | West end of concurrency with AR 128 |
| Hot Spring | | 72.4 | 116.5 | AR 128 east | East end of concurrency with AR 128 |
| Hot Spring | Social Hill | 79.6 | 128.1 | I-30 west – Texarkana | I-30 exit 91 |
| Hot Spring | Malvern | 85.5 | 137.6 | AR 171 north – Lake Catherine | Southern terminus of AR 171 |
| Hot Spring | Malvern | 85.6 | 137.8 | I-30 – Little Rock, Texarkana | I-30 exit 97 |
| Hot Spring | Rockport | 85.8 | 138.1 | US 270B | Eastern terminus |
1.000 mi = 1.609 km; 1.000 km = 0.621 mi: Concurrency terminus
