= Little Missouri =

Little Missouri may:

- Little Missouri (horse), an American Thoroughbred racehorse
- Little Missouri Falls, a sizable waterfall on the upper reaches of the Little Missouri River in southwest Arkansas, United States
- Little Missouri National Grassland, a National Grassland located in western North Dakota, United States
- Little Missouri State Park, a state park in North Dakota, United States, along the Little Missouri River

== See also ==
- Little Missouri River (disambiguation)
- Missouri (disambiguation)
