= Arkansas Highway 246 =

State highway in Arkansas, United States

Highway 246

Route information
- Maintained by ArDOT
- Existed: July 10, 1957–present

Section 1
- Length: 5.99 mi (9.64 km)
- West end: Zafra Road at the Oklahoma state line near West Valley
- East end: US 59 / US 71 in Hatfield

Section 2
- Length: 26.16 mi (42.10 km)
- West end: US 59 / US 71 near Vandervoort
- East end: AR 84 in Athens

Location
- Country: United States
- State: Arkansas
- Counties: Polk, Howard

Highway system
- Arkansas Highway System; Interstate; US; State; Business; Spurs; Suffixed; Scenic; Heritage
← AR 245	→ AR 247

Arkansas Highway 246 (AR 246) is a designation of two state highways in Southwest Arkansas. The route runs from the Oklahoma state line east to US 59/US 71 in Hatfield. A second segment runs from US 59/US 71 near Vandervoort east to AR 84 in Athens. The highways were created in 1963 and 1957, respectively during a period of highway system expansion. Both routes are maintained by the Arkansas Department of Transportation (ArDOT).

== History ==
AR 246 was designated by the Arkansas State Highway Commission on July 10, 1957, during a period of expansion in the state highway system. The Arkansas General Assembly passed the Act 148 of 1957, the Milum Road Act, creating 10–12 miles (16–19 km) of new state highways in each county.

The first route began at US 71 near Vandevoort and ran east for 8 miles (13 km). The Hatfield segment was created on April 24, 1963. The Vandevoort segment was extended east to the Howard County line in 1965, with a final extension to AR 84 in 1972.

== Major intersections ==
County	Location	mi	km	Destinations	Notes
Polk		0.00	0.00	Zafra Road	Continuation into Oklahoma
Polk	Hatfield	5.99	9.64	US 59 / US 71 – Mena, Waldron, DeQueen	Eastern terminus
Polk	Gap in route				
Polk		0.00	0.00	US 59 / US 71 – Mena, Waldron, DeQueen	Western terminus
Howard	Athens	26.16	42.10	AR 84 – Umpire, Langley, Salem	Eastern terminus
1.000 mi = 1.609 km; 1.000 km = 0.621 mi
