= Little Missouri River =

Little Missouri River can refer to two rivers in the United States:

- Little Missouri River (Arkansas) in Arkansas
- Little Missouri River (North Dakota) in Wyoming, Montana, South Dakota and North Dakota

== See also ==
- Little Missouri (disambiguation)
