= 2010 Arkansas floods =

June 2010 flash flood in Arkansas, USA

Coordinates: 34°22′23″N 93°52′44″W

June 2010 Arkansas floods
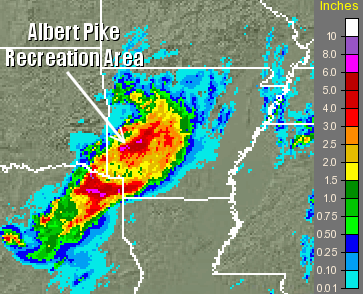
- Rainfall estimates from the National Weather Service

Meteorological history
- Duration: June 10–11, 2010

Overall effects
- Fatalities: At least 20
- Damage: Unknown
- Areas affected: Ouachita National Forest, Arkansas

The 2010 Arkansas floods were flash floods that killed at least 20 people near Langley, Arkansas, United States, in the early morning of June 11, 2010. Heavy, localized rainfall from six to eight inches (150–200 mm) flooded the Little Missouri and Caddo rivers, sweeping through campsites in the Ouachita National Forest.

== Cause ==
The floods were caused by heavy rain on the evening of June 10 and the early morning of June 11 in the Ouachita National Forest, causing the Little Missouri River and Caddo River to rise at a rate of up to 8 feet (2.4 m) per hour. The Little Missouri peaked at over 23 feet (7.0 m) near Langley, up from its ordinary level of 3 feet (0.91 m). The floods affected camping sites around the rivers, with between 200 and 300 campers awakening to rapidly rising water,

A flood of this size had not occurred in the area since records began in 1988. A local resident said none such had happened since May 1968, when the site "was not the popular camping spot it is today."

Warnings were issued in advance of the flooding; however, the warnings may not have been heard due to the remoteness of the affected areas.

== Effect ==
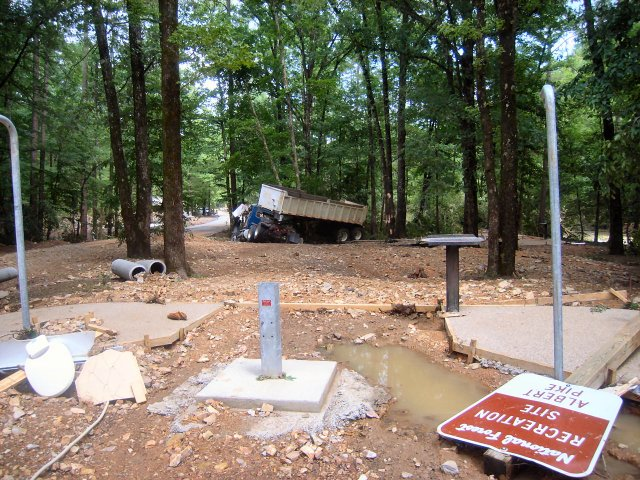
Debris from the flooded campground, June 11

At least 20 people died in the floods (including at least six children), and about 24 people were missing. Many of the casualties were caused by a flood sweeping through a heavily populated campsite at the Albert Pike Recreational Area, at about 5:30 am on June 11. The flood had caught campers by surprise while they slept in their tents, and destroyed a number of cabins.

The American Red Cross estimated that over 200 people were in the areas affected by the floods at the time the floods hit. The missing were being searched for by National Guard helicopters. President Barack Obama pledged federal emergency assistance if it was required by Arkansas. Emergency management officials stated the search and rescue efforts would be difficult as the number of missing was unknown, and the missing were not necessarily confined to campsites. A logbook at the Albert Pike Recreational Area that would have helped track the whereabouts of hikers was swept away in the flood, leaving rescuers with little idea how many hikers could be missing. Rescue efforts were also hampered by roads rendered inaccessible by the flooding; some searchers used canoes or kayaks. A call center set up by the Arkansas Department of Emergency Management received inquiries in respect of 73 people who may have been missing.

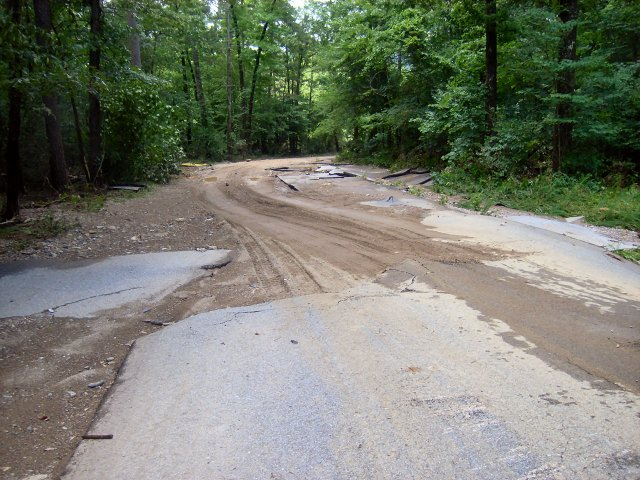
The force of water stripped the pavement from this road.

In a statement, President Obama said: "Michelle and I would like to extend heartfelt condolences to the families and friends of those who lost their lives during this horrible flash flood, and we offer our prayers for those who anxiously await news of loved ones still missing."
