= Arkansas Highway 346 =

State highway in Arkansas, United States

Highway 346

Route information
- Maintained by ArDOT
- Length: 3.204 mi (5.156 km)
- Existed: November 23, 1966–present

Major junctions
- South end: Caddo River
- North end: AR 84

Location
- Country: United States
- State: Arkansas
- Counties: Clark

Highway system
- Arkansas Highway System; Interstate; US; State; Business; Spurs; Suffixed; Scenic; Heritage
← AR 345	→ AR 347

Highway 346 (AR 346, Ark. 346, and Hwy. 346) is an east–west state highway in Clark County, Arkansas. The highway runs from the Caddo River to AR 84.

== Route description ==
AR 346 begins near Amity Landing Recreation Area, a United States Army Corps of Engineers site on the Caddo River. The route runs north through the Piney Woods forest to AR 84, where it terminates.

== History ==
AR 346 was created by the Arkansas State Highway Commission on November 23, 1966 along a county road from AR 8 to the Caddo River. In 1973, the Arkansas General Assembly passed Act 9 of 1973. The act directed county judges and legislators to designate up to 12 miles (19 km) of county roads as state highways in each county. One of the extensions in Clark County extended AR 346 across the Caddo River to AR 84. In 1992, the Highway Commission granted the Clark County judge's request to transfer jurisdiction of the segment between AR 8 and the Caddo River in exchange for creation of AR 26 Spur (AR 26S) in Gum Springs.

== Major intersections ==
The entire route is in Clark County.

Location	mi	km	Destinations	Notes
	0.000	0.000	Caddo River	Western terminus
	3.204	5.156	AR 84 – Amity, Bismarck	Eastern terminus
1.000 mi = 1.609 km; 1.000 km = 0.621 mi
