= 2006 Mid-Atlantic United States flood =

Natural disaster in the United States

Mid-Atlantic United States flood of 2006
- The Delaware River overspilled its banks and overtook US 46 in Columbia, NJ

Meteorological history
- Duration: June 25–July 5, 2006

Overall effects
- Fatalities: 16
- Damage: $1 billion (equivalent to $1.49 billion in 2024)
- Areas affected: Delaware, Maryland, New Jersey, New York, Pennsylvania, Virginia, Washington, DC

A significant flood affected much of the Mid-Atlantic region of the eastern United States in 2006. The flooding was very widespread, affecting numerous rivers, lakes and communities from Upstate New York to North Carolina. It was widely considered to be the worst flooding in the region since Hurricane David in 1979. It was also one of the worst floodings in the United States since Hurricane Katrina in August 2005. At least 16 deaths were related to the flooding.

== Meteorological history ==
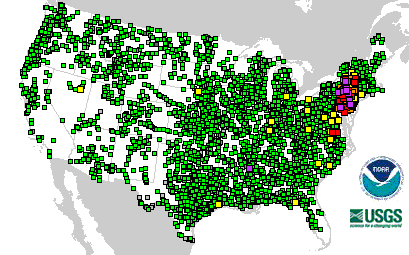
NOAA/USGS map of river flooding, June 29, 2006, around 1530 UTC. Note the purples and reds in the Northeastern United States. Click the image for a color key.

The flooding was attributed to several weather factors that all came together over the region. The primary factor was the stalling of the jet stream just to the west of the Appalachian Mountains. That, combined with the Bermuda High over the Atlantic Ocean, blocked any systems from moving inland or offshore. The influence of a tropical low (which nearly became a tropical storm but did not attain a full surface circulation) off the North Carolina coast allowed a constant stream of tropical moisture to enter the Mid-Atlantic region. The resulting heavy and prolonged rains overflowed the banks of many rivers, lakes, and streams, leading to the flooding. A senior National Weather Service meteorologist declared that rain events of this size take place in the region only every 200 years.

== Impact ==
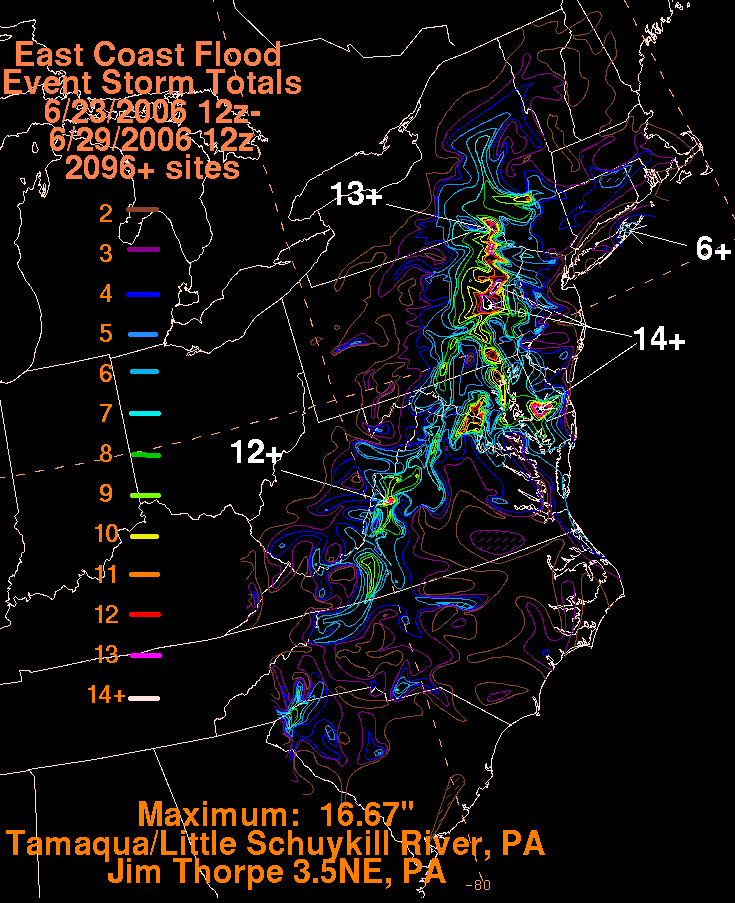
Rainfall in the East, June 23–29, 2006

=== Delaware ===
Considerable flooding occurred in much of Delaware, particularly in Sussex County, where Governor Ruth Ann Minner declared a state of emergency. The hardest hit community was Seaford, where 40 families were temporarily homeless and many homes and businesses were damaged.

=== District of Columbia ===
Significant street and river flooding was reported in Washington, D.C. Several important federal buildings, including the National Archives and Records Administration, the Internal Revenue Service, the United States Department of Justice and some of the Smithsonian Institution, were closed. Mayor Anthony A. Williams declared a state of emergency as a result of the flooding and the threat of power outages and other problems. Sections of Beach Drive in Rock Creek Park were washed out. The road was closed for several months for repair and reinforcing. Beach Drive is the main north–south road through the park and is a major commuter artery.

=== Maryland ===
The most severe flooding took place in and around Montgomery County. Over 2,200 people had to be evacuated from the area south of Lake Needwood in Rockville due to concerns of a dam break there (the earthen dam was leaking). If the dam were to break, communities downstream could be under as much as 22 feet (6.7 m) of flood water. The dam did not break, however, and the evacuations ended on the evening of June 29. US 29 (Colesville Road) in Silver Spring and MD 198 near Fort Meade were among the dozens of roadways closed due to high water. Parts of Laurel in Prince George's County were also evacuated after floodgates were opened to relieve pressure on a nearby dam.

In Frederick County, three people were killed when they attempted to cross the flood waters from Middle Creek. Also in Frederick County, a 14-year-old boy and a 16-year-old boy drowned while swimming in a swollen creek that feeds into the Monocacy River. On July 4 in Prince George's County, the body of a 22-year-old man was recovered. It was determined that his car was swept off US 29 by the floodwaters nearly two weeks prior. In Harford County, several inches of rain fell for several days. Parts of the Susquehanna River and Deer Creek flooded, and several rescues were performed. Damage to roads and agriculture in the Eastern Shore region alone was estimated to be around $12 million (equivalent to $17.9 million in 2024).

On Friday, June 30, Maryland Governor Robert Ehrlich requested federal disaster aid for five Maryland counties: Caroline, Cecil, Dorchester, Harford, and Montgomery. However, Ehrlich stated in a letter requesting the aid to President George W. Bush that more counties could be included after damage assessments. Governor Ehrlich stated that damages in Maryland could exceed $10 million (equivalent to $14.9 million in 2024). Ehrlich also requested, in addition to federal disaster aid, funds for "hazard mitigation assistance", which is federal money used to help governments rebuild antiquated structures with modern structures. Ehrlich also obtained loans from the federal Small Business Administration to help private property owners, both residential and business, to rebuild or repair damaged buildings.

=== New Jersey ===
The heaviest flooding in New Jersey was along and near the Delaware River, on the border with Pennsylvania. Over 1,000 people were evacuated from low-lying areas of Trenton, and some state government buildings were closed. In addition, Trenton's water filtration system was shut down because of debris floating down the Delaware, and Mayor Douglas Palmer called for conservation, saying the city had only about two days of drinkable water. The river was expected to crest Friday at nearly 8 feet (2.4 m) over flood stage, the fourth-highest level on record for Trenton. Governor Jon Corzine had declared a state of emergency for the entire state as a result of the flooding.

=== New York ===
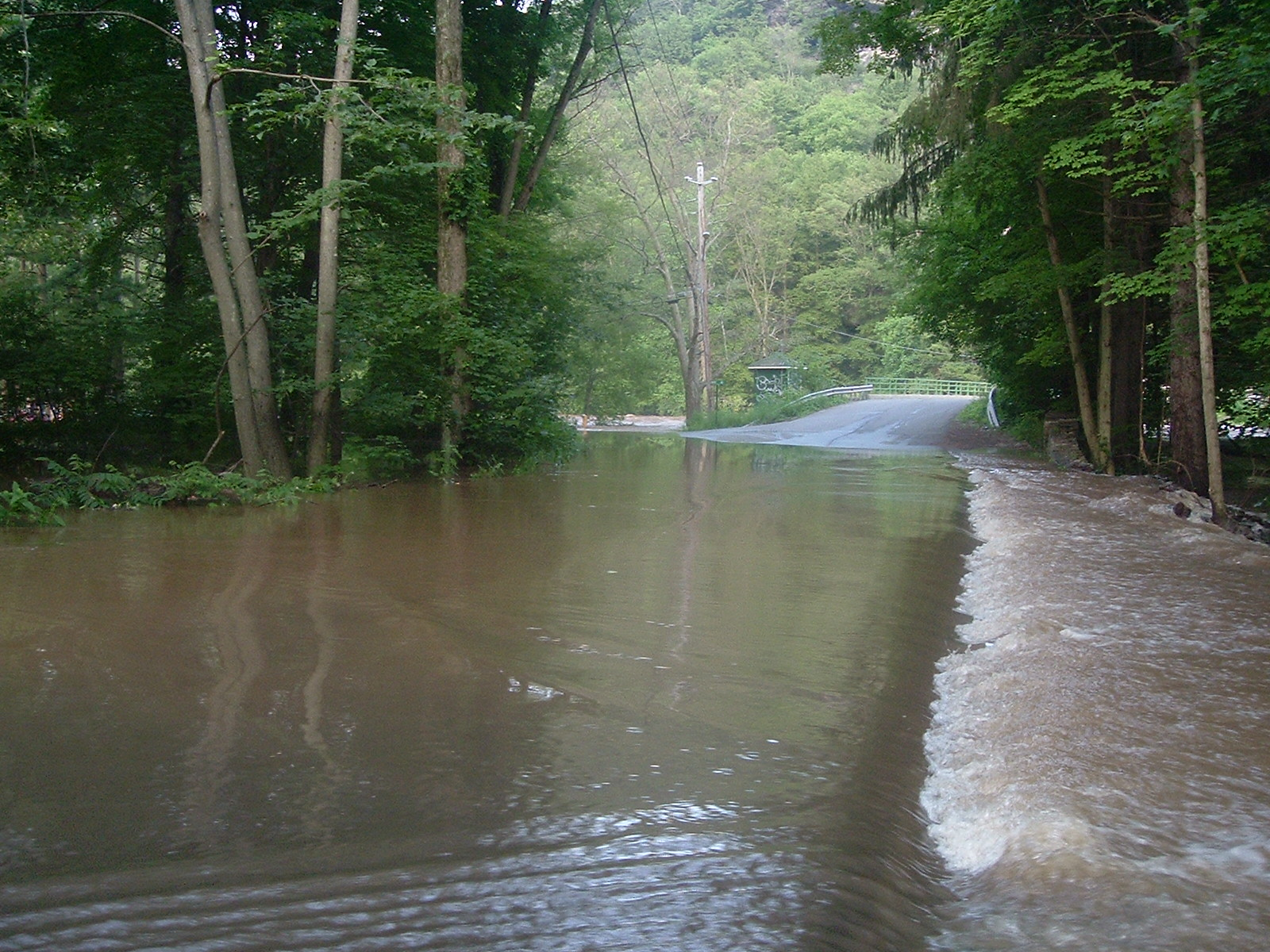
Water from the Neversink River rushes over a road in Deerpark, New York

Significant flooding took place in the Southern Tier region, particularly around Binghamton and Waverly/Sayre (on the New York-Pennsylvania border). Riverside communities were severely flooded, and many evacuations took place in the region which stretched along the Susquehanna, Chenango, Delaware and Unadilla rivers. The Susquehanna River in Bainbridge crested at 27 feet (8.2 m), 14 feet (4.3 m) over the flood stage. This was the highest the river had ever reached in the Bainbridge area. In Broome County alone, over 5,000 people were forced to evacuate, particularly in the submerged town of Conklin. Two people were killed when a section of I-88 washed away and two trucks drove into the chasm created. The Mohawk River valley also experienced significant flooding, with damage occurring to Lock 10 on the Erie Canal. In Port Jervis, the Delaware River flooded low areas of the city that had barely recovered from the record flooding of April 2005. The Neversink River also swelled, prompting officials to close the Neversink bridge. The Mid-Delaware Bridge (carrying US 6/US 209) was also closed.

Governor George Pataki estimated that damage in the state could exceed $100 million (equivalent to more than $149 million in 2024). Many of the records levels during this flood would be topped five years later in 2011 when the remnants of Tropical Storm Lee struck the area.

=== Pennsylvania ===
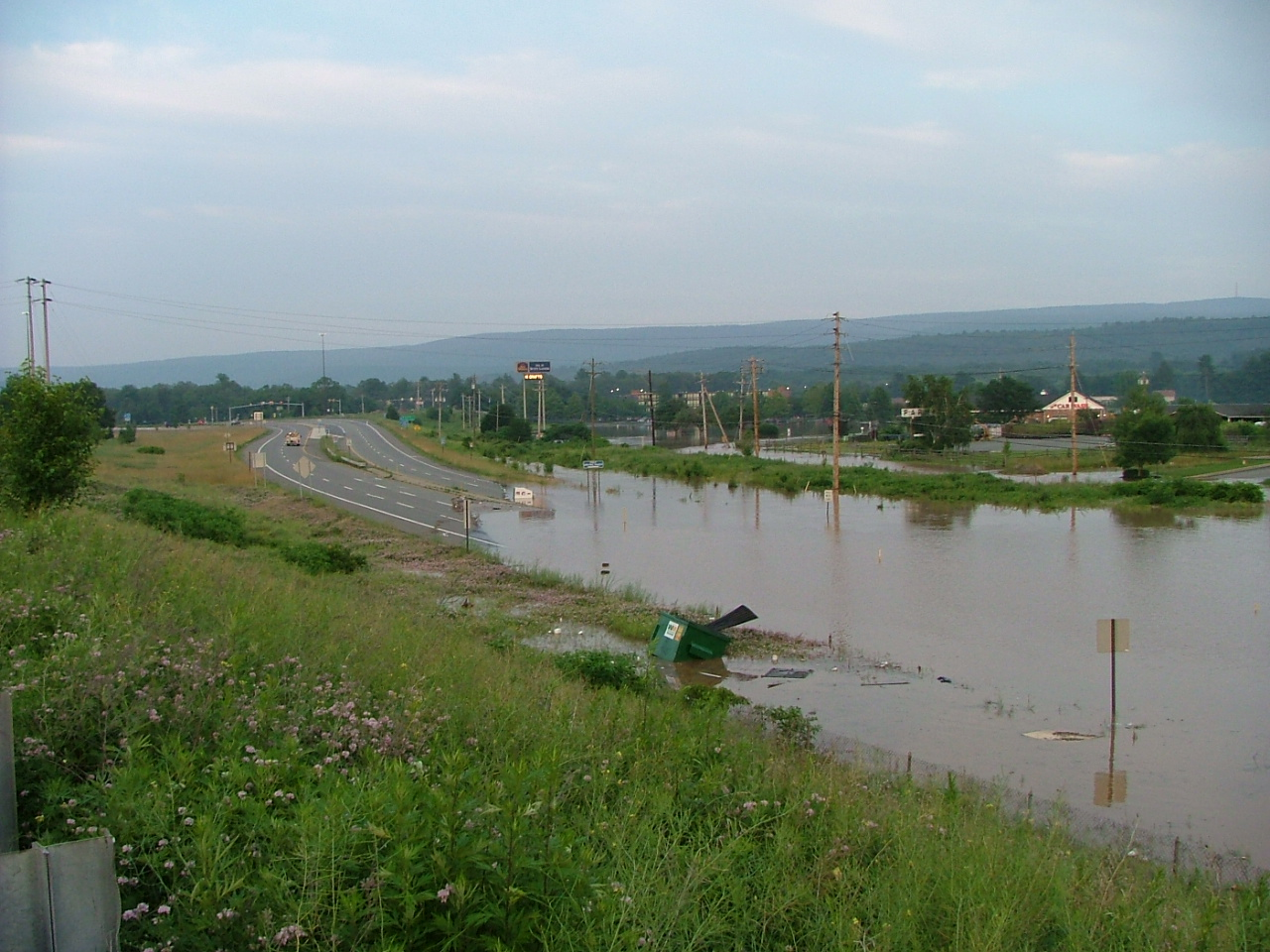
US 6/US 209 flooded by the Delaware River at Westfall, PA

The worst flooding in the state took place in the Susquehanna River valley and its tributaries. Over 200,000 residents in northeastern Pennsylvania had to be evacuated due to the rising floodwaters. Damage in Susquehanna County alone totaled over $100 million (equivalent to more than $149 million in 2024). Extensive river flooding was reported in dozens of communities in eastern Pennsylvania. Over 70 people had to be rescued from rooftops by U.S. Coast Guard helicopters after being stranded by the floodwaters. At the Wilkes-Barre flood protection levee, the river was at 41 feet (12 m), which was about the record level reached in Hurricane Agnes and at which point catastrophic flooding takes place. Forecasts predicted that the river would crest at above 39 feet (12 m), exceeding any other event other than Agnes and leading to significant flooding in other communities with less protection. Luzerne County officials said the large evacuations were precautionary, as there was a potential for the area to be isolated if the most severe predictions took hold. In Reading, the Schuylkill River's flood stage is 13 feet (4.0 m), and the river was projected to crest at about 23 feet (7.0 m), resulting in the worst flooding in the area since Hurricane Agnes. In Easton, the Delaware River crested at 17 feet (5.2 m) above flood stage. At Riegelsville, the river was at 14 feet (4.3 m) above flood level, and at New Hope it crested at 8 feet (2.4 m) above flood level.

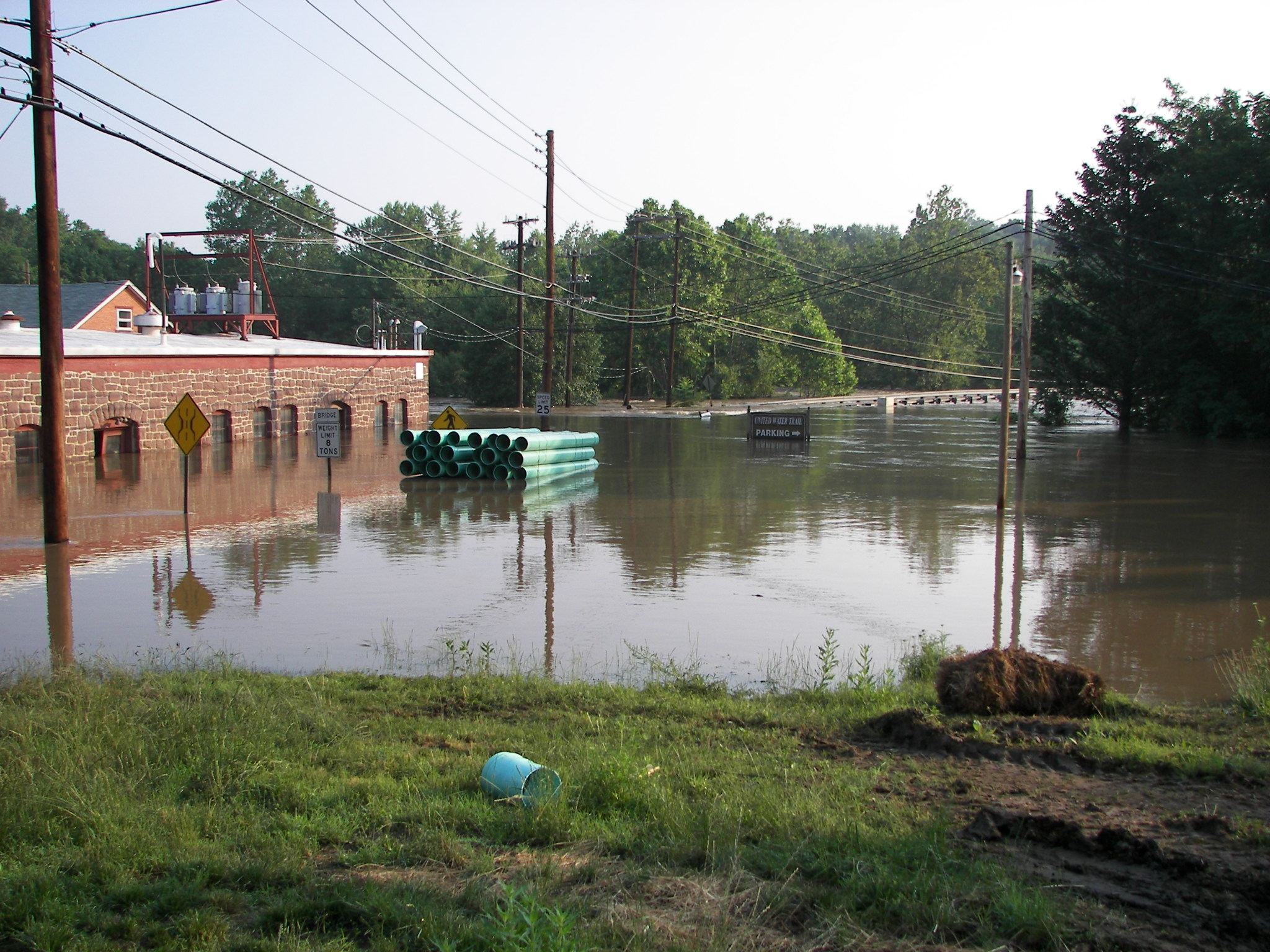
Swatara Creek inundates the United Water Plant and the Duke Street Bridge in Hummelstown, PA

In Harrisburg, a festival's start in the city was pushed back and cut down, due to the potential for the flood, and the Harrisburg Senators were forced to play two "home games" in Bowie, Maryland, due to flooding in Commerce Bank Park. Philadelphia's Kelly Drive and West River Drive were closed. The Knoebels amusement park in Elysburg was closed due to the flooding of local creeks and did not reopen until Friday afternoon. The Manayunk neighborhood in Philadelphia issued a mandatory evacuation for the area between Main Street and Ridge and Levering. Severe flooding of Swatara Creek near Hershey and Hummelstown closed many roads in the area and damaged a number of homes. The creek crested at 16.12 feet (4.91 m) around 7 am on June 29, breaking the previous official record of 15.37 feet (4.68 m), which was set September 27, 1975. However, this did not come close to the flooding after Hurricane Agnes, which caused the creek to crest at approximately 28 feet (8.5 m) on June 23, 1972. Hummelstown was flooded briefly (3–4 days), mainly across Duke and Water streets, as well as the railroad tracks. In Pike County, the Delaware River caused extensive damage to Matamoras Borough and Westfall Township. The Delaware crested in the early hours of June 29 at 32.16 feet (9.80 m) at Milford (as per NOAA hydrograph) The record level of the river at Milford is 35.5 feet (10.8 m), and flood stage is 25 feet (7.6 m). On Friday, June 30, US 209 between Milford and the Monroe County line at Lehman Township was closed. In Wayne County, the opening of the Lake Wallenpaupack spillway caused damage downstream. The Delaware River also caused damage on the eastern border of the county. Damage in Wayne County totaled about $50 million (equivalent to $74.6 million in 2024). In Lackawaxen, the Zane Grey museum, part of the Upper Delaware Scenic and Recreational River, sustained significant damage.

Of the 67 counties in Pennsylvania, 46 were under a state of emergency as declared by Governor Ed Rendell. Four deaths were confirmed in Pennsylvania; two in Luzerne County, one near Gettysburg, and one in rural Wayne County.

=== Virginia ===
Flooding occurred in many areas in Virginia, particularly in the north. A mudslide closed the Capital Beltway (I-495) in Alexandria for several hours on Monday, June 26. Mudslides were also witnessed in the mountainous regions. Governor Tim Kaine declared a state of emergency for the entire Commonwealth of Virginia.

== See also ==
- Floods in the United States
- 2025 Mid-Atlantic United States flood
