= Dierks High School =

Location
- 900 Old Hwy 70 West; Dierks, Arkansas 71833; United States
- Coordinates: 33°52′44″N 93°55′7″W

Information
- School type: Public
- School district: Dierks School District
- CEEB code: 040640
- Principal: Scott Feemster
- Teaching staff: 56.42 (on FTE basis)
- Grades: 7–12
- Enrollment: 239 (2023–2024)
- Student to teacher ratio: 4.24
- Colors: Blue and white
- Mascot: Outlaw
- Team name: Dierks Outlaws
- Website: www.dierksschools.org

Dierks High School is a public high school in Dierks, Arkansas, United States, that serves more than 250 students in grades 7 to 12. It is one of four public high schools in Howard County and the only high school managed by the Dierks School District.

== Academics ==
The assumed course of study is the Smart Core curriculum developed by the Arkansas Department of Education. Students may engage in regular and Advanced Placement (AP) coursework and exams prior to graduation. Dierks has been accredited by AdvancED (formerly North Central Association) since 1959.

The high school is listed unranked in the Best High Schools 2012 Report by U.S. News & World Report.

== Athletics ==
The Dierks High School mascot and athletic emblem are the Outlaws (a wild, unbreakable horse) with the school colors of blue and white.

The Outlaws American football team won a state football championship in 1975.

For 2012–14, the Dierks Outlaws participated in the 2A Classification in the 2A 7 (American football) and 2A 7 East (basketball) Conference for interscholastic activities administered by the Arkansas Activities Association including American football, golf (boys/girls), basketball (boys/girls), cheerleading, baseball, softball and track and field.

In 2025, Dierks High School was announced as the grand prize winner of T-Mobile's Friday Night 5G Lights competition, a national contest supporting small-town high school football programs. The initiative invited schools across the United States to apply and encouraged public voting. As the grand prize winner, Dierks High School will receive a complete football field renovation valued at over $1 million, provided by T-Mobile.
