= 2017 Payson flash floods =

July 2017 flood in Arizona, US

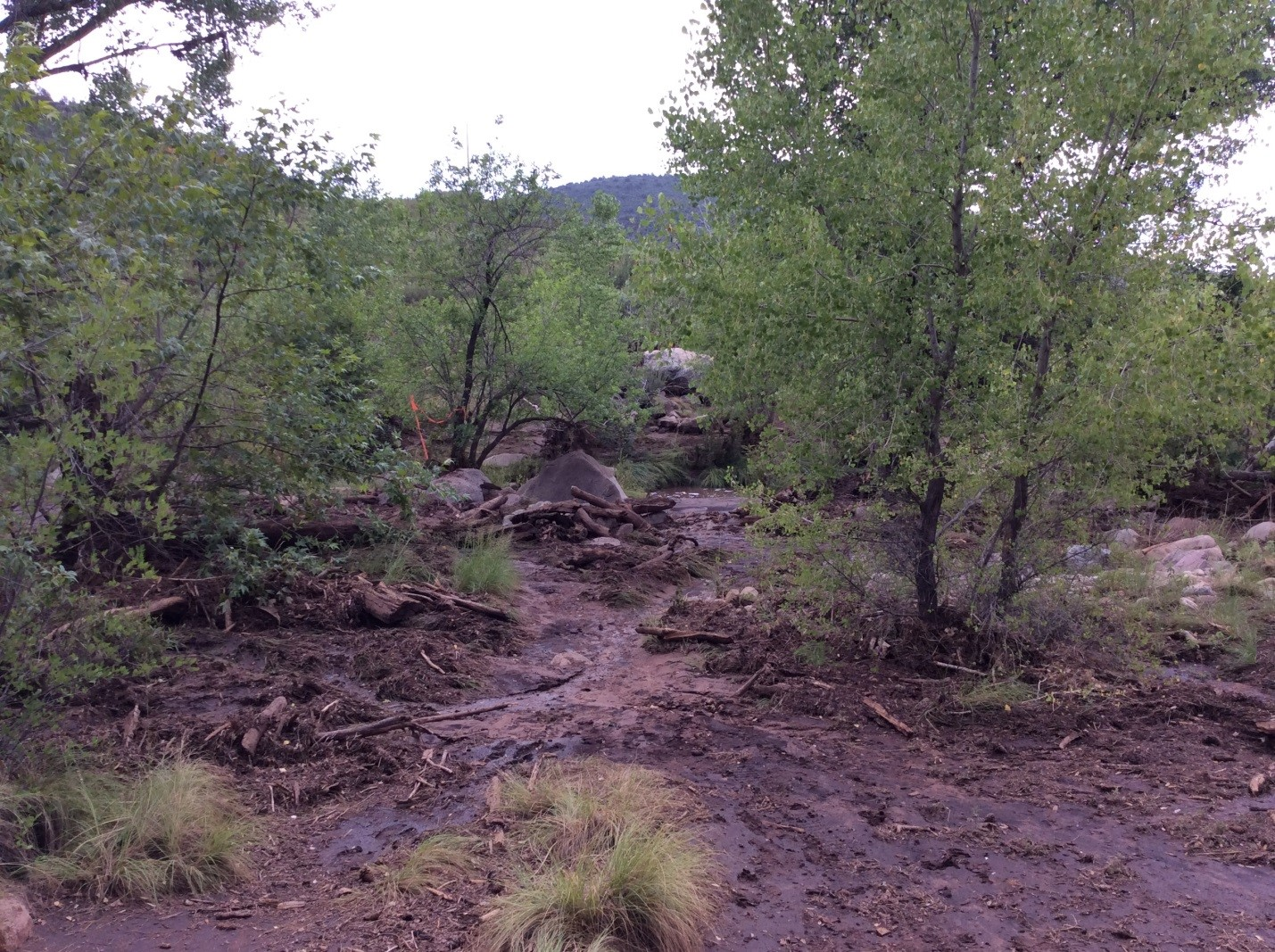
- Debris (logs and rocks) along the bank of the East Verde River after flood waters receded
- Date: July 15, 2017
- Location: Water Wheel Falls Hiking Trail near Payson, Arizona; 34°21′2″N 111°17′7″W
- Type: Flash flood
- Cause: Heavy rains, Wildfire burn scar
- Deaths: 10
- Injuries: 4

The 2017 Ellison Creek flooding or mostly known as the 2017 Payson flash floods occurred on July 15, 2017, near Payson, Arizona, in the Water Wheel Falls Hiking Trail in the Tonto National Forest that killed 10 members of an extended family. Before the flash floods, 10 of those people, and 4 others, were celebrating a birthday party.

== Causes ==
There were mainly two causes of the flash flood. A month earlier before the tragedy occurred, the Highline Fire, a raging wildfire that burned 7,000+ acres of land near Ellison Creek, which created a mixture of ash and logs that were in the flood waters on the day of the disaster. Another cause that might have been the main culprit for the tragedy was that even though there was a flash flood warning issued for the area, in the people's remote spot they did not get the warning.

== Flood ==
On the day of July 15, 2017, an extended family of 14 were celebrating a birthday party at the Cold Springs Swimming Hole in the Water Wheel Falls Hiking Trail. The weather was cloudy and calm with some heavy rains throughout the day with temperatures reaching 90 °F (32 °C). Besides the family of 14, many other people were also at Water Wheel Falls Hiking Trail to relax and swim in cold waters in the area. Hours earlier, heavy rains hit the area as part of the North American Monsoon, which hits the Southwestern U.S. every year between June and mid-September. At around 3 p.m. (MST), many of the people, including children, were swimming in the waters of the canyon when all of a sudden they hear a loud prolonged sound. When the people looked upstream, they saw a large wall of black muddy water rushing towards them. The water was carrying rocks and large logs the size of cars. The flood waters were approximately 6-foot tall and 40-feet wide. The flood swept away many of the swimmers while many other people were holding onto trees waiting to be rescued. The floods eventually moved into the East Verde River.

Video of flash flood on Youtube
- Video shows the flood flowing through Ellison Creek, by Trent Shue (Uploader), Tonto Recreation Alliance (Original Owner)

=== Search ===
While the waters of the flood were damaging everything in its path, 911 dispatchers were called and helicopters were needed to be used to rescue the people struggling to stay alive. Many of the people were later rescued. After the flood event, searches for the missing were conducted. Many family members of the missing arrived on scene and were worried that their relatives didn't make it. In the following days, an announcement was made that search crews found 9 bodies and 1 was still missing. The missing person named Hector Garnica was found days later, deceased.

== Aftermath ==
As a result, the flood event left 10 people dead (half of them children) and 4 people were injured. A funeral was held for the people who died in the flood. The cost of damages is unknown. Years later, family members of the victims had filed a lawsuit against the U.S. Government for wrongful death, negligence, and negligent infliction of emotional distress.

== Gallery ==
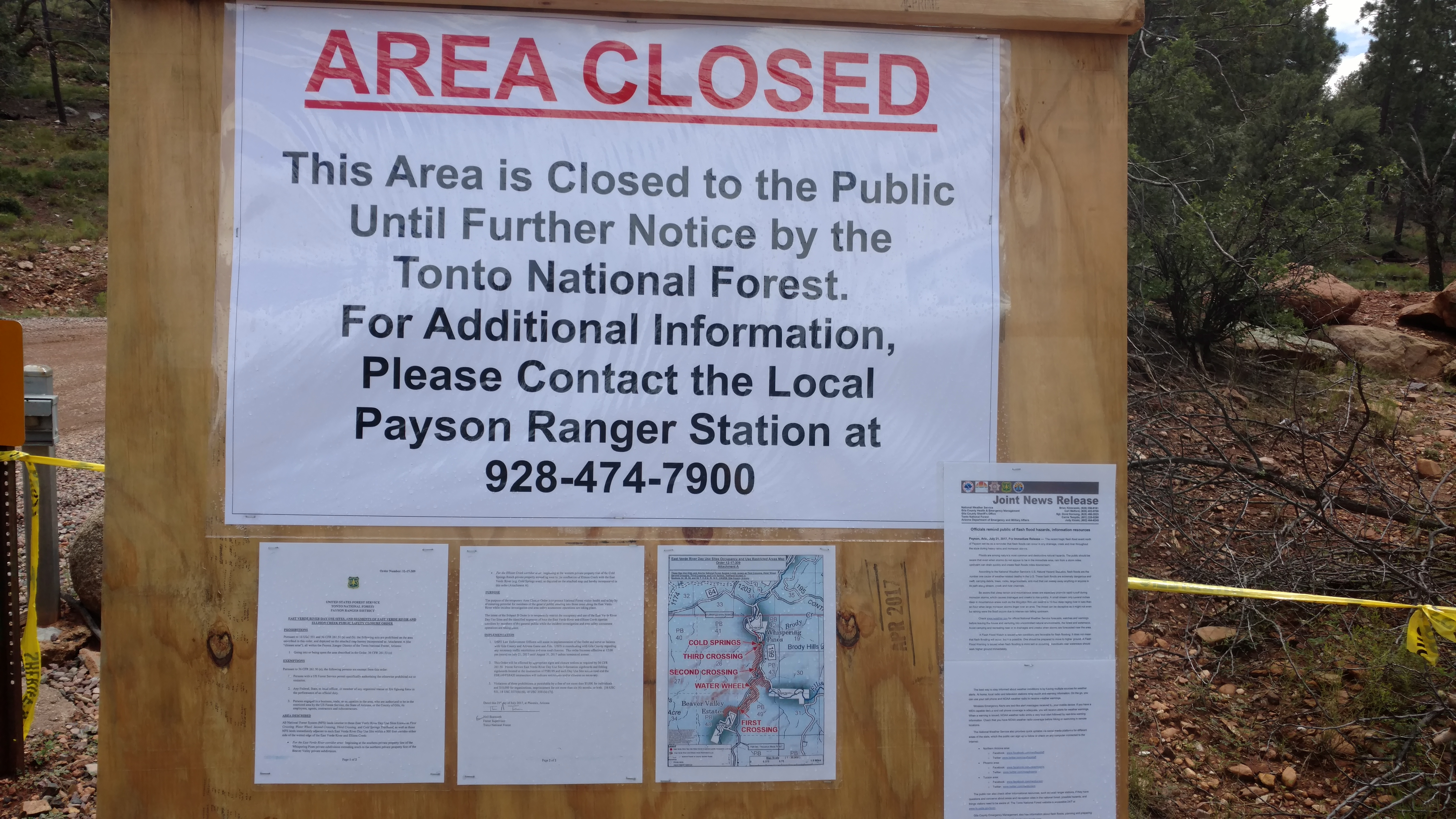
Closure sign in front of the entrance to the Cold Springs Swimming Hole after flash floods

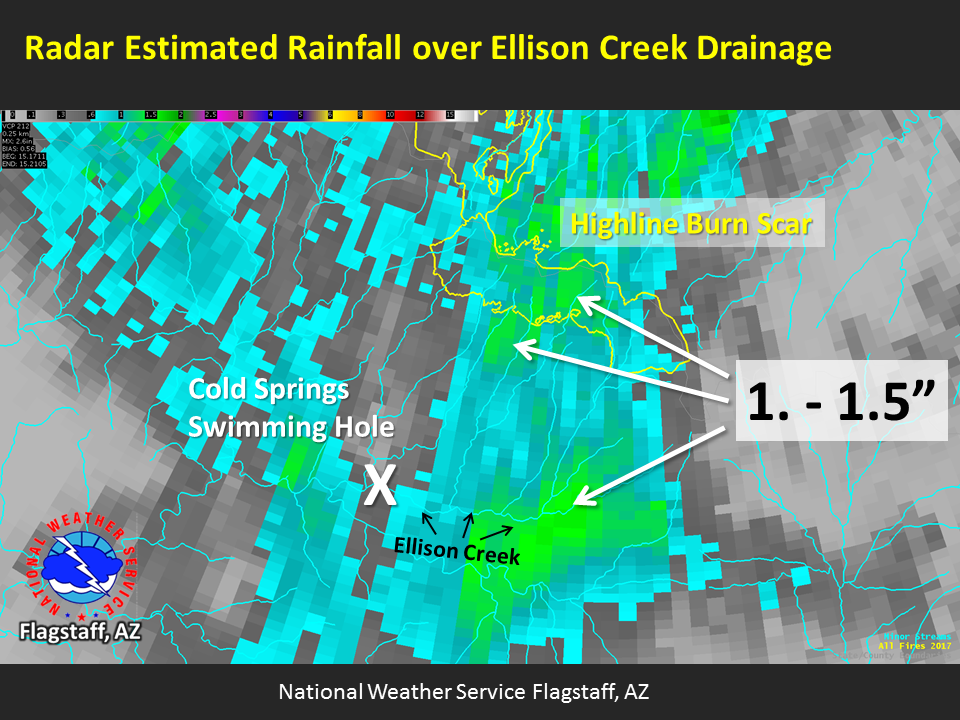
Heavy rains that hit the areas of Ellison Creek and the Cold Springs Swimming Hole hours before the flash floods occurred

== See also ==
- List of natural disasters in the United States
