= Willamette Valley flood of 1996 =

Series of floods in the Pacific Northwest of the United States, particularly in Oregon

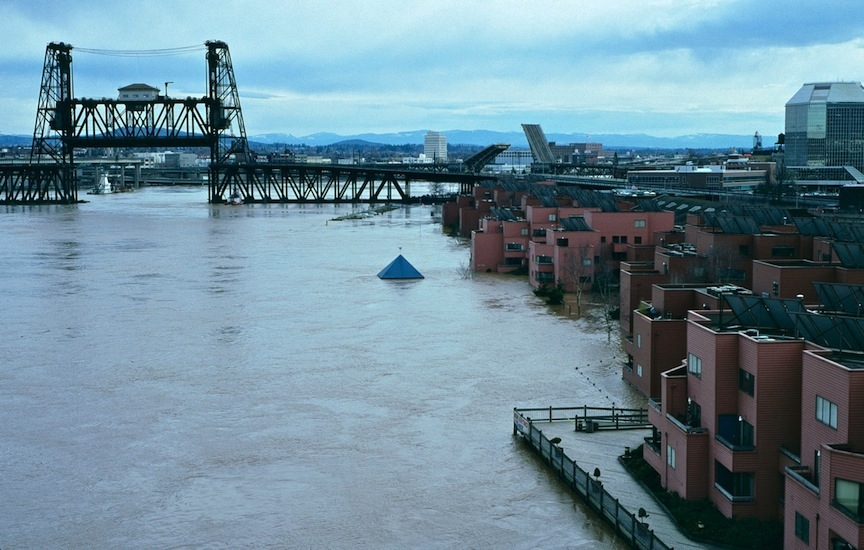
Flooding just north of downtown Portland in February 1996, viewed looking southeast towards the Steel Bridge

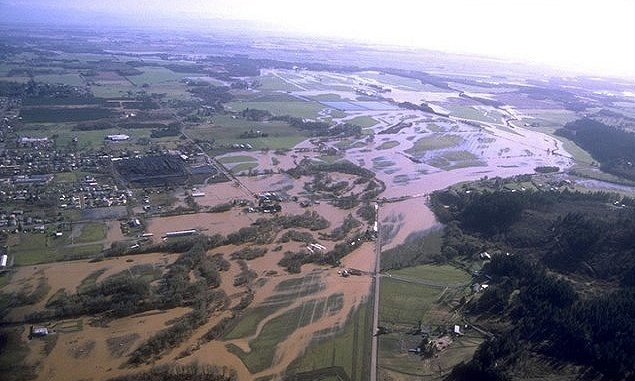
An aerial view of the Willamette River's flood

The Willamette Valley flood of 1996 was part of a larger series of floods in the Pacific Northwest of the United States which took place between late January and mid-February 1996. It was Oregon's largest flood event in terms of fatalities and monetary damage during the 1990s. The floods spread beyond Oregon's Willamette Valley, extending west to the Oregon Coast and east toward the Cascade Mountains. Significant flood damage also impacted the American states of Washington, Idaho (particularly the north of the state) and California. The floods were directly responsible for eight deaths in Oregon, as well as over US$500 million in property damage throughout the Pacific Northwest. Three thousand residents were displaced from their homes.

== Causes ==
An unusual confluence of weather events made the floods particularly severe. The winter preceding the floods had produced abnormally high rainfall and relatively low snowfall. The heavy rains saturated ground soil and raised river levels throughout January 1996. In late January, a heavy snowstorm padded snow packs throughout the region. This was followed by a deep freeze that lasted for six to ten days. The new layer of snow was quickly melted by a warm subtropical jetstream which arrived on February 6. The jetstream brought along further rains. The combination of the additional rain, the saturated ground, and the melting snow packs engorged dozens of streams and tributaries, which in turn flooded into the region's major rivers.

== Impacts ==
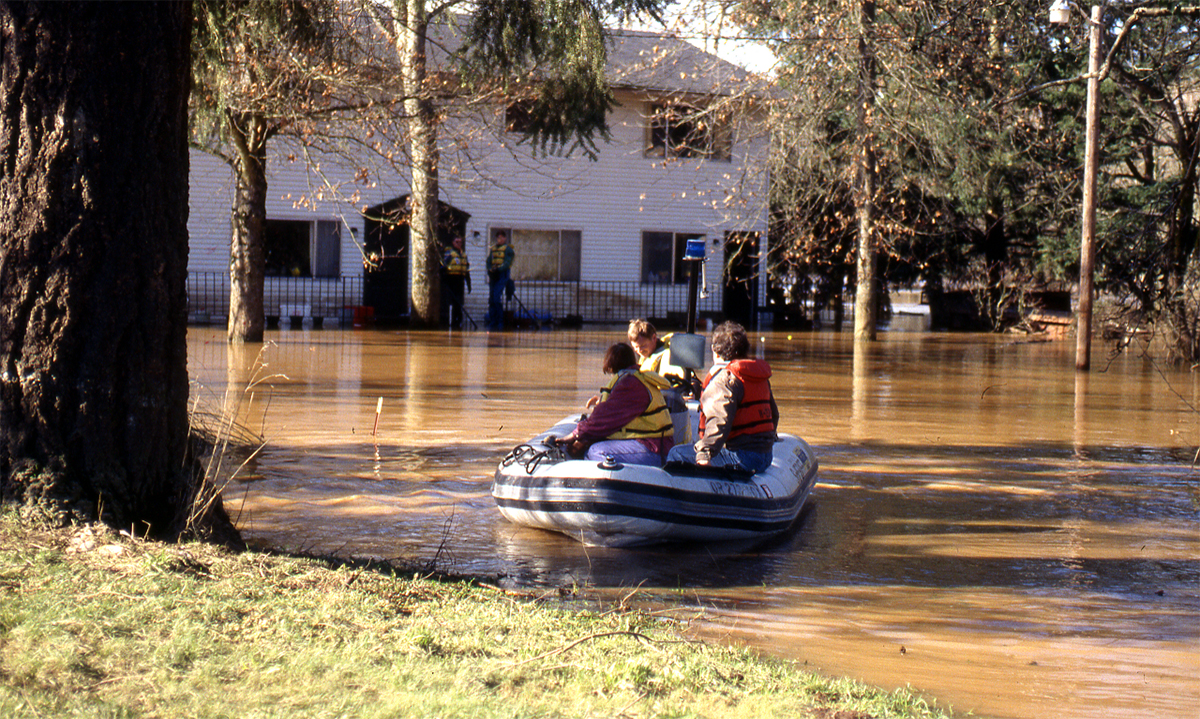
People using inflatable rafts as a means of transportation

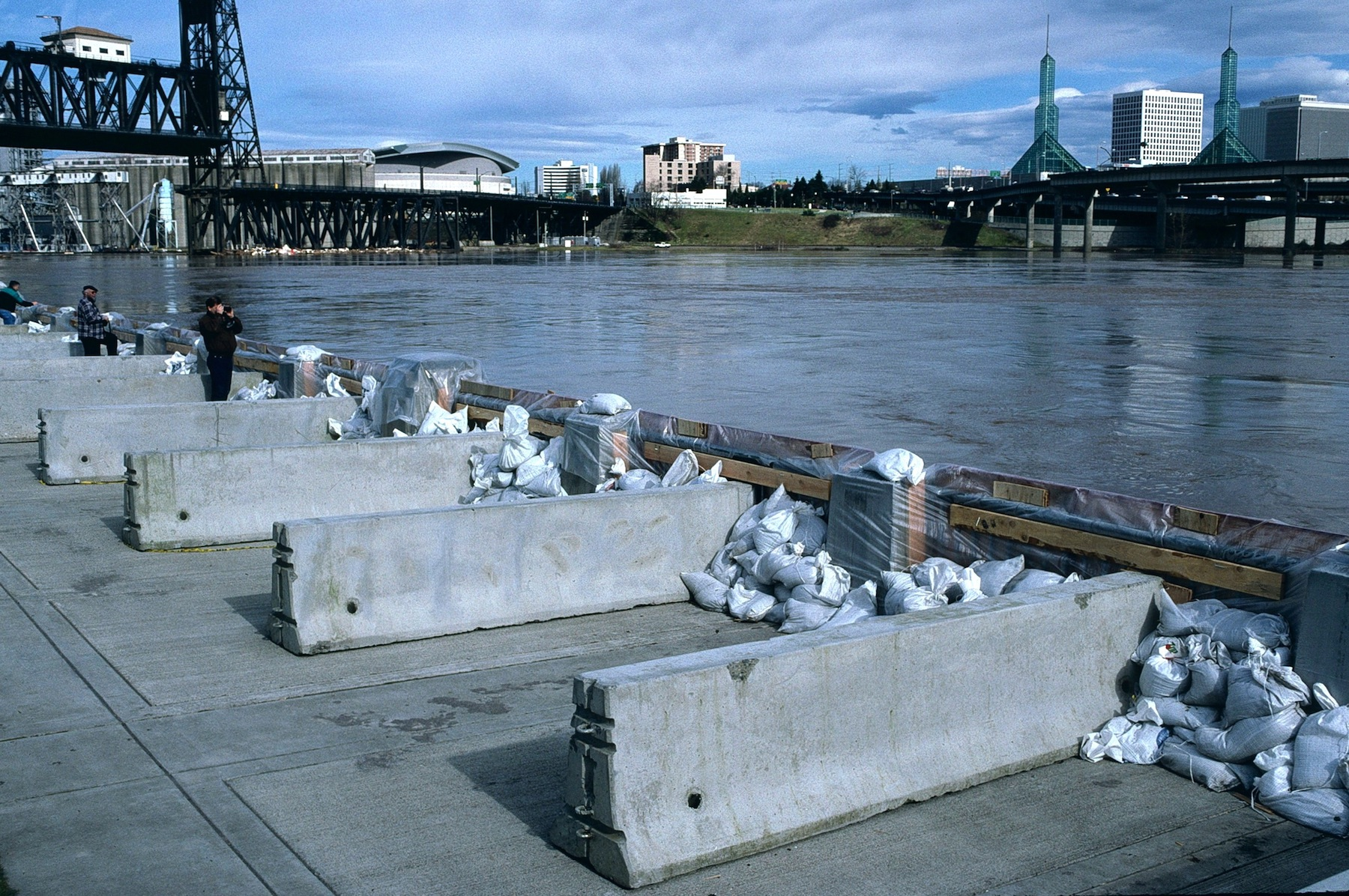
Temporary barriers and sandbags holding plywood panels in place at the seawall in downtown Portland

The Willamette River, which flows through downtown Portland, crested at 28.6 feet (8.7 m), some 10.6 feet (3.2 m) above flood stage. The river came within inches of flowing over its seawall and flooding a large portion of Portland's downtown Tom McCall Waterfront Park. A major sandbagging effort involving civilians as well as the Oregon National Guard was launched throughout downtown Portland and was maintained until the floodwaters began to recede on February 9. At least five rivers in Oregon crested at all-time highs during the floods.

The downtown areas of Oregon City and Tillamook suffered particularly heavy damage from the floods, and both were submerged for several days. Several houses in southwest Portland were also damaged by the heavy rainfall and a landslide caused one stretch of SW Fairmount Boulevard to be closed for several weeks.

== See also ==
- List of floods
- List of natural disasters in the United States
- List of rivers of Oregon
- Christmas flood of 1964
