= Caddo River =

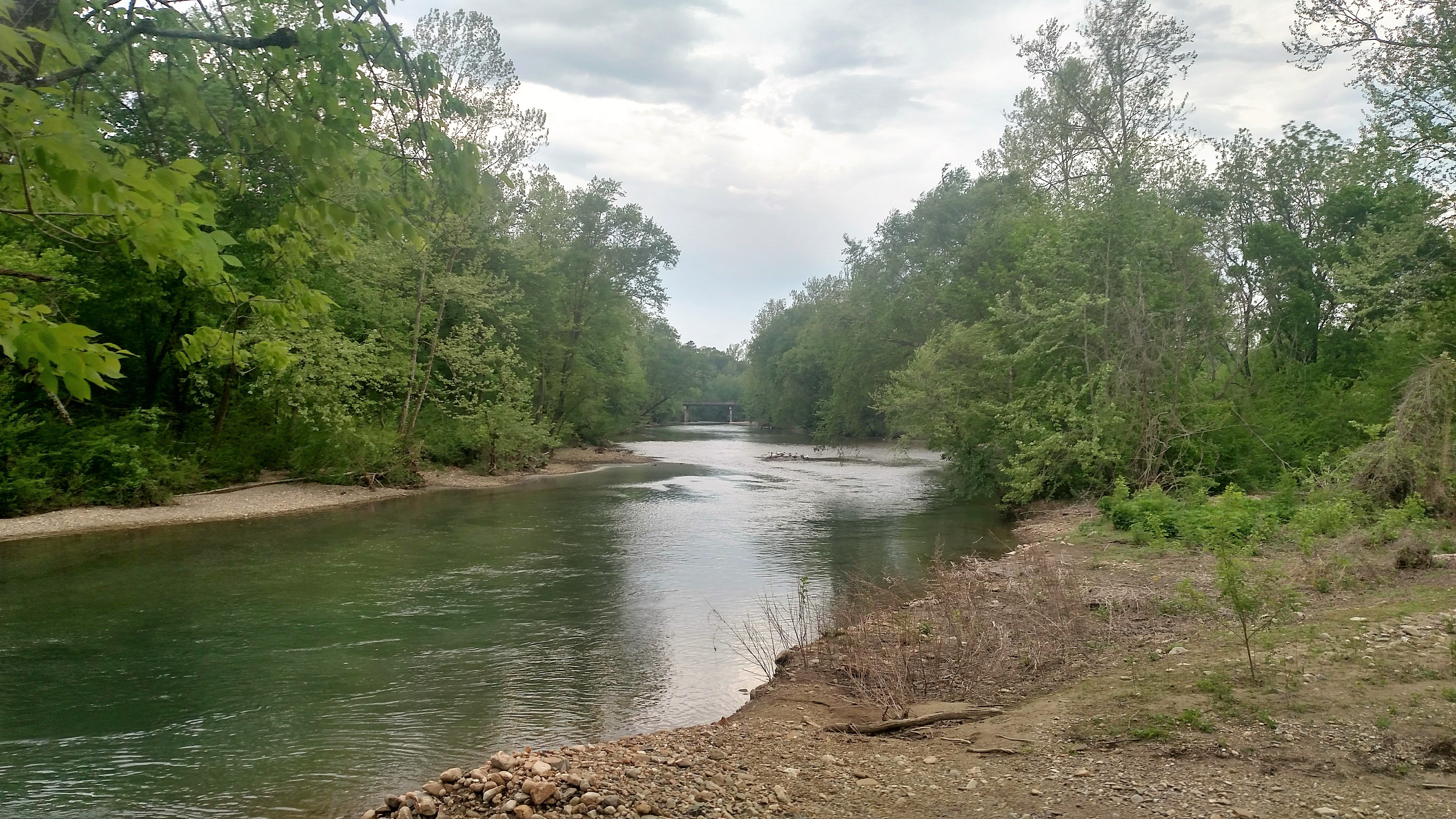
- Caddo River at Norman

- Location of the mouth of the Caddo River in Arkansas

Location
- Country: United States
- State: Arkansas

Physical characteristics
- Source: Caddo Mountains
  - location: Ouachita Mountains
  - coordinates: 34°27′9″N 93°55′22″W
  - elevation: 1,400 ft (430 m)
- Mouth: Ouachita River
  - location: near Arkadelphia, Arkansas
  - coordinates: 34°10′48″N 93°2′36″W
  - elevation: 144 ft (44 m)
- Length: 82 mi (132 km)
- Discharge
  - location: USGS gage 07359610, near Caddo Gap, AR
  - average: 267 cu ft/s (7.6 m^{3}/s)
  - minimum: 16 cu ft/s (0.45 m^{3}/s)
  - maximum: 28,600 cu ft/s (810 m^{3}/s)

The Caddo River is a tributary of the Ouachita River in the U.S. state of Arkansas. The river is about 82 miles (132 km) long.

== Course ==
The Caddo River flows out of the Ouachita Mountains through Montgomery, Pike, and Clark counties in Arkansas before flowing into DeGray Lake and then to its terminus at the Ouachita River north of Arkadelphia, Arkansas.

The upper Caddo is known as a good family canoeing river and is a popular destination for fishing. Smallmouth and spotted bass are found in quantity, as are longear and green sunfish. The lower course of the Caddo, below Degray Dam, is also a popular fishing and canoeing river, although the length of river remaining is only a few miles at that point.

Communities through which the Caddo River passes are:

- Black Springs, Arkansas
- Norman, Arkansas
- Caddo Gap, Arkansas
- Glenwood, Arkansas
- Amity, Arkansas
- Caddo Valley, Arkansas
- Arkadelphia, Arkansas

== Flood of 2010 ==
On the night of June 11, 2010, between 200 and 300 campers awoke to rapidly rising water, as a flash flood along the Caddo and Little Missouri Rivers killed twenty people.

== Etymology ==
The Caddo River is named for the Caddo Native American tribes that, at one time, lived along its banks.

== See also ==
- List of rivers of Arkansas
