= Little Missouri Falls =

Coordinates: 34°25′18″N 93°55′8″W

- Interactive map of Little Missouri Falls
- Location: Arkansas, United States

The Little Missouri Falls is a sizable waterfall on the upper reaches of the Little Missouri River in the Ouachita National Forest, Arkansas, United States. It is a stairstep fall in a deep gorge. The falls can be reached by an all-weather gravel road, and there is a parking area with restrooms and a paved trail leading to observation sites. Water flow is greatest during the winter and spring months.

== See also ==
- List of waterfalls
