= May 2025 Mid-Atlantic United States flood =

Natural disaster in the United States

Meteorological history
- Duration: May 13–May 18, 2025

Overall effects
- Fatalities: 1
- Areas affected: Maryland, North Carolina, Virginia, West Virginia, Pennsylvania, Washington, DC

A significant flood affected parts of the Mid-Atlantic region of the eastern United States in May 2025. A slow-moving weather system began in the southeast and moved north, causing flash flooding from western North Carolina and the Piedmont region of central Virginia to south-central Pennsylvania. Flooding occurred primarily in communities along the Potomac River and its tributaries, beginning on May 13.

== Meteorological history ==
A slow-moving atmospheric river began in the Southeast United States, resulting in up to a foot of rain in some areas of the Southeast. The atmospheric river was trapped in the Southeast for days due to a high pressure system in the north. The weather system began moving north, toward western North Carolina and Virginia. Much of the Mid-Atlantic was experiencing a drought, and when drought conditions combined with the heavy rainfall and thunderstorms from the atmospheric river it resulted in flash flooding throughout the region. The storm eventually moved to the Midwestern United States.

== Impact ==
=== District of Columbia ===
Flooding began occurring in Washington, D.C., on May 15 due to rising levels of the Potomac River and high tides. A coastal flood warning was in place along the Potomac shoreline, with 2–3 ft (0.61–0.91 m) of flooding expected in areas along the river, including the Georgetown neighborhood. Flooding submerged the boardwalk in Washington Harbour and Wisconsin Avenue was in the minor flood stage.

Little Falls, a rapids located at the borders of the District of Columbia, Maryland, and Virginia, was also in a minor flood stage on May 15, with 10 ft (3.0 m) of flooding.

=== Maryland ===
On May 13, the majority of flooding in Maryland occurred in Allegany County, in the Georges Creek Valley region. Georges Creek, a tributary of the Potomac River, rose more than 7 ft (2.1 m) in six hours, reaching a moderate flood level at 12.12 ft (3.69 m) by 5 p.m. The record flood level for the area occurred in 1996, when the creek reached a flood level of 12.77 ft (3.89 m). A flash flood warning was issued for Westernport and Barton on May 13. In Westernport, a town that is prone to flooding, an elementary school was flooded. Fifteen rescue boats were used to evacuate approximately 150 students and 50 staff members from the school. Children from the school reported that the floodwaters had nearly reached the first floor ceiling by the time they were evacuated. News coverage showed several cars floating in the school parking lot. No injuries were reported from the elementary school, and no other schools in the area were impacted. There were additional reports of individuals trapped in cars and homes. A flash flood warning was also issued for Grantsville, Maryland, as moderate rain showers headed north, with some areas receiving three to four inches of rain. Streets in Cumberland were flooded, with vehicles floating in water at about knee-depth.

On Thursday, May 15, in Point of Rocks, the Potomac's levels reached a major flood stage at 21.5 ft (6.6 m) by 4:45 a.m., beginning to submerge comfort stations and threaten parking areas at boat ramps. Water levels in Point of Rocks had not reached this level since 1910. In Poolesville, Maryland, floodwaters reached 19.1 ft (5.8 m) at the Edwards Ferry boat ramp on Thursday morning. Flood warnings remained in effect for many locations along the Potomac, including Hancock due to additional forecasted rainfall.

=== New Jersey ===
On May 14, several locations in New Jersey received over 3 in (76 mm) of rain. Additional rain fell on May 15 across the state, and a tornado was even recorded.

=== North Carolina ===
Parts of western North Carolina, including areas recently damaged by Hurricane Helene, were placed under a flood watch. Boone received more than five inches of rain in some areas. Flooded roadways were reported in Boone, Cabarrus County, Valle Crucis, Seven Devils, Foscoe, and Burke County. The flooding was primarily due to rising flood levels for the North and South Fork New River, the Watauga River, and Wilson Creek.

=== Pennsylvania ===
Heavy rainfaill in south-Central Pennsylvania resulted in rising water levels for Conodoguinet Creek, a tributary of the Susquehanna River. By 5:30 a.m. on May 15, the water stage was just below flood stage at 7.9 ft (2.4 m). In Somerset County, some streets were flooded. Flash flood warnings were initially issued for northeastern Adams County, south-central Cumberland County, and west-central York County, but were canceled later in the day. On May 16, police and firefighters in West Chester, performed five water rescues of individuals trapped in cars dure to flooding.

=== Virginia ===
On May 13, the National Weather Service issued a flash flood warning for Augusta, Nelson, and Albemarle counties at 4:26 p.m. that was to remain in effect until 10:30 p.m., with the county receiving between 4–6 in (100–150 mm) of rain from the night of Monday, May 12 through the night of Tuesday, May 13. On Tuesday afternoon, levels for the Mechums River began to rise at a rate of one foot per hour, reaching five feet above flood stage by midnight. At approximately 5:30 p.m. on May 13, less than an hour after the flash flood warning was issued, a 12-year-old boy named Jordan Sims was swept away by floodwaters after a nearby creek in Albemarle County overtook the roadway he walked on. After receiving a 9-1-1 call, search and rescue teams searched for approximately three hours before pausing the search due to visibility concerns. Flood waters receded considerably overnight, and rescuers resumed their search in the morning, and recovering Sims's body at approximately 8:45 a.m. on May 14.

On May 15, a flood warning was issued for Fauquier and Prince William counties due to small stream flooding near Cedar Run. Floodwaters impacted roads throughout the area, including Route 806. Flood warnings were also issued for Fairfax County, Montgomery County, and Loudoun County until at least the morning of May 17. As of May 15, the water already on the ground was creating dangerous conditions in the areas.

The Hampton Roads region received a severe thunderstorm watch, but did not experience significant flooding.

=== West Virginia ===
On May 13 Keyser and Piedmont, West Virginia, were issued flash flood warnings in the early evening. Heavy rainfall caused flash flooding in Keyser and other areas of Mineral County by late that night, with Governor Patrick Morrisey declaring a state of emergency for the county. Parts of West Virginia Route 46 were covered with rocks and debris, and other roads in the area were damaged. Basements of some residential buildings were flooded, though the majority of the damage was to roads, a school, and the local Walmart. Only one person had to be rescued on the 13th, and there were no reported injuries.

On May 15, flood warnings remained in effect for many locations along the Potomac due to additional forecasted rainfall, including Shepherdstown and Harpers Ferry.

== See also ==
- Floods in the United States
- 2006 Mid-Atlantic United States flood
