= Newhope, Arkansas =

- Census-designated place
- Location within Arkansas Location within the United States
- Coordinates: 34°13′43″N 93°52′18″W
- Country: United States
- State: Arkansas
- County: Pike
- Elevation: 692 ft (211 m)

Population (2020)
  - Total: 169
- Time zone: UTC-6 (Central (CST))
  - Summer (DST): UTC-5 (CDT)
- ZIP code: 71959
- Area code: 870
- GNIS feature ID: 2805667

Newhope is an unincorporated community and census-designated place (CDP) in Pike County, Arkansas, United States. Newhope is located at the junction of U.S. Route 70 and Arkansas Highway 369, 8 miles (13 km) west of Daisy. Newhope has a post office with ZIP code 71959.

It was first listed as a CDP in the 2020 census with a population of 169.

== Demographics ==
Historical population
Census	Pop.	Note	%±
2020	169		—
U.S. Decennial Census; 2020

=== 2020 census ===
Newhope CDP, Arkansas – Demographic Profile (NH = Non-Hispanic) Note: the US Census treats Hispanic/Latino as an ethnic category. This table excludes Latinos from the racial categories and assigns them to a separate category. Hispanics/Latinos may be of any race.
Race / Ethnicity	Pop 2020	% 2020
White alone (NH)	149	88.17%
Black or African American alone (NH)	0	0.00%
Native American or Alaska Native alone (NH)	2	1.18%
Asian alone (NH)	0	0.00%
Pacific Islander alone (NH)	0	0.00%
Some Other Race alone (NH)	0	0.00%
Mixed Race/Multi-Racial (NH)	14	8.28%
Hispanic or Latino (any race)	4	2.37%
Total	169	100.00%

Note: the US Census treats Hispanic/Latino as an ethnic category. This table excludes Latinos from the racial categories and assigns them to a separate category. Hispanics/Latinos can be of any race.
