= Dierks, Arkansas =

- City
- Location of Dierks in Howard County, Arkansas.
- Coordinates: 34°7′11″N 94°1′3″W
- Country: United States
- State: Arkansas
- County: Howard

Government
  - Mayor: Ronnie Cogburn

Area
  - Total: 1.92 sq mi (4.97 km^{2})
  - Land: 1.92 sq mi (4.97 km^{2})
  - Water: 0 sq mi (0.00 km^{2})
- Elevation: 443 ft (135 m)

Population (2020)
  - Total: 916
  - Estimate (2025): 879 ▼
  - Density: 477.3/sq mi (184.28/km^{2})
- Time zone: Central
  - Summer (DST): Central
- ZIP code: 71833
- Area code: 870
- FIPS code: 05-18970
- GNIS feature ID: 2404228

Dierks is a city in Howard County, Arkansas, United States. The population was 916 as of the 2020 census, down from 1,133 in 2010.

== History ==
Dierks was formerly known as "Hardscrabble.” It was changed to "Dierks" after Hans Dierks, the oldest of four brothers who owned the Dierks Lumber and Coal Company. In 2007, Dierks celebrated the 100th anniversary of its founding.

=== 2009 tornado ===
Severe thunderstorms that moved through southwest Arkansas on April 9, 2009, produced an EF3 tornado that destroyed the city's water treatment plant. A training technician from the Arkansas Rural Water Association helped the utility operators establish a temporary connection to the neighboring Nashville Rural Water System until the National Guard could deliver a pair of portable water purification systems. The Boy Scouts of America helped distribute water to families.

=== 2019 Flood ===
Flash flooding in July 2019 provided Dierks with 17 inches of rain in less than 24 hours causing extensive flooding and damage to many local residents’ houses, businesses, and personal property. No injuries or deaths were reported.

=== 2024 Wildfire ===
On October 29, 2024, a semi-truck trailer dragging chains along Highway 278 created sparks igniting a grass fire that spread rapidly. The fire, which started 2.1 miles southeast of Dierks near Green Plains Rd, quickly engulfed over 150 acres of forestry spanning over 2 miles from Green Plains Rd to Fellowship Rd. Dierks, Centerpoint, Nashville, Umpire, and Nathan fire departments responded to the fire alongside Weyerhaeuser Dierks forestry Division, containing it within 7 hours. Surrounding counties sent water trucks and volunteers to help with containment efforts. No structures were lost in the fires, and no deaths were reported.

== Geography ==
Dierks is located in north-central Howard County along the southern edge of the Ouachita Mountains. It sits in the valley of Holly Creek, a southwest-flowing tributary of the Saline River. U.S. Route 70 passes through the city on Front Street and Main Avenue, leading northeast 36 miles (58 km) to Glenwood and southwest 21 miles (34 km) to De Queen. U.S. Route 278 also passes through Dierks, leading north out of town along Main Avenue with US 70 before turning northwest towards Wickes, 32 miles (51 km) from Dierks. US 278 runs east out of Dierks on 4th Street and Massey Avenue, eventually traveling 19 miles (31 km) southeast to Nashville.

According to the United States Census Bureau, the city has a total area of 1.9 square miles (4.9 km^{2}), all land.

Dierks Lake is a reservoir on the Saline River seven miles northwest of the city limits. It is a popular fishing spot and offers three areas to camp include Jefferson Ridge, Blue Ridge, and Horseshoe Bend.

== Climate ==
The climate in this area is characterized by hot, humid summers and generally mild to cool winters. According to the Köppen Climate Classification system, Dierks has a humid subtropical climate, abbreviated "Cfa" on climate maps.

== Demographics ==
Historical population
Census	Pop.	Note	%±
1910	272		—
1920	1,495		449.6%
1930	1,544		3.3%
1940	1,459		−5.5%
1950	1,253		−14.1%
1960	1,276		1.8%
1970	1,159		−9.2%
1980	1,249		7.8%
1990	1,263		1.1%
2000	1,230		−2.6%
2010	1,133		−7.9%
2020	916		−19.2%
2025 (est.)	879	▼	−4.0%
U.S. Decennial Census

=== 2020 census ===
Dierks racial composition
Race	Number	Percentage
White (non-Hispanic)	793	86.57%
Black or African American (non-Hispanic)	5	0.55%
Native American	19	2.07%
Other/Mixed	32	3.49%
Hispanic or Latino	67	7.31%

As of the 2020 United States census, there were 916 people, 376 households, and 213 families residing in the city.

=== 2000 census ===
As of the census of 2000, there were 1,230 people, 465 households, and 349 families residing in the city. The population density was 660.2 inhabitants per square mile (254.9/km^{2}). There were 542 housing units at an average density of 290.9 per square mile (112.3/km^{2}). The racial makeup of the city was 95.93% White, 0.57% Black or African American, 1.14% Native American, 0.08% Asian, 1.46% from other races, and 0.81% from two or more races. 1.95% of the population were Hispanic or Latino of any race.

There were 465 households, out of which 32.5% had children under the age of 18 living with them, 63.9% were married couples living together, 6.9% had a female householder with no husband present, and 24.9% were non-families. 22.4% of all households were made up of individuals, and 13.8% had someone living alone who was 65 years of age or older. The average household size was 2.56 and the average family size was 2.96.

In the city, the population was spread out, with 25.1% under the age of 18, 8.3% from 18 to 24, 26.7% from 25 to 44, 19.8% from 45 to 64, and 20.1% who were 65 years of age or older. The median age was 38 years. For every 100 females, there were 85.8 males. For every 100 females age 18 and over, there were 85.3 males.

The median income for a household in the city was $27,900, and the median income for a family was $31,667. Males had a median income of $26,765 versus $18,125 for females. The per capita income for the city was $13,515. About 9.8% of families and 12.6% of the population were below the poverty line, including 14.5% of those under age 18 and 22.1% of those age 65 or over.

== Education ==
=== Public education ===
Public education for elementary and secondary students is primarily provided by the Dierks School District, which includes:

- JoAnn Walters Elementary School, serving prekindergarten through grade 6.
- Dierks High School, serving grades 7 through 12. The school's sports teams are the Outlaws, and the mascot is a horse. The school's colors are royal blue and white. Under the leadership of Coach Doug Norwood, the Outlaws were the 1975 Class B football state champions. The championship is the only state championship in the school’s history.

=== Public library ===
The Dierks Branch Library is a branch library of the Southwest Arkansas Regional Library system.

== Events ==
In honor of its logging heritage, Dierks holds the annual Pine Tree Festival the first weekend in August every year at Jack Clawson Memorial Park. Vendors set up booths, and there are games and activities throughout the weekend. There is a loader contest, BBQ cook-off, tractor show, car show, and talent show. The festival typically concludes with a concert featuring a country music singer or group.

Past performers have included Craig Morgan, Reba McEntire, Hank Williams, Jr., Skeeter Davis, Keith Whitley, John Anderson, Dan Seals, Mindy McCready, Vern Gosdin, Sherrie Austin, and the Bellamy Brothers.
