= Little Missouri River (Arkansas) =

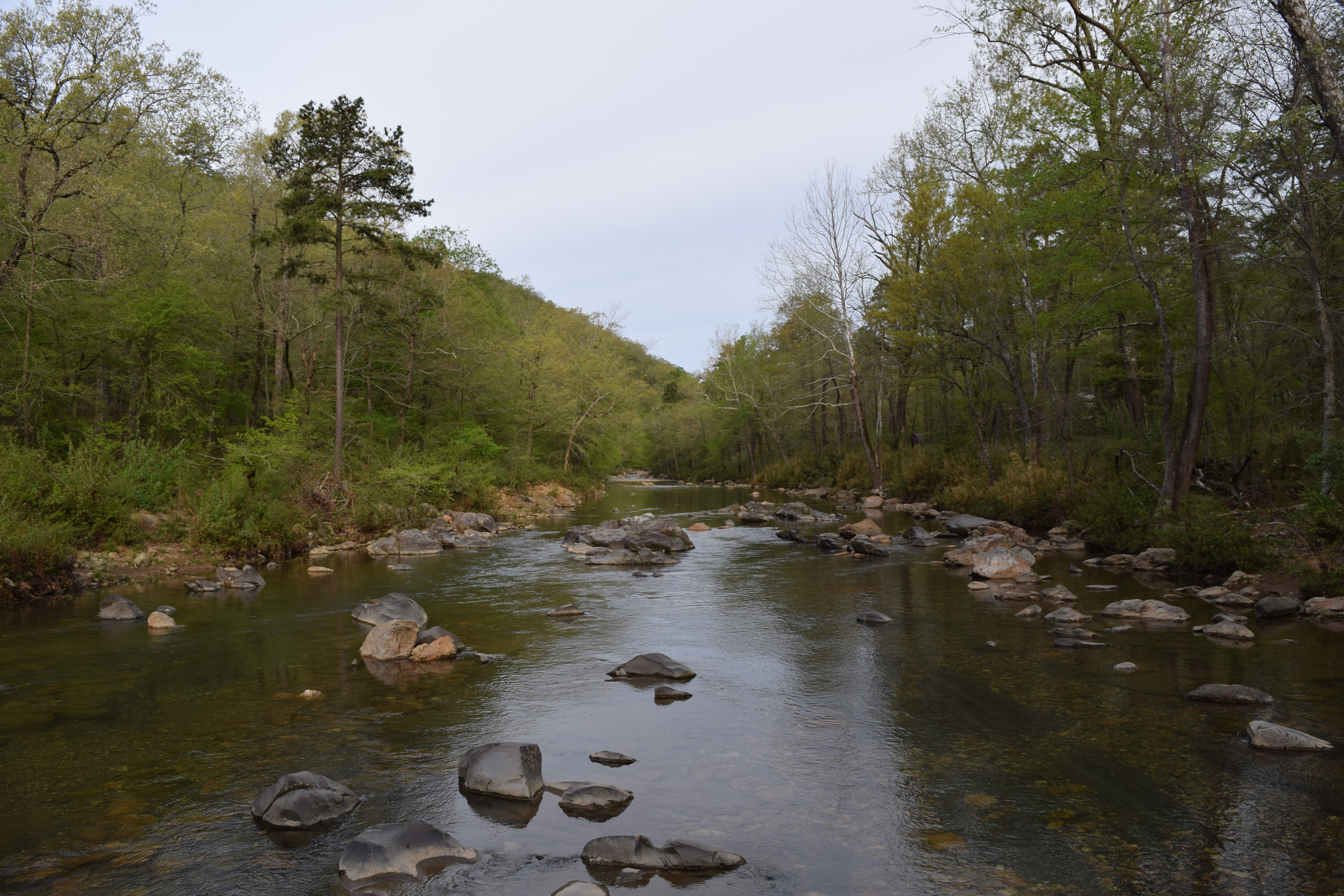
- Little Missouri River in Ouachita National Forest

Physical characteristics
- Length: 147 mi (237 km)
- Discharge
  - location: below the mouth of the Antoine
  - average: 430 cubic feet per second (12 m^{3}/s)
- Discharge
  - location: Langley, Arkansas
  - average: 152 cubic feet per second (4.3 m^{3}/s)

National Wild and Scenic River
- Type: Wild, Scenic
- Designated: April 22, 1992

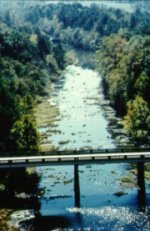
Lower stretch of Little Missouri River below Narrows Dam

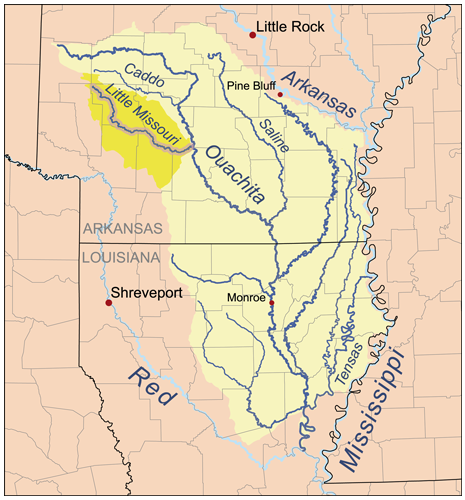
Location of the Little Missouri River within the Ouachita watershed.

The Little Missouri River, or Little Mo, is a 147-mile-long (237 km) waterway that runs from the Ouachita Mountains of southwest Arkansas into the rolling hills area in the surrounding countryside.

== Overview ==
The Little Missouri River is a rocky mountain river that flows through narrow forested canyons. This river has numerous small waterfalls, crystal clear water, and outstanding scenery including towering rocky bluffs crowned with pine.

The Little Missouri River was so named because its lower reaches were said to remind early French explorers of the Missouri River.

== Location ==
Mouth
Confluence with the Ouachita River in Ouachita County, Arkansas 33°48′30″N 92°54′01″W
Source
Mountains of Polk County, Arkansas 34°26′47″N 94°01′02″W

== Course ==
The Little Missouri flows in a generally north-to-south direction through Pike, Clark, and Montgomery on the western side of the Ouachita River. The Little Missouri River is south of, and runs parallel to, the Caddo River, before flowing into the Ouachita River near Tates Bluff, Arkansas. The largest tributary of the Little Missouri River is the Antoine River. The Little Missouri River is intermittently navigable to small boats below its confluence with the Antoine River, although it is rarely used.

The Little Missouri River is dammed by Narrows Dam and forms Lake Greeson. The upper stretches of the Little Missouri River above Lake Greeson descend 1,035 feet in 29 miles (315 m in 47 km) for an average drop of 35 feet per mile (6.6 m/km). This makes the upper waters of the river excellent for experienced canoers. There is a 4.4-mile (7.1 km) long segment that has been designated as a wild river. This segment contains the Winding Stair Rapid, which is classified as a Class IV rapid on the International Scale of River Difficulty. Another attraction on the upper river is Little Missouri Falls, a staircasestep fall that attracts photographers and visitors. The upper reaches of the Little Missouri were considered so scenic that the area was once approved by Congress to become Ouachita National Park, until this action was vetoed by President Herbert Hoover. The watershed of the Little Missouri River is quite small, which means that its upper reaches ordinarily contain little water during the dry summer months.

The Little Missouri River is a superior fishing stream for rainbow trout, green sunfish, longear sunfish, smallmouth bass, spotted bass, and other species. The area below the dam at Lake Greeson is most popular for trout fishermen.

Portions of the Little Missouri River flow through the Ouachita National Forest, and the lower segment flows past the Crater of Diamonds State Park. The Albert Pike Campground provides camping facilities for visitors to the area.

The Little Missouri is listed as a "Wild and Scenic River" by the United States Forest Service. The upper reaches of the river are designated as an "Arkansas Natural and Scenic River" by the State.

== History ==
The Little Missouri flows through territory once occupied by the mound-building Caddo people.

During the American Civil War the Battle of Elkin's Ferry was fought on the Little Missouri, 10 miles (16 km) north of Prescott, Arkansas, at the Clark-Nevada County line.

During the night of June 10–11, 2010 a flash flood along Little Missouri killed 20 people including 8 children who were camping in the campgrounds of the Albert Pike Recreational Area. Between 200 and 300 campers had woken to rapidly rising water, and in less than four hours, water rose from three feet (0.91 m) to over twenty-three feet (7.0 m)

== See also ==
- List of Arkansas rivers
