= Albert Pike Recreation Area =

Coordinates: 34°22′31″N 93°52′40″W

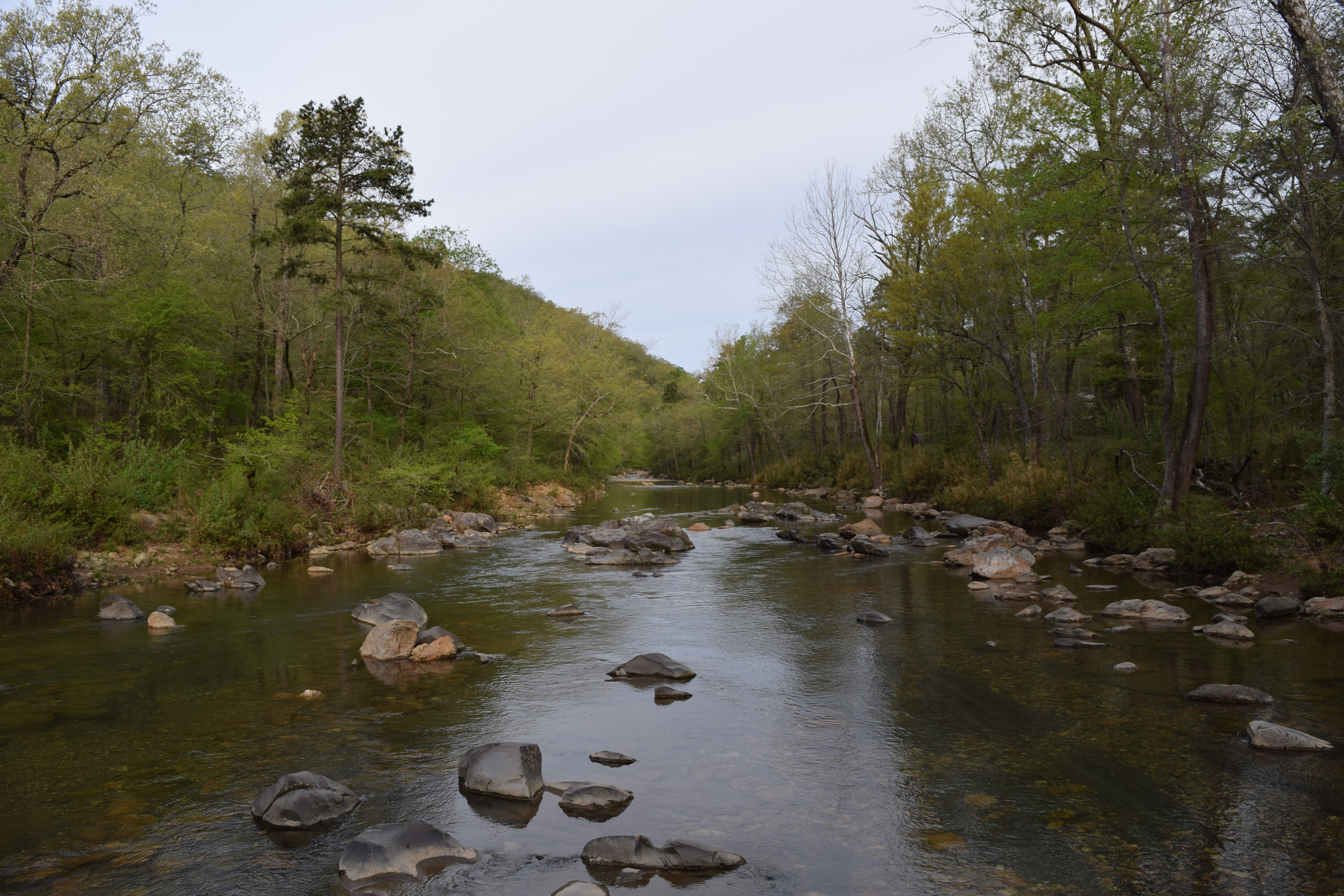
Little Missouri River in Albert Pike Recreation Area

Albert Pike Recreation Area is a recreational area located in the Ouachita National Forest about 6 miles north of Langley, Arkansas, in southern Montgomery County, featuring swimming and camping areas on the Little Missouri River.

== Flooding tragedy ==
During the night of June 10–11, 2010 a flash flood along Little Missouri River killed 20 people in the campgrounds of the Albert Pike Recreation Area. In a matter of less than four hours water rose from three feet to over twenty-three feet. Since that time the U.S. Forest Service has closed the site for further evaluation.

On July 20, 2018, the United States Court of Appeals for the Eighth Circuit upheld the dismissal of a lawsuit against the federal government relating to this incident, on the grounds that the suit was barred by the Federal Tort Claims Act. To wit, the Court ruled that the government could not be considered negligent in allowing visitors to camp overnight on a previously-known 100-year floodplain (occupied by Loop D, the site of most of the deaths), since "camping within a 100-year floodplain is not an uncommon recreational activity" and the June 10–11 flood was unquestionably a catastrophic 500-year flood event that would have posed a "ultra-hazardous condition" regardless of any attempts to mitigate or warn against the known 100-year flood risk at Loop D.
