= Langley, Arkansas =

Unincorporated community in Arkansas, United States

Coordinates: 34°18′46″N 93°50′31″W

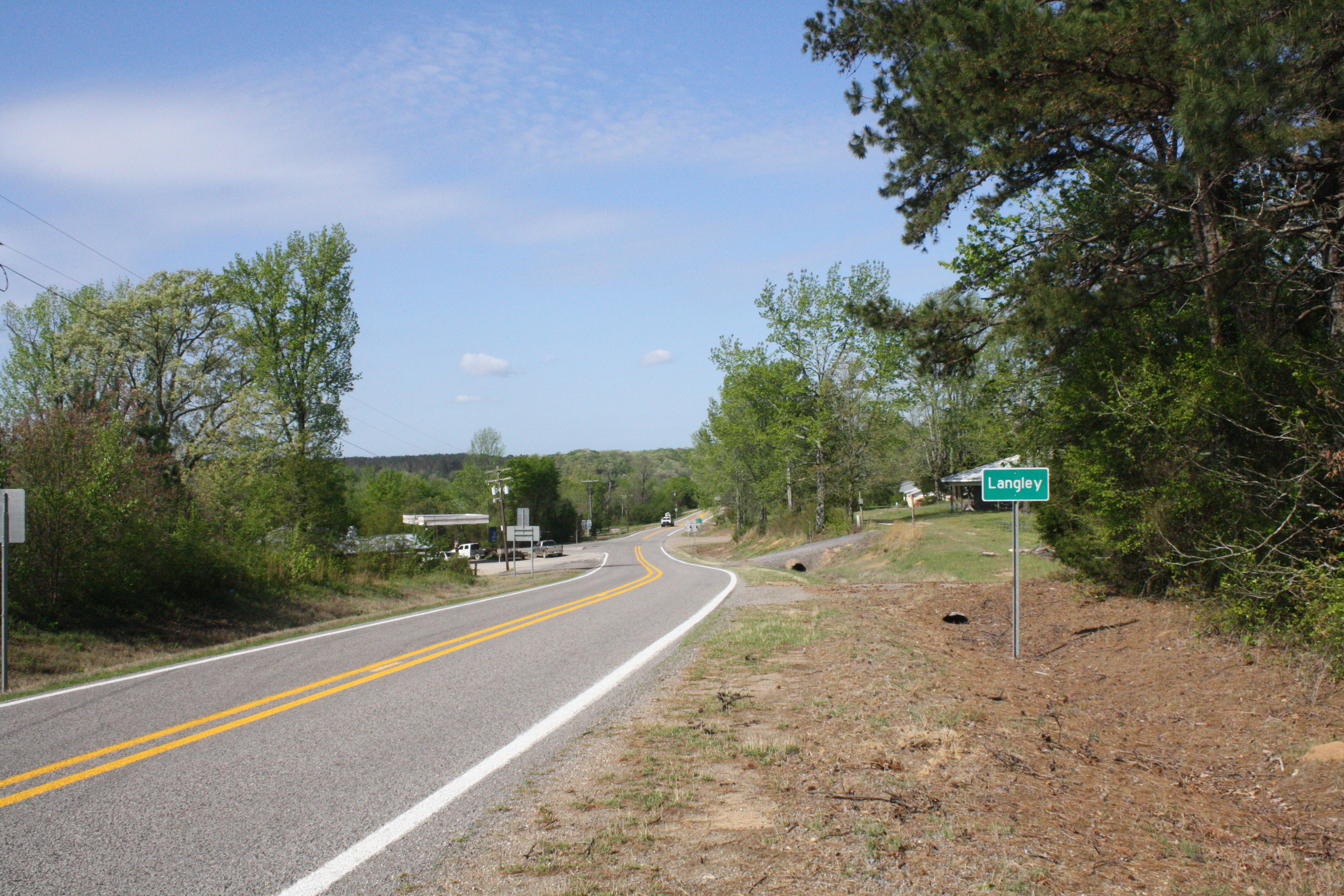
Sign for Langley along AR 84

Langley (also known as Lindon) is an unincorporated community in Pike County, Arkansas, United States. It is about 42 miles southeast of Mena, Arkansas, and is served by Arkansas Highway 84 (east-west) and Arkansas Highway 369 (north-south).
