= U.S. Route 71 =

US highway that goes from Ontario, Canada to Louisiana, United States

U.S. Route 71
- US 71 highlighted in red

Route information
- Length: 1,532 mi (2,466 km)
- Existed: 1926–present

Major junctions
- South end: US 190 west of Krotz Springs, LA
- I-20 from Bossier City to Shreveport, LA; I-30 in Texarkana, TX-AR; I-40 in Alma, AR; I-49 in Pineville, MO; I-44 in Joplin, MO; I-29 / I-35 / I-70 in Kansas City, MO; I-80 / US 6 near Atlantic, IA; I-90 in Jackson, MN; I-94 in Sauk Centre, MN; US 2 in Bemidji, MN
- North end: Highway 71 to Highway 11 / TCH at the Canadian border in International Falls, MN

Location
- Country: United States
- States: Louisiana, Texas, Arkansas, Missouri, Iowa, Minnesota

Highway system
- United States Numbered Highway System; List; Special; Divided
← US 70	→ US 72

U.S. Route 71 or U.S. Highway 71 (US 71) is a major north–south United States highway that extends for over 1500 miles (2500 km) in the central United States. This original 1926 route has remained largely unchanged by encroaching Interstate highways. Currently, the highway's northern terminus is in International Falls, Minnesota at the Canada–US border, at the southern end of the Fort Frances-International Falls International Bridge to Fort Frances, Ontario. U.S. Route 53 also ends here. On the other side of the bridge, Trans-Canada Highway (Ontario Highway 11) is an east–west route while Ontario Highway 71 is a north–south route. US 71's southern terminus is between Port Barre and Krotz Springs, Louisiana at an intersection with U.S. Route 190. For the entirety south of Kansas City, Missouri, US 71 runs parallel and concurrent with the existing and future Interstate 49. North of Kansas City, US 71 runs halfway between Interstate 29 and Interstate 35, which split in the city at an interchange with Interstate 70.

== Route description ==
=== Louisiana ===
The southern terminus of US 71 is located in Louisiana, beginning between Port Barre and Krotz Springs, at an intersection with U.S. 190. The highway follows a northwesterly course through Louisiana, passing through the communities of Alexandria, Montgomery, Coushatta, and Shreveport. From its southern terminus to Shreveport, US 71 has largely been superseded by Interstate 49 - which is eventually planned to roughly follow the US 71 alignment as far north as Kansas City, Missouri. After Shreveport, US 71 follows a northerly course, crossing into Arkansas just north of Ida, Louisiana.

=== Arkansas and Texas ===
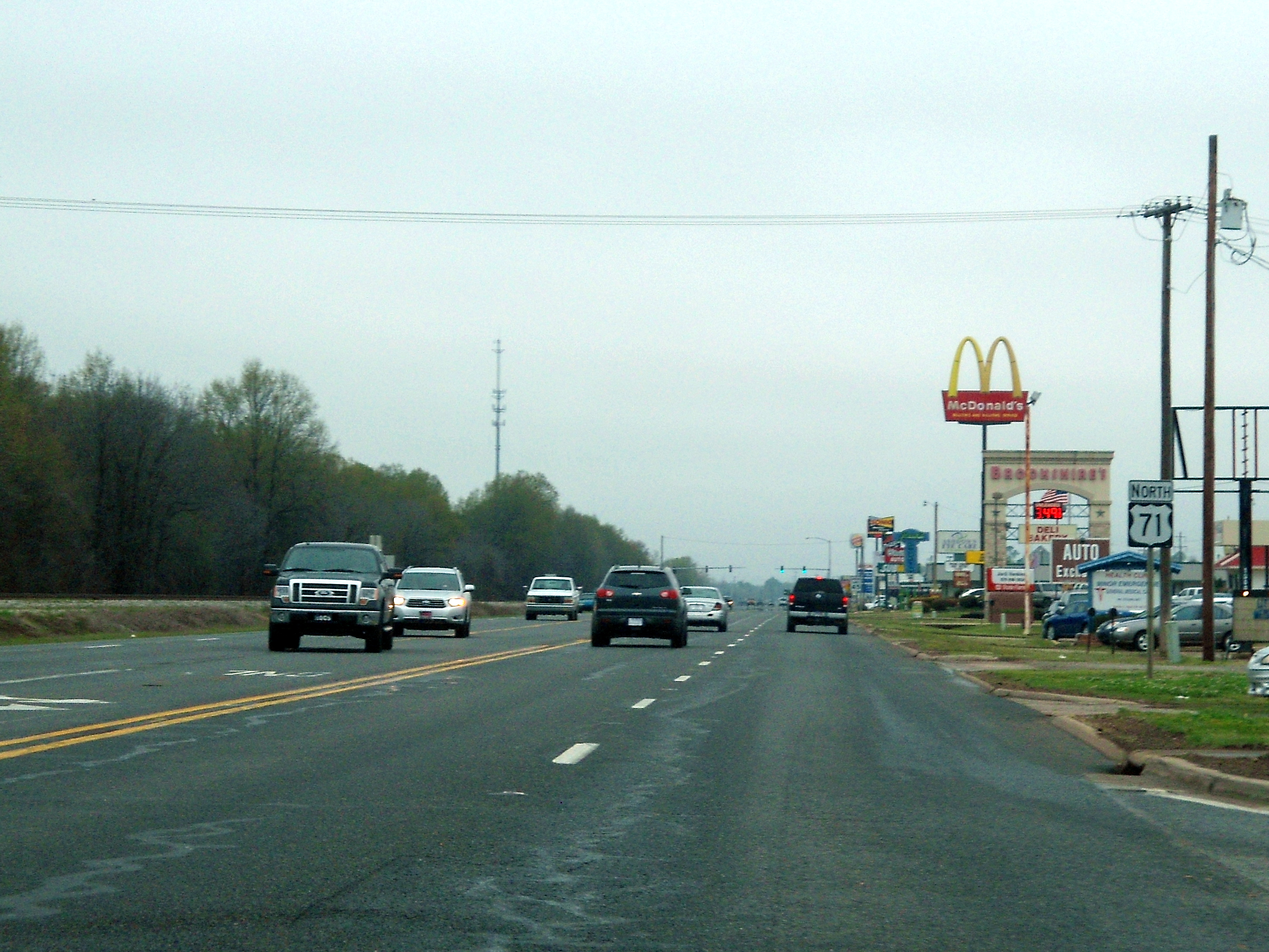
US 59/US 71 in Ashdown

US 71 travels approximately 300 miles (480 km) in Arkansas, entering the state approximately 1 mile (1.6 km) north of Ida, Louisiana.

The route enters Arkansas near the Red River, and runs north through the communities of Doddridge and Fouke. Most motorists can now bypass US 71 from Doddridge to Texarkana via Interstate 49. After approximately 30 miles (48 km) of paralleling I-49, the route turns west, passes the historic Averitt House and enters Texarkana.

Inside the loop, Highway 71 becomes East Street, passing the Texarkana Country Club and Hobo Jungle Park before becoming Hickory Street in downtown Texarkana. The street is four-lane undivided, passing the Bottoms House and J. K. Wadley House before meeting US 67/US 82. US 71 forms a short, two-block concurrency with US 67/US 82 before turning north along Hazel Street. (Note: Although it is signed that US 71 is concurrent with US 67/US 82 until State Line Avenue, the Miller County Route and Section Map indicates that US 71 runs along Hazel Street, and a brief connector designated US 71Y (Section 3Y) connects US 67/US 82 to US 71 at Hazel Street along State Line Avenue.) This minor city street runs northwest to intersect State Line Avenue; at this point, the northbound lanes are in Arkansas, while the southbound lanes are in Texas. While on State Line Avenue, US 71 intersects Loop 14 before U.S. Route 59 joins US 71 at Interstate 30.

From Arkansas Highway 296 north of Texarkana to the Red River, US 71 runs concurrent with US 59 as an expressway. Except for the northbound lanes (which return to the Arkansas side just before the Red River), this section of 3.39 miles (5.46 km) is entirely in Texas. (Note: Map note: 3.39 mi. exception to Texas portion of US 71)

The highways re-enter Arkansas (specifically Little River County) completely at the Red River. US 59/US 71 serve as an eastern terminus for Highway 380 upon entering Ogden. Although US 59/US 71 bypass the community as a four-lane highway, the route formerly served Ogden as Grand Street, which as of 2011 retains original 1926 US 71 paving for some of its length. Further north the routes pass under Highway 32, which skirts the southern part of Ashdown. Serving Little River's county seat as Constitution Avenue, the routes become a five-lane road with center turn lane which passes within two blocks of the Little River County Courthouse. The routes intersect Highway 32B and Highway 108 before exiting town due north to Wilton. Following the Kansas City Southern Railroad tracks, US 59/US 71 enters Wilton, where it passes the S. S. P. Mills and Son Building, Highway 234, and the Texarkana and Fort Smith Railway Depot. Just north of town a former alignment comes into view briefly before the Mills Cemetery and the Sevier County line.

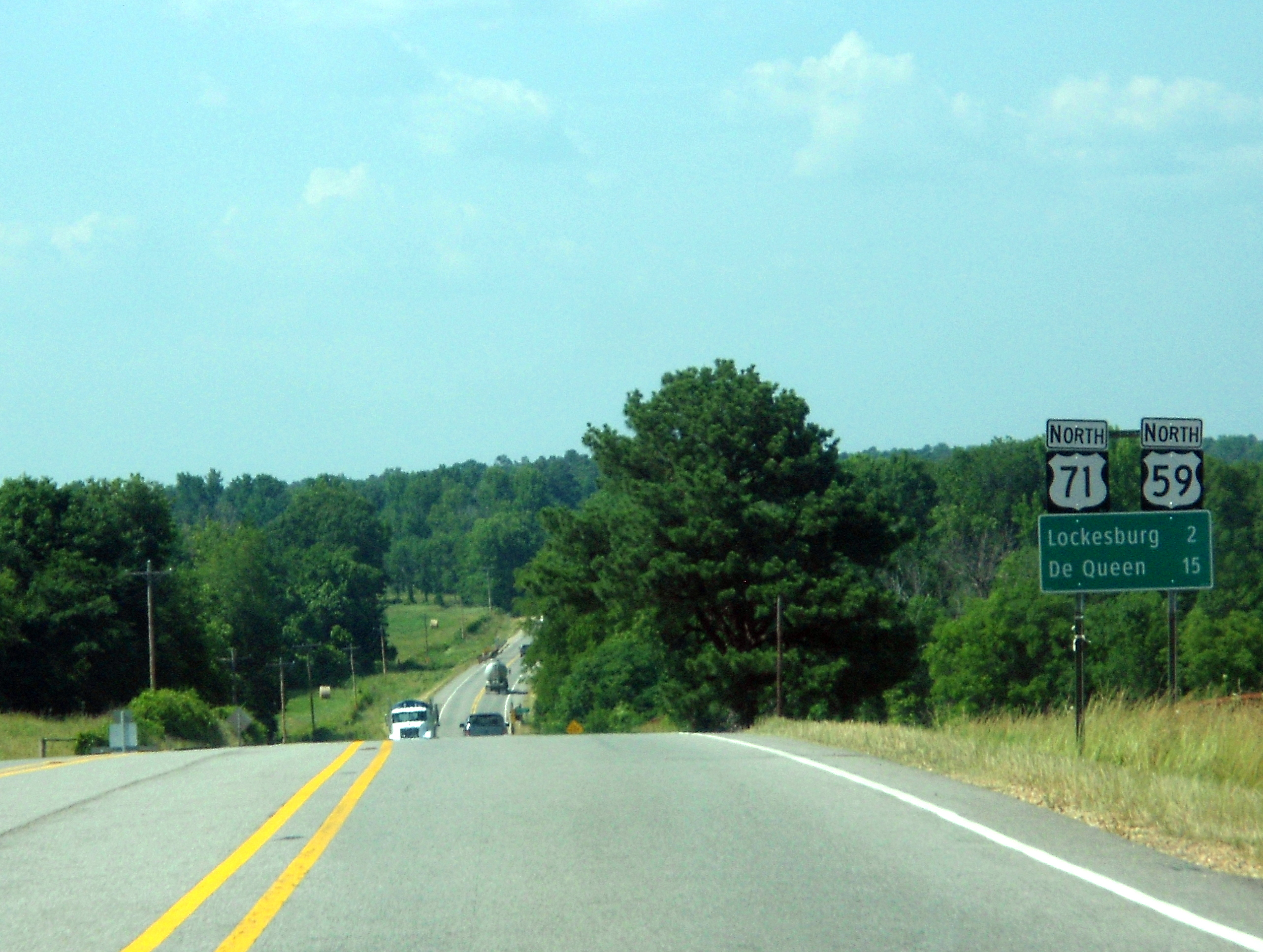
US 59/US 71 south of Lockesburg

Once across the Little River, US 59/US 71 passes another former alignment, crosses through Pond Creek National Wildlife Refuge, and runs east of Ben Lomond before entering Lockesburg. A junction in Lockesburg joins US 59/US 71 with US 371, with Highway 24 running west from the junction. 5 miles (8 km) north of Lockesburg US 70 joins US 59/US 71/US 371, and the concurrent routes turn west to De Queen. Upon entering De Queen, US 59/US 71 turns north, US 70 continues west, US 70 Business/Highway 41 (US 70B/AR 41) runs south, and US 371 terminates at the junction. US 59/US 71 continue through Gillham and Grannis to serve as the western terminus of US 278 in Wickes. Junctions with Highway 246 and Highway 4 precede the route entering Mena, the county seat of Polk County.

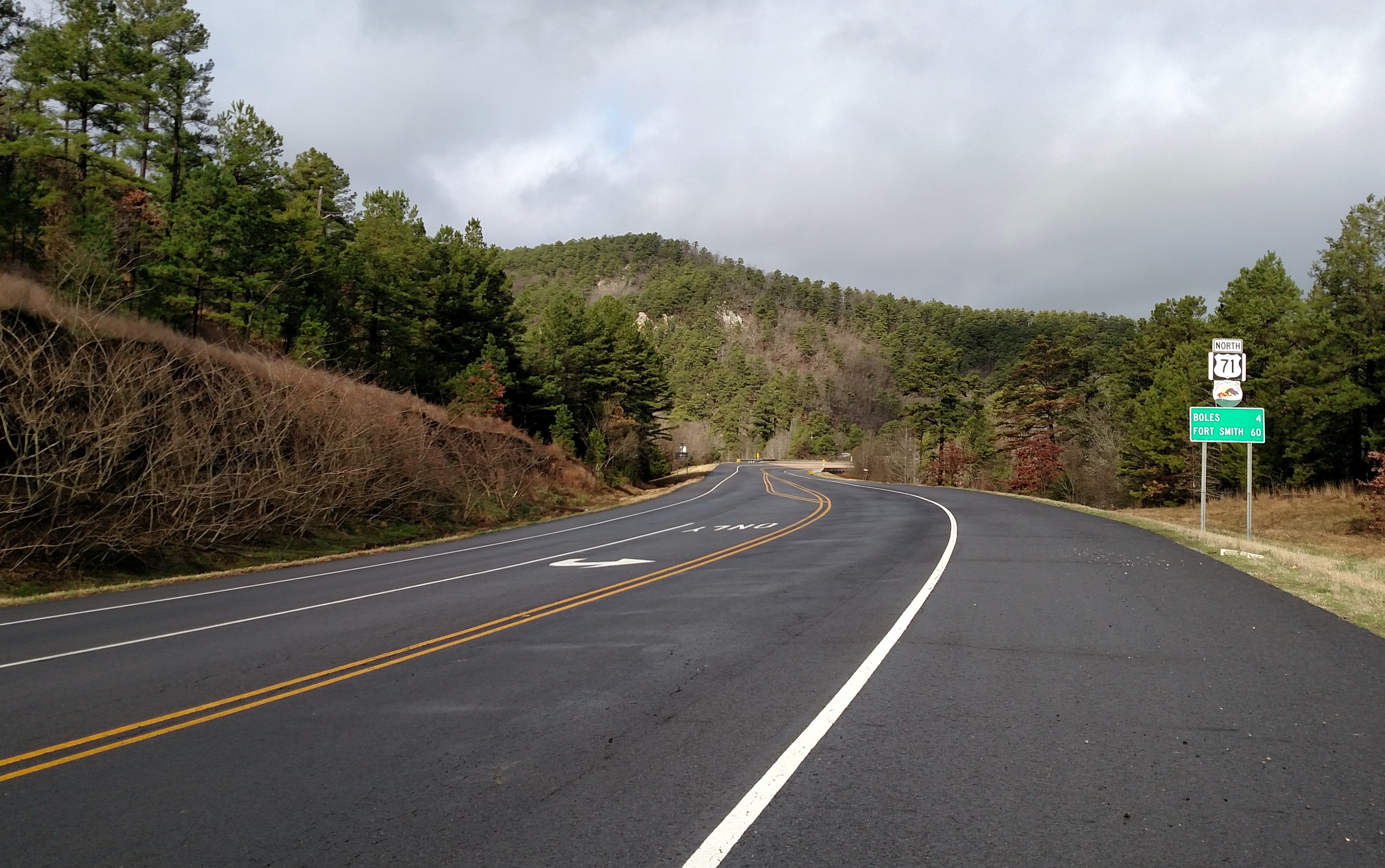
Highway 71 at Y City

In Mena, US 59/US 71 has a brief overlap with Highway 8, during which the routes pass two NRHP listings, the Kansas City-Southern Depot and the Mena Commercial Historic District. US 59/US 71/AR 8 also has an overlap with Highway 88, although the western end of the overlap serves as the eastern terminus of the Talimena Scenic Drive National Scenic Byway designation. After Highway 8 and Highway 88 have left the route US 59/US 71 run north to a junction with US 270 in Acorn. At a fork in the road, US 59 splits onto US 270 west, and US 270 east begins a concurrency with US 71 northbound into Ouachita National Forest. US 71/US 270 continue into Scott County to Y City, where the concurrency ends and US 270 turns east. US 71 runs north through the forest to Waldron, a town the mainline route bypasses to the west while US 71B runs through downtown Waldron. While skirting Waldron, US 71 has a junction with Highway 272 near Waldron Municipal Airport as well as junctions with Highway 248, Highway 80, and Highway 28. This section of US 71 from north of Mena through Fayetteville (following the original section's bypassing by the new Interstate 540(now Interstate 49)) has been designated a scenic byway and the Boston Mountains Scenic Loop.

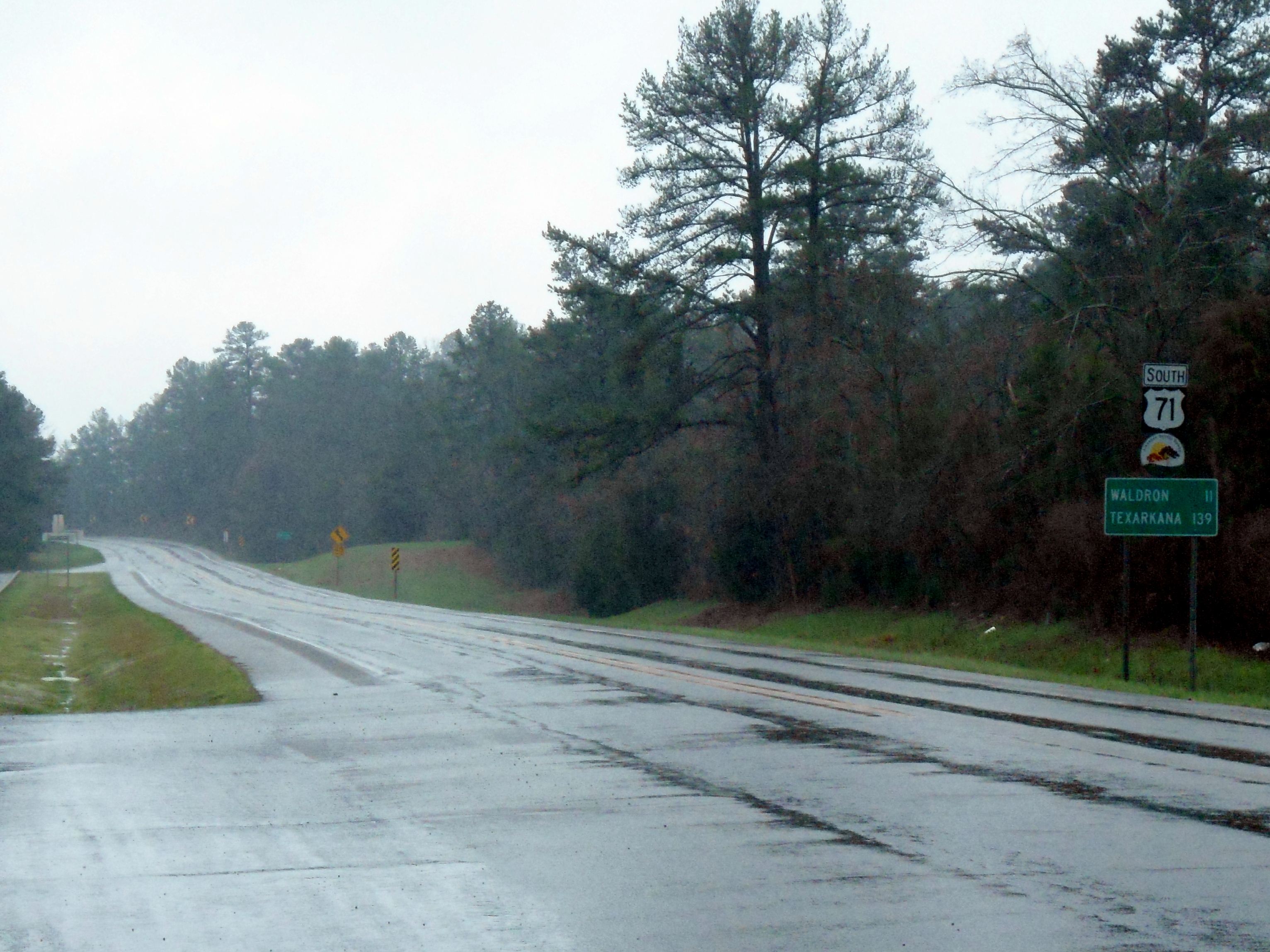
First reassurance marker south of the Highway 23 junction in Scott County

North of Waldron, US 71 passes through Mansfield and Greenwood before intersecting with Interstate 540 on the south end of Fort Smith. US 71 overlaps I-540 for approximately 12 miles (19 km) until it reaches Interstate 40, then follows I-40 6 miles (10 km) to Alma.

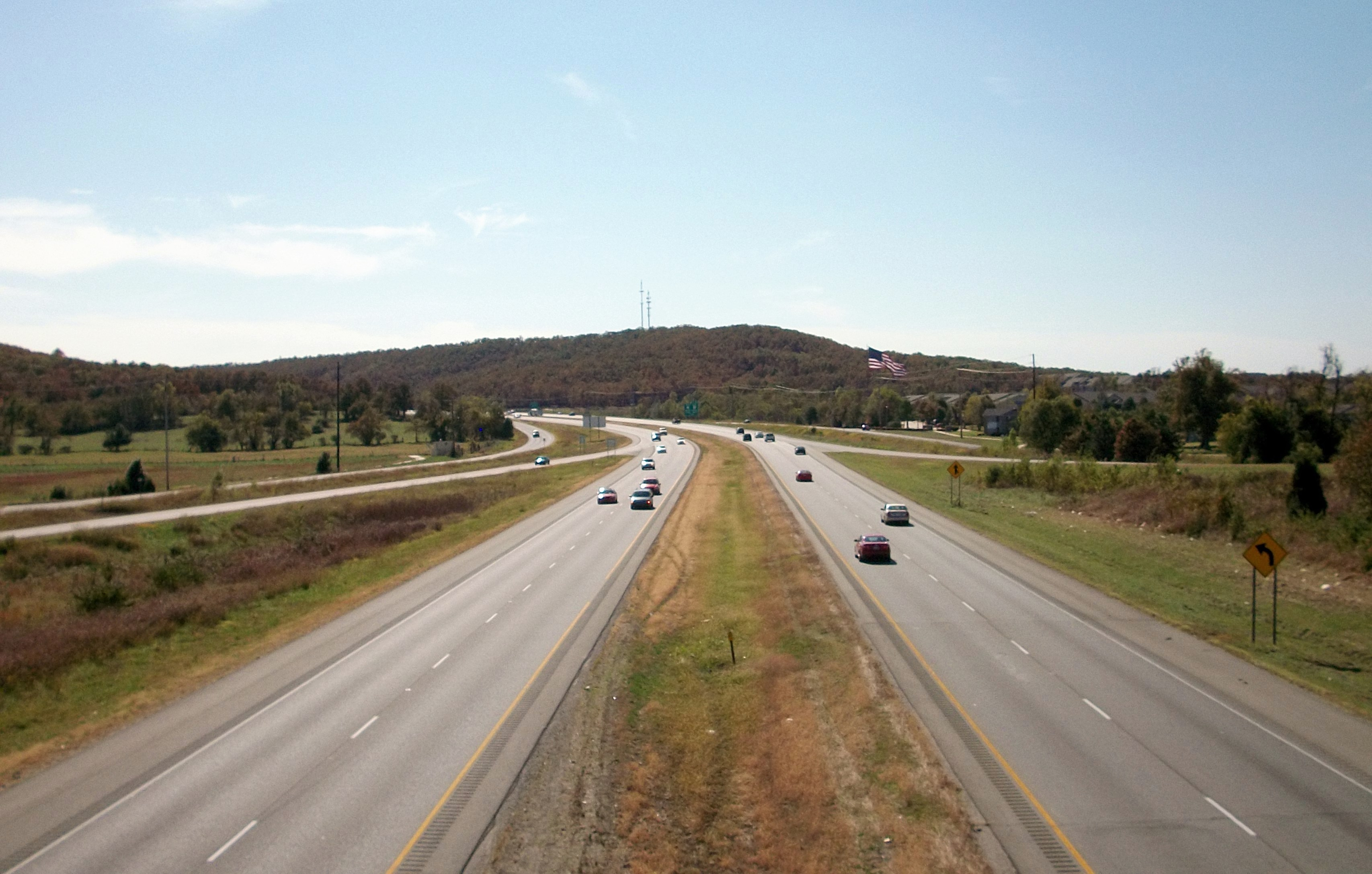
U.S. Route 71 is concurrent with Interstate 49 in northwest Arkansas.

US 71 passes through Mountainburg, Winslow, West Fork and Greenland on its way to Fayetteville. At Fayetteville, US 71 continues north to the missouri state line just north of Bentonville, as well as U.S. Route 62.

North of Bentonville US 71 continues another 12 miles (19 km) passing through Bella Vista to the Missouri state line.

=== Missouri ===
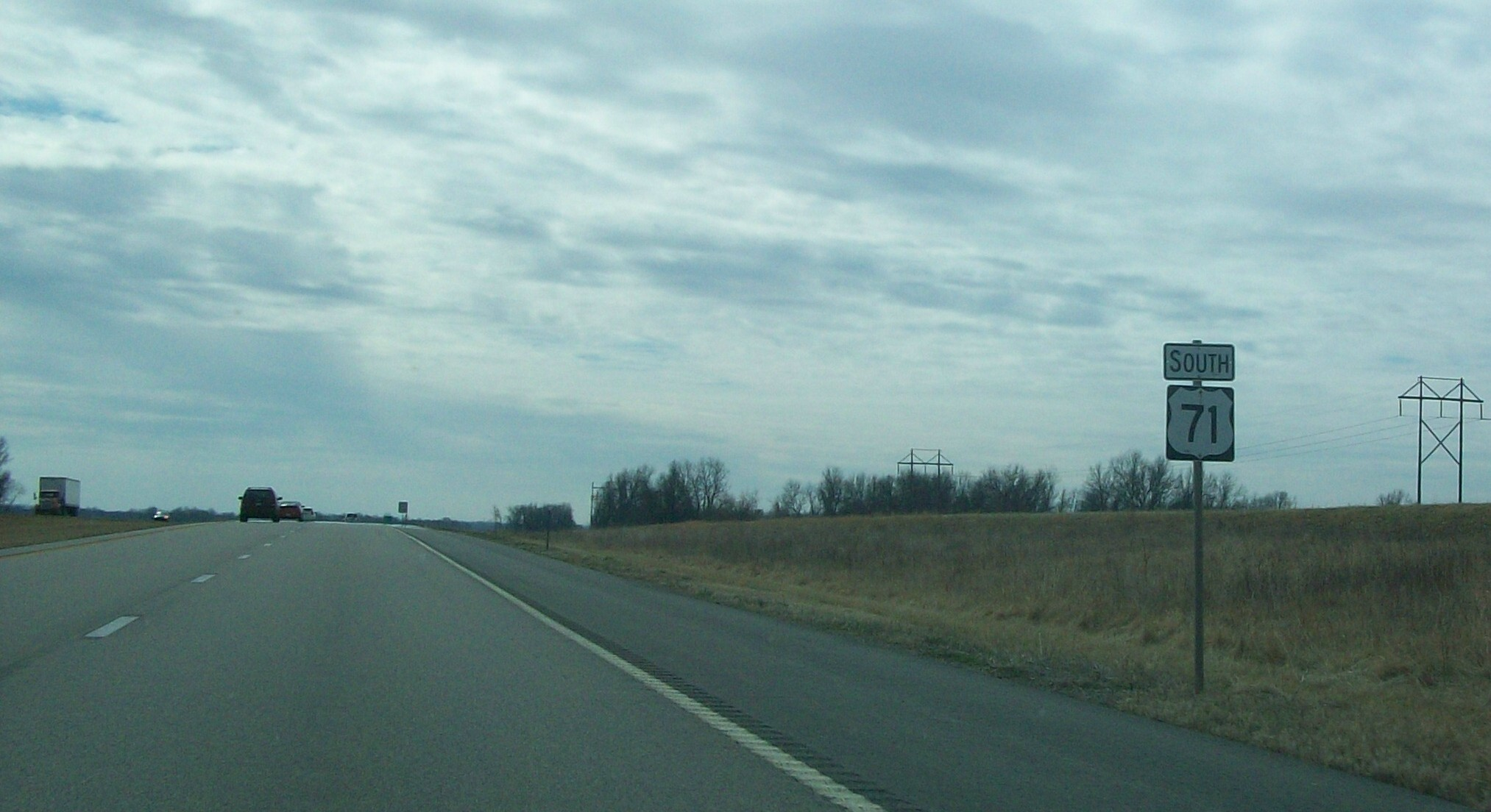
Route 71 in Missouri

In Missouri, US 71 is signed as part of the new section of Interstate 49 from Pineville to the southeast side of the Kansas City metro area. The I-49 designation went into effect in December 2012.

On August 15, 2007, the final section of US 71 south of Kansas City to be converted to a 4-lane divided expressway was opened in McDonald County, between the cities of Lanagan and Jane. In Kansas City, I-49/US 71 is one of the components of the Grandview Triangle interchange. There is a 2-mile (3.2 km) section near Swope Park that has three at-grade intersections. Ample right of way exists on the corridor to upgrade to a freeway, though there are no plans to do so in the near future. From downtown Kansas City, US 71 overlaps with Interstate 29 to north of Saint Joseph. From there, US 71 continues as an expressway to Maryville before angling towards Iowa just north of Clearmont. In 2002, US 71 was four laned from Interstate 29, northwest of St. Joseph to Maryville. From there, until it enters Iowa at Braddyville, it continues to be the only remaining rural two lane section of this highway north of Kansas City.

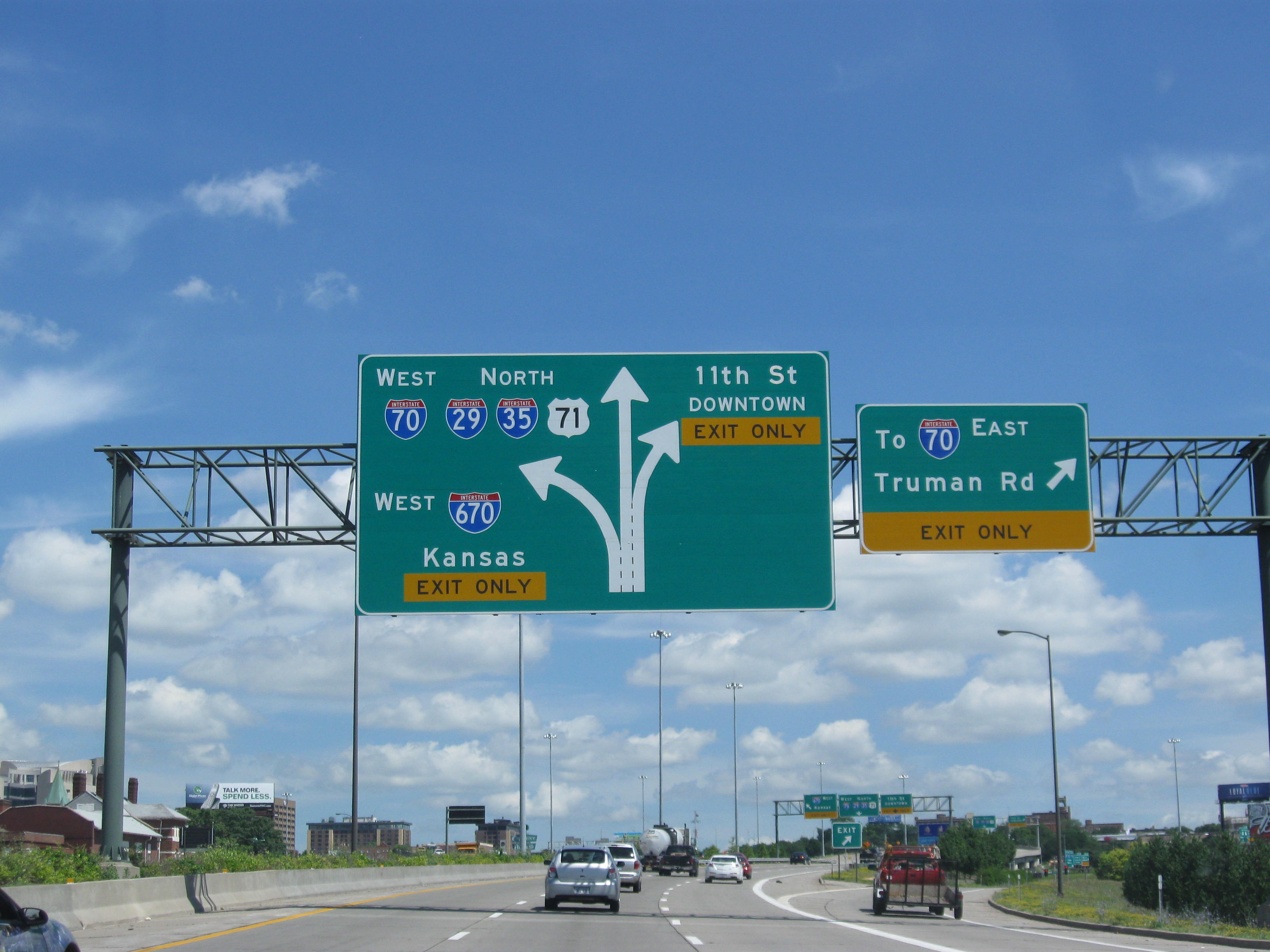
US 71 meets I-70 in Kansas City, Missouri. It will split into I-35 and I-29 approximately one mile farther north.

US 71 overlaps Interstate 70 on the east side of downtown Kansas City's freeway loop. US 71 then overlaps Interstate 35 and Interstate 29 for a segment which crosses the Missouri River via the Christopher S. Bond Bridge in Kansas City. It then continues concurrent with Interstate 29 after separating from Interstate 35 north of the Missouri River to just north of St. Joseph, Missouri where it diverges.

An alternative in the design of Interstate 29 called for it to follow US 71 on a more populated route through Maryville, Missouri and Clarinda, Iowa. However the interstate was to be routed along the more direct route to Omaha, Nebraska/Council Bluffs, Iowa and more sparsely populated Missouri River bottoms.

During the Great Flood of 1993, when the Missouri River flooded, I-29 traffic was detoured along US 71 through Maryville and Clarinda.

The four-lane segment between Savannah to Maryville was completed in 2002. It is a two-lane highway north of Maryville to the Iowa state line. The long delay in bringing a four-lane highway to Maryville even as most of the highway from Savannah south to the Arkansas line has been a four lanes for some time was a source of considerable irritation for Maryville and Northwest Missouri State University.

Outlaws Bonnie and Clyde engaged in a shootout with law enforcement officers in 1933 beside the highway at the Red Crown Tourist Court just southeast of Platte County, Missouri. The tourist court (which burned down) was just east of the main exit for I-29 Northbound at the old junction with US 71 Bypass now Missouri Route 291.

=== Iowa ===
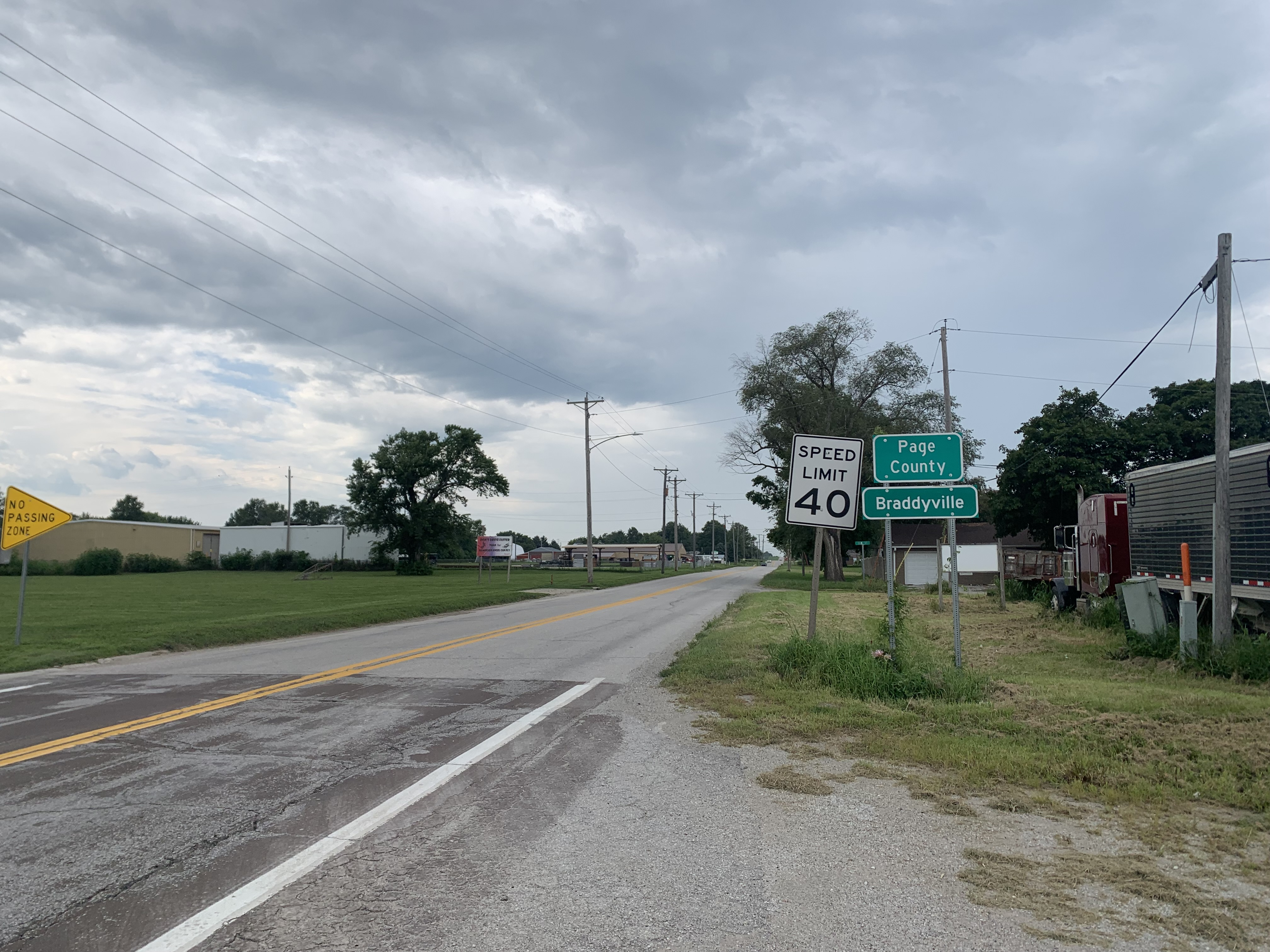
U.S. Route 71 at Iowa-Missouri border facing north into Braddyville, Iowa

US 71 passes through a rural section of western Iowa. It enters the state at Braddyville and junctions Interstate 80 near Brayton, northeast of Atlantic. North of I-80, US 71 passes through Carroll, where it intersects U.S. Route 30, and intersects and overlaps U.S. Route 20 at Sac City and U.S. Route 18 through Spencer. The highway crosses the Iowa Great Lakes where West Okoboji and East Okoboji Lake meet before exiting the state.

US 71 formerly entered Storm Lake concurrently with Iowa Highway 7 but was moved to a new alignment east of Storm Lake in 1996 to lessen travel time between Carroll and Spencer, the two largest communities on US 71 in Iowa. A business route of US 71 follows the highway's former alignment through Storm Lake.

A business route for US 71 also passes through Clarinda on a former alignment of US 71.

=== Minnesota ===
As is the case in Iowa, US 71 in Minnesota is largely a rural highway. It crosses Interstate 90 at Jackson, passes through Windom, and intersects U.S. Route 14 at Sanborn. It passes through Redwood Falls and Willmar before its junction with Interstate 94/U.S. Highway 52 at Sauk Centre. Around Willmar, US 71 is built to freeway standards. From there, US 71 passes through Long Prairie, Wadena, and Park Rapids before touching Itasca State Park, the source of the Mississippi River. It then crosses the Mississippi and is a major route for northern Minnesota as it goes around Bemidji (the "first city on the Mississippi") and angles northeast to its terminus at the Canada–US border in International Falls. The route between Bemidji and International Falls parallels the Blue Ox Trail, formerly the Northern Pacific Railway. On the Ontario side, Highway 71 links the bridge to Ontario Highway 71 in Fort Frances, which continues north and terminates at Ontario Highway 17 just east of Kenora.

The Minnesota section of US 71 is defined as Routes 4 and 141 in Minnesota Statutes §§ 161.114(2) and 161.115(72).,

== History ==
The original southern terminus of US 71 was in Baton Rouge, Louisiana at the Baton Rouge-Port Allen Mississippi River ferry. This was also the original western terminus of US 190, which continued east from the ferry landing through Baton Rouge, shortly intersecting US 61. US 71 was routed along the Jefferson Highway (pre-1955 State Route 1) from Baton Rouge north to Clarence (near Natchitoches). From Clarence to Shreveport, a more direct route was chosen than that followed by the Jefferson Highway, and US 71 continued north into Arkansas rather than west into Texas.

The current route of US 71 in Louisiana follows or closely parallels the 1926 alignment north of Lebeau. Between Port Allen and Lebeau, US 71 originally followed present-day LA 76 to Rosedale, LA 77 to Ravenswood, and LA 10 to Lebeau, crossing the Atchafalaya River by ferry at Melville. In 1935, US 190 was extended west onto a newly built section of State Route 7 (the Evangeline Highway) with a bridge across the Atchafalaya River at Krotz Springs. The following year, US 71 was moved onto this route, branching northward to Lebeau from its current southern terminus west of Krotz Springs and bypassing the ferry crossing at Melville. In 1940, US 71 and 190 were moved onto the new Mississippi River Bridge at Baton Rouge, bypassing the ferry crossing there. US 71 was cut back to its current southern terminus west of Krotz Springs in 1951.

In northwest Arkansas, the 1926 alignment of US 71 followed Highway 102 from Bentonville to Centerton, then north on Highway 102 Business to Highway 72 southeast of Hiwasse. From there, it followed Arkansas 72 to Gravette, where it turned north on Highway 59 to the Missouri state line. In the 1930s, US 71 was rerouted along Arkansas 72 between Bentonville and Gravette, then north on Arkansas 59. This alignment lasted until the early 1960s when it was realigned along Highway 100 between Bentonville and the Missouri state line. In Missouri, the new US 71 replaced Route 88, which had been defined in 1922, while the old US 71 became Route 59.

Highway 71 has a brief concurrency with Highway 237 before crossing over The Loop Interstate 49 instead of (future Interstate 130) in the southeast part of town.

== Future ==
A large section of US 71 from Shreveport, Louisiana to Kansas City, Missouri is slated to be upgraded to Interstate 49 (I-49) or bypassed by I-49. The largest gap is from Fort Smith, Arkansas to Texarkana.

== Major intersections ==
Louisiana
US 190 west of Krotz Springs
US 167 southeast of Lecompte. The highways travel concurrently to Alexandria.
I-49 / US 167 in Alexandria
US 165 in Alexandria. The highways travel concurrently to Pineville.
I-49 in Alexandria
US 167 in Tioga. The highways travel concurrently to southeast of Creola.
US 84 in Clarence. The highways travel concurrently to Coushatta.
US 371 in Coushatta. The highways travel concurrently to the Coushatta–Edgefield line.
I-20 in Bossier City. The highways travel concurrently to Shreveport.
US 79 / US 80 in Shreveport
I-220 in Shreveport
I-49 southeast of Hosston
Arkansas
I-49 south-southeast of Doddridge
I-49 south of Fouke
I-49 in Texarkana
US 67 / US 82 in Texarkana. The highways travel concurrently to the Texas state line at the Texarkana-Texarkana city line.
I-30 / US 59 on the Texas state line on the Texarkana–Texarkana, Texas city line. US 59/US 71 travels concurrently to Acorn.
Texas
Future I-369 north of Texarkana
I-49 north of Texarkana
Arkansas
US 371 in Lockesburg. The highways travel concurrently to De Queen.
US 70 / US 371 north-northwest of Lockesburg. The highways travel concurrently to De Queen.
Future I-49 east of De Queen
US 278 in Wickes
US 59 / US 270 in Acorn. US 71/US 270 travels concurrently to Y City.
Future I-49 west-southwest of Y City
Future I-49 in Mansfield
Future I-49 north of Huntington
Future I-49 southeast of Fort Smith
I-540 in Fort Smith. The highways travel concurrently to Van Buren.
US 64 in Van Buren
I-40 in Van Buren. The highways travel concurrently to Alma.
I-49 in Alma
I-49 in Fayetteville. The highways travel concurrently to Bentonville.
US 62 in Fayetteville. The highways travel concurrently to Bentonville.
US 412 in Springdale
Missouri
I-49 south of Pineville. The highways travel concurrently to Kansas City.
US 60 in Neosho
I-44 south-southwest of Duenweg. The highways travel concurrently to Fidelity.
US 160 in Lamar
US 54 in Nevada
I-49 / I-435 / I-470 / US 50 in Kansas City. I-470/US 50/US 71 travels concurrently, but on different lanes, through Kansas City.
US 56 in Kansas City
I-70 / I-670 / US 40 in Kansas City. I-70/US 40/US 71 travels concurrently through Kansas City.
I-29 / I-35 / I-70 / US 24 / US 40 in Kansas City. I-29/US 71 travels concurrently to east of Amazonia. I-35/US 71 travels concurrently through Kansas City.
US 69 on the Gladstone–Kansas City city line
US 169 on the Gladstone–Kansas City city line
I-635 in Kansas City
I-435 in Kansas City. The highways travel concurrently to Platte City.
I-229 south-southeast of St. Joseph
US 169 in St. Joseph
US 36 in St. Joseph
US 169 in St. Joseph
US 59 north-northeast of Country Club. The highways travel concurrently to northwest of Savannah.
US 136 in Maryville. The highways travel concurrently to east-southeast of Burlington Junction.
Iowa
US 34 north of Villisca
US 6 in Atlantic. The highways travel concurrently to north-northeast of Lorah.
I-80 / US 6 north-northeast of Lorah
US 30 in Carroll
US 20 northeast of Sac City and north of Early. The highways travel concurrently between these intersections.
US 18 in Spencer. The highways travel concurrently through Spencer.
Minnesota
I-90 in Jackson
US 14 north of Sanborn
US 212 in Olivia. The highways travel concurrently through Olivia.
US 12 in Willmar
I-94 / US 52 in Sauk Centre
US 10 in Wadena
US 2 in Bemidji. The highways travel concurrently through Bemidji.
US 53 in International Falls. The highways travel concurrently to the Canada–United States border at Fort Frances, Ontario.
Central Avenue/Church Street at the Canada–United States border at Fort Frances, Ontario

== Related routes ==
- U.S. Route 171
- U.S. Route 271
- U.S. Route 371
- Special routes of U.S. Route 71

== Notes ==
Browse numbered routes
← LA 70	LA	→ LA 72
← SH 70	TX	→ SH 71
← US 70	AR	→ AR 72
← I-70	MO	→ I-72
← Iowa 70	IA	→ I-74
← MN 70	MN	→ MN 72
