= S.S.P. Mills and Son Building =

- S. S. P. Mills and Son Building
- Formerly listed on the U.S. National Register of Historic Places
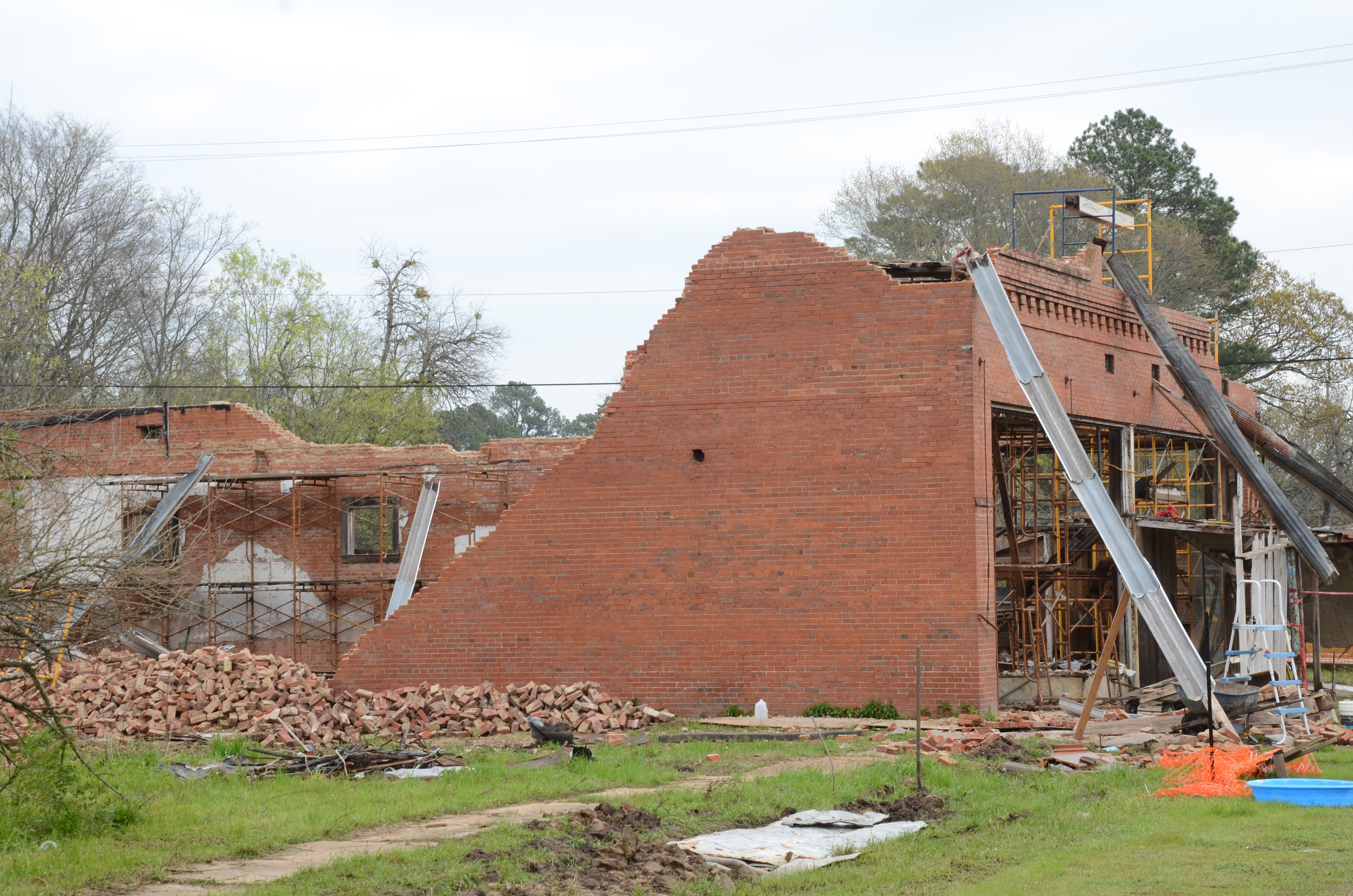
- The Mills and Son Building being demolished in March, 2016

- Location within Arkansas Location within the United States
- Location: Jct. of Texarkana Ave. and Main St., NW corner, Wilton, Arkansas
- Coordinates: 33°44′25″N 94°8′54″W
- Area: less than one acre
- Built: 1912
- Architect: Witt, Seibert & Company
- MPS: Railroad Era Resources of Southwest Arkansas MPS
- NRHP reference No.: 96000631

Significant dates
- Added to NRHP: June 20, 1996
- Removed from NRHP: January 24, 2017

The S.S.P. Mills and Son Building was a historic commercial building at the northwest corner of Texarkana Avenue and Main Street in Wilton, Arkansas, between the railroad tracks and United States Route 71. It was a single-story panel brick building, built by a local landowner and merchant for his commercial activities. It was designed by Witt, Seibert & Company of Texarkana, and built in 1912. It was one of the few commercial buildings in Wilton to survive from the growth period after the arrival of the railroad in the city.

The building was listed on the National Register of Historic Places in 1996. It was demolished in 2016, and removed from the Register in 2017.

== See also ==
- National Register of Historic Places listings in Little River County, Arkansas
