= Mullins Court =

- U.S. National Register of Historic Places
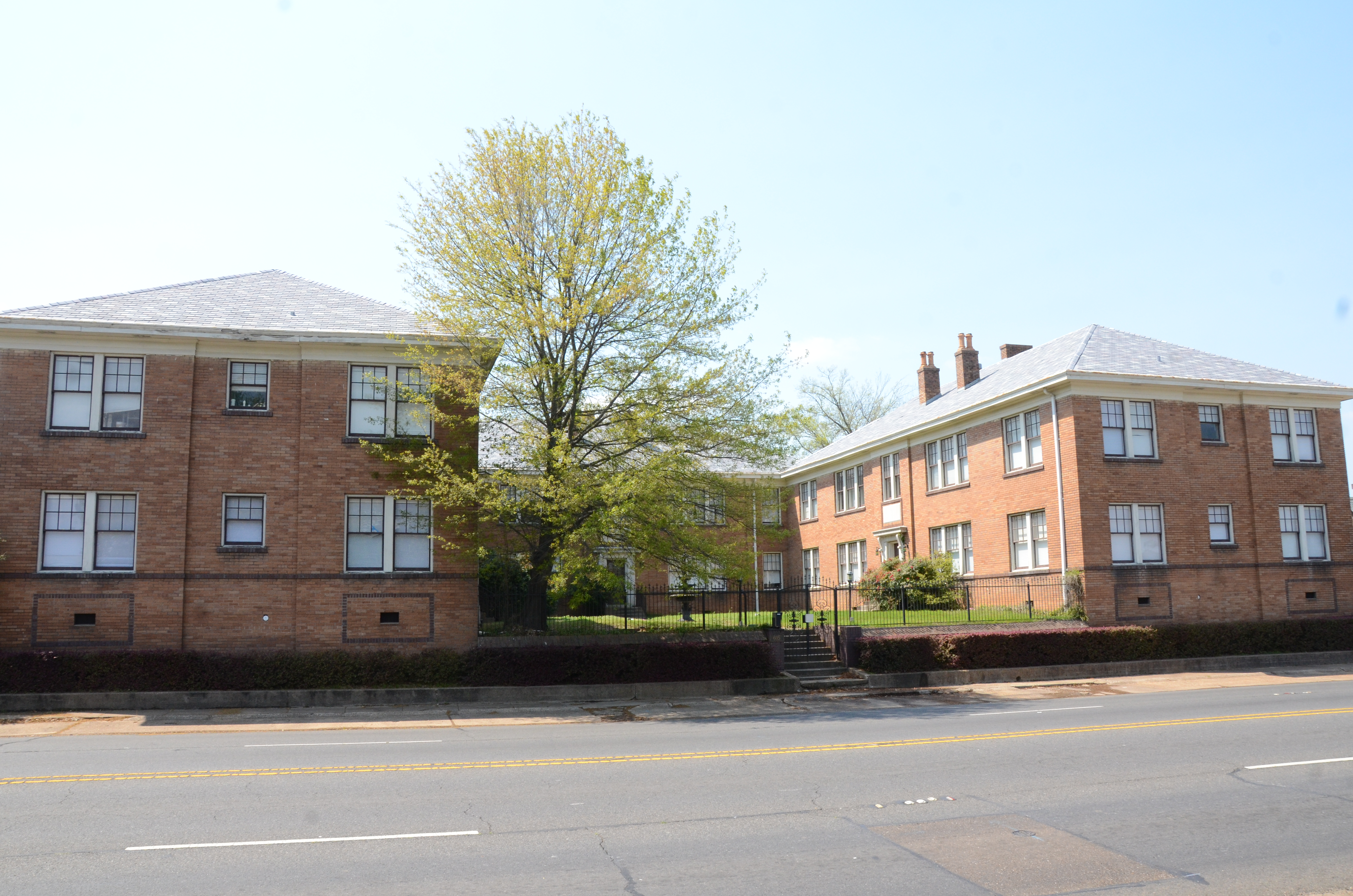

- Location within Arkansas Location within the United States
- Location: 605 Hickory St., Texarkana, Arkansas
- Coordinates: 33°25′53″N 94°2′8″W
- Area: less than one acre
- Built: 1928
- Architect: Witt, Seibert & Halsey
- Architectural style: Colonial Revival
- NRHP reference No.: 06001313
- Added to NRHP: January 29, 2007

Mullins Court is a historic apartment complex at 605 Hickory Street in Texarkana, Arkansas. It is a two-story U-shaped building built of brick and topped by a hip roof. The main entry is located in the courtyard formed by the U, and is framed in limestone trim. The brick is primarily orange, although there is a course of puce bricks that serve as an accent. The building was designed by Witt, Seibert & Halsey, and was built in 1928. It was the first apartment block in the city built in the Colonial Revival style, and was named in honor of the locally prominent Mullins family.

The building was listed on the National Register of Historic Places in 2007.

== See also ==
- National Register of Historic Places listings in Miller County, Arkansas
