= Buhrman–Pharr Hardware Company Historic District =

Historic district in Arkansas, United States

- U.S. National Register of Historic Places
- U.S. Historic district
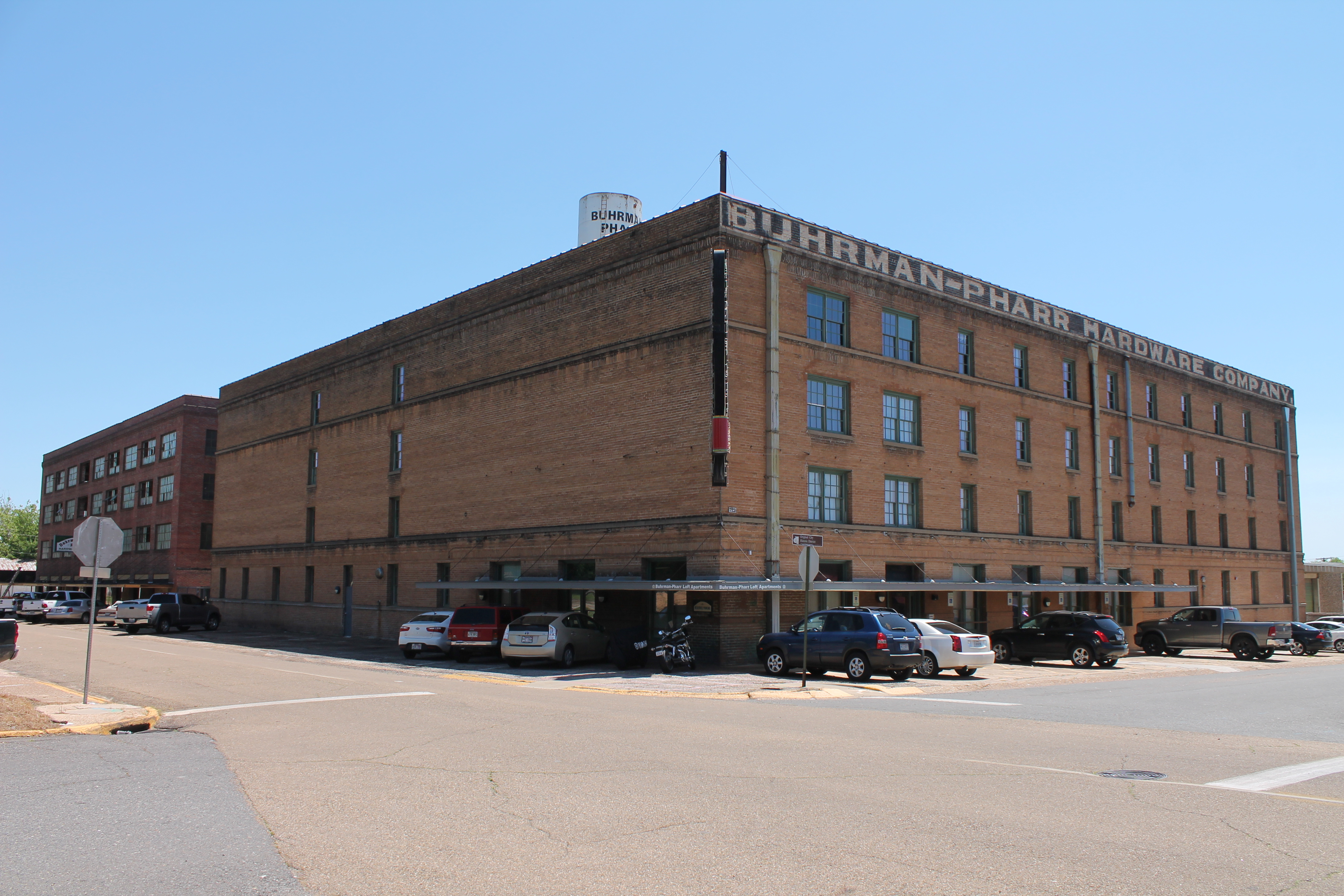

- Location within Arkansas Location within the United States
- Location: 610 and 620 E 3rd St., Texarkana, Arkansas
- Coordinates: 33°25′36″N 94°2′15″W
- Area: 1 acre (0.40 ha)
- Built: 1914
- Architect: Witt, Seibert & Halsey
- Architectural style: Early Commercial
- NRHP reference No.: 04001045
- Added to NRHP: September 24, 2004

The Buhrman–Pharr Hardware Company Historic District encompasses a pair of brick commercial buildings on 3rd Street in Texarkana, Arkansas. The two four-story structures, located on the block between Laurel and Ash Streets, were built in 1914 and 1923 for the Buhrmann–Pharr Hardware Company, a significant force in the economic development of Texarkana for more than a century. The company was founded in the late 1880s by W. J. Buhrman and J. L. Chatfield, the interest of the latter being taken over by F. E. Pharr in 1908. Started as a modest retail establishment, the company grew to become one of the region's largest wholesale supplier of hardware and agricultural implements. These two buildings were built to address the company's growth in the first decades of the 20th century. The wholesale business was closed in 2001 and the retail establishment shut down two years later.

The district was listed on the National Register of Historic Places in 2004.

== See also ==
- National Register of Historic Places listings in Miller County, Arkansas
