= Smackover Historic Commercial District =

Historic district in Arkansas, United States

- U.S. National Register of Historic Places
- U.S. Historic district
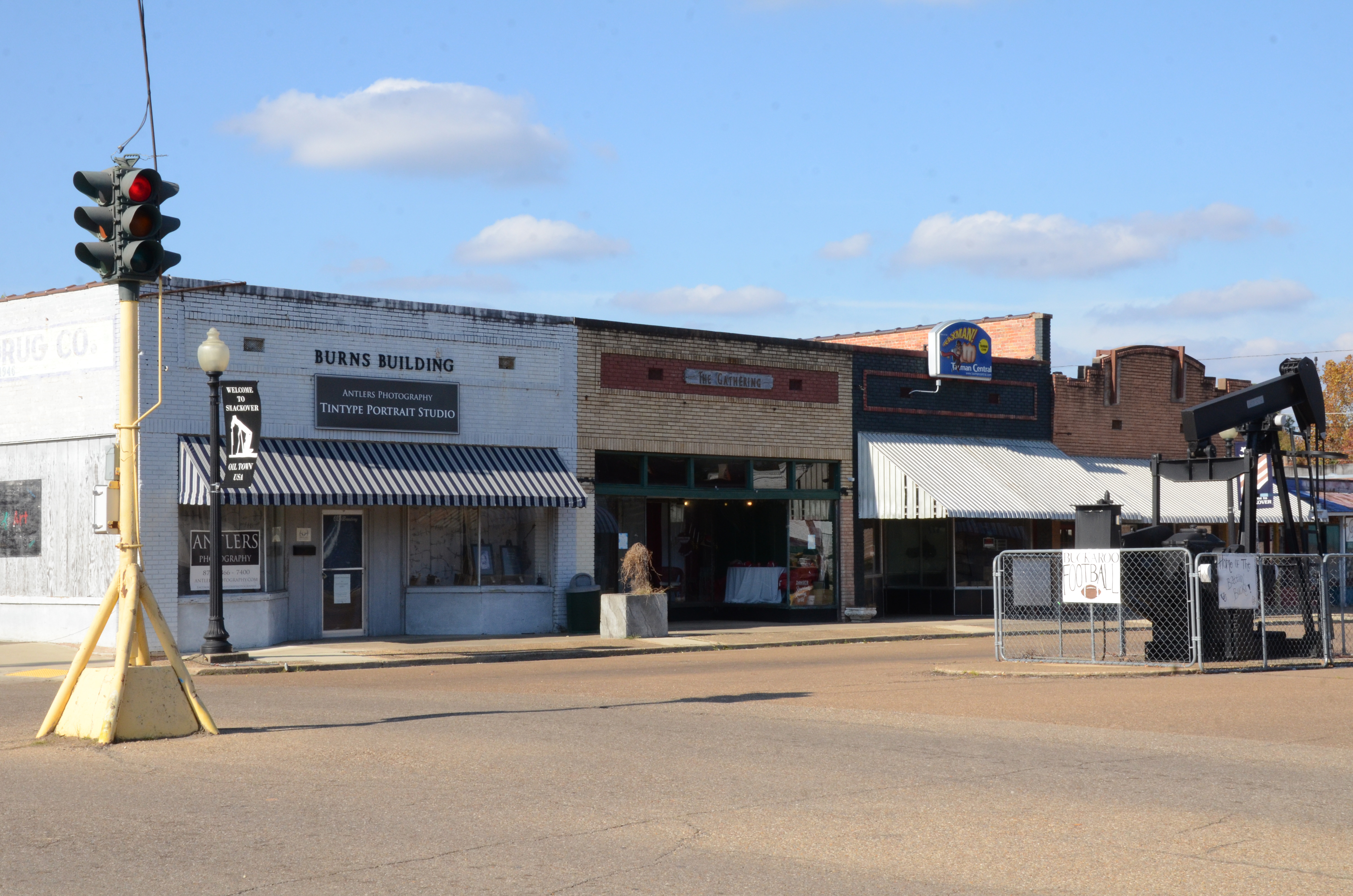

- Location within Arkansas Location within the United States
- Location: 601-628 Broadway, Smackover, Arkansas
- Coordinates: 33.36535°N 92.72481°W
- Area: 4 acres (1.6 ha)
- Built: 1925
- Architect: Witt, Seibert & Halsey
- Architectural style: Vernacular commercial
- NRHP reference No.: 90000884
- Added to NRHP: June 14, 1990

The Smackover Historic Commercial District encompasses the civic and commercial heart of the small town of Smackover, Arkansas. It consists of sixteen buildings lining a single block of Broadway north of 7th Avenue. The area is reflective of Smackover's explosive growth following the discovery of oil in 1925; most of the buildings were built between 1925 and 1940. They are mostly vernacular commercial buildings, one or two stories in height, with flat roofs obscured by a parapet on the main facade. Also included in the district are the Methodist Episcopal church, the old fire station, and the old city hall and jail. The district was listed on the National Register of Historic Places in 1990.

== See also ==
- National Register of Historic Places listings in Union County, Arkansas
