= First Methodist Church (Lewisville, Arkansas) =

Historic church in Arkansas, United States

- U.S. National Register of Historic Places
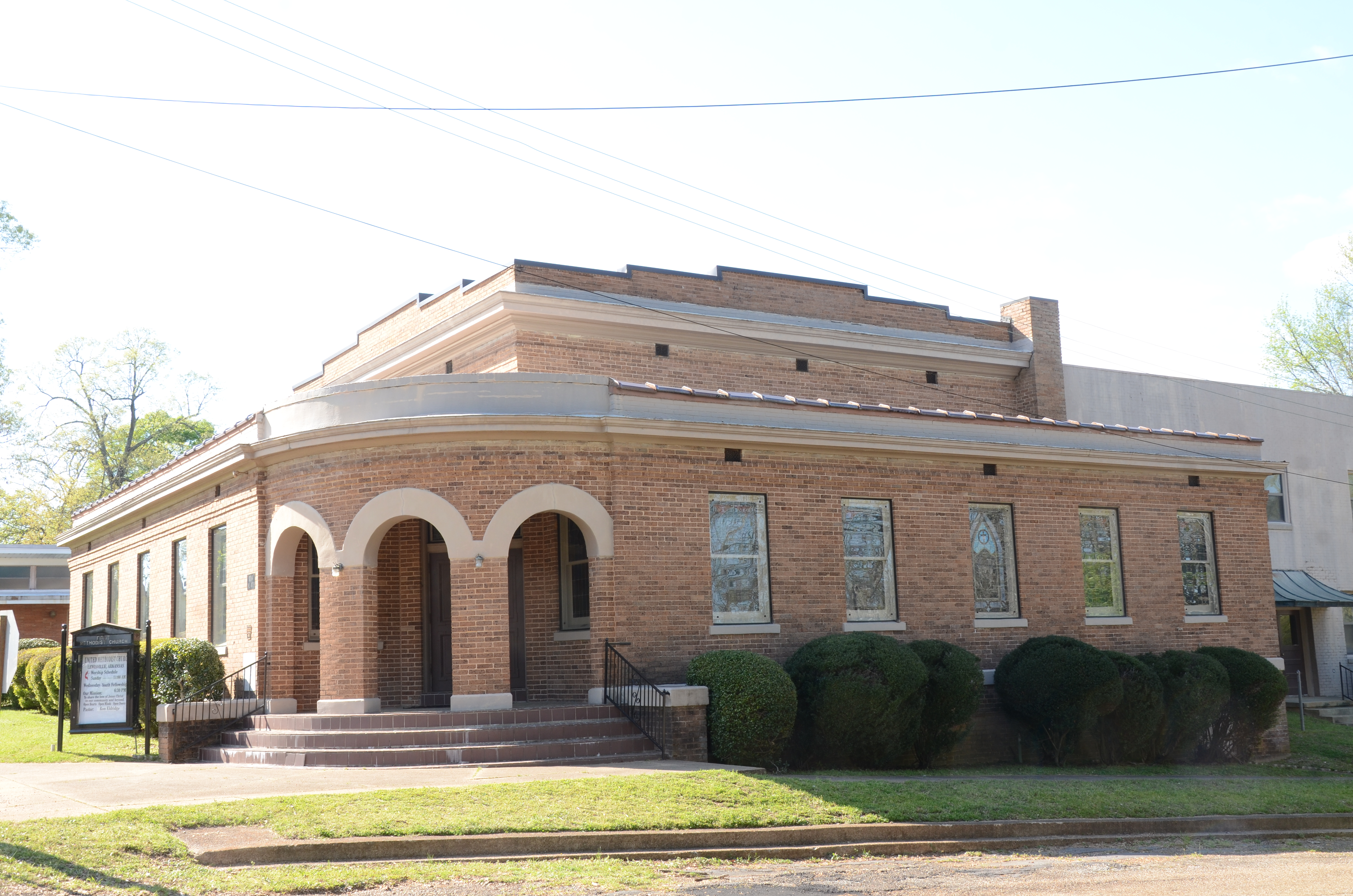

- Location within Arkansas Location within the United States
- Location: Jct. of Chestnut and 4th Sts., NW corner, Lewisville, Arkansas
- Coordinates: 33°21′30″N 93°34′44″W
- Area: less than one acre
- Built: 1913
- Architect: Witt, Seibert & Company
- Architectural style: Classical Revival
- MPS: Railroad Era Resources of Southwest Arkansas MPS
- NRHP reference No.: 96000639
- Added to NRHP: June 20, 1996

The First Methodist Church is a historic church at the junction of Chestnut and 4th Streets, NW corner in Lewisville, Arkansas. The single-story brick building was designed by Witt, Seibert & Company of Texarkana and built in 1913. It is distinctive as one of the only church buildings to survive from Lewisville's period of economic prosperity during the lumber boom, and as an Akron Plan design with Classical Revival features.

The building was listed on the National Register of Historic Places in 1996.

== See also ==
- National Register of Historic Places listings in Lafayette County, Arkansas
