= Pike County Courthouse (Arkansas) =

- U.S. National Register of Historic Places
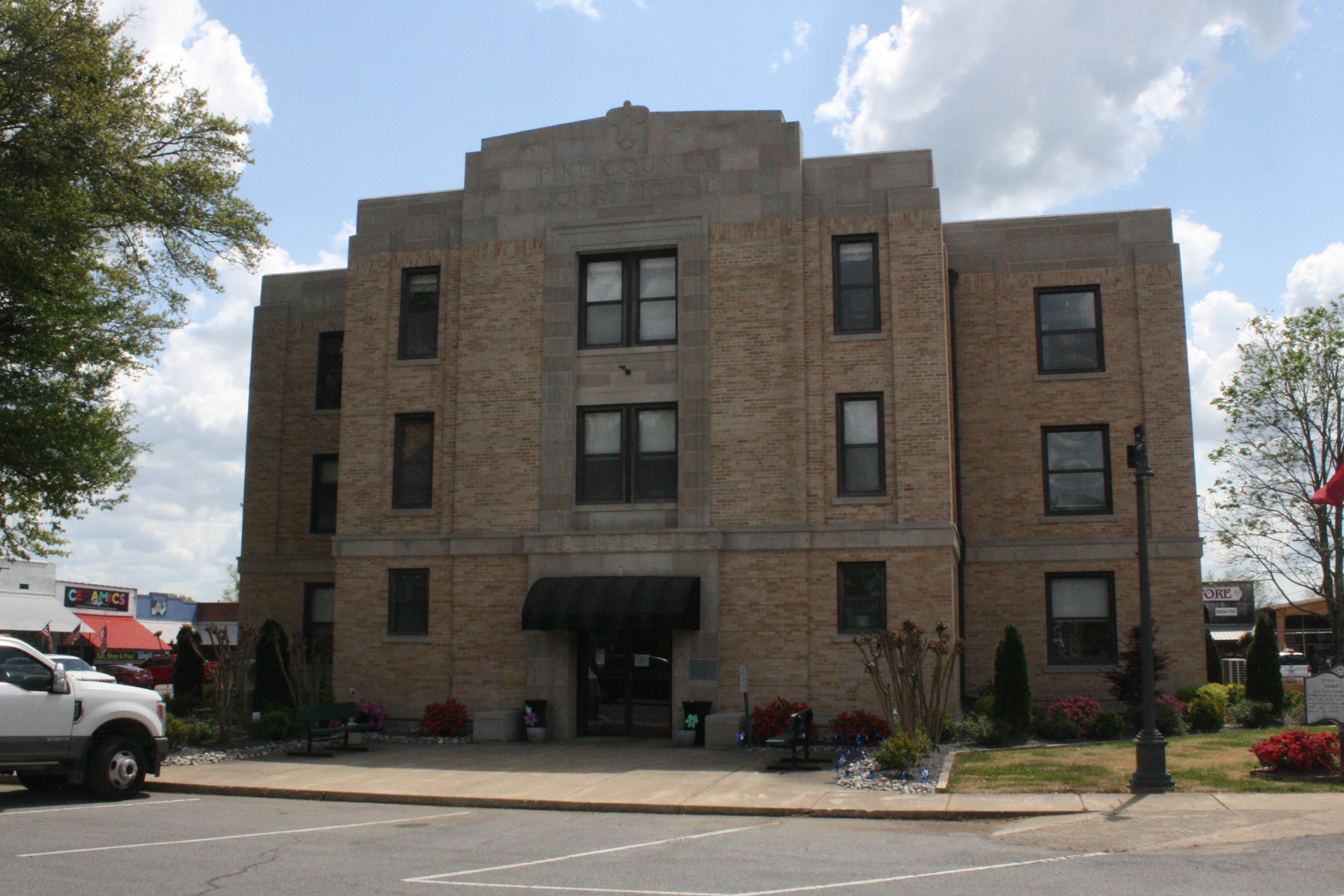

- Location within Arkansas Location within the United States
- Location: Courthouse Sq., Murfreesboro, Arkansas
- Coordinates: 34°3′43″N 93°41′23″W
- Built: 1932
- Architect: Witt, Seibert & Halsey
- Architectural style: Art Deco
- NRHP reference No.: 86002863
- Added to NRHP: October 16, 1986

The Pike County Courthouse is located at Courthouse Square in the center of Murfreesboro, Arkansas, United States. The two-story Art Deco structure was designed by the Texarkana firm of Witt, Seibert & Halsey, and built in 1931–32. It is the county's fourth courthouse, all of which were built at or near the location of this one. A near duplicate of the Sevier County Courthouse in DeQueen, it is the only major Art Deco structure in the county.

The building was listed on the National Register of Historic Places in 1986.

== See also ==
- National Register of Historic Places listings in Pike County, Arkansas
