= W. C. Brown House =

Historic house in Arkansas, United States

- U.S. National Register of Historic Places
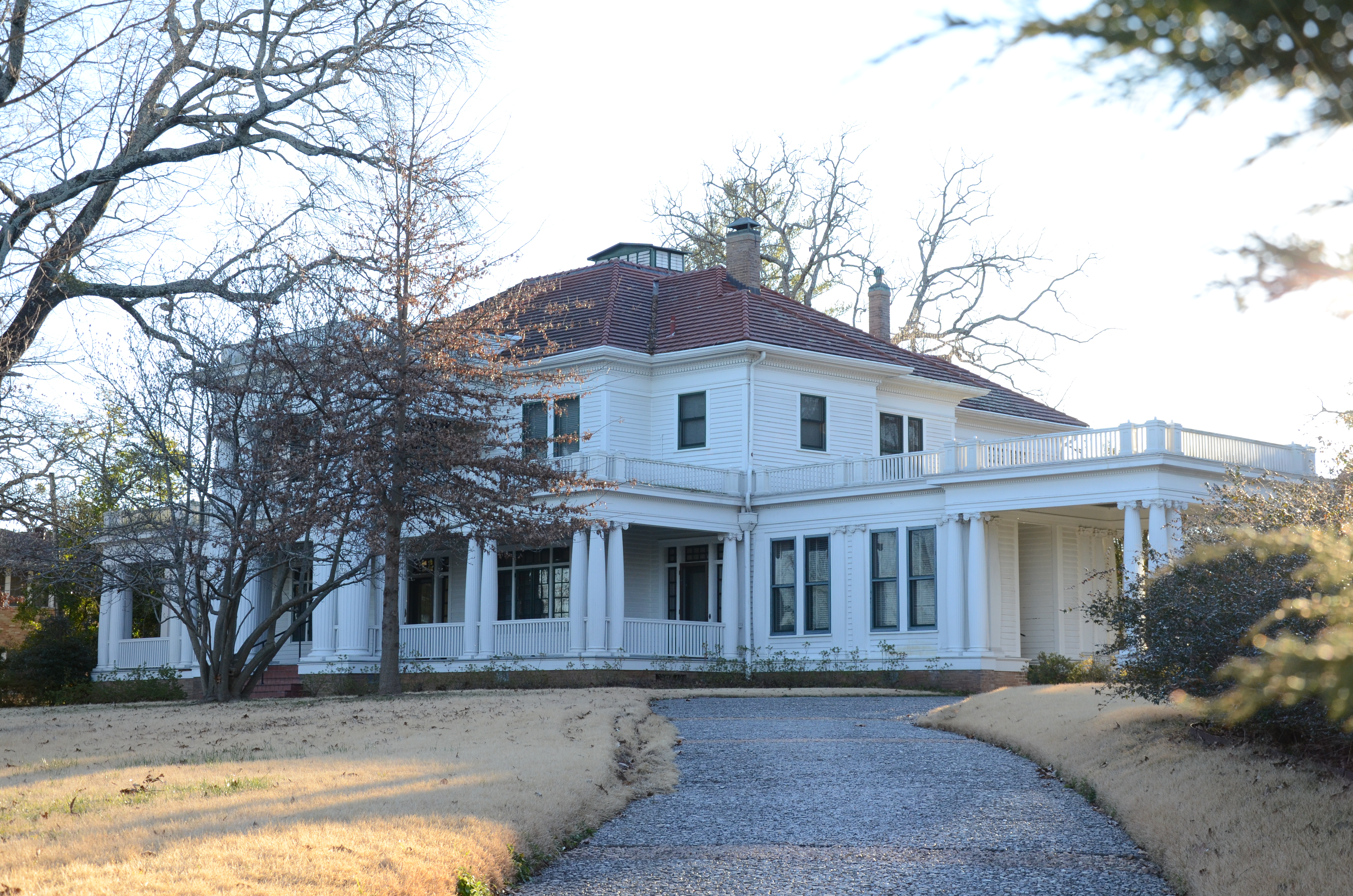

- Location within Arkansas Location within the United States
- Location: 2330 Central Avenue, Hot Springs, Arkansas
- Coordinates: 34°29′21″N 93°3′33″W
- Area: 4.5 acres (1.8 ha)
- Built: 1919
- Architect: Witt, Seibert & Halsey
- Architectural style: Classical Revival
- NRHP reference No.: 86002862
- Added to NRHP: October 16, 1986

The W. C. Brown House is a historic house located at 2330 Central Avenue in Hot Springs, Arkansas. It is a large 21-room mansion, with a prominent location on one of the city's major thoroughfares.

== Description and history ==
Originally built about 1890 with Queen Anne styling, it was extensively altered and expanded in 1919 to designs by Witt, Seibert & Halsey, and is one of the city's finest Classical Revival buildings. W. C. Brown was one of the principal owners of the Bodcaw Lumber Company, based in Stamps. He moved his family here due to frequent occurrences of malaria in the Stamps area.

The house was listed on the National Register of Historic Places on October 16, 1986.

== See also ==
- National Register of Historic Places listings in Garland County, Arkansas
