= Peoples Bank and Loan Building =

- U.S. National Register of Historic Places
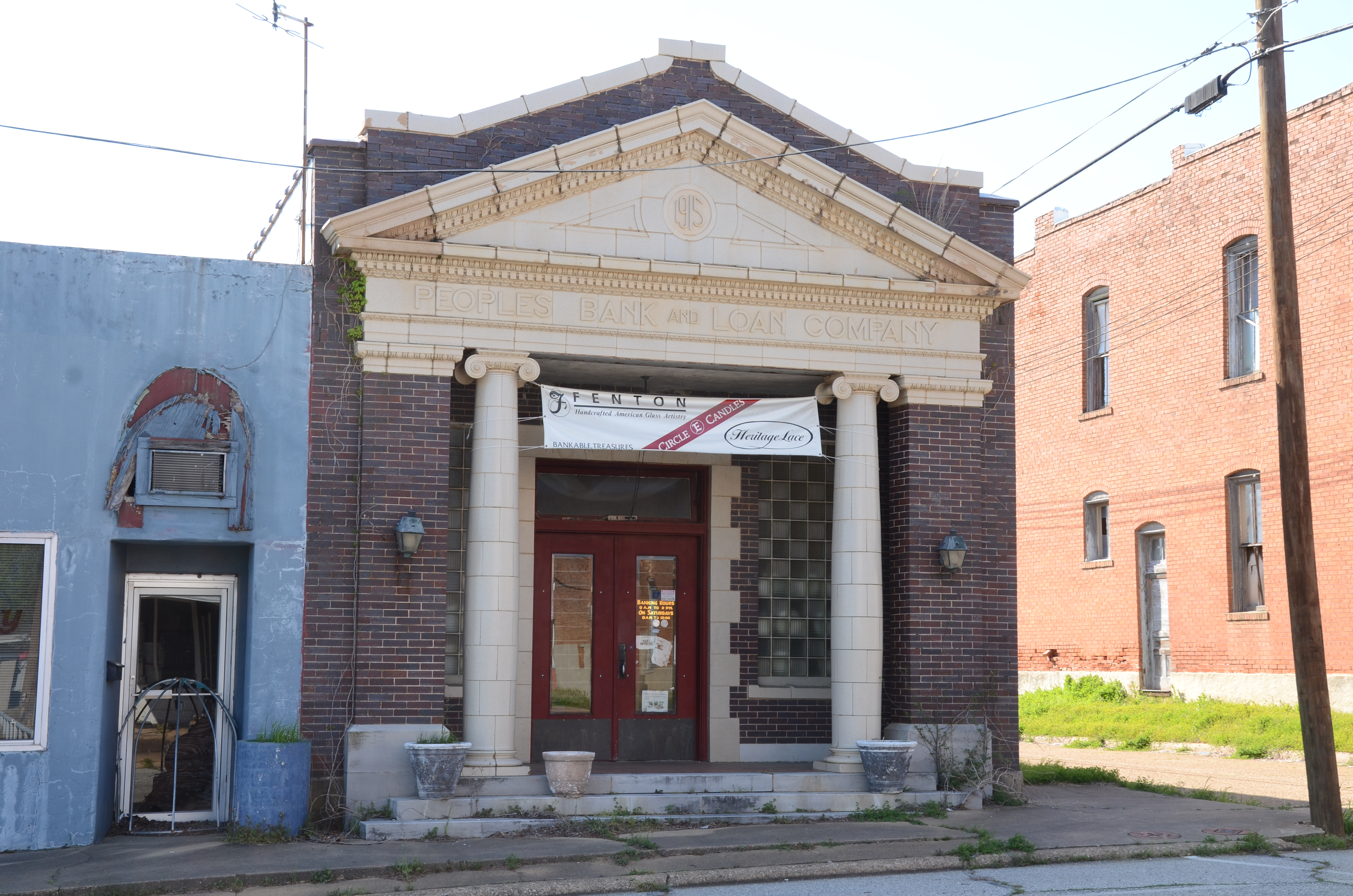

- Location within Arkansas Location within the United States
- Location: Jct. of Spruce and 3rd Sts., SW corner, Lewisville, Arkansas
- Coordinates: 33°21′24″N 93°34′39″W
- Area: less than one acre
- Built: 1915
- Architect: Witt, Seibert & Company
- Architectural style: Classical Revival
- MPS: Railroad Era Resources of Southwest Arkansas MPS
- NRHP reference No.: 96000637
- Added to NRHP: June 20, 1996

The Peoples Bank and Loan Building is a historic commercial building at the southwest corner of Spruce and 3rd Streets in Lewisville, Arkansas. The single-story masonry building was designed by the Texarkana firm of Witt, Seibert & Company and built in 1915, during Lafayette County's timber boom years. It is one of the few commercial buildings in the county to survive from that period, and is a fine local example of Classical Revival architecture.

The building was listed on the National Register of Historic Places in 1996.

== See also ==
- National Register of Historic Places listings in Lafayette County, Arkansas
