= Witt, Seibert & Halsey =

American architectural firm

Practice information
- Partners: Sidney Stewart; Bayard Witt; Eugene C. Seibert; Fred H. Halsey; Robert Reinheimer Jr.
- Founders: Sidney Stewart
- Location: Texarkana, Arkansas and Texas

Significant works and honors
- Buildings: Texarkana Municipal Building; U. S. Post Office and Courthouse

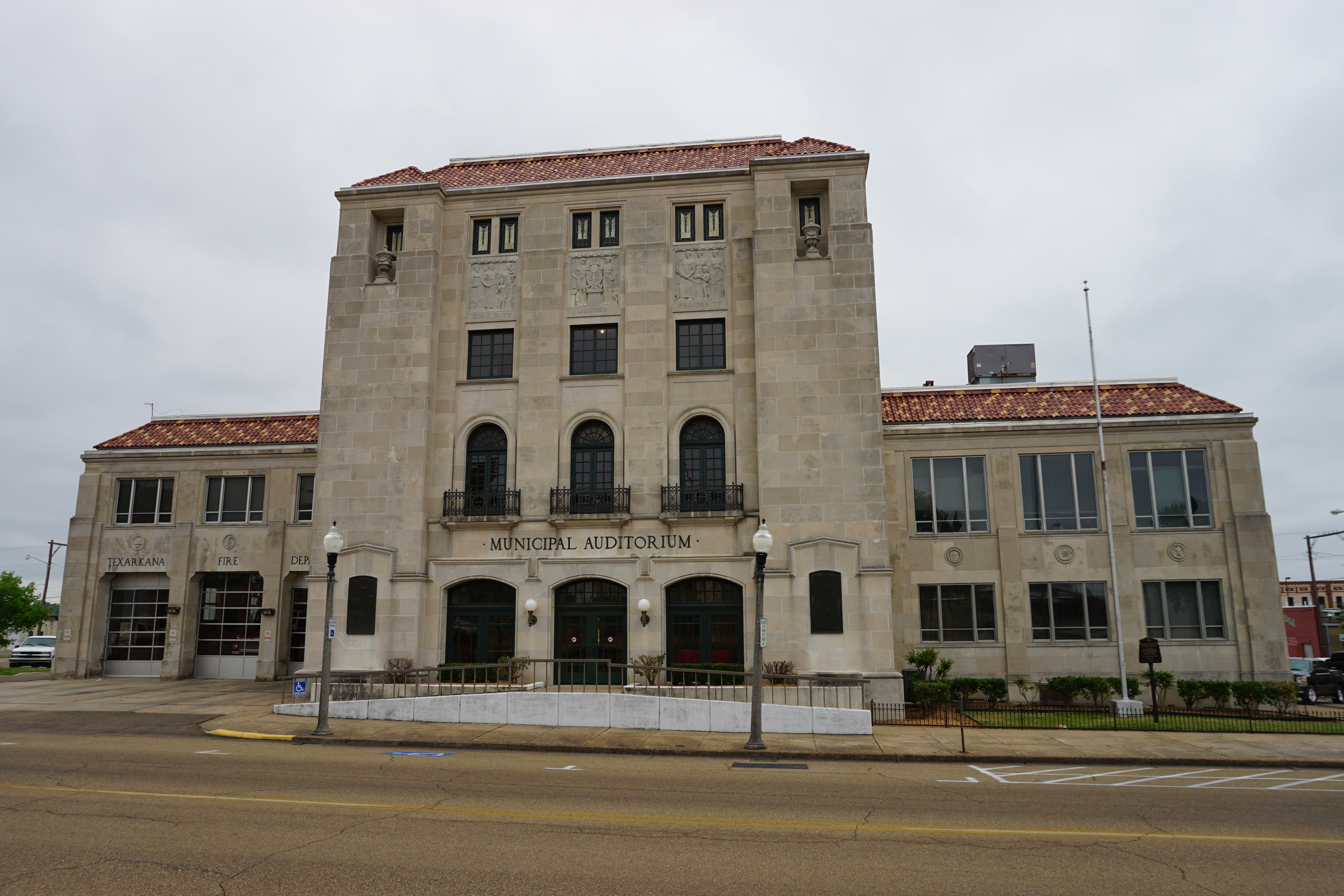
Municipal Building, Texarkana, Arkansas. 1927.

Witt, Seibert & Halsey was an American architectural firm based in the twin cities of Texarkana, Arkansas and Texarkana, Texas, with a practice extending into Arkansas, Louisiana and Texas. It was founded by architect Sidney Stewart, but achieved prominence under Bayard Witt and Eugene C. Seibert.

== History ==
Bayard Witt was born in 1880 in Witt's Foundry, Tennessee. He worked as a railroad laborer and foreman before obtaining an apprenticeship in civil engineering. In 1904 he moved to Texarkana, Arkansas, joining the office of architect Sidney Stewart, who had been practicing in Texarkana since at least 1900. By 1907, Witt was a partner in the firm of Stewart & Witt.

Eugene Charles Seibert was born in 1878 in Berea, Ohio. He attended the Case School of Applied Science and Columbia University before entering the office of prominent Fort Worth architects Sanguinet & Staats. In 1908, he moved to Texarkana, joining Stewart & Witt. In 1909, Sidney Stewart chose to return to his native Canada. The firm was then established in 1909 as Witt & Seibert. Fred H. Halsey was added as partner in 1911, the firm becoming Witt, Seibert & Company. Halsey had attended Washington University in St. Louis, and had also worked in Fort Worth. Halsey's name was added to the firm's in 1919.

The partnership was dissolved in 1937, when Seibert left to form his own practice. Witt & Halsey continued briefly, separating in 1940. Witt continued alone until 1944, when he took Robert Reinheimer Jr. as partner in Witt & Reinheimer, which was dissolved upon Witt's death in 1947.

Seibert maintained his independent practice until his death in 1941. He was also mayor of Texarkana, Arkansas from 1934 to 1939. Halsey entered government service after dissolving his partnership with Witt, but later returned to architectural practice. He died in 1978.

== Legacy ==
After Bayard Witt's passing, Reinheimer continued the practice as Reinheimer & Cox and Reinheimer, Cox & Associates into the 1970s.

The firm is responsible for a number of properties which have been placed on the National Register of Historic Places for their architectural significance.

== Architectural works ==
Year	Building	Address	City	State	Firm	Notes	Image	Reference
1904	Texarkana Industrial College	29th St and Garland Ave	Texarkana	Arkansas	Sidney Stewart	Later the Texarkana Baptist Orphanage. Demolished.		
1905	First Presbyterian Church	516 Pecan St	Texarkana	Arkansas	Sidney Stewart			
1907	Little River County Courthouse	351 N 2nd St	Ashdown	Arkansas	Sidney Stewart	Listed on the NRHP in 1976.		
1908	C. A. Johnston House	2015 Beech St	Texarkana	Arkansas	Stewart & Witt	A contributing property to the Beech Street Historic District, listed on the NRHP in 2010.		
1910	George W. Bottoms House	500 Hickory St	Texarkana	Arkansas	Witt & Seibert in association with C. D. Hill & Company of Dallas	Listed on the NRHP in 1982.		
1910	Dr. Henry A. Longino House	317 W Main St	Magnolia	Arkansas	Witt & Seibert	Listed on the NRHP in 1982.		
1911	Arkansas High School	Hickory and E 10th Sts	Texarkana	Arkansas	Witt, Seibert & Company	Demolished.		
1911	Thomas M. Dean House	1520 Beach St	Texarkana	Arkansas	Witt & Seibert	Listed on the NRHP in 1976.		
1912	First National Bank Building	100 Main St	Mount Vernon	Texas	Witt, Seibert & Company	Altered. Presently the Franklin County Library.		
1912	S. S. P. Mills & Son Building	Texarkana Ave and Main St	Wilton	Arkansas	Witt, Seibert & Company	Listed on the NRHP in 1996, but was removed in 2017 after being demolished in 2016.		
1912	Texarkana National Bank Building	100 E Broad St	Texarkana	Texas	Witt, Seibert & Company	Home to the firm's offices. Now altered.		
1913	Arnold and Greeson Stores	102-104 W Main St	Prescott	Arkansas	Witt, Seibert & Company	A contributing property to the Prescott Commercial Historic District, listed on the NRHP in 2008.		
1913	Dining Hall and Caraway and McCrary Halls	Third District Agricultural School	Magnolia	Arkansas	Witt, Seibert & Company	Demolished.		
1913	First M. E. Church	Chestnut and 4th Sts	Lewisville	Arkansas	Witt, Seibert & Company	Listed on the NRHP in 1996.		
1913	Masonic Temple	314 Main St	Texarkana	Texas	Witt, Seibert & Company			
1915	Dr. G. W. Chisholm House	930 E 5th St St	Texarkana	Arkansas	Witt, Seibert & Company	Demolished.		
1915	Peoples Bank and Loan Company Building	Spruce and 3rd Sts	Lewisville	Arkansas	Witt, Seibert & Company	Listed on the NRHP in 1996.		
1916	Eugene C. Seibert House	1701 Beech St	Texarkana	Arkansas	Witt, Seibert & Company	A contributing property to the Beech Street Historic District, listed on the NRHP in 2010.		
1916	National Building	100 E 2nd St	Hope	Arkansas	Witt, Seibert & Company	A contributing property to the Hope Historic Commercial District, listed on the NRHP in 1995.		
1917	Emmet M. E. Church	207 S Walnut St	Emmet	Arkansas	Witt, Seibert & Company			
1917	Leonidas Foster House	420 N Spruce St	Hope	Arkansas	Witt, Seibert & Company	Listed on the NRHP in 1991.		
1919	William C. Brown House	2330 Central Ave	Hot Springs	Arkansas	Witt, Seibert & Halsey	Listed on the NRHP in 1986.		
1923	Buhrman-Pharr Hardware Company Building	620 E 3rd St	Texarkana	Arkansas	Witt, Seibert & Halsey	A contributing property to the Buhrman–Pharr Hardware Company Historic District, listed on the NRHP in 2004.		
1923	Planters Bank and Trust Company Building	103 N Main St	Nashville	Arkansas	Witt, Seibert & Halsey			
1923	Sidney A. Umsted House	404 Washington St	Camden	Arkansas	Witt, Seibert & Halsey	Listed on the NRHP in 1995.		
1923	Texarkana National Bank Annex	100 E Broad St	Texarkana	Texas	Witt, Seibert & Halsey in association with Sanguinet, Staats & Hedrick of Fort Worth	Home to the firm's offices. Now altered.		
1924	Caddo Valley Academy	9th and Main Sts	Norman	Arkansas	Witt, Seibert & Halsey	Listed on the NRHP in 2002.		
1924	Texarkana City Hall	220 Texas Blvd	Texarkana	Texas	Witt, Seibert & Halsey in association with C. H. Page & Brother of Austin			
1925	First M. E. Church	700 S Broadway St	Smackover	Arkansas	Witt, Seibert & Halsey	A contributing property to the Smackover Historic Commercial District, listed on the NRHP in 1990. Presently the Smackover Library.		
1925	St. John Episcopal Church	117 Harrison St	Camden	Arkansas	Witt, Seibert & Halsey	Listed on the NRHP in 2017.		
1926	Saenger Theatre	211 W 2nd St	Hope	Arkansas	Witt, Seibert & Halsey	Demolished.		
1927	Texarkana Junior College	W 16th and Pine Sts	Texarkana	Texas	Witt, Seibert & Halsey	Listed on the NRHP in 2014 as part of the Texarkana Junior College and Texas High School. Demolished 2023		
1927	Texarkana Municipal Building	216 Walnut St	Texarkana	Arkansas	Witt, Seibert & Halsey	Listed on the NRHP in 2004.		
1928	Collins Home	1915 Olive St	Texarkana	Texas	Witt, Seibert & Halsey			
1928	Mullins Court	605 Hickory St	Texarkana	Arkansas	Witt, Seibert & Halsey	Listed on the NRHP in 2007.		
1928	Texarkana Country Club	1 Country Club Ln	Texarkana	Arkansas	Witt, Seibert & Halsey			
1929	Sevier County Courthouse	115 N 3rd St	De Queen	Arkansas	Witt, Seibert & Halsey			
1929	Texas High School	1915 Pine St	Texarkana	Texas	Witt, Seibert & Halsey	Listed on the NRHP in 2014 as part of the Texarkana Junior College and Texas High School Demolished 2023.		
1930	Jamison Building	513-515 W 3rd St	Texarkana	Texas	Witt, Seibert & Halsey			
1931	Central Christian Church	903 Walnut St	Texarkana	Texas	Witt, Seibert & Halsey			
1931	Pike County Courthouse	1 Courthouse Sq	Murfreesboro	Arkansas	Witt, Seibert & Halsey	Listed on the NRHP in 1986.		
1932	U. S. Post Office and Courthouse	500 N State Line Ave	Texarkana	Arkansas and Texas	Witt, Seibert & Halsey in association with Perkins, Chatten & Hammond of Chicago	Listed on the NRHP in 2000.		
1933	Trinity M. E. Church	300 N Vienna St	Ruston	Louisiana	Witt, Seibert & Halsey	Demolished.		
1938	Cass County Office Building	119 N Kauffman St	Linden	Texas	Witt & Halsey			
1939	Miller County Courthouse	400 Laurel St	Texarkana	Arkansas	Eugene C. Seibert	Listed on the NRHP in 1998.		
1940	Stevens Courts	2220 W 15th St	Texarkana	Texas	Witt & Halsey in association with James N. McCammon of Dallas	All demolished except for administration building.		
