= United States Post Office and Courthouse (Texarkana) =

- Texarkana US Post Office and Courthouse
- U.S. National Register of Historic Places
- Recorded Texas Historic Landmark
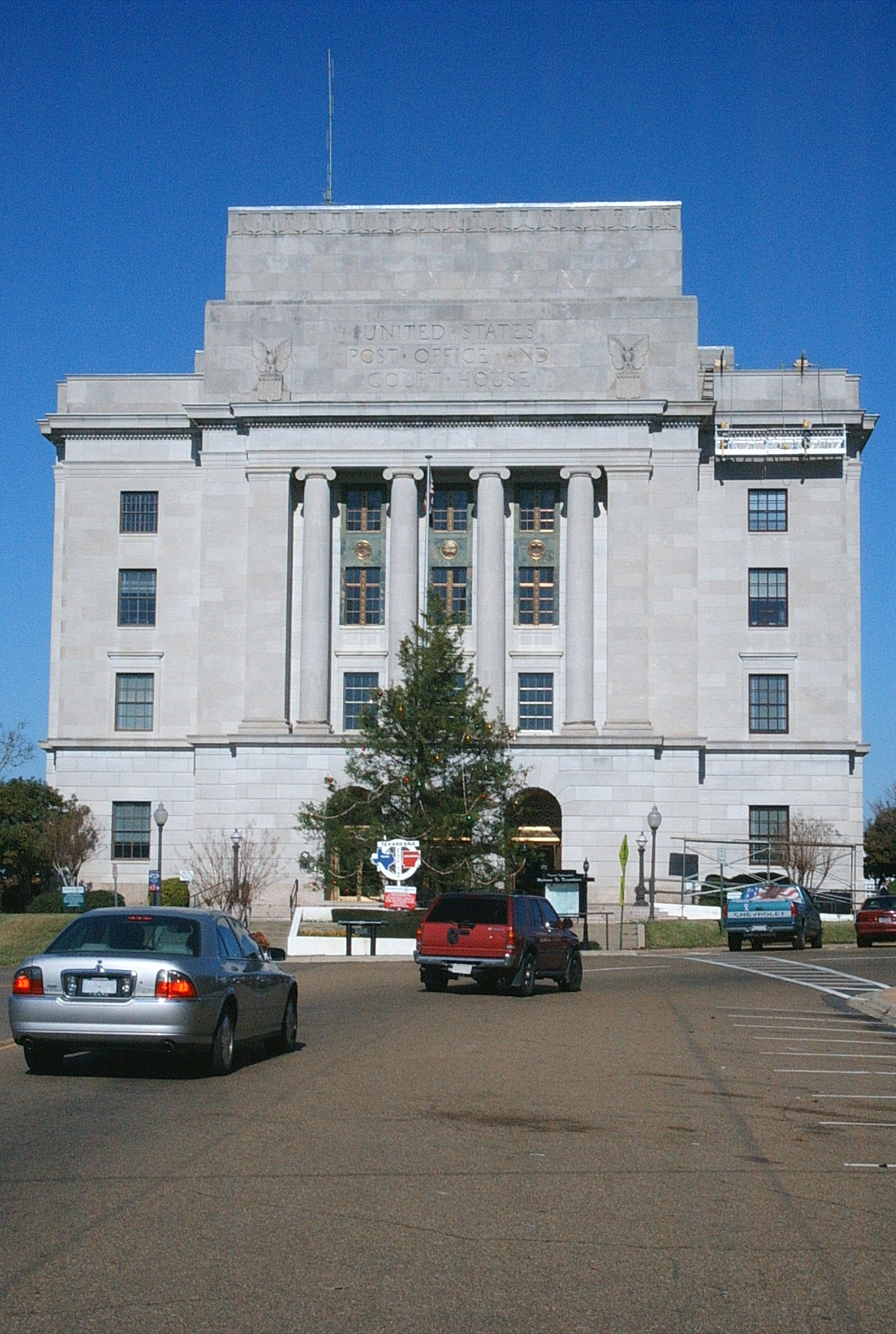
- U.S. Post Office and Courthouse in 2006

- Location within Arkansas Location within Texas Location within the United States
- Location: 500 N. State Line Ave., Texarkana, Arkansas
- Coordinates: 33°25′30″N 94°2′34″W
- Area: 1.4 acres (0.57 ha)
- Built: 1933
- Architect: Perkins, Chatten & Hammond; James A. Wetmore; Witt, Seibert & Halsey
- Architectural style: Beaux Arts
- NRHP reference No.: 00000245
- RTHL No.: 9512

Significant dates
- Added to NRHP: March 24, 2000
- Designated RTHL: 1970

The United States Post Office and Courthouse, also known as Texarkana U.S. Post Office and Federal Building and as Texarkana U.S. Post Office and Courthouse, is located on State Line Avenue in Texarkana, straddling the border between Arkansas and Texas. It is a courthouse of the United States District Court for the Western District of Arkansas and the United States District Court for the Eastern District of Texas.

The building was built in 1933 and was listed on the National Register of Historic Places in 2000.

The first courthouse built on this location was completed in 1892, serving as a courthouse until 1911, when it was succeeded by the erection of a separate courthouse entirely in Texas. The Texas-only courthouse later became the Texarkana Regional Arts Center. The earlier, border-straddling building continued to serve the Arkansas district alone until it was razed in 1930 to make way for the new construction, which was completed in 1933.

== Significance ==
Since its construction in 1931, the United States Post Office and Courthouse has remained the most prominent structure in Texarkana, due in no small measure to its location. The regularity of the downtown street grid is interrupted by the north–south path of State Line Avenue, which separates Texas and Arkansas. Located between Fifth and Sixth Streets, the federal building ensures its pivotal presence by occupying the sole site in the center of State Line Avenue. By straddling the boundary between two states, the building uniquely evinces its federal nature and function; no other federal building in the country is sited in two states.

At least twelve buildings, including the original U.S. Post Office and Courthouse and the Central Christian Church, were demolished or relocated to accommodate this new federal building, which significantly altered the street pattern. Witt, Seibert & Halsey of Texarkana, in association with Perkins, Chatten & Hammond of Chicago, were responsible for the building's design, with James A. Wetmore the acting supervising architect for the Treasury Department. R. O. Jameson prepared the original structural engineering drawings; R. F. Taylor was the mechanical engineer.

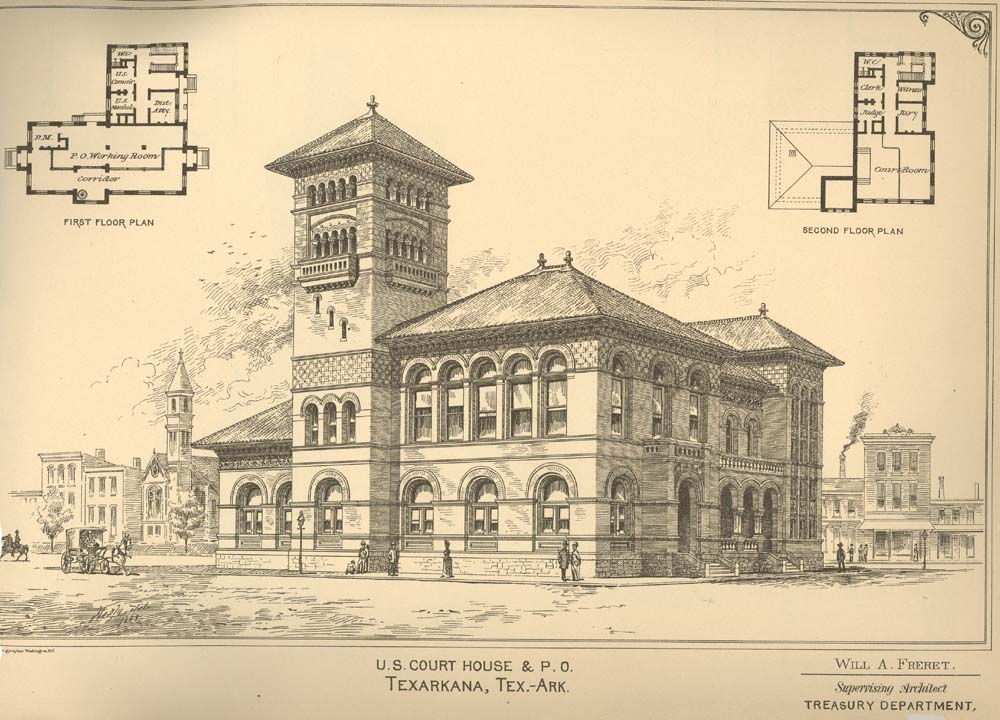
The 1888 Texarkana courthouse and post office, razed in 1930 to make way for the new building

No large-scale occupancy relocations have occurred and the building has retained most of its original functions, maintaining the stability of its connection with the community. The first floor post office, third floor courtrooms and judicial spaces, as well as many of the offices, still serve the purposes for which they were intended. Though modifications to the postal screen walls were made twice within eight years of construction, the building did not undergo significant change until new air conditioning, plaster soffits, and suspended fluorescent fixtures were added to judicial rooms in 1957. The following year a conveyor areaway and stair were added leading to the basement on the Arkansas side. The 1970s brought more changes to the postal screen walls, as well as the addition of air conditioning equipment and ductwork with suspended acoustic tile ceilings to the offices on floors two through five. It is critical to the life of the building that its current functions be maintained.

== Architectural description ==
Though occasional Art Deco features betray its date of construction, the U.S. Post Office and Courthouse in Texarkana is steadfastly Beaux Arts in form and organization. Symmetrical with respect to the state line, the gray Arkansas Limestone building is a rectangular steel and concrete structure composed of five stories, a full basement, and a service penthouse. The basement and ground floors form a rusticated plinth with a base of Texas Pink granite and recessed joints in the limestone ground floor walls. On the south side, three arched openings penetrate this plinth, expressing depth and serving as the main entry to the building. Limestone walls in running bond pattern clad floors two, three, and four, where windows reveal the presence of each level. The east and west sides of this massive intermediate section of the building are articulated by the projection of the three outer bays at either end and by the presence of Doric pilasters between the seven central bays. Seven Tuscan pilasters likewise march across this portion of the north facade, while on the south elevation four Ionic columns extend upward from the plinth to a limestone entablature that wraps the building at the level of the fifth floor. Above the cornice on the west, north, and east sides, the building steps back considerably from the street facade. On the south, or front, side, this narrower fifth floor remains in plane with the street facade. In addition the fifth floor is capped by a service penthouse at the south end. This means that roughly one third of the height of the main facade exists above the cornice, affording it a much greater prominence than the other facades. The extra mass above the cornice, unusual in a Beaux Arts design, is inscribed with the building's name and is banded with a repeating Art Deco relief pattern in the stone.

With exceptions, the original plan strategies are clearly evident in the building today. The second through fifth floors are for the most part organized as a series of perimeter offices opening into a ring of corridors which in turn surround a core consisting of restrooms, service spaces, and a small but effective light court. Two large double-height courtrooms occupy the north end of the third and fourth floors and remain close to original condition. Many of the perimeter spaces have suffered a loss of volume and character from the installation of suspended acoustical tile ceilings. New gypsum board partitions have intruded into the second and fifth floor offices, while one third of the fifth floor corridors have been overtaken as work space.

The elevator lobbies on all floors remain largely intact. Although the postal lobby, located immediately beyond the first floor elevator lobby, has undergone repeated modifications since construction, including the introduction of an inappropriate post office box "hut" and customer corral, it retains much of its original character. Those areas borrowed from the lobby for adjacent postal work rooms continue to exhibit the original plaster ceilings and wood wainscots. Ancillary postal spaces on the building's west side best exhibit the original wood trim, plaster ceilings, and door and transom treatment, though these features can be found in smaller quantities elsewhere in the building.

== See also ==
- National Register of Historic Places listings in Miller County, Arkansas
- National Register of Historic Places listings in Bowie County, Texas
- Recorded Texas Historic Landmarks in Bowie County
- List of United States federal courthouses
- List of United States post offices
