= Caddo Valley Academy Complex =

- U.S. National Register of Historic Places
- U.S. Historic district
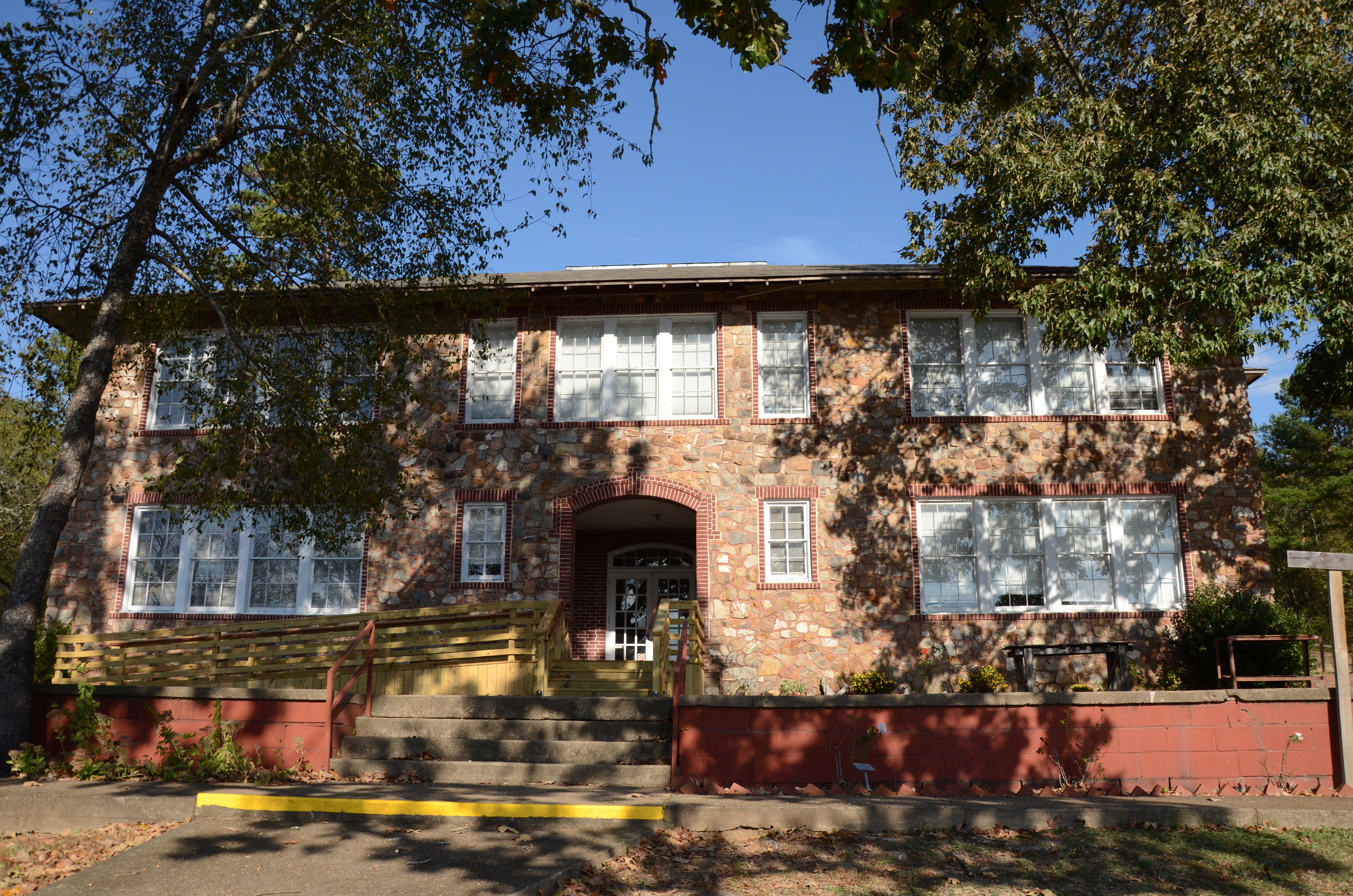

- Location within Arkansas Location within the United States
- Location: Junction 9th and Main Streets, Norman, Arkansas
- Coordinates: 34°27′21″N 93°40′45″W
- Area: 3 acres (1.2 ha)
- Built: 1924
- Built by: Swift
- Architect: Witt, Seibert & Halsey
- Architectural style: Bungalow/craftsman
- NRHP reference No.: 02000485
- Added to NRHP: May 16, 2002

The Caddo Valley Academy Complex is a collection of former school buildings in Norman, Arkansas. Set well back from Main Street (Arkansas Highway 8 near the junction of 9th Street and Smokey Hollow Road, the complex includes a two-story fieldstone main building, a smaller single-story home economics building (located down the slope northwest of the main building), both located northwest of 9th Street, and a large concrete block gym with a gabled roof, located across 9th Street from the other two. The main school, built in 1924, is an outstanding local example of Craftsman styling; the 1937 home economics building also has Craftsman style; the gym was built in 1951, and is vernacular in style. The school was used until the local schools were consolidated into a new facility in 1971.

The complex was listed on the National Register of Historic Places in 2002. The main school was designed by Bayard Witt of the firm Witt, Seibert & Halsey of Texarkana, Arkansas.

== See also ==
- National Register of Historic Places listings in Montgomery County, Arkansas
