= Dr. H.A. Longino House =

Historic house in Arkansas, United States

- Dr. H. A. Longino House
- U.S. National Register of Historic Places
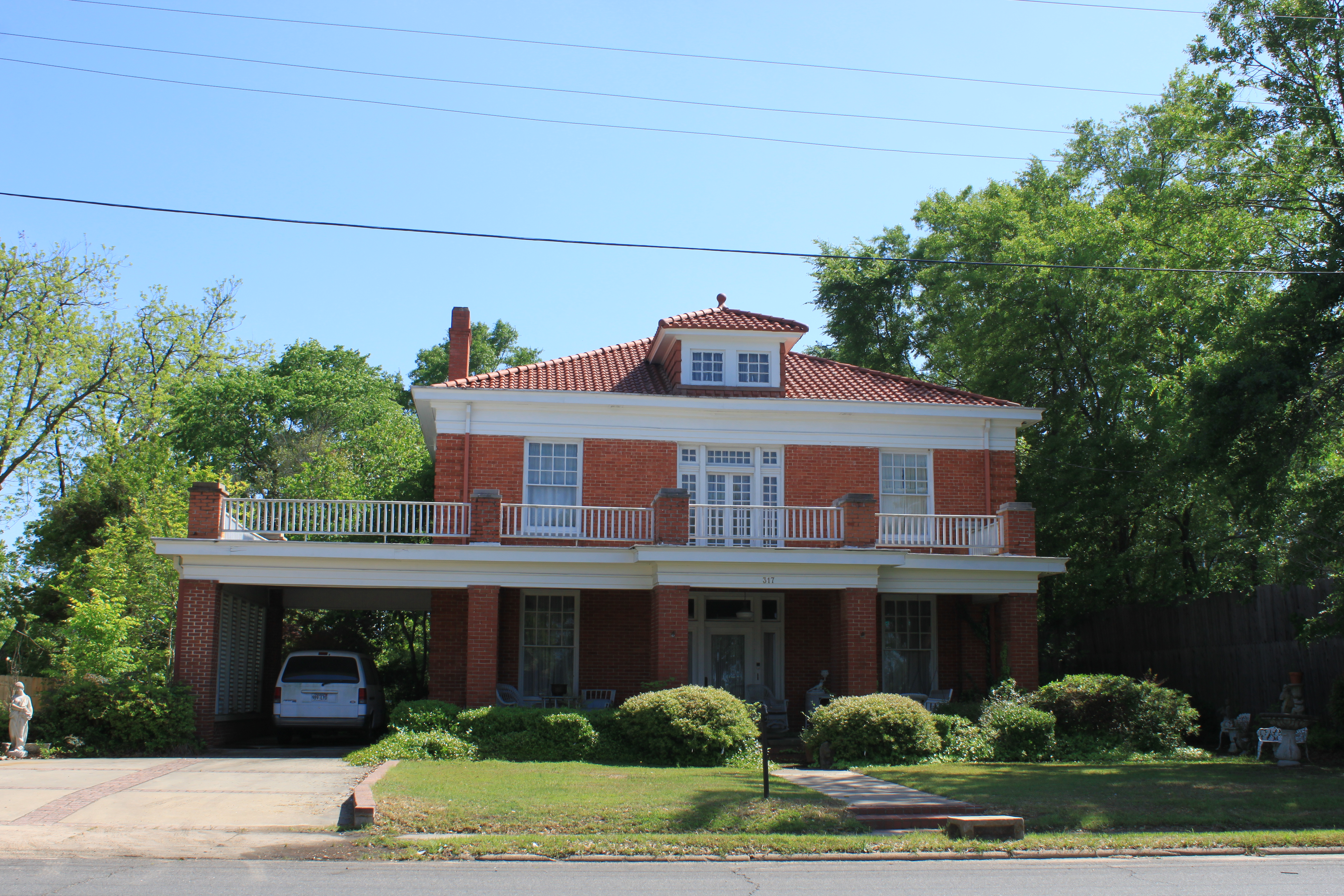

- Location within Arkansas Location within the United States
- Location: 317 W. Main St., Magnolia, Arkansas
- Coordinates: 33°16′0″N 93°14′36″W
- Area: less than one acre
- Built: 1910
- Architect: Eugene C. Seibert
- NRHP reference No.: 82002098
- Added to NRHP: June 14, 1982

The Dr. H. A. Longino House is a historic house at 317 West Main Street in Magnolia, Arkansas. The two-story brick structure was built in 1910 for a prominent local doctor, and is one of a small number of surviving designs known to have been created by Eugene C. Seibert, a prominent local architect of the period. When built, it was one of the most imposing houses in the town. It is three bays wide, and is finished in salmon-colored brick, with a terracotta roof. It has a large front porch, which is terminated at one end by a porte-cochere. Stylistically, the house represents a transition between the revival styles of the 19th century and the Craftsman styling which became popular in the following decades.

The house was listed on the National Register of Historic Places in 1982. In April 2019, the owners deeded this property to South Arkansas Heritage Museum, Inc., a non-profit historical museum based in Magnolia, AR. Columbia County Arkansas Property Tax Records (https://www.arcountydata.com/propsearch.asp?county=Columbia)

== See also ==
- National Register of Historic Places listings in Columbia County, Arkansas
