= Miller County Courthouse (Arkansas) =

- U.S. National Register of Historic Places
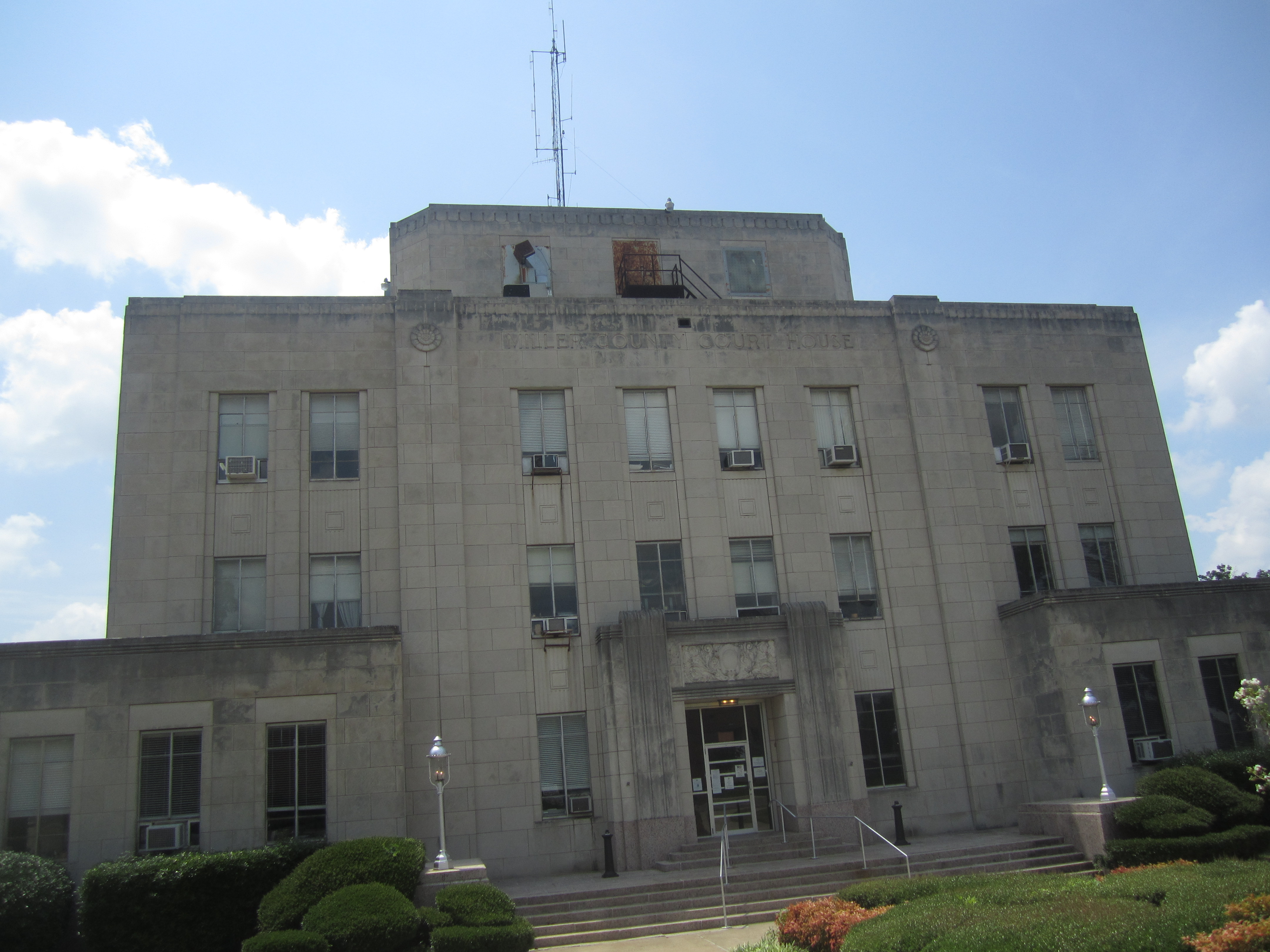

- Location within Arkansas Location within the United States
- Location: 400 Laurel St., Texarkana, Arkansas
- Coordinates: 33°25′35″N 94°1′38″W
- Area: 4 acres (1.6 ha)
- Built: 1939
- Built by: Manhattan Construction
- Architect: Eugene C. Seibert
- Architectural style: Art Deco
- NRHP reference No.: 98000578
- Added to NRHP: May 29, 1998

The Miller County Courthouse is a historic county courthouse at 400 Laurel Street in Texarkana, Arkansas, the county seat of Miller County. The four-story Art Deco building was designed by Eugene C. Seibert and built in 1939 with funding from the Works Progress Administration. It is the second courthouse built for the county, and is an excellent local example of the WPA Moderne style of Art Deco architecture. The lower floors of the building are occupied by county offices and court facilities, and the fourth floor houses the county jail.

The building was listed on the National Register of Historic Places in 1998.

== See also ==
- National Register of Historic Places listings in Miller County, Arkansas
