= Texarkana, Arkansas, Municipal Building =

- U.S. National Register of Historic Places
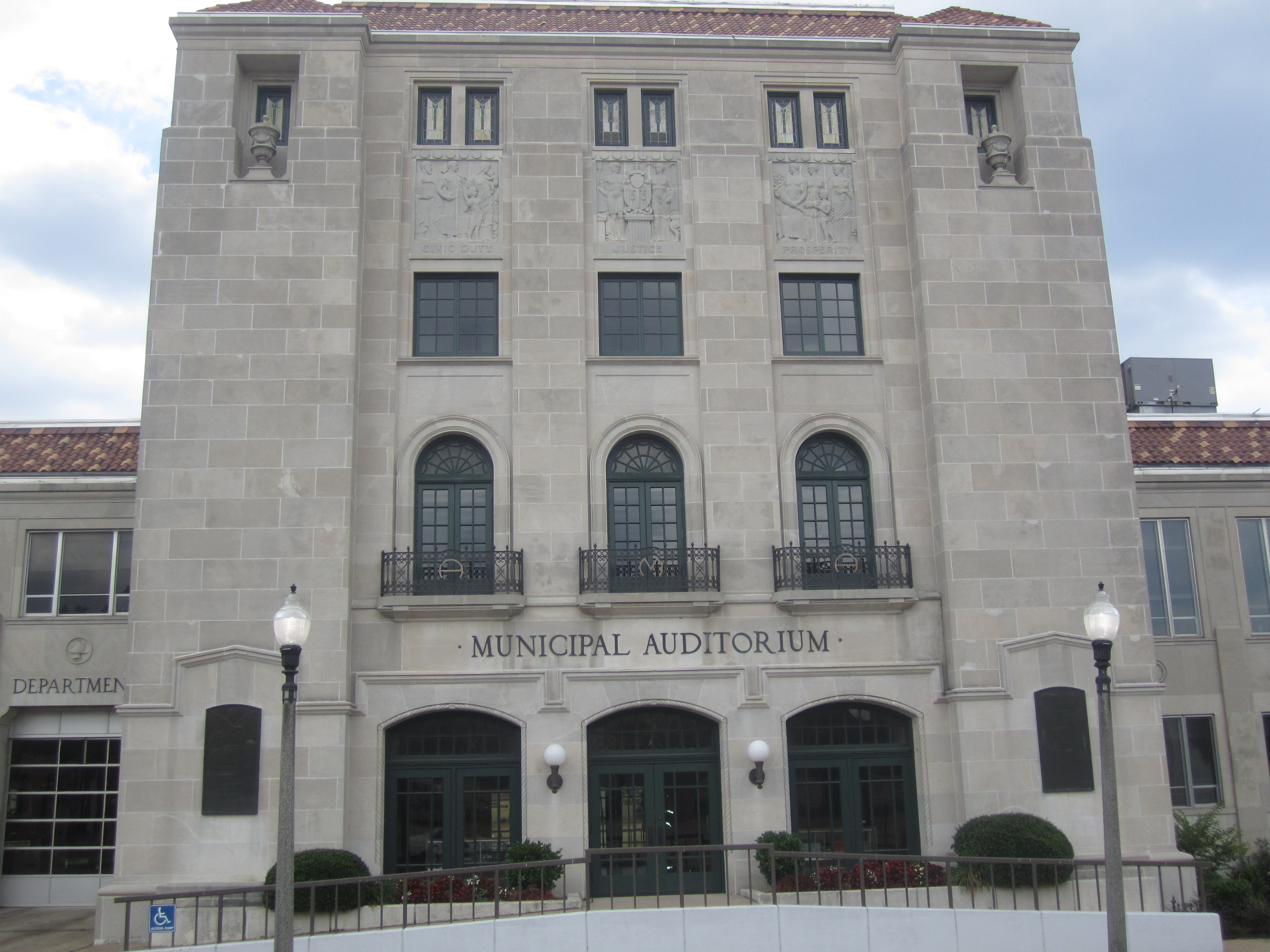

- Location within Arkansas Location within the United States
- Location: Walnut and third Sts., Texarkana, Arkansas
- Coordinates: 33°25′25″N 94°2′22″W
- Area: less than one acre
- Built: 1927
- Built by: McGehee, Stewart Construction
- Architect: Witt, Seibert & Halsey
- Architectural style: Collegiate Gothic, Art Deco
- NRHP reference No.: 03001456
- Added to NRHP: January 21, 2004

The Municipal Building of Texarkana, Arkansas, is located at Walnut and Third Streets in the downtown of the city. It was built between 1927 and 1930 to a design by Witt, Seibert & Halsey, which has elements of the Collegiate Gothic and Art Deco styles. The building houses a large auditorium in the center, with city offices in one wing and the main fire station in the other. It also houses the city jail. The building is located about three blocks from the state line with Texarkana, Texas. The building was listed on the National Register of Historic Places in 2004.

== See also ==
- National Register of Historic Places listings in Miller County, Arkansas
