= St. John's Episcopal Church (Camden, Arkansas) =

Historic church in Arkansas, United States

- U.S. National Register of Historic Places
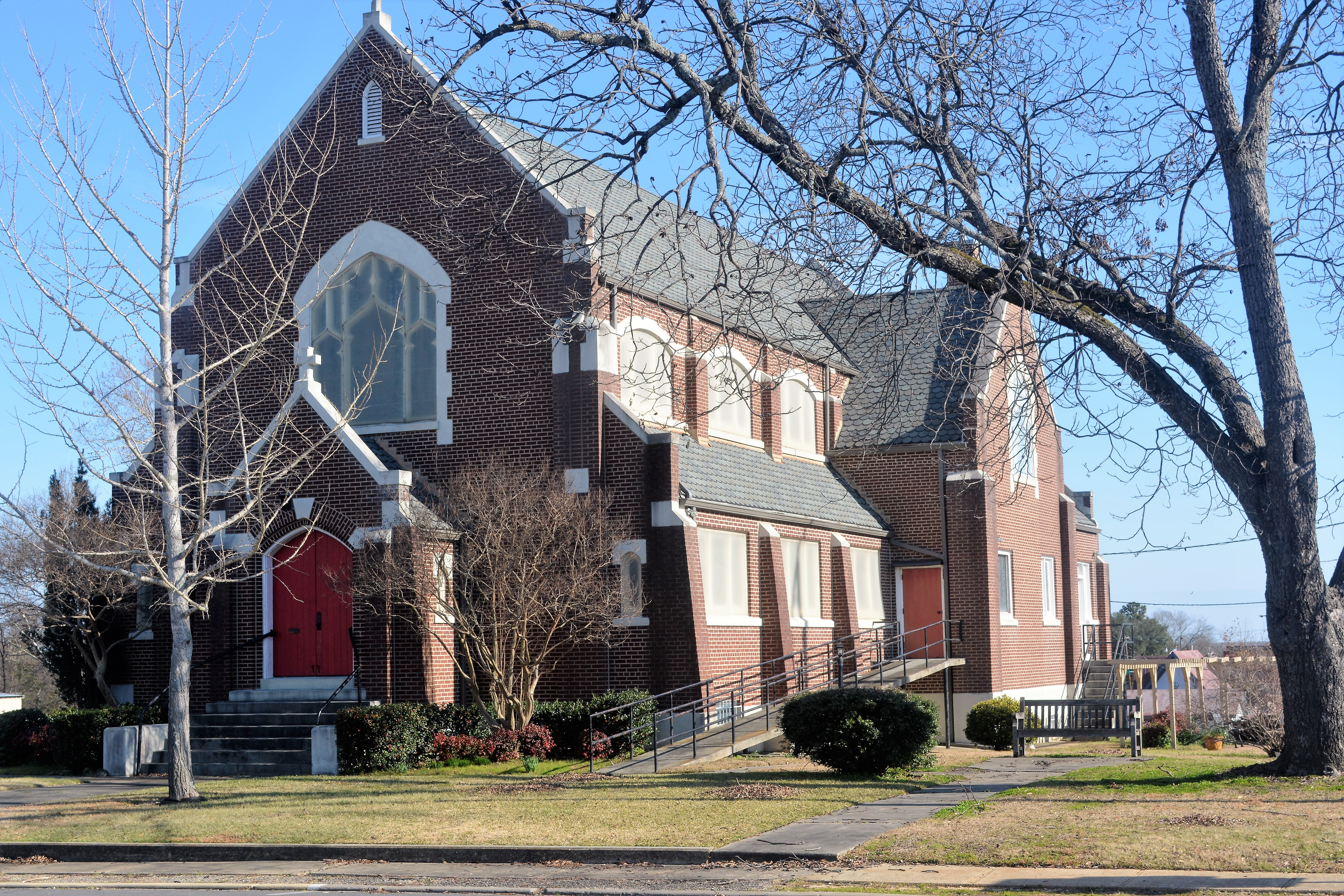

- Location within Arkansas Location within the United States
- Location: 117 Harrison St. Camden, Arkansas
- Coordinates: 33°35′10″N 92°49′54″W
- Area: 1 acre (0.40 ha)
- Built: 1925
- Architect: Witt, Seibert & Halsey
- Architectural style: Gothic Revival
- NRHP reference No.: 100000556
- Added to NRHP: January 24, 2017

The St. John's Episcopal Church is a historic church at 117 Harrison Street in Camden, Arkansas. It is a congregation of the Episcopal Diocese of Arkansas.

In 2015, the church reported 20 members; in 2023, it reported 16 members. No membership statistics were reported in 2024 national parochial reports. Plate and pledge financial support reported by the church in 2024 was $30,824. Average Sunday Attendance (ASA) reported in 2024 was 12 persons.

== Building ==
The church building is a large cruciform structure, built out of brick with trim of concrete cast to resemble stone. Its Gothic features include buttresses at the corners and along the sides, and pointed-arch openings for entrances and windows at the gable ends. The church was built in 1925-26 for a congregation established in 1850; it was designed by the Texarkana firm of Witt, Seibert & Halsey. It is the city's only Episcopal church.

The church was listed on the National Register of Historic Places in 2017.

== See also ==
- National Register of Historic Places listings in Ouachita County, Arkansas
