= Bottoms House =

Historic house in Arkansas, United States

- U.S. National Register of Historic Places
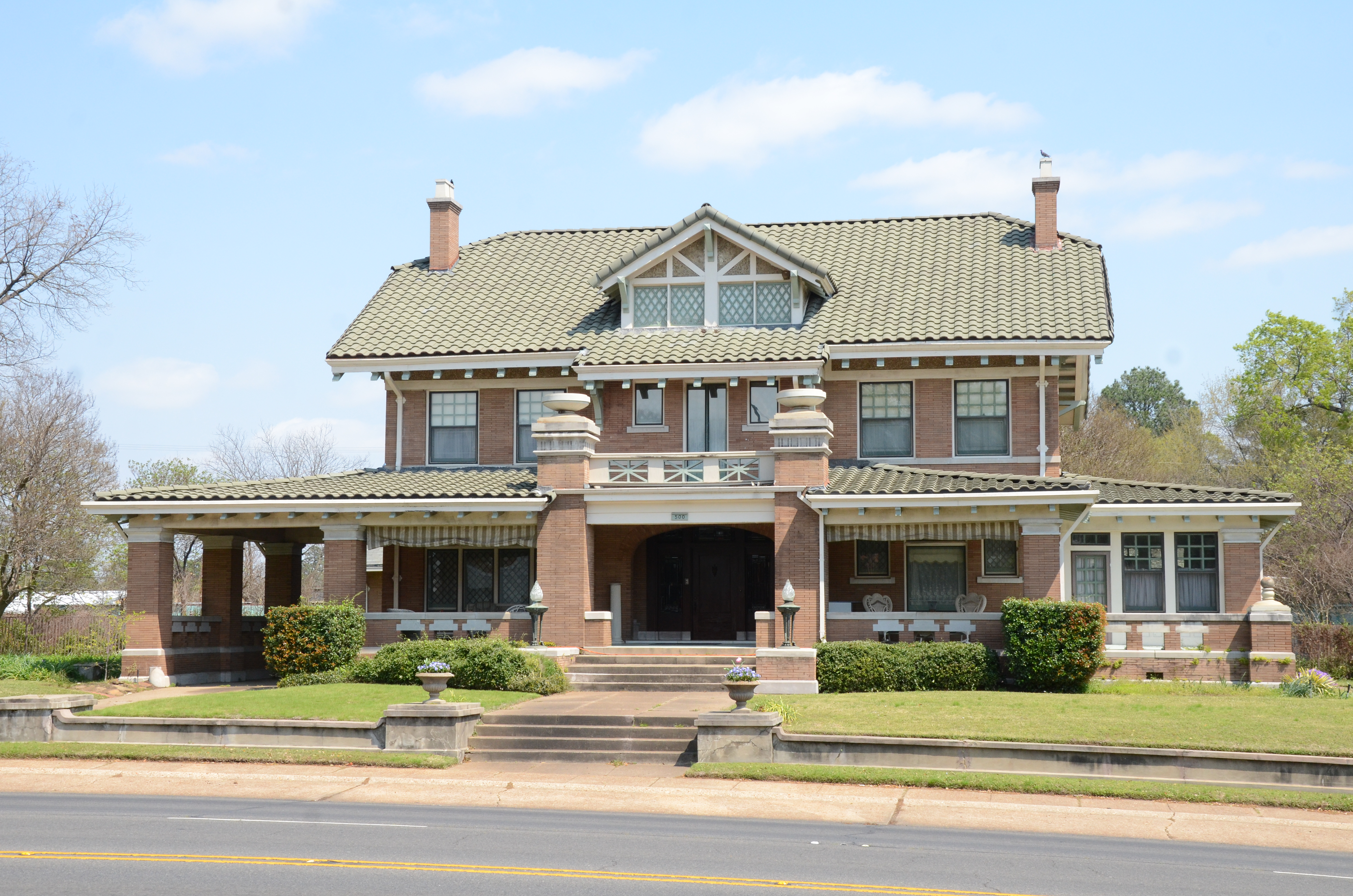

- Location within Arkansas Location within the United States
- Location: 500 Hickory, Texarkana, Arkansas
- Coordinates: 33°25′44″N 94°2′5″W
- Area: 1 acre (0.40 ha)
- Built: 1910
- Architect: C. D. Hill & Company; Bayard Witt
- Architectural style: Prairie School, Bungalow/craftsman
- NRHP reference No.: 82002124
- Added to NRHP: June 8, 1982

The Bottoms House is a historic house at 500 Hickory Street in Texarkana, Arkansas, USA. It is a 2 1/2-story buff brick structure with a jerkin-headed gable roof and a large gable dormer, set on a raised corner. It was designed by Bayard Witt, a Texarkana architect, and built in 1910 for George Bottoms, one of area's principal lumber businessmen. The house's basic design follows the Prairie School, with broad lines exemplified by its sweeping single-story porch, although the half-timbered detailing found inside is Tudor in inspiration, and other details, such as colored windows and exposed rafters, are Craftsman in orientation.

The house was listed on the National Register of Historic Places in 1982.

== See also ==
- National Register of Historic Places listings in Miller County, Arkansas
