= Little River County Courthouse =

- U.S. National Register of Historic Places
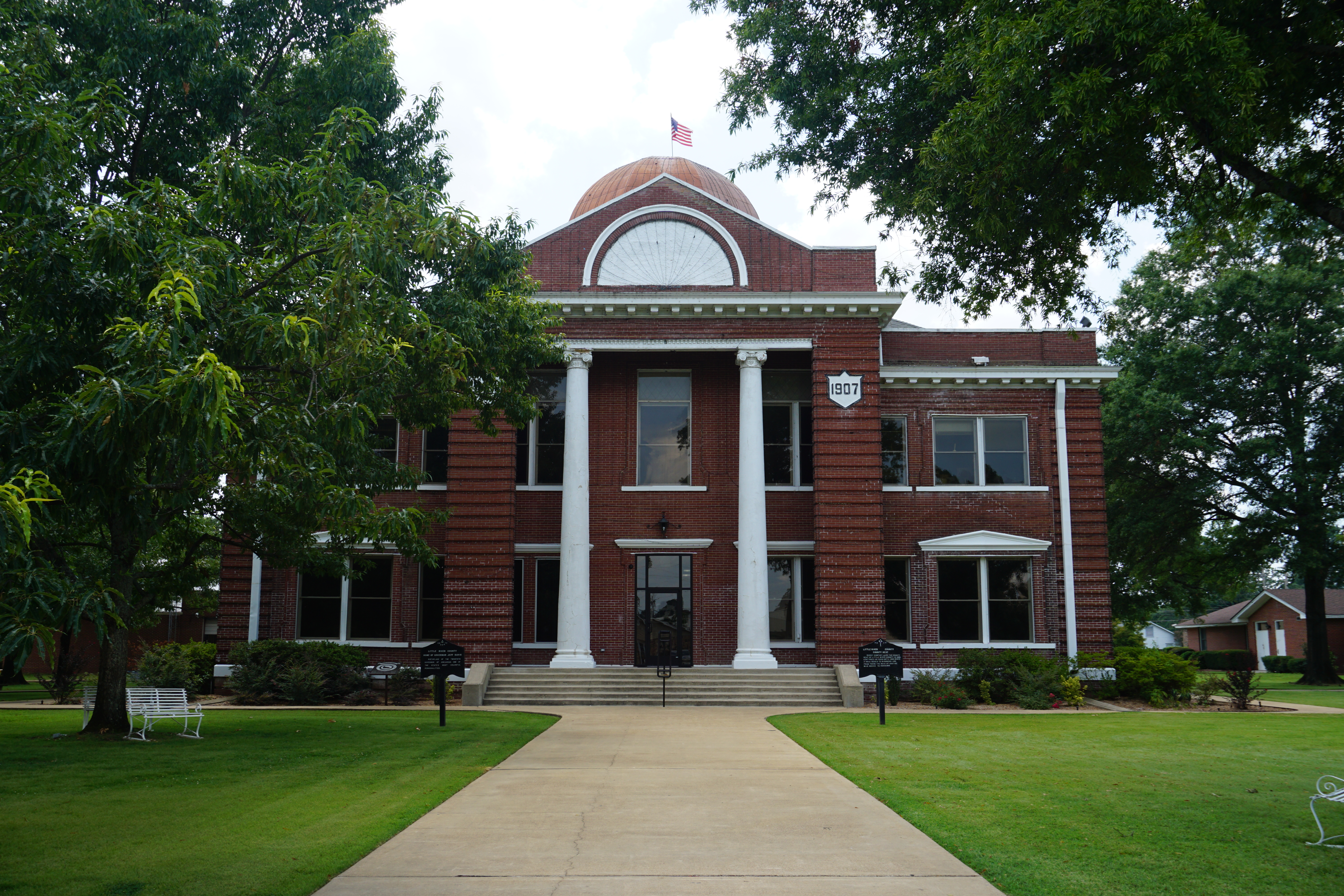

- Location within Arkansas Location within the United States
- Location: Main and 2nd Sts., Ashdown, Arkansas
- Coordinates: 33°40′20″N 94°7′58″W
- Area: 1 acre (0.40 ha)
- Built: 1907
- Built by: Sidney Stewart
- NRHP reference No.: 76000427
- Added to NRHP: September 29, 1976

The Little River County Courthouse is a courthouse at Main and 2nd Streets in Ashdown, Arkansas, United States, the county seat of Little River County. Built in 1907, it is a roughly square red brick structure with Classical Revival styling and a dome rising from the center of its hipped roof. It was listed on the National Register of Historic Places in 1976.

== History ==
Little River County was cut from Sevier County and established in 1867. The county seat was established in Alleene in 1867 and was moved to Richmond in 1880. The courthouse burned in 1882 and citizens of Richmond rebuilt the courthouse for free in hopes of keeping county administration in town, where it remained until moving to Rocky Comfort in 1902. Another election moved the courthouse to Ashdown in 1906 and the present structure was built the following year.

== See also ==
- National Register of Historic Places listings in Little River County, Arkansas
