= Millwood State Park =

Park in Arkansas, USA

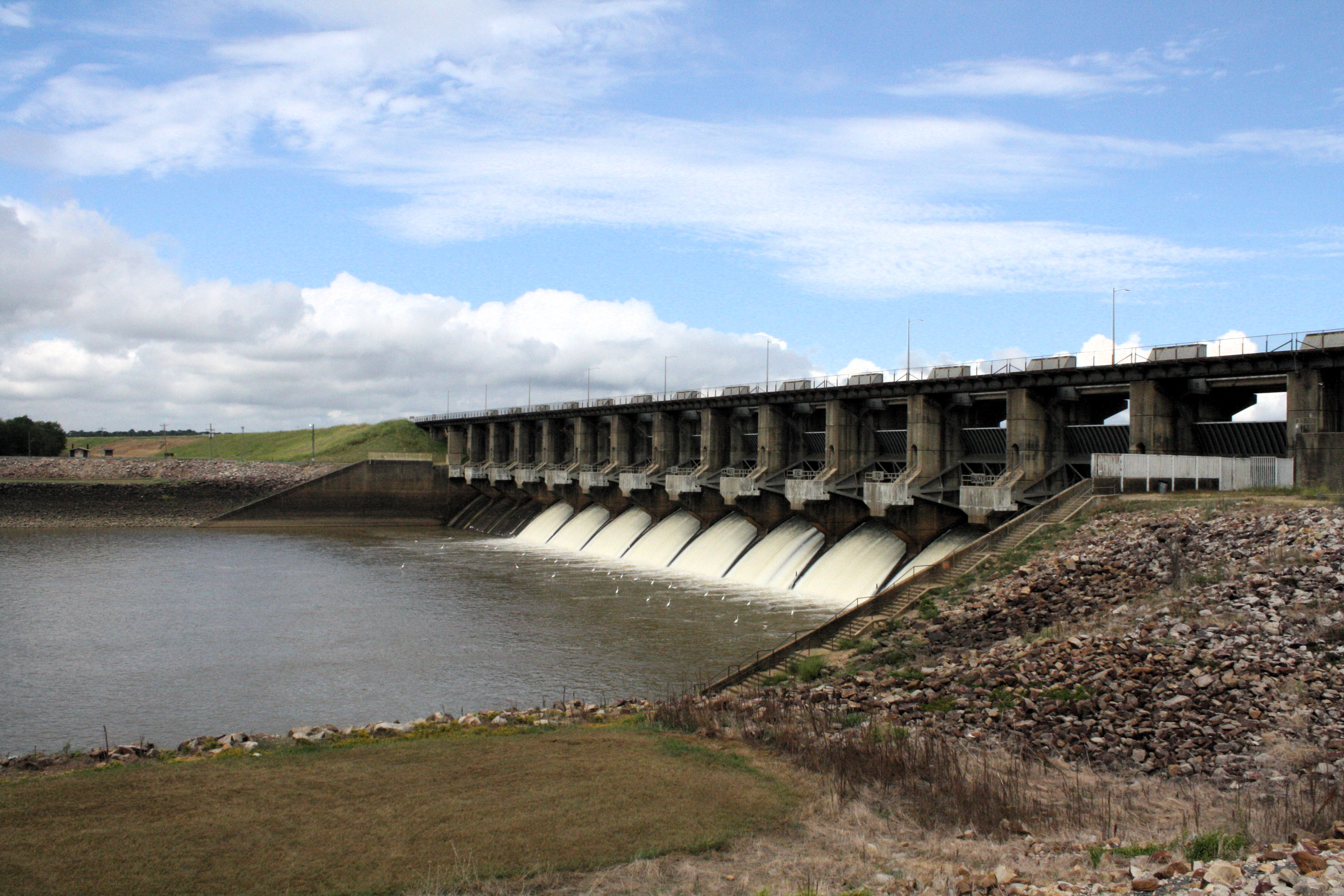
- Millwood Dam

- Location within Arkansas Location within the United States
- Interactive map of Millwood State Park
- Location: Little River County, Arkansas, United States
- Coordinates: 33°40′38″N 93°59′15″W
- Area: 824 acres (333 ha)
- Elevation: 269 feet (82 m)
- Established: April 1, 1976
- Administrator: Arkansas Department of Parks, Heritage and Tourism
- Website: Official website
- Arkansas State Parks

Millwood State Park is a public recreation area known for its fishing and wildlife habitats located along the southern side of 29,500-acre (11,900 ha) Millwood Lake, nine miles (14 km) east of Ashdown in Little River County, Arkansas.

== History ==
[T]he park was established about a decade after the U.S. Army Corps of Engineers built 29,500-acre Millwood Lake north of Texarkana in Miller County. Held in place by a 3.3-mile-long earthen dam (the longest of its type in Arkansas), the lake’s trademark timber stands have made it a bass-fishing haven by providing cover vegetation and a food source that keep the fish in shallow, more accessible water.

The lake was built in 1966 on the Little River, some sixteen miles above its confluence with the Red River. In addition to the Little River, the Cossatot and Saline rivers also contribute to the lake.

Among several recreational areas the Corps of Engineers established on the lake’s shoreline was Cypress Slough, at the southwestern end of Millwood Dam. On April 1, 1976, the Corps signed a lease agreement with the State Parks Division of the Arkansas Department of Parks and Tourism, and Cypress Slough became Millwood State Park. The site was chosen because of the important role the various lakes in the Little Red River basin play in controlling flooding on the Red River below Lake Texoma.

Due to the Corps of Engineers’ involvement, a combination of state and federal funds was used to expand the park’s facilities. Additional funding over the years has greatly improved the park. The lake and park take the name “Millwood” from a frontier river landing in the area, which was in use between 1845 and 1875.

== Activities and amenities ==
The park offers camping and picnicking sites, hiking and bike trails, marina with boat rentals, and interpretive activities.
