= Little River County Training School Historic District =

Historic district in Arkansas, United States

- Little River County Training School Historic District (Former Ashdown Junior High School)
- U.S. National Register of Historic Places
- U.S. Historic district
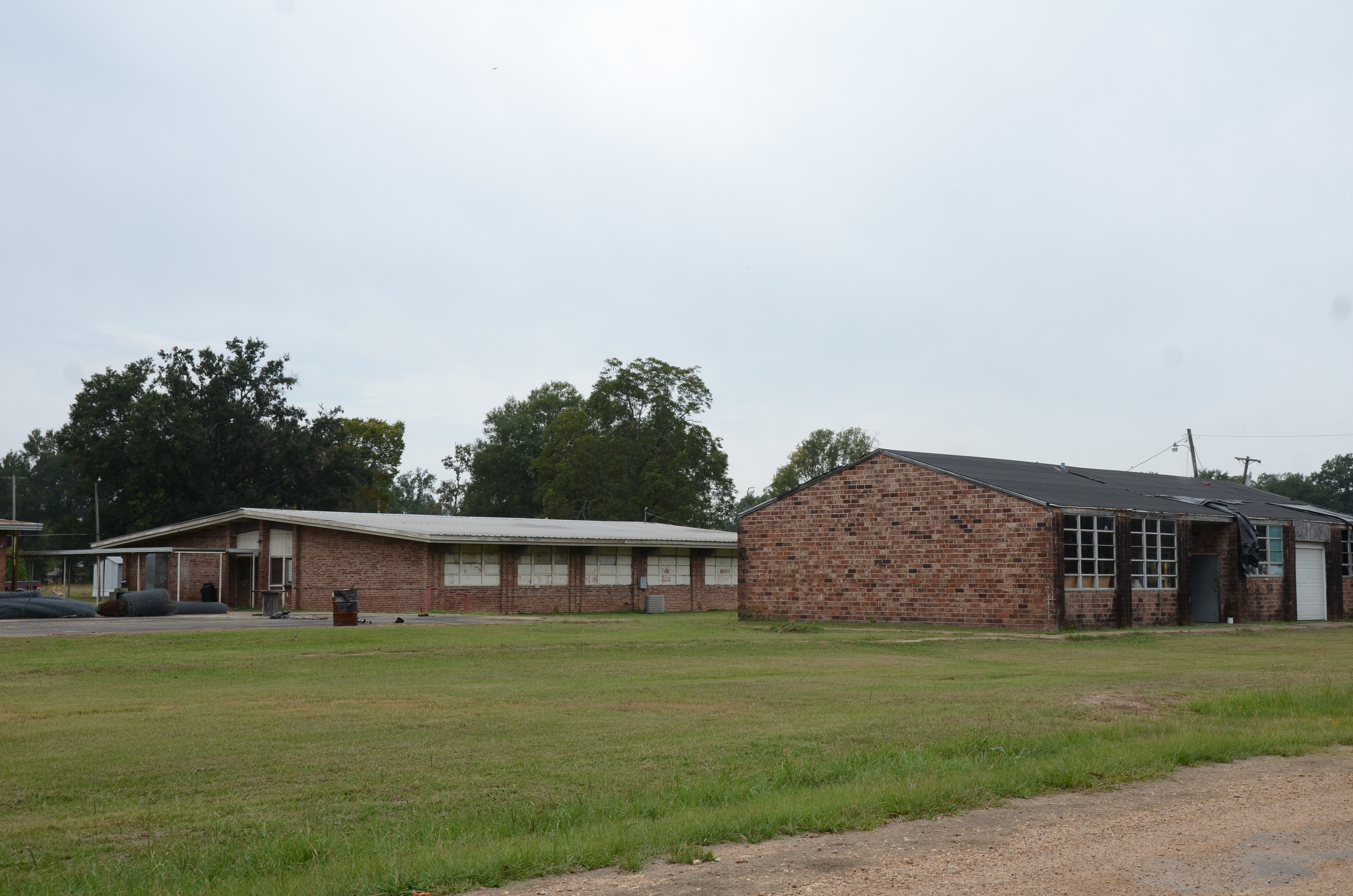

- Location within Arkansas Location within the United States
- Location: 100 W. Hamilton St., Ashdown, Arkansas
- Coordinates: 33°40′7″N 94°7′59″W
- Area: 2.7 acres (1.1 ha)
- Built: 1962
- NRHP reference No.: 15000994
- Added to NRHP: January 26, 2016

The Little River County Training School Historic District encompasses the surviving buildings of a defunct once-segregated vocational school in Ashdown, Arkansas. It occupies two city blocks, bounded by Martin Luther King, Jr. Drive, and Hamilton, Wood, and Byrne Streets. The surviving buildings are a classroom building, the gymnasium, and the shop building. All are single story brick structures, and were built between 1962 and 1965. They represent the last surviving buildings in Little River County that were used as segregated facilities. The school was first developed in the 1920s, with funding and other support from the Rosenwald Fund; a building burned down in 1957, and another in 1980. The school was used in an integrated setting, mainly as a junior high school, until 1979, when the new Junior High opened for the 1979–1980 school year. The building on Hamilton Street was utilized as a Primary Center until it burned, in 1980.

The district was listed on the National Register of Historic Places in 2016.

== See also ==
- National Register of Historic Places listings in Little River County, Arkansas
