= Texarkana and Fort Smith Railway =

Former railway in Texas and Arkansas, USA

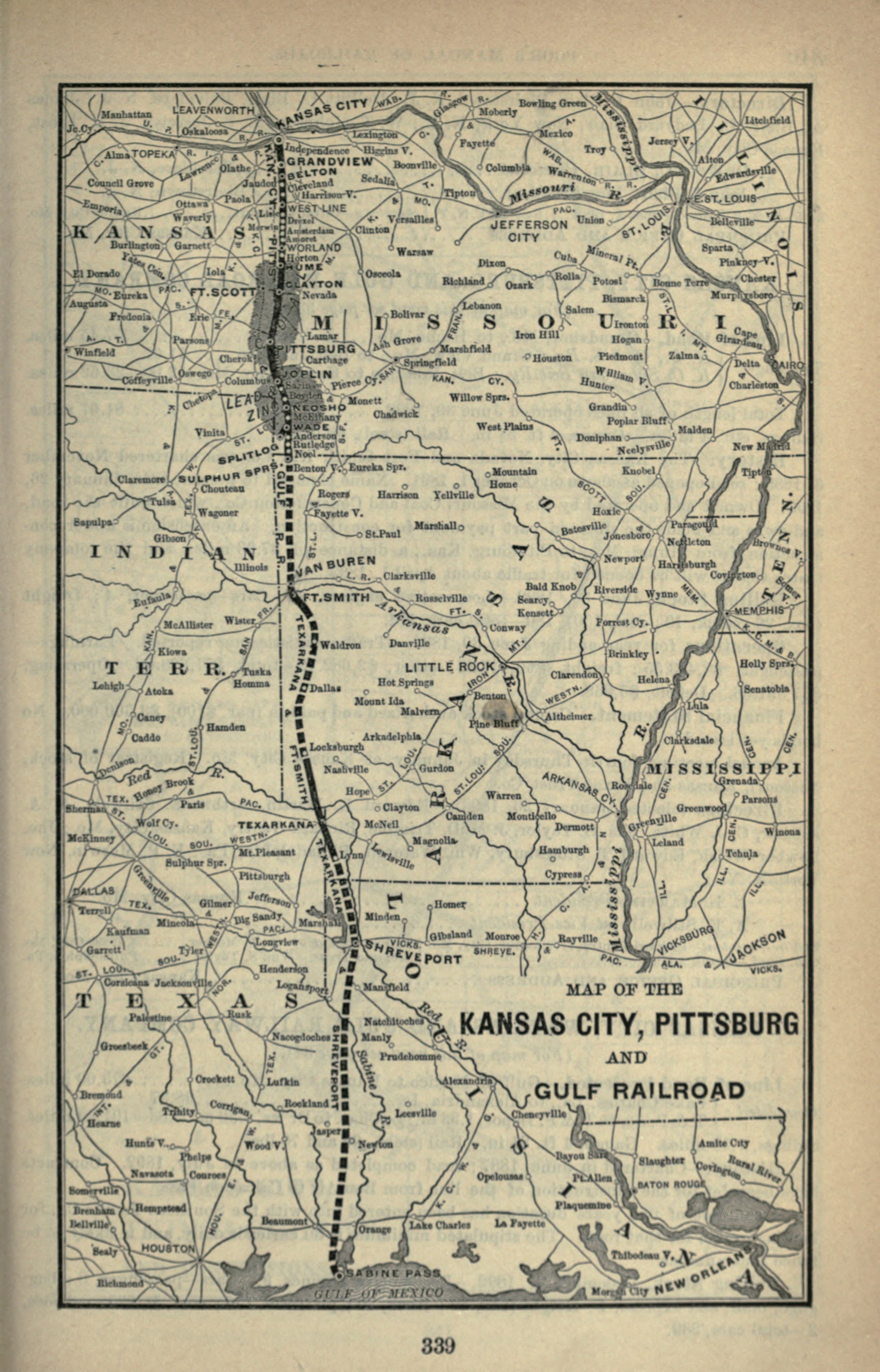
- System map displaying the T&FS lines as part of the Kansas City, Pittsburg and Gulf Railroad, 1893

Overview
- Headquarters: Texarkana, Texas
- Locale: Arkansas and Texas
- Dates of operation: 1885–1943
- Predecessor: Texarkana and Northern Railway (name changed to T&FS, 1889)
- Successor: Kansas City Southern Railway

Technical
- Track gauge: 4 ft 8 1/2 in (1,435 mm) standard gauge

The Texarkana and Fort Smith Railway was the Texas subsidiary of the Kansas City Southern Railway, operating railroad lines in the states of Arkansas and Texas, with headquarters at Texarkana, Texas.

On June 18, 1885, the Texarkana and Northern Railway, organized by William. L. Whitaker, a lumberman and railroad contractor in Texarkana, was chartered by the state of Texas, and built a ten-mile line from Texarkana north to Whitaker's timber lands along the Red River. On July 9, 1889, the charter was amended, changing the name to Texarkana and Fort Smith Railway, and granting authority to extend the line all the way to Fort Smith, Arkansas.

By 1892, when the T&FS had built another 16 miles north from the Red River to Wilton, Arkansas, the Kansas City, Pittsburg and Gulf Railroad gained control of the railway and set about using the T&FS as the Texas link in its planned route between Kansas City and the Gulf of Mexico. At that time, Article X of the Texas Constitution required all railroads operating in the state to be headquartered in Texas.

By 1897, the T&FS had extended its rails 85 miles from Wilton north to Mena, Arkansas, as well as 29 miles southward from Texarkana to the Arkansas-Louisiana border, where it joined KCP&G rails leading to Shreveport. South of Shreveport, the T&FS also constructed a line from the Louisiana-Texas border on the Sabine River southward to Beaumont and Port Arthur, Texas, a new city created as the marine terminus of the route. The entire KCP&G route opened from Kansas City to the Gulf on November 1, 1897, with the T&FS operating 105 miles of the main line in Arkansas and 79 miles in Texas.

In the wake of a financial crisis, the KCP&G was reorganized as the Kansas City Southern Railway on April 1, 1900. In 1934, in a landmark decision, the Supreme Court upheld an Interstate Commerce Commission ruling that overrode the Texas law requiring in-state railroad headquarters. Subsequently, the Texarkana and Fort Smith Railway was leased to the Kansas City Southern in 1934 and merged on December 31, 1943.

== See also ==
- Texarkana and Fort Smith Railway Depot, the T&FS's only surviving depot, in Wilton, Arkansas
