= Judge Jefferson Thomas Cowling House =

Historic house in Arkansas, United States

- U.S. National Register of Historic Places
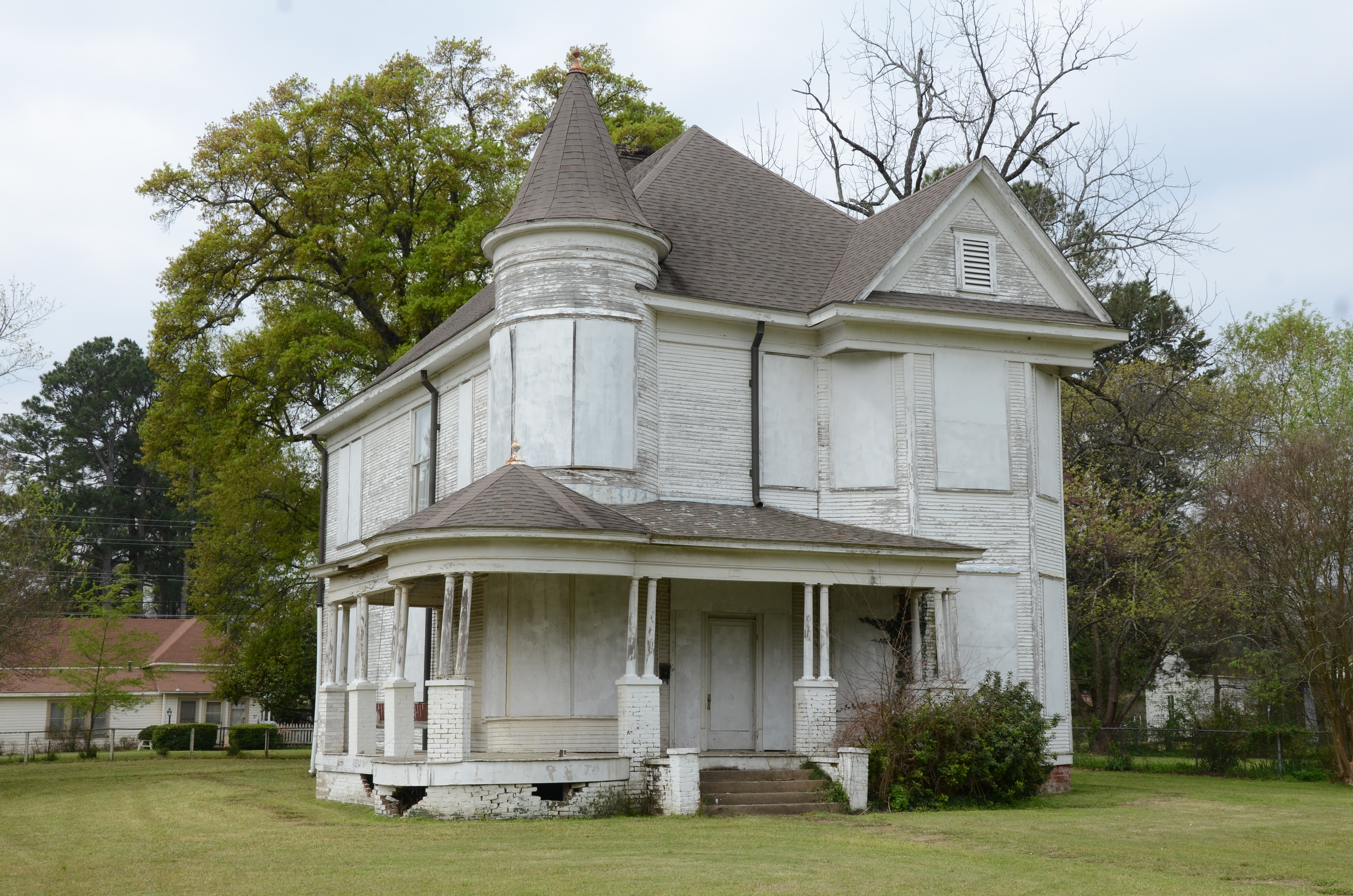

- Location within Arkansas Location within the United States
- Location: 611 Willow St., Ashdown, Arkansas
- Coordinates: 33°40′44″N 94°7′44″W
- Area: less than one acre
- Built: 1910
- Architectural style: Late 19th And 20th Century Revivals
- NRHP reference No.: 88002823
- Added to NRHP: December 8, 1988

The Judge Jefferson Thomas Cowling House is a historic house at 611 Willow Street in Ashdown, Arkansas. It is a 2 1/2-story wood-frame structure exhibiting architectural styling transitional between the Queen Anne and Colonial Revival styles. It features the asymmetrical massing and busy roof line of the Queen Anne style, with a projecting corner section with a conical turret, while its porch columns are more classical in form than those typically found in the Queen Anne. The house was built in 1910 for J. T. Cowling, one of Ashdown's most prominent early settlers.

The house was listed on the National Register of Historic Places in 1988.

== See also ==
- National Register of Historic Places listings in Little River County, Arkansas
