= Dierks =

Dierks may refer to:

== People ==
- Cap Dierks (1932–2021), American politician from Nebraska
- Dieter Dierks (born 1943), a German record producer
- Dierks Bentley (born 1975), an American musician

== Places ==
- Dierks, Arkansas, a city in Howard County, Arkansas
- Dierks Lake, a body of water near Dierks, AR

== Other ==
- Dierks Bentley (album), released in 2003
