= National Register of Historic Places listings in Little River County, Arkansas =

Location of Little River County in Arkansas

This is a list of the National Register of Historic Places listings in Little River County, Arkansas.

This is intended to be a complete list of the properties and districts on the National Register of Historic Places in Little River County, Arkansas, United States. The locations of National Register properties and districts for which the latitude and longitude coordinates are included below, may be seen in a map.

There are 16 properties and districts listed on the National Register in the county, and one former listing.

Contents: Counties in Arkansas
- Arkansas
- Ashley
- Baxter
- Benton
- Boone
- Bradley
- Calhoun
- Carroll
- Chicot
- Clark
- Clay
- Cleburne
- Cleveland
- Columbia
- Conway
- Craighead
- Crawford
- Crittenden
- Cross
- Dallas
- Desha
- Drew
- Faulkner
- Franklin
- Fulton
- Garland
- Grant
- Greene
- Hempstead
- Hot Spring
- Howard
- Independence
- Izard
- Jackson
- Jefferson
- Johnson
- Lafayette
- Lawrence
- Lee
- Lincoln
- Little River
- Logan
- Lonoke
- Madison
- Marion
- Miller
- Mississippi
- Monroe
- Montgomery
- Nevada
- Newton
- Ouachita
- Perry
- Phillips
- Pike
- Poinsett
- Polk
- Pope
- Prairie
- Pulaski (Little Rock)
- Randolph
- St. Francis
- Saline
- Scott
- Searcy
- Sebastian
- Sevier
- Sharp
- Stone
- Union
- Van Buren
- Washington
- White
- Woodruff
- Yell

This National Park Service list is complete through NPS recent listings posted December 19, 2025.

== Current listings ==
	Name on the Register	Image	Date listed	Location	City or town	Description
1	Anderson-Hobson Mercantile Store	Anderson-Hobson Mercantile Store	June 20, 1996 (#96000642)	201 Schuman St. 33°43′19″N 94°23′49″W	Foreman	
2	Ashdown Commercial Historic District	Ashdown Commercial Historic District	May 20, 2008 (#08000439)	Roughly bounded by Keller, E. Main Commerce, and N. Constitution Sts. 33°40′27″N 94°07′52″W	Ashdown	
3	Judge Jefferson Thomas Cowling House	Judge Jefferson Thomas Cowling House	December 8, 1988 (#88002823)	611 Willow St. 33°40′44″N 94°07′44″W	Ashdown	
4	Hawkins House	Hawkins House	June 20, 1996 (#96000641)	Northwestern corner of the junction of 3rd Ave. and 3rd St. 33°43′24″N 94°24′03″W	Foreman	
5	Hunter-Coulter House	Hunter-Coulter House	June 20, 1996 (#96000633)	Northwestern corner of the junction of 2nd and Commerce Sts. 33°40′21″N 94°07′56″W	Ashdown	
6	Little River County Courthouse	Little River County Courthouse	September 29, 1976 (#76000427)	Main and 2nd Sts. 33°40′20″N 94°07′58″W	Ashdown	1907 neoclassical-style courthouse
7	Little River County Training School Historic District	Little River County Training School Historic District	January 26, 2016 (#15000994)	100 W. Hamilton St. 33°40′07″N 94°07′59″W	Ashdown	
8	Memphis, Paris and Gulf Railroad Depot	Memphis, Paris and Gulf Railroad Depot	March 17, 1994 (#94000192)	Northern corner of the junction of Whitaker Ave. and Frisco St. 33°40′26″N 94°07′42″W	Ashdown	
9	Mills Cemetery	Mills Cemetery	September 27, 2007 (#07000992)	County Road 40, approximately 1/8-mile west of U.S. Route 71, N. 33°46′22″N 94°09′05″W	Wilton	
10	New Rocky Comfort Jail	New Rocky Comfort Jail	December 9, 1994 (#94001465)	Southeastern corner of the junction of 3rd and Schuman Sts. 33°43′22″N 94°23′46″W	Foreman	
11	Old US 71-Ashdown Segment	Old US 71-Ashdown Segment	January 29, 2013 (#12001232)	N. Park Ave. between E. Main St. & US 71; 33°40′46″N 94°07′56″W	Ashdown	
12	Old US 71-Ogden Segment	Old US 71-Ogden Segment	January 29, 2013 (#12001230)	Ogden & Grand Sts., west of US 71 & east of Kansas City Southern Railroad; 33°34′58″N 94°02′33″W	Ogden	
13	Old US 71-Wilton Segment	Old US 71-Wilton Segment	May 26, 2004 (#04000492)	East of U.S. Route 71 from Old U.S. Route 71 and the U.S. Route 71 junction north to the southern bank of the Little River; 33°46′04″N 94°08′49″W	Wilton	
14	Will Reed Farm House	Will Reed Farm House	July 14, 1978 (#78000606)	Main St. 33°46′20″N 94°15′36″W	Alleene	
15	St. Barnabas Episcopal Church	St. Barnabas Episcopal Church	July 23, 1998 (#98000910)	Junction of Tracy Lawrence Ave. and Bell St. 33°43′51″N 94°23′43″W	Foreman	
16	Texarkana and Fort Smith Railway Depot	Texarkana and Fort Smith Railway Depot	January 24, 2008 (#07001428)	Texarkana Ave. 33°44′32″N 94°08′56″W	Wilton	

== Former listing ==
	Name on the Register	Image	Date listed	Date removed	Location	City or town	Description
1	S.S.P. Mills and Son Building	S.S.P. Mills and Son Building	June 20, 1996 (#96000631)	January 27, 2014	Northwestern corner of the junction of Texarkana Ave. and Main St. 33°44′25″N 94°08′54″W	Wilton	

== See also ==
- List of National Historic Landmarks in Arkansas
- National Register of Historic Places listings in Arkansas
