= Wilton station (Arkansas) =

- Texarkana and Fort Smith Railway Depot
- U.S. National Register of Historic Places
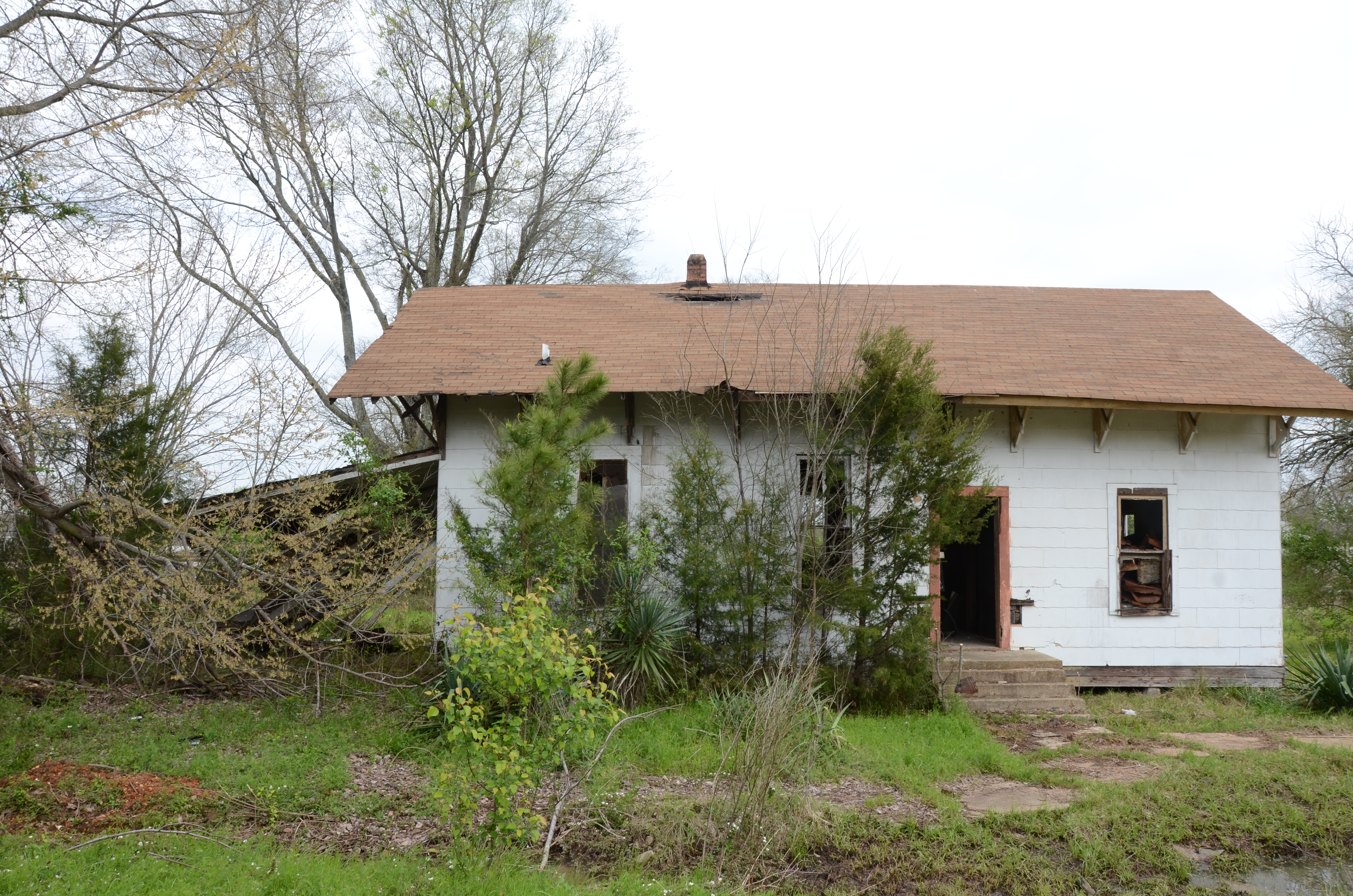

- Location within Arkansas Location within the United States
- Location: Texarkana Ave., Wilton, Arkansas
- Coordinates: 33°44′32″N 94°8′56″W
- Area: less than one acre
- Built: 1891
- Built by: Texarkana and Fort Smith Railway
- Architectural style: Stick/eastlake, Plain-Traditional
- MPS: Historic Railroad Depots of Arkansas MPS
- NRHP reference No.: 07001428
- Added to NRHP: January 24, 2008

The Texarkana and Fort Smith Railway Depot is a historic railroad station on Texarkana Avenue in Wilton, Arkansas. Built c. 1893, this single-story wood-frame structure is the only surviving station built by the Texarkana and Fort Smith Railway, which only existed as an independent entity from 1885 to 1892. It was originally located closer to the tracks, housing facilities for both passengers and freight, but was moved about 400 feet (120 m) after its sale into private hands. The building has architecturally distinctive Stick-style bracing in its eaves.

The building was listed on the National Register of Historic Places in 2008.

== See also ==
- National Register of Historic Places listings in Little River County, Arkansas

Preceding station	Kansas City Southern Railway	Following station
Alleene toward Kansas City	Main Line	Ashdown toward Port Arthur
