= Mills Cemetery =

Historic cemetery in Arkansas, United States

- U.S. National Register of Historic Places
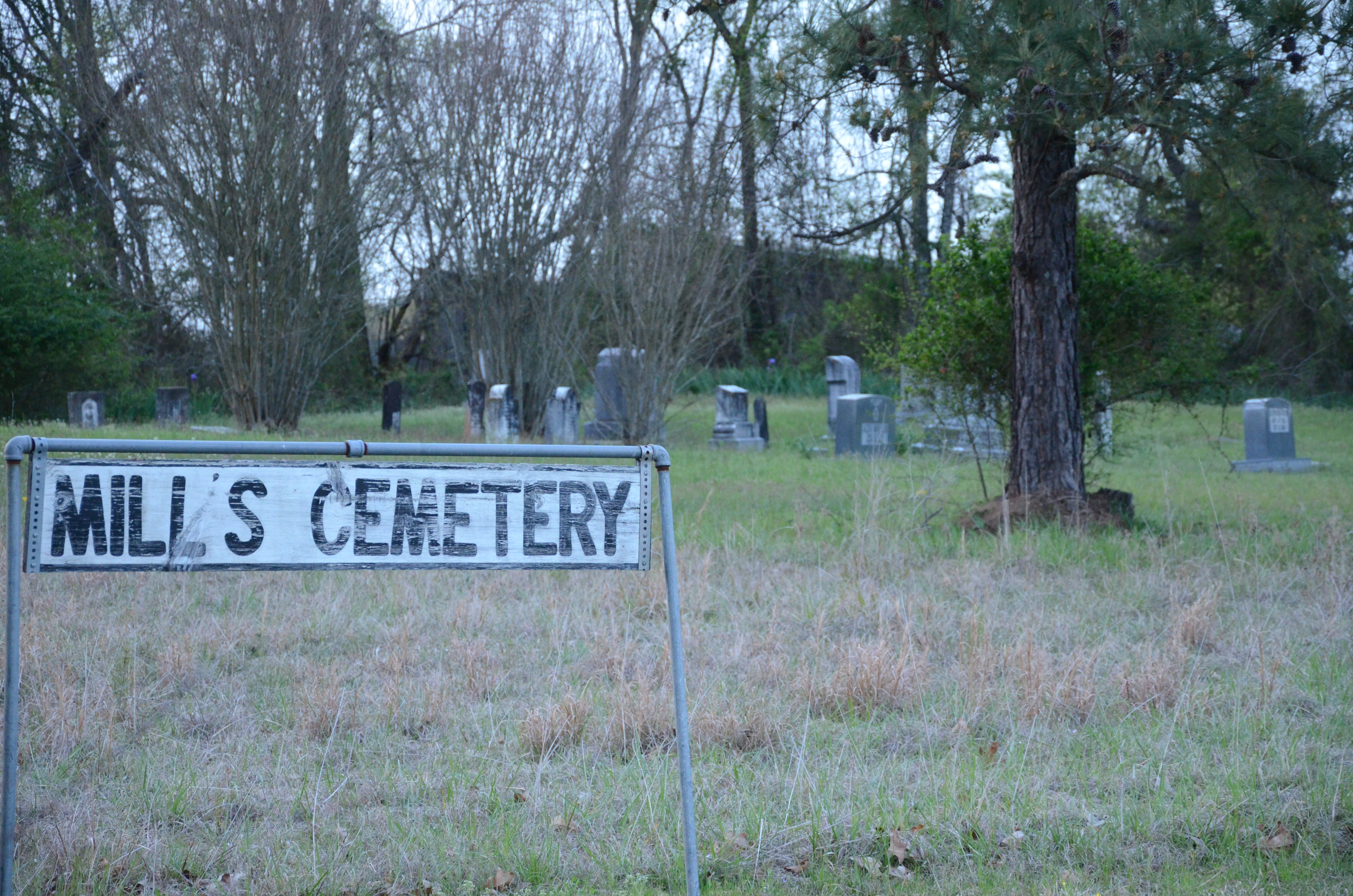

- Location within Arkansas Location within the United States
- Nearest city: Wilton, Arkansas
- Coordinates: 33°46′22″N 94°9′5″W
- Area: 3.5 acres (1.4 ha)
- Built: 1855
- NRHP reference No.: 07000992
- Added to NRHP: September 27, 2007

Mills Cemetery is a small historic cemetery in rural Little River County, Arkansas. It is a 3.5-acre (1.4 ha) parcel of land on the north side of County Road 40, about 1/8 mile west of its junction with United States Route 71, about 2 miles (3.2 km) north of Wilton, Arkansas. It is one of the oldest cemeteries in the county, holding the graves of members of the Mills family, who first explored the Little River County area in the 1850s. The oldest of the 39 known graves dates to the 1850s; one of the most prominent burials is Joel Mills (1808–71), who was a major plantation owner.

The cemetery was listed on the National Register of Historic Places in 2007.

== See also ==
- National Register of Historic Places listings in Little River County, Arkansas
