= Ashdown Commercial Historic District =

Historic district in Arkansas, United States

- U.S. National Register of Historic Places
- U.S. Historic district
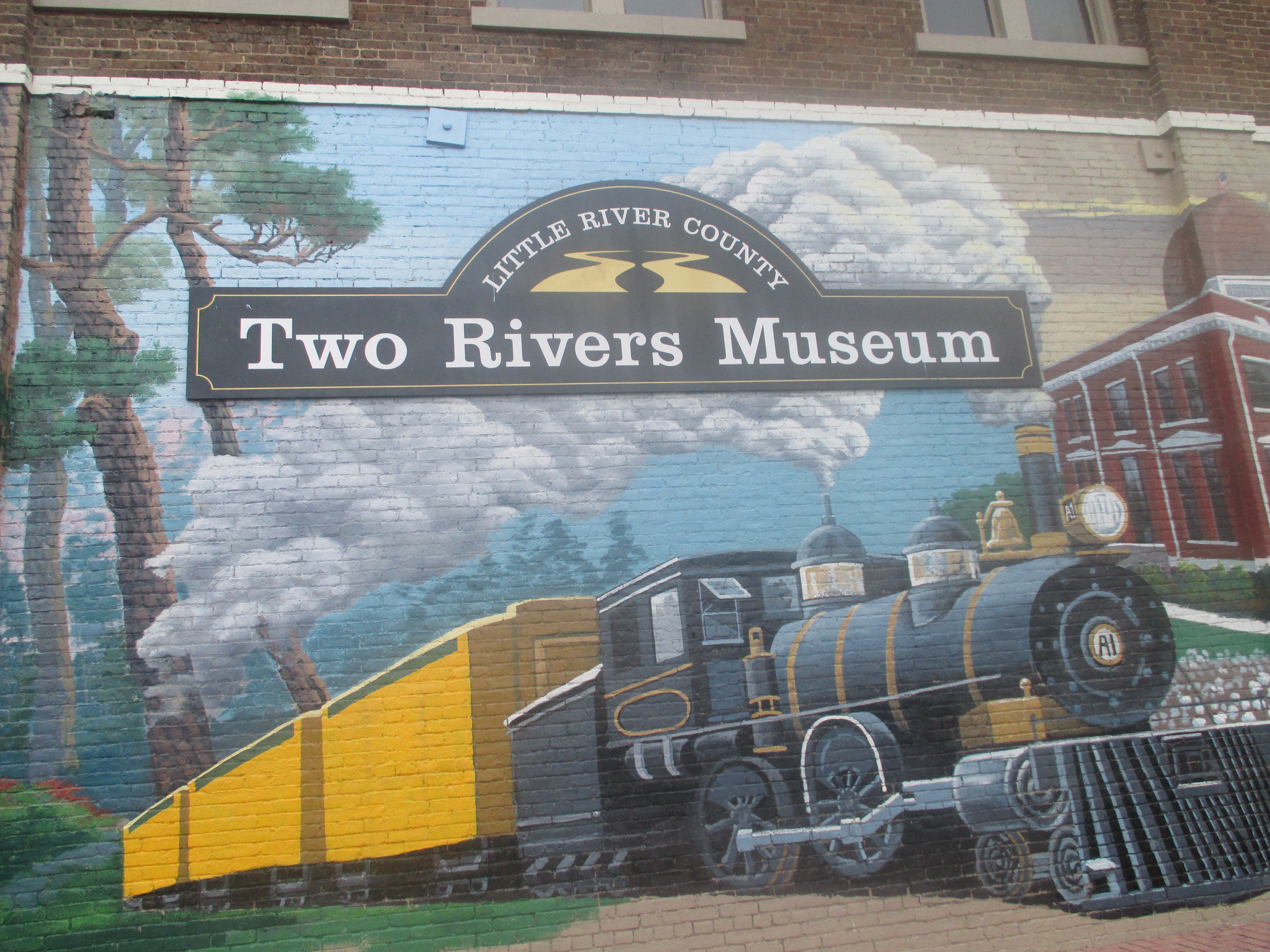
- Entrance to the Two Rivers Museum, 15 E. Main Street

- Location within Arkansas Location within the United States
- Location: Roughly bounded by Keller, E. Main Commerce & N. Constitution Sts., Ashdown, Arkansas
- Coordinates: 33°40′27″N 94°7′52″W
- Area: 4.9 acres (2.0 ha)
- Built: 1905
- Architectural style: Early Commercial, Art Deco
- NRHP reference No.: 08000439
- Added to NRHP: May 20, 2008

The Ashdown Commercial Historic District encompasses part of the historic commercial heart of Ashdown, the county seat of Little River County, Arkansas. This area was developed primarily between 1905 and 1945, and represents the city's growth during that time as a cotton and lumber center. It covers a roughly two-block area bounded on the west by an alley west of East Main Street, on the north by Keller Street, on the east by Whitaker Street, and on the south by North Constitution Street (United States Route 59). Prominent early buildings in the district include the R. M. Price Building (46 E. Main Street), a large two-story brick building built 1905, the 1915 Dixie Theater, and the 1905 Little River News building at 45A E. Main Street. Stylistically distinctive is the 1947 Williams Theater at 360 Keller Street, which is the only Art Deco building in the area.

The district was listed on the National Register of Historic Places in 2008.

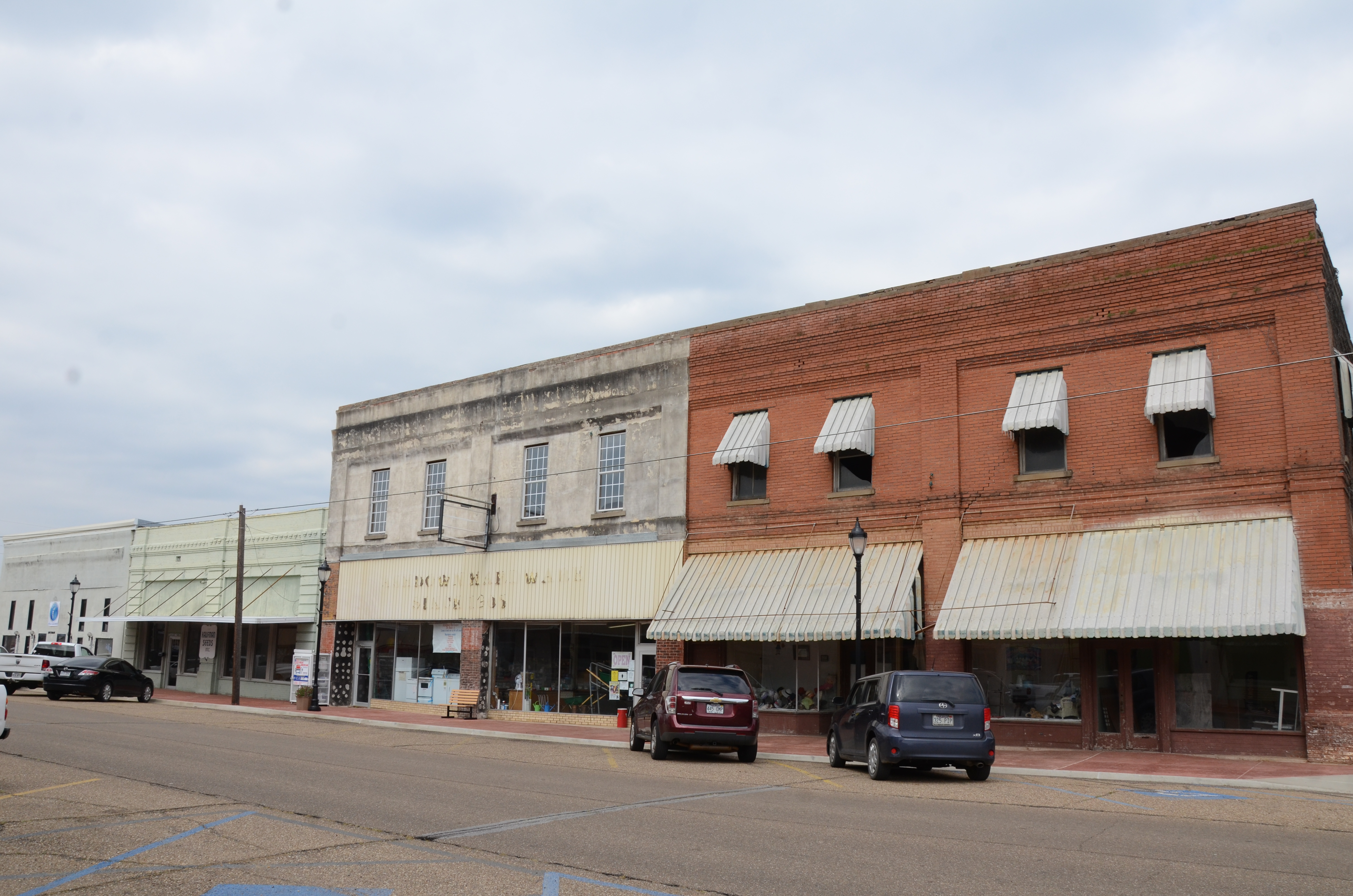
2016

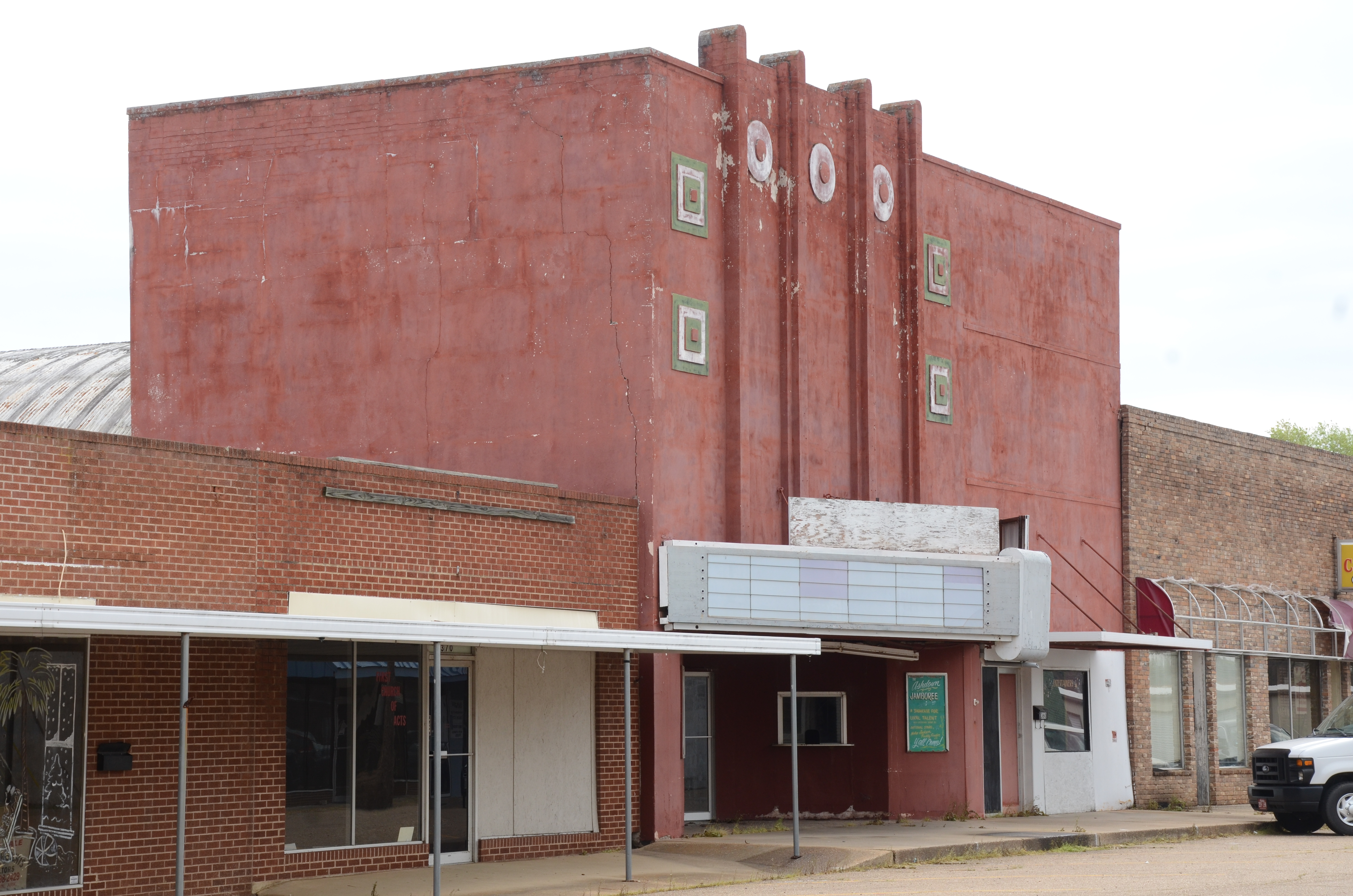
2016

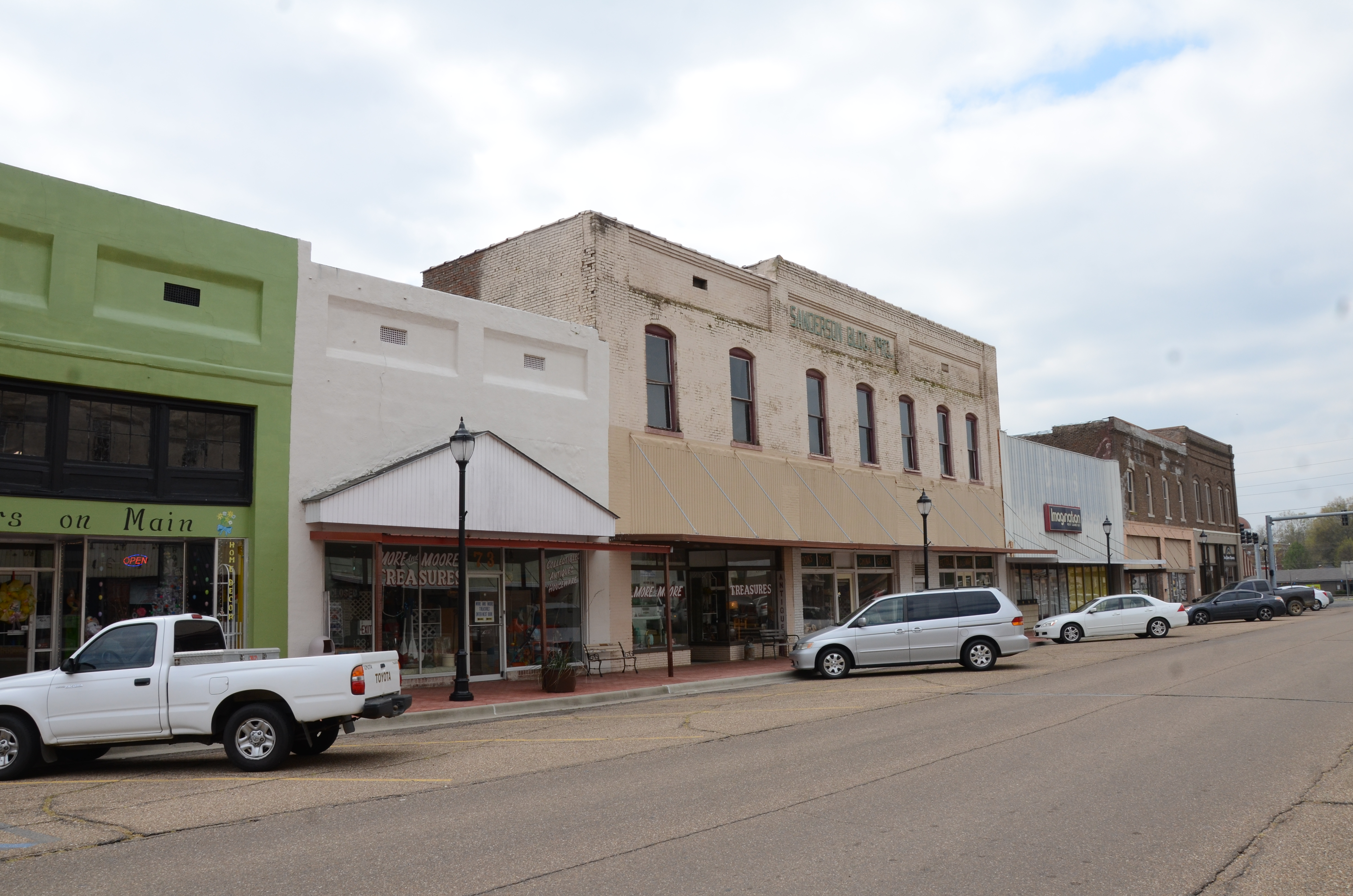
2016

== See also ==
- National Register of Historic Places listings in Little River County, Arkansas
