= St. Barnabas Episcopal Church (Foreman, Arkansas) =

Historic church in Arkansas, United States

- U.S. National Register of Historic Places
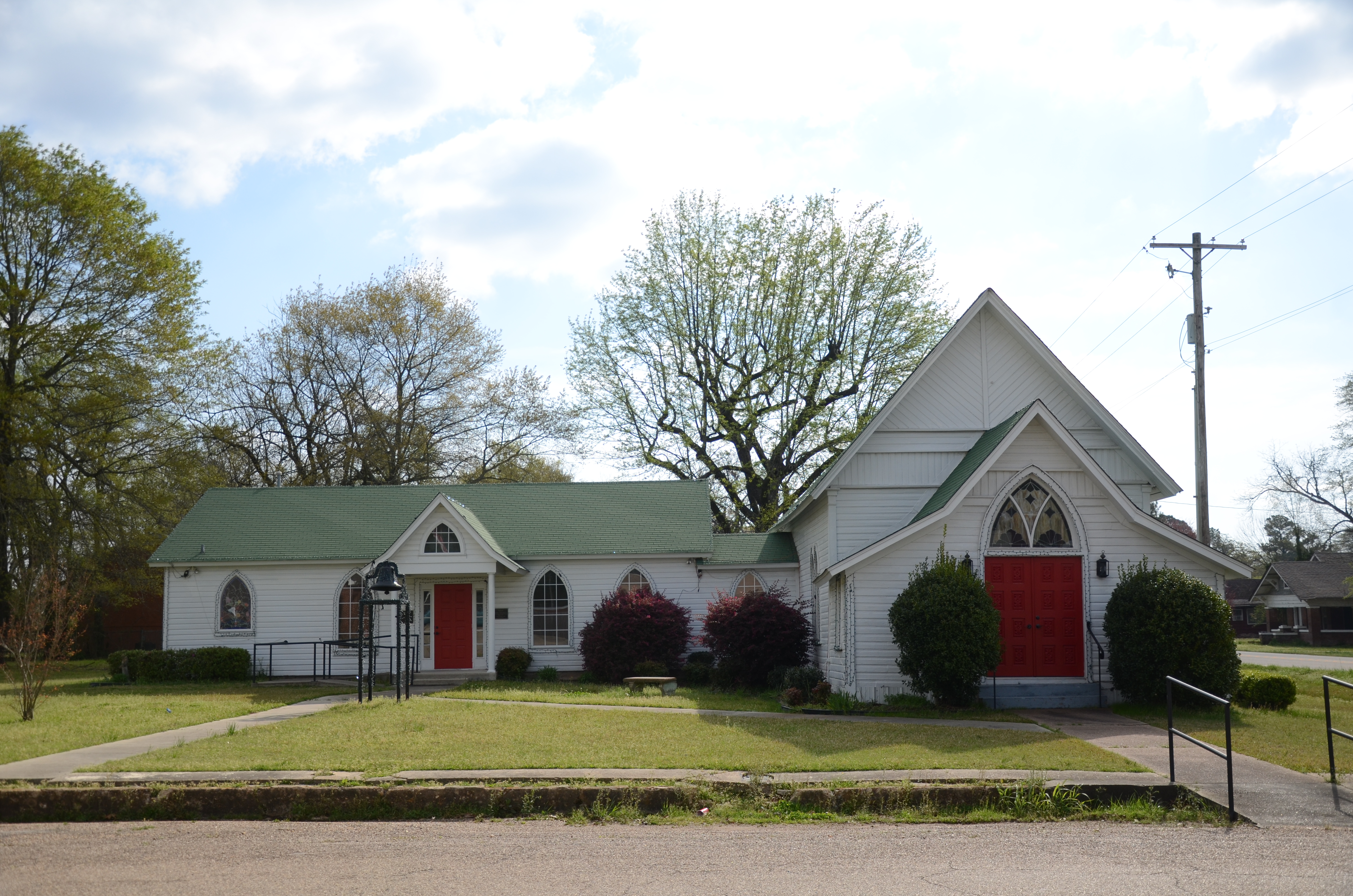

- Location within Arkansas Location within the United States
- Location: Jct. of Tracy Lawrence Ave. and Bell St., Foreman, Arkansas
- Coordinates: 33°43′51″N 94°23′43″W
- Area: less than one acre
- Built: 1895
- Architect: A. M. Hawkins
- Architectural style: Gothic
- NRHP reference No.: 98000910
- Added to NRHP: July 23, 1998

St. Barnabas Episcopal Church is a historic church at the junction of Tracy Lawrence Avenue and Bell Street in Foreman, Arkansas.

In 2017, the church reported 43 members; in 2023, it reported 20 members. No membership statistics were reported in 2024 national parochial reports. Plate and pledge financial support reported by the church in 2024 was $0. Average Sunday Attendance (ASA) reported between 2015 and 2023 was 15 persons.

== Building ==
The church is a single-story wood-frame structure, designed by A. M. Hawkins and built in 1895 for a congregation whose origins lay in a mission established in the 1840s. The church has Gothic, Queen Anne and Stick style elements, including decorative cut shingles, stickwork in the gables, and Gothic lancet windows. In the 1950s an old one-room schoolhouse was attached to the church to serve as a parish hall; this was destroyed in a storm in 1993, replaced by new construction in 1996. The church was listed on the National Register of Historic Places in 1998.

== Stained glass windows ==
A prominent feature of the church building is its stained glass windows examples of which can be seen below.

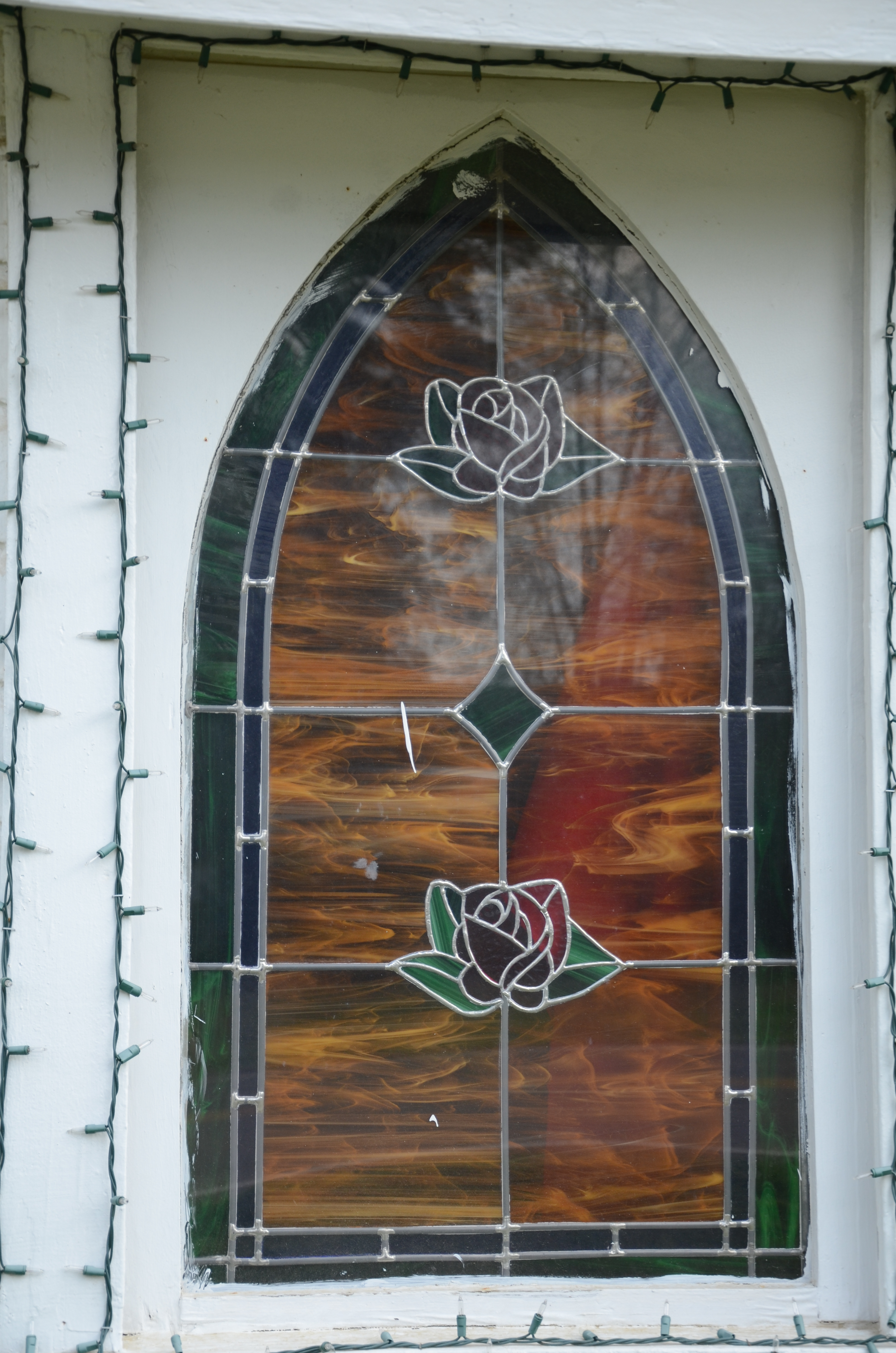
Orange glass with double rose motif

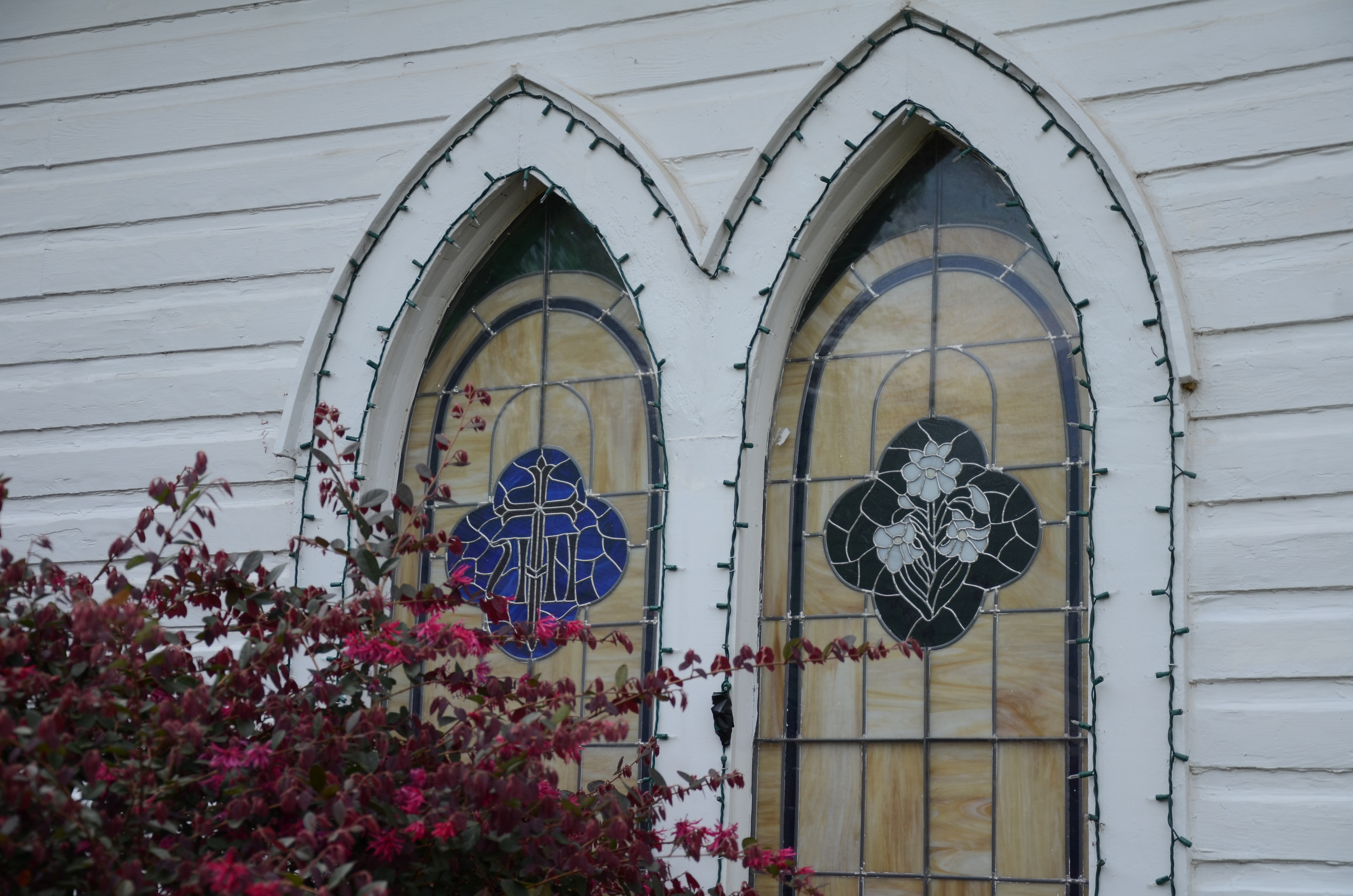
Double arch windows

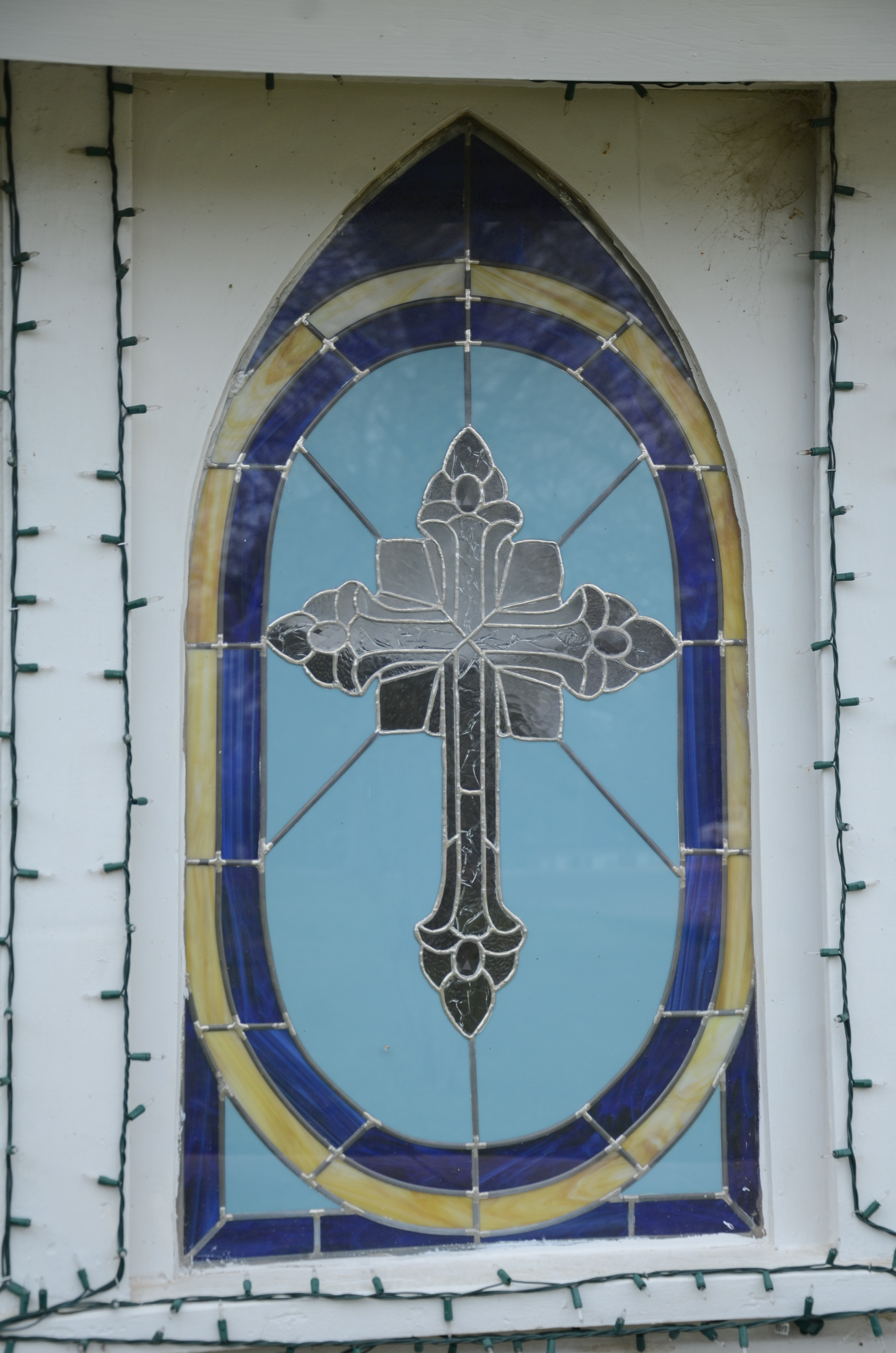
Two-toned blue glass with decorative cross

== See also ==
- Episcopal Diocese of Arkansas
- National Register of Historic Places listings in Little River County, Arkansas
