= Ashdown School District =

School district in Arkansas

Location
- 511 North Second Street; Ashdown, Arkansas 71822 United States

District information
- Grades: K–12
- Established: 1903
- Superintendent: Casey Nichols
- Accreditation: AdvancED
- Schools: 5
- NCES District ID: 0502580

Students and staff
- Students: 1,509
- Teachers: 127.02 (on FTE basis)
- Student–teacher ratio: 11.88
- District mascot: Panther
- Colors: Purple Gold

Other information
- Website: www.ashdownschools.org

Ashdown School District is a public school district based in Ashdown, Arkansas, United States. The Ashdown School District provides early childhood, elementary and secondary education for more than 1,500 kindergarten through grade 12 students at its five facilities.

Ashdown School District is accredited by the Arkansas Department of Education (ADE) and AdvancED.

== History ==
The first school building for white children was built in 1903, though classes had been meeting since 1891 in a building owned by Alex Bishop. In 1914, the existing school building was moved from Burke Street to Park Avenue to provide space for a new brick school building, built in 1915 by Henry Westbrook. It was torn down in 1964 to erect the present L. F. Henderson Intermediate School on Burke Street. In 1954, a new brick high school was built. It has now been replaced by a modern seven-million-dollar facility constructed around the Rankin Street School.

The first school for black children was built in 1899. Eventually, the Rosenwald School was built. In the 1940s, the Ashdown School District consolidated the Rosenwald School, and it became part of Ashdown School District 31. The Rosenwald School became the Little River Training School, and N. M. Brown became its new principal, serving for thirty-eight years. After the building burned, the Ashdown School District rebuilt the school and called it N. M. Brown Elementary School. This school burned in 1979, and the district built another school on the east end of Ashdown and called it Ashdown Junior High School. After the integration of black and white students, all high school students attended the high school on Rankin Street.

In spring 2007 the Rankin Street school closed to make way for a state-of-the-art facility located on the same campus but facing Locust Street. The 2007-08 school year began in the new location. With this 8 million dollar expansion, freshmen were brought over from the junior high school to join the Ashdown High School student body.

== Schools ==
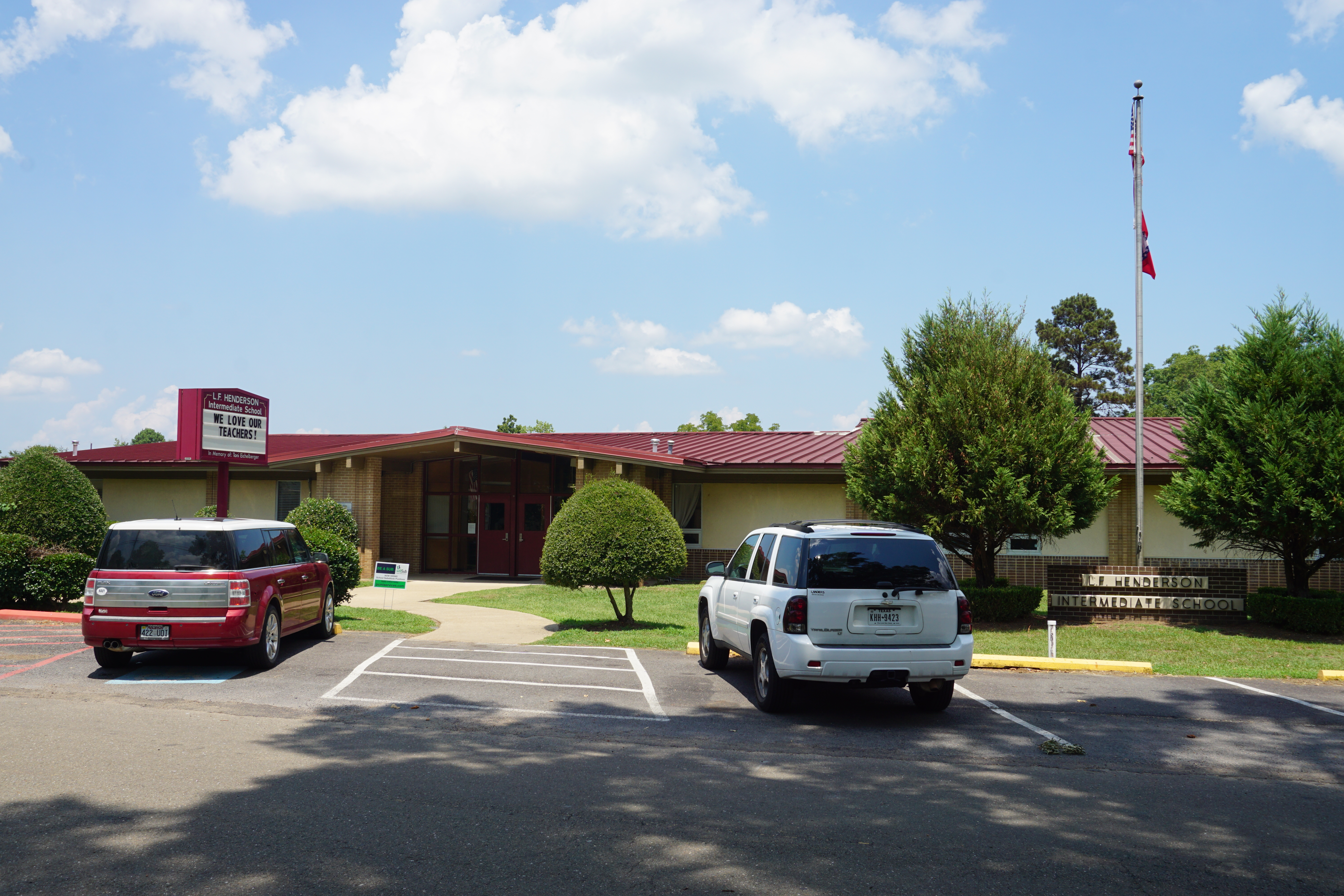
L. F. Henderson Intermediate School

- Ashdown High School—grades 9 through 12.
- Ashdown Junior High School—grades 6 through 8.
- L. F. Henderson Intermediate School—grades 4 through 5.
- C. D. Franks Elementary School—grades 2 through 3.
- Margaret Daniels Primary School—kindergarten through grade 1.
