= New Rocky Comfort Jail =

- U.S. National Register of Historic Places
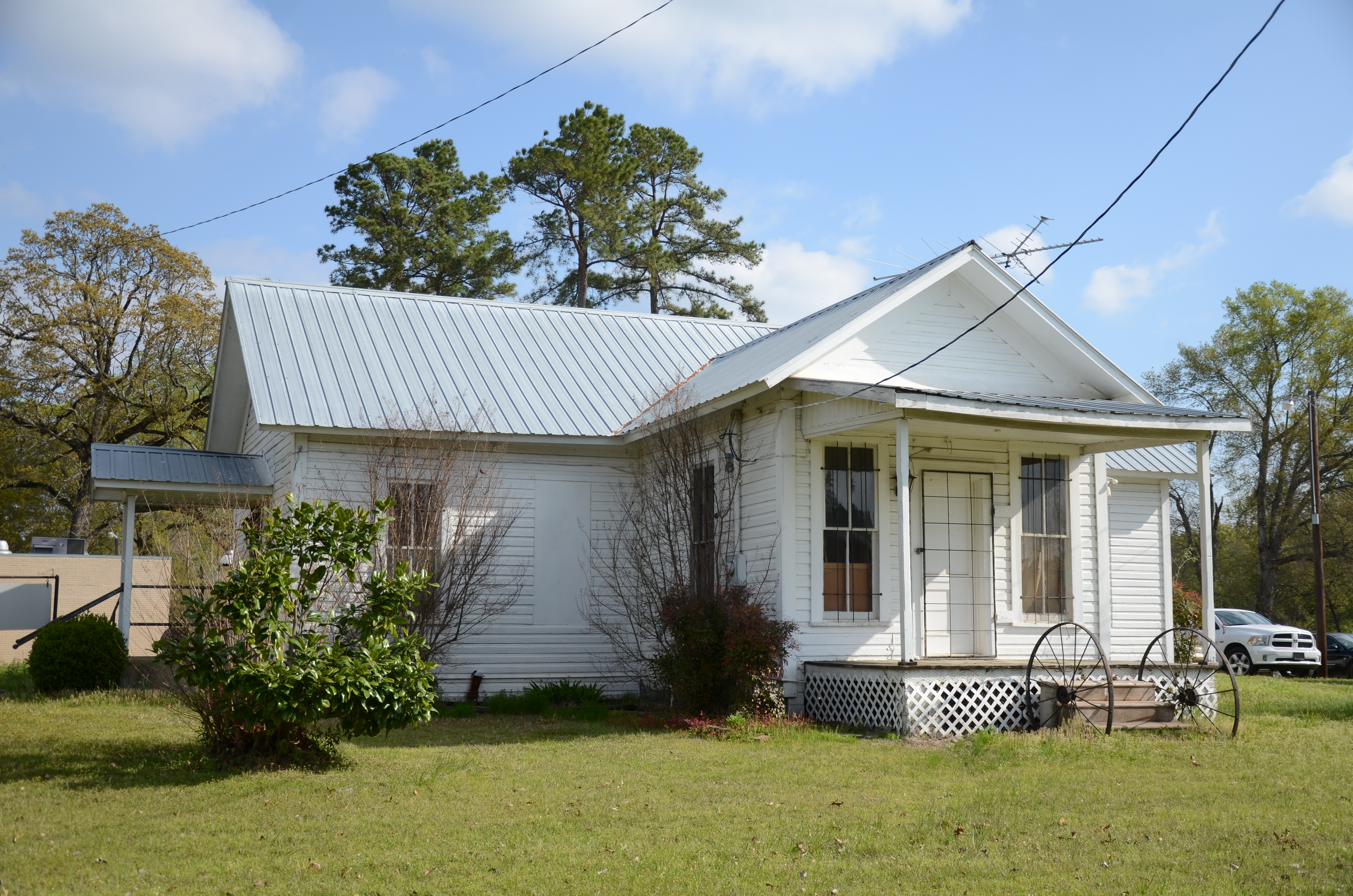

- Location within Arkansas Location within the United States
- Location: Jct. of Third and Schuman Sts., SE corner, Foreman, Arkansas
- Coordinates: 33°43′22″N 94°23′46″W
- Area: less than one acre
- Architect: Hopson, Bun
- NRHP reference No.: 94001465
- Added to NRHP: December 9, 1994

The New Rocky Comfort Jail is a historic jail, located at the southeast corner of 3rd and Schuman Streets in Foreman, Arkansas. It is a single story wooden structure, resting on concrete block piers and topped by a metal gable roof. Its walls are constructed out of stacked two-by-six pine, and its floor and ceiling are out of similar material, laid on edge. The main rectangular block was built in 1902, and an entry vestibule (framed more conventionally) was added to the south side sometime before 1928. The floor was later covered with a conventional pine floor, and part of the interior was partitioned for an office and bathroom. The building, which has served variously as a jail, city hall, meeting hall, library, and dance hall, now houses the New Rocky Comfort Museum.

The building was listed on the National Register of Historic Places in 1994.

== See also ==
- National Register of Historic Places listings in Little River County, Arkansas
