= Beard's Bluff =

Coordinates: 33°42′15″N 93°56′21″W

Beard's Bluff is campground park in Arkansas managed by the U.S. Army Corps of Engineers on Millwood Lake, near Ashdown, Arkansas. Recreation available includes hiking along the beach, fishing, camping, picnicking and boating. The park has a wedding chapel.

The park had a swimming beach for many years, but it closed in 2009 for repairs due to flooding.

Artifacts discovered on and around Beard's Bluff show that many American Indian peoples, including those of the Calf Creek Culture, have lived on the land prior to the park over thousands of years.
