= Ashdown High School =

Location
- 171 Locust Street; Ashdown, Arkansas 71822; United States
- 35°54′27″N 90°34′38″W

Information
- School type: Millage Tax, Public comprehensive
- Motto: Attitude + Hard work = Success (AHS)
- Established: 1915 (111 years ago)
- Status: Open
- School district: Ashdown School District
- Authority: Ashdown Public School Board
- Superintendent: Jason Sanders
- CEEB code: 040060
- NCES School ID: 050258000028
- Principal: Kay York
- Teaching staff: 44.89 (on FTE basis)
- Grades: 9–12
- Age range: 13-21 (Max age by Ark. law)
- Enrollment: 396 (2023-2024)
- Average class size: 20
- Student to teacher ratio: 8.82
- Education system: ADE Smart Core
- Classes offered: Regular, Advanced Placement (AP) Concurrent Enrollment agreement with Cossotot Community College of the University of Arkansas
- Colors: Purple and gold
- Fight song: On Wisconsin
- Athletics: Football, Volleyball, Golf, Basketball, Wrestling, Baseball, Softball, Track, Cheer
- Athletics conference: 7-4A
- Mascot: Panther
- Team name: Ashdown Panthers
- Accreditation: ADE
- Yearbook: Panther Eyes
- Feeder schools: Ashdown Junior High School (6–8)
- Website: www.ashdownschools.org/apps/pages/index.jsp?uREC_ID=1543909&type=d&pREC_ID=1657076

Ashdown High School is a comprehensive public high school located in the town of Ashdown, Arkansas, United States. The school provides secondary education for students in grades 9 through 12. It is one of two public high schools in Little River County, Arkansas and the sole high school administered by the Ashdown School District.

== Academics ==
Ashdown High School is accredited by the Arkansas Department of Education (ADE) and has been accredited by AdvancED since 1929. The assumed course of study follows the Common Core curriculum developed by the ADE. Students complete regular (core and elective) and career focus coursework and exams and may take Advanced Placement (AP) courses and exams with the opportunity to receive college credit.

== Athletics ==
The Ashdown High School mascot and athletic emblem is the panther with purple and gold serving as the school colors.

The Ashdown Panthers compete in interscholastic activities within the 4A Classification via the 4A Region 7 Conference, as administered by the Arkansas Activities Association. Ashdown Panthers won the 3A state championship during the 2018-19 Basketball season. The Panthers field teams in football, golf, basketball, cheer, baseball, softball, and track and field.
