= Calf Creek culture =

Nomadic hunter-gatherer people of North America

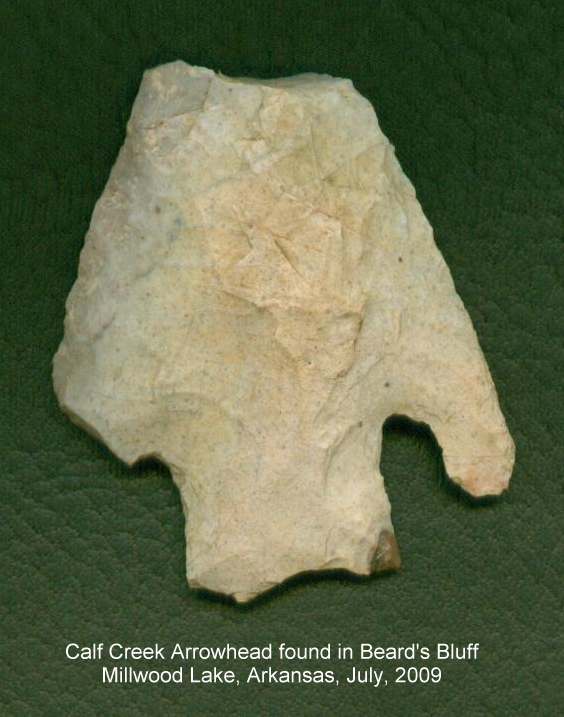

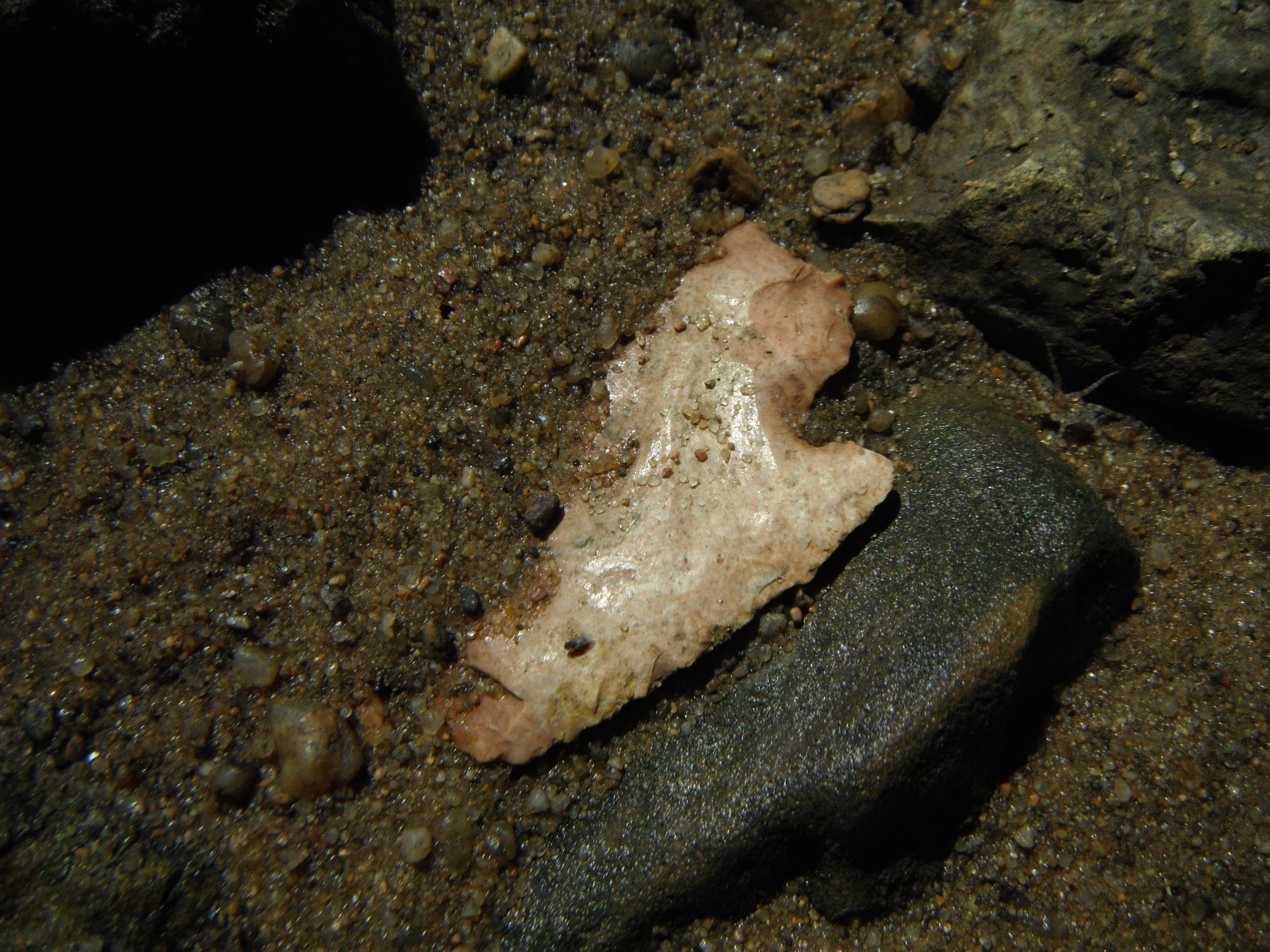
Calf Creek Insitu Sand Springs Tulsa

Calf Creek Culture was a nomadic hunter-gatherer people who lived in the southcentral region of North America, especially in the area of what is today Oklahoma and surrounding states, artifacts having been found in such places as Beard's Bluff, Arkansas and Sand Springs, Oklahoma. The Calf Creek culture was active during the early to middle Archaic period in the Americas, approximately 7,500 to 4,000 years ago.

The Calf Creek people were noted for their use of large, heat-treated flint spearheads. The Calf Creek point was first named and described in an Arkansas amateur archaeological journal by Don Dickson in 1968, for examples found at Calf Creek cave in Searcy County Arkansas. The cave was named for a small, perennial stream that runs nearby.

In 2003, a 5,120±25-year-old bison skull was found on the banks of the Arkansas River by Kim Holt. This find was featured on the PBS show, History Detectives. The skull had a Calf Creek culture spearhead embedded just over the orbital of the right eye socket. The size of the spearhead, and the wound it inflicted further suggest that the Calf Creek also used atlatls.
