= Hunter-Coulter House =

Historic house in Arkansas, United States

- U.S. National Register of Historic Places
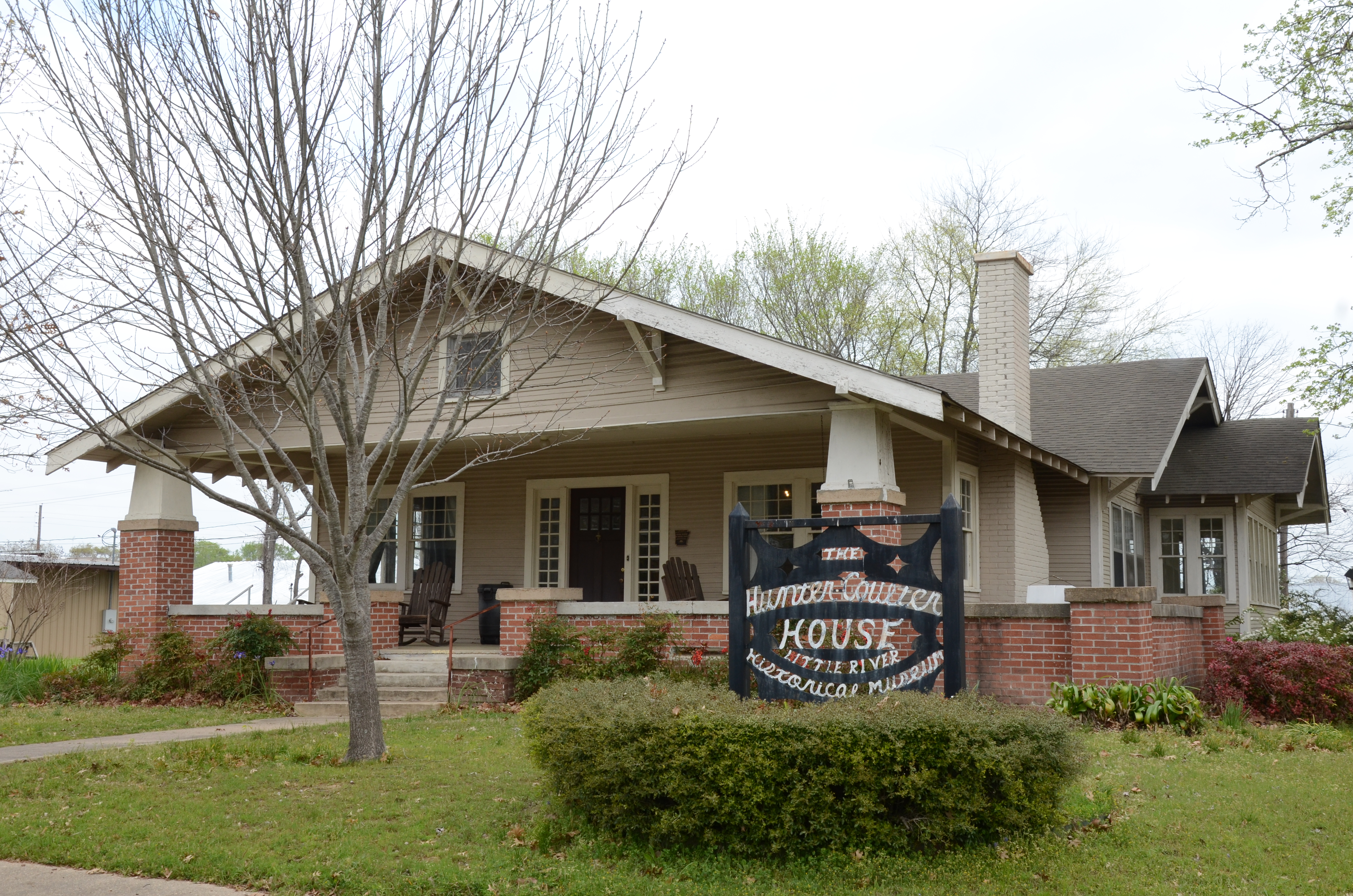

- Location within Arkansas Location within the United States
- Location: Jct. of 2nd and Commerce Sts., NW corner, Ashdown, Arkansas
- Coordinates: 33°40′21″N 94°7′56″W
- Area: less than one acre
- Built: 1918
- Built by: Henry Westbrook
- Architectural style: Bungalow/American craftsman
- MPS: Railroad Era Resources of Southwest Arkansas MPS
- NRHP reference No.: 96000633
- Added to NRHP: June 20, 1996

The Hunter-Coulter House is a historic house at the northern corner of 2nd and Commerce Streets in Ashdown, Arkansas. It is a single-story wood-frame structure, with a gable roof, which extends over a full-width front porch supported by heavy wooden columns on brick piers. The house is an example of American craftsman architecture, with exposed rafters and large knee brackets visible. The house was built in 1918 for William Grant Hunter, during the building boom that followed the railroad's arrival in Ashdown. It is one of the few residences in the county to survive from that period.

The house was listed on the National Register of Historic Places in 1996.

== See also ==
- National Register of Historic Places listings in Little River County, Arkansas
