= Hawkins House (Foreman, Arkansas) =

Historic house in Arkansas, United States

- U.S. National Register of Historic Places
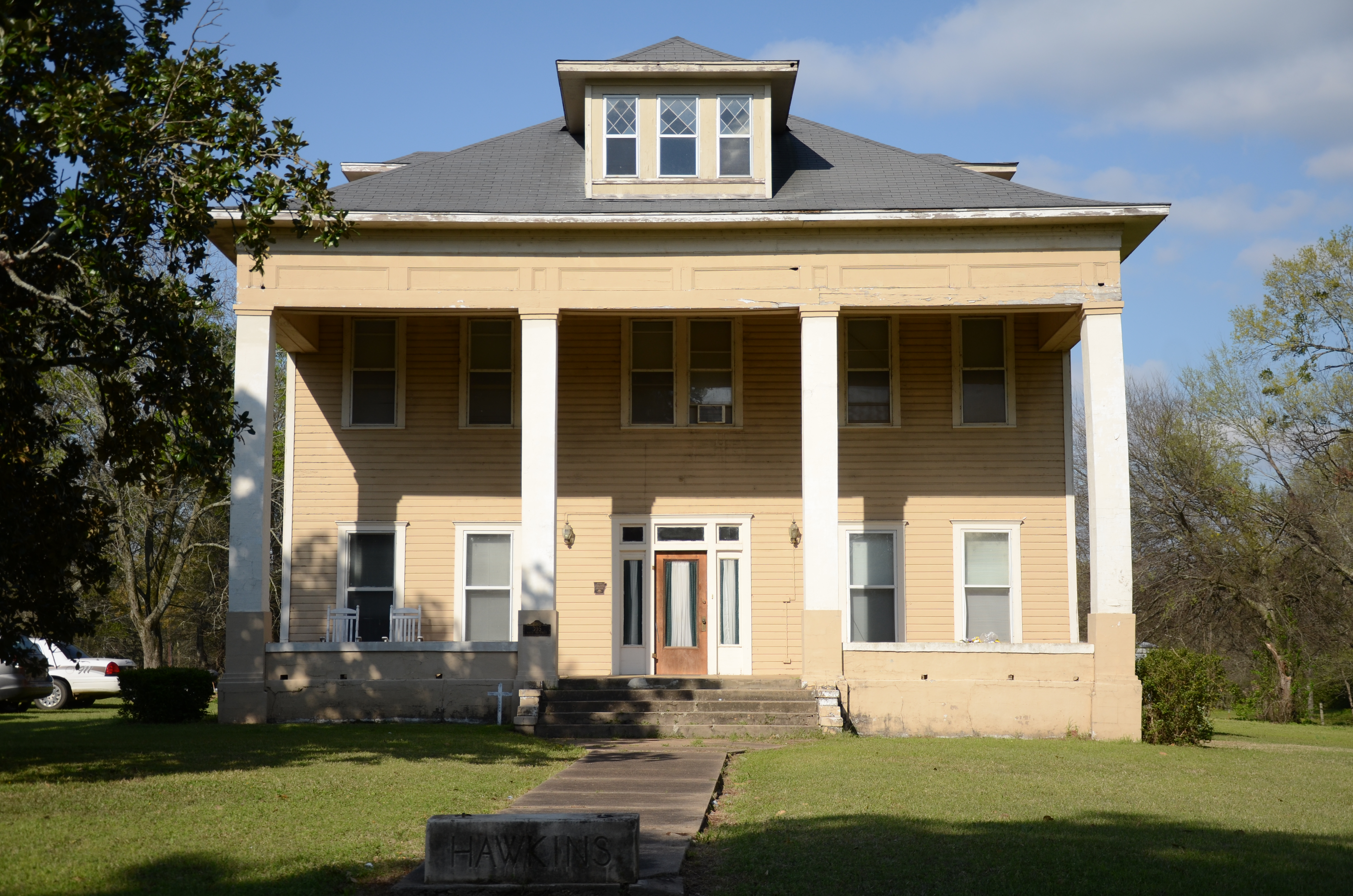

- Location within Arkansas Location within the United States
- Location: Jct. of 3rd Ave. and 3rd St., NW corner, Foreman, Arkansas
- Coordinates: 33°43′24″N 94°24′3″W
- Area: less than one acre
- Built: 1912
- Architectural style: American foursquare
- MPS: Railroad Era Resources of Southwest Arkansas MPS
- NRHP reference No.: 96000641
- Added to NRHP: June 20, 1996

The Hawkins House is a historic house at the northwest corner of 3rd Avenue and 3rd Street in Foreman, Arkansas. It is a 2 1/2-story wood-frame structure, built in 1912, and is one of the city's few surviving properties from its boom period in the early 20th century, dating to the arrival of the railroad. It is a vernacular Foursquare house, given an L shape by the attachment of a hip-roofed ell to its northwestern corner. Its front elevation is dominated by a two-story recessed porch, supported by concrete block columns.

The house was listed on the National Register of Historic Places in 1996.

== See also ==
- National Register of Historic Places listings in Little River County, Arkansas
