= Anderson–Hobson Mercantile Store =

- U.S. National Register of Historic Places
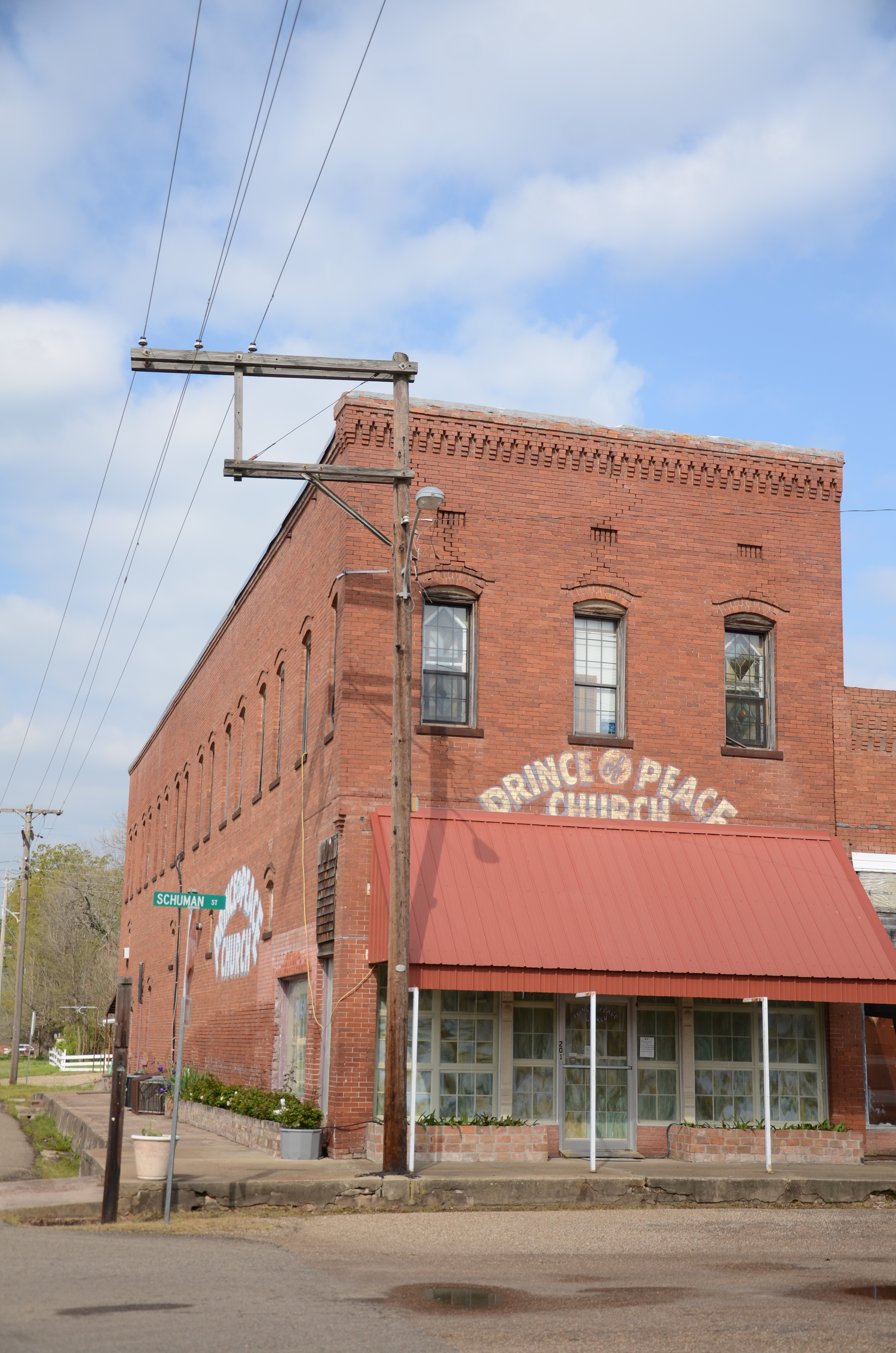

- Location within Arkansas Location within the United States
- Location: 201 Schuman St., Foreman, Arkansas
- Coordinates: 33°43′19″N 94°23′49″W
- Area: less than one acre
- Built: 1910
- Architectural style: Italianate
- MPS: Railroad Era Resources of Southwest Arkansas MPS
- NRHP reference No.: 96000642
- Added to NRHP: June 20, 1996

The Anderson–Hobson Mercantile Store is a historic commercial building at 201 Schuman Street in Foreman, Arkansas. It is a three-story brick structure with modest Italianate styling, mainly visible in brick corbelling details and segmented-arch window crowns. It was built c. 1910, as part of a major growth spurt in the county following the arrival of the railroad. It is one of the few commercial buildings in the county to survive from that period.

The building was listed on the National Register of Historic Places in 1996.

== See also ==
- National Register of Historic Places listings in Little River County, Arkansas
