= Millwood Lake =

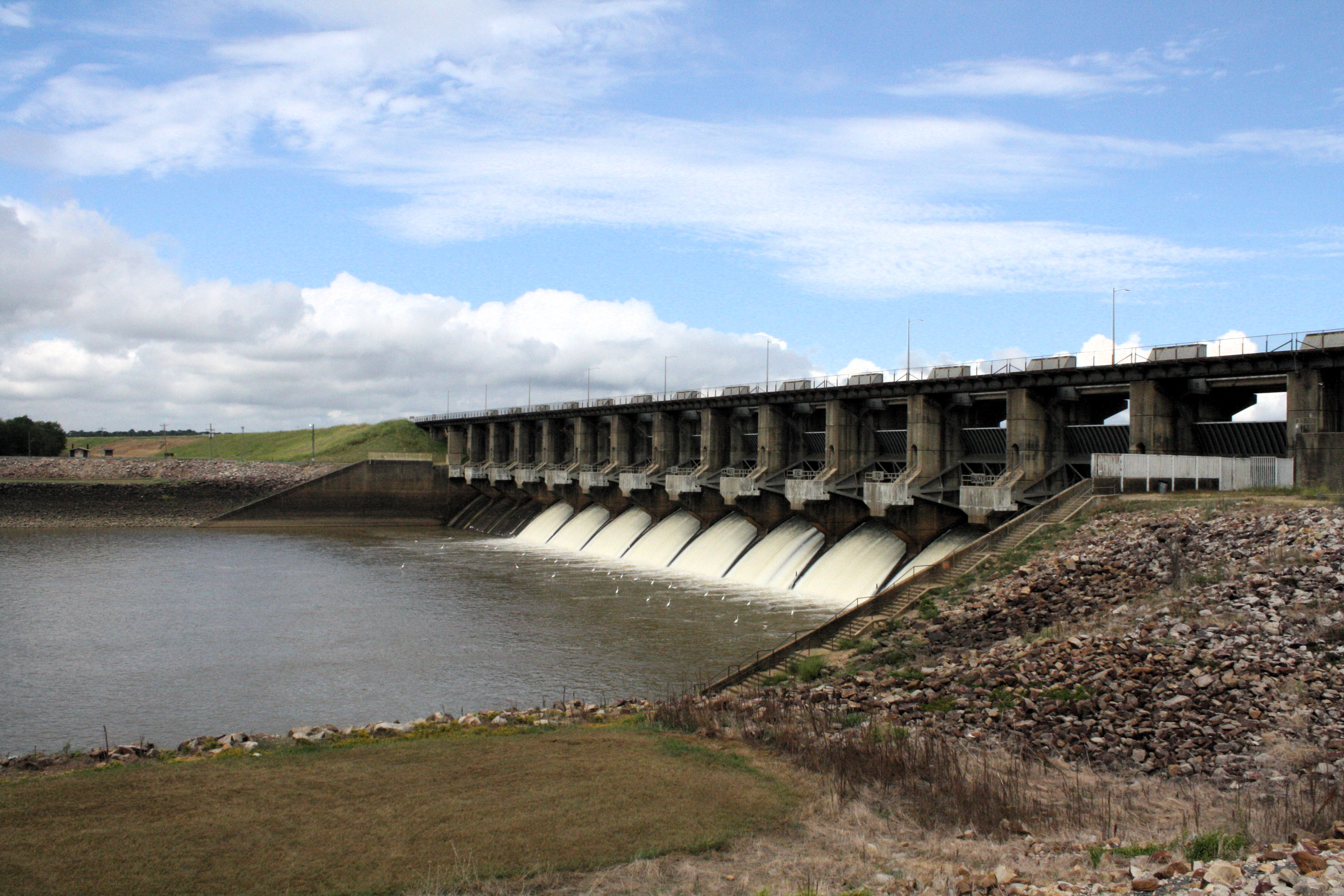
- Spillway at Millwood Dam

- Location within Arkansas
- Location: Southwestern Arkansas
- Coordinates: 33°45.83′N 94°1.23′W
- Type: Reservoir
- Catchment area: 4,144 sq mi (10,730 km^{2})
- Basin countries: United States
- Surface area: 29,200 acres (11,800 ha)
- Shore length^{1}: 65 mi (105 km)
- Surface elevation: 259.2 ft (79.0 m)
- ^{1} Shore length is not a well-defined measure.

Millwood Lake is a reservoir in southwestern Arkansas, United States. It is located 9 miles (14 km) from Ashdown and was formed from the damming of the point where Little River and Saline River meet.

== Overview ==
Millwood Lake is mainly recognized for its fishing and birding access. It is also known for housing the 1,380-pound alligator, which was caught in the lake in 2012. Its 35,000 acres (14,000 ha) of submerged timber provide homes for the many varieties of fish in the lake, including the indigenous Millwood lunker largemouth bass. Other species of fauna around the lake include white-tailed deer, bobwhite quail, squirrels, doves, rabbits, raccoons, armadillos, opossums, foxes, minks, alligators, and beavers. Boating is also popular on Millwood Lake, but only a small part of the whole surface area of the lake can be used for boating due to the submerged timber that takes up 30,000 acres (12,000 ha) of the lake. Millwood Lake also has a diverse flora life, with many plants and trees such as gum, oak, birch, pine, juniper, flowering shrubs, and wildflowers.

== History ==
The Millwood Lake project was authorized by the Flood Control Act of 1946, and modified by the Flood Control Act of 1958. The dam and lake were designed and built by the Tulsa District of the Army Corps of Engineers, which still maintains the lake's Beard's Bluff recreation center. The project's construction work began in 1961 and was finished for flood control operations in 1966 for $44,000,000. The lake and dam were dedicated on December 8, 1966. The lake is the key to the general flood reduction system for the Red River below Lake Texoma.

== See also ==
- List of Arkansas dams and reservoirs
