= Dierks Lake =

- Location within Arkansas
- Location: Howard / Sevier counties, Arkansas, United States
- Coordinates: 34.1652°N 94.0977°W
- Type: reservoir
- Primary inflows: Saline River
- Primary outflows: Saline River
- Basin countries: United States

Dierks Lake is a reservoir 56 miles (90 km) down the Saline River, and 5 mi (8 km) from Dierks, Arkansas.

== Construction ==
The Flood Control Act approved July 3, 1958 authorized Dierks Dam for construction. The project was designed by the Tulsa District of the United States Army Corps of Engineers and constructed under their supervision. Construction of the project was started in June 1968 and embankment closure was made in May 1975. The dam is an earthen structure 48 feet (15 m) high.

== Purpose ==
The purposes of Dierks Lake are: flood control on the Saline River, recreation, water supply, and fish and wildlife conservation. As a part of the Little River Basin System the lake offers a high degree of flood protection to large areas of land both in the Little River Basin and the flood plain along the Red River.

Recreation on the lake is very popular, used for boating, swimming, and skiing.

The 1,360-acre (6 km^{2}) lake is known for its bass and crappie fishing. The species most actively sought are: smallmouth bass, largemouth bass, spotted bass, crappie, channel catfish, flathead catfish, and the various species of sunfish. Most of the species found in the lake are also found in the downstream area.

Picnicking areas are available at many of the sites on Dierks Lake. There are 4 reservable picnic areas, often used for family reunions or holidays. The picnic shelters are lighted and equipped with barbecue grills and electricity. These shelters are located at Jefferson Ridge, Horseshoe Bend, and Dierks Overlook.

== See also ==
- List of Arkansas dams and reservoirs

== Sources ==
- http://webarchive.loc.gov/all/20090620214703/http://www.swl.usace.army.mil/parks/dierks/damandlake.htm
- http://webarchive.loc.gov/all/20090620214748/http://www.swl.usace.army.mil/parks/dierks/recreation.htm
