= Ashdown, Arkansas =

- City
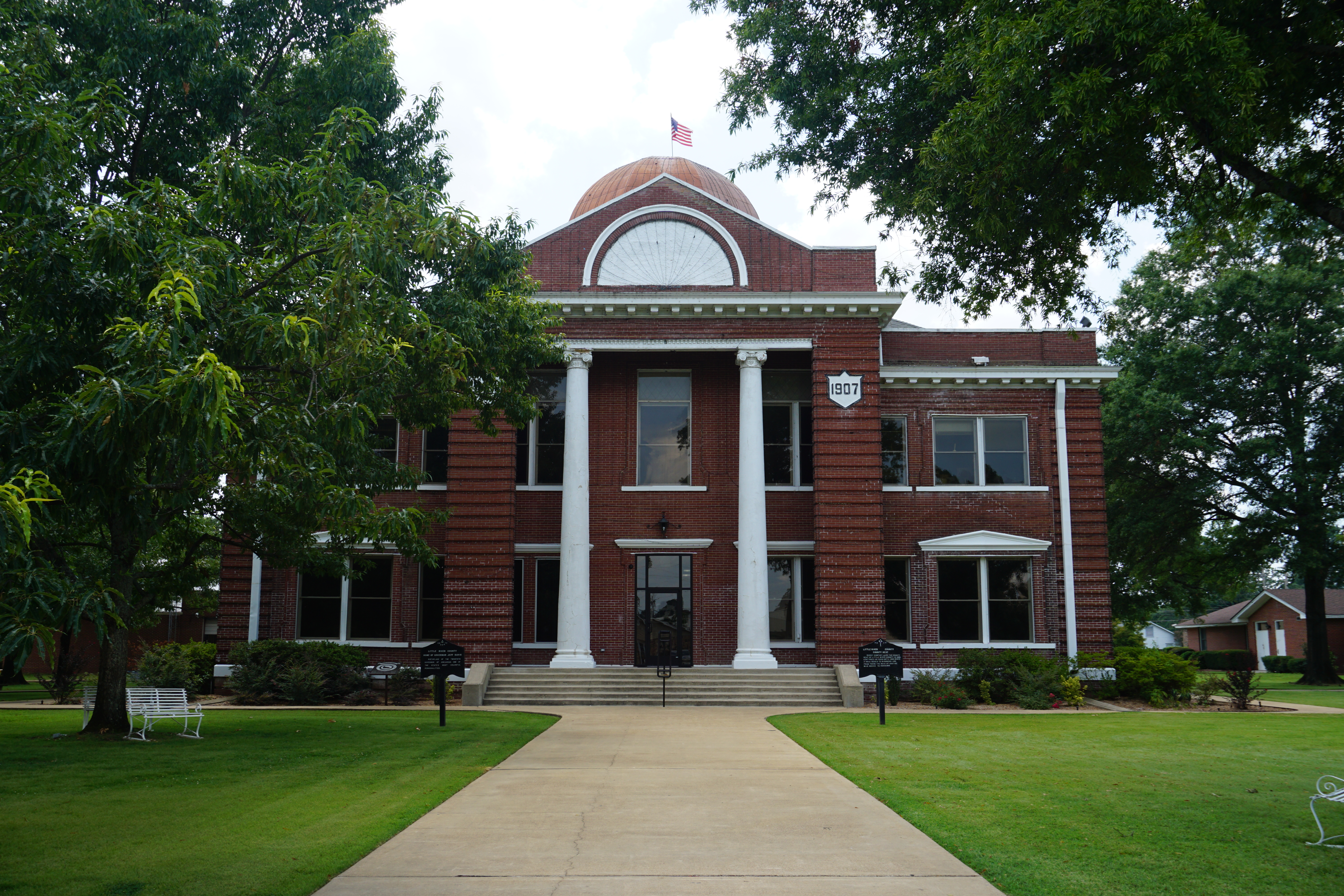
- Little River County Courthouse

- Location of Ashdown in Little River County, Arkansas.

- Location in Arkansas Location in the United States
- Coordinates: 33°40′26″N 94°07′18″W
- Country: United States
- State: Arkansas
- County: Little River
- Incorporated: June 11, 1892

Area
  - Total: 7.17 sq mi (18.56 km^{2})
  - Land: 7.14 sq mi (18.49 km^{2})
  - Water: 0.031 sq mi (0.08 km^{2})
- Elevation: 328 ft (100 m)

Population (2020)
  - Total: 4,261
  - Estimate (2025): 4,135 ▼
  - Density: 597.0/sq mi (230.51/km^{2})
- Time zone: UTC−06:00 (Central (CST))
  - Summer (DST): UTC−05:00 (CDT)
- ZIP Code: 71822
- Area code: 870
- FIPS code: 05-02380
- GNIS feature ID: 2403118
- Website: ashdownarkansas.org

Ashdown (formerly Turkey Flats and Keller) is a city in Little River County, Arkansas, United States. The community was incorporated in 1892 and has been the county seat since 1906. Located within the Arkansas Timberlands between the Little River and the Red River, Ashdown's economy and development have historically been tied to the timber industry. Timber is still a major industry here.

Ashdown's population at the 2020 census was 4,261. The city's well-preserved history and proximity to outdoor recreation, such as Millwood State Park, draws tourists.

== History ==
Founded as a small farming community, Ashdown was initially known as Turkey Flats and later Keller before being renamed by Judge Lawrence Alexander Byrne. Following his Keller mill being "burned down to ashes", Byrne vowed to rebuild and found a town named Ashdown. It was incorporated on June 11, 1892, as Ashdown. Rapid growth began in 1895 following the railroad reaching town. The Arkansas and Choctaw Railroad (later the St. Louis, San Francisco and New Orleans Railroad, and subsequently the St. Louis–San Francisco Railway) connected Ashdown to Arkinda. The growth of the Kansas City Southern Railway, and the Memphis, Dallas and Gulf Railroad (later the Graysonia, Nashville & Ashdown Railroad) continued to stimulate the city and its timber industry. The railroads could carry more freight more quickly than had the steamboats and flatboats previously used to ship lumber to markets.

Following World War II, Ashdown's economy began to diversify. Its location near two rivers attracted manufacturing plants, such as Coca-Cola bottling plant, box factory, clothing plant, ice plant and a pallet plant.

The United States Army Corps of Engineers dammed the Little River and Saline River at their confluence in 1966, forming Millwood Lake. It is used for flood control and recreation. The lake's recreational value attracted a Nekoosa Paper Company paper mill to the area two years later. It continues to operate today after being purchased by Domtar. The Little River Memorial Hospital was also built during this period of rapid building and development.

== Geography ==
According to the United States Census Bureau, the city has a total area of 7.2 square miles (19 km^{2}), of which 7.1 square miles (18.4 km^{2}) is land and 0.04 square miles (0.10 km^{2}) (0.56%) is water. Millwood Lake is located seven miles east of the town.

=== Climate ===
According to the Köppen Climate Classification system, Ashdown has a humid subtropical climate, abbreviated "Cfa" on climate maps. The hottest temperature recorded in Ashdown was 113 °F (45.0 °C) on August 4–5, 2011, while the coldest temperature recorded was −10 °F (−23.3 °C) on February 2, 1951.

Climate data for Ashdown, Arkansas, 1991–2020 normals, extremes 1893–present
Month	Jan	Feb	Mar	Apr	May	Jun	Jul	Aug	Sep	Oct	Nov	Dec	Year
Record high °F (°C)	83 (28)	85 (29)	93 (34)	97 (36)	99 (37)	107 (42)	109 (43)	113 (45)	105 (41)	99 (37)	88 (31)	82 (28)	113 (45)
Mean daily maximum °F (°C)	53.8 (12.1)	57.6 (14.2)	65.9 (18.8)	74.4 (23.6)	81.3 (27.4)	89.0 (31.7)	93.2 (34.0)	93.2 (34.0)	86.8 (30.4)	76.0 (24.4)	63.3 (17.4)	55.8 (13.2)	74.2 (23.4)
Daily mean °F (°C)	42.7 (5.9)	46.5 (8.1)	53.8 (12.1)	62.2 (16.8)	70.4 (21.3)	78.5 (25.8)	82.2 (27.9)	81.8 (27.7)	74.9 (23.8)	64.3 (17.9)	52.3 (11.3)	45.2 (7.3)	62.9 (17.2)
Mean daily minimum °F (°C)	31.7 (−0.2)	35.3 (1.8)	41.6 (5.3)	50.0 (10.0)	59.4 (15.2)	68.0 (20.0)	71.3 (21.8)	70.4 (21.3)	63.1 (17.3)	52.7 (11.5)	41.2 (5.1)	34.7 (1.5)	51.6 (10.9)
Record low °F (°C)	−6 (−21)	−10 (−23)	13 (−11)	26 (−3)	35 (2)	48 (9)	51 (11)	50 (10)	36 (2)	18 (−8)	12 (−11)	6 (−14)	−10 (−23)
Average precipitation inches (mm)	3.93 (100)	4.55 (116)	5.34 (136)	5.18 (132)	5.74 (146)	3.91 (99)	3.40 (86)	2.95 (75)	4.11 (104)	4.28 (109)	4.53 (115)	5.32 (135)	53.24 (1,353)
Average snowfall inches (cm)	0.9 (2.3)	0.8 (2.0)	0.0 (0.0)	0.0 (0.0)	0.0 (0.0)	0.0 (0.0)	0.0 (0.0)	0.0 (0.0)	0.0 (0.0)	0.0 (0.0)	0.0 (0.0)	0.1 (0.25)	1.8 (4.55)
Average precipitation days (≥ 0.01 in)	9.1	10.1	10.2	9.0	9.4	7.4	6.6	6.1	6.0	7.4	9.0	9.8	100.1
Average snowy days (≥ 0.1 in)	0.3	0.4	0.0	0.0	0.0	0.0	0.0	0.0	0.0	0.0	0.0	0.1	0.8
Source 1: NOAA
Source 2: National Weather Service

== Demographics ==
Historical population
Census	Pop.	Note	%±
1900	400		—
1910	1,247		211.8%
1920	2,052		64.6%
1930	1,607		−21.7%
1940	2,332		45.1%
1950	2,738		17.4%
1960	2,725		−0.5%
1970	3,522		29.2%
1980	4,218		19.8%
1990	5,150		22.1%
2000	4,781		−7.2%
2010	4,723		−1.2%
2020	4,261		−9.8%
2025 (est.)	4,135	▼	−3.0%
U.S. Decennial Census

=== 2020 census ===
Ashdown racial composition
Race	Number	Percentage
White (non-Hispanic)	2,476	58.11%
Black or African American (non-Hispanic)	1,371	32.18%
Native American	31	0.73%
Asian	5	0.12%
Pacific Islander	5	0.12%
Other/Mixed	216	5.07%
Hispanic or Latino	157	3.68%

As of the 2020 census, Ashdown had a population of 4,261. The median age was 41.6 years. 24.1% of residents were under the age of 18 and 20.4% were 65 years of age or older. For every 100 females, there were 88.6 males, and for every 100 females age 18 and over there were 81.8 males.

0.0% of residents lived in urban areas, while 100.0% lived in rural areas.

There were 1,795 households and 1,050 families in Ashdown, of which 30.5% of households had children under the age of 18 living in them. Of all households, 37.2% were married-couple households, 19.2% were households with a male householder and no spouse or partner present, and 37.9% were households with a female householder and no spouse or partner present. About 33.9% of all households were made up of individuals and 14.0% had someone living alone who was 65 years of age or older.

There were 1,989 housing units, of which 9.8% were vacant. The homeowner vacancy rate was 0.8% and the rental vacancy rate was 7.5%.

=== 2000 census ===
As of the census of 2000, there were 4,781 people, 1,880 households, and 1,287 families living in the city. The population density was 672.3 inhabitants per square mile (259.6/km^{2}). There were 2,103 housing units at an average density of 295.7 per square mile (114.2/km^{2}). The racial makeup of the city was 62.85% White, 34.09% Black or African American, 1.05% Native American, 0.23% Asian, 0.02% Pacific Islander, 0.48% from other races, and 1.28% from two or more races. 0.96% of the population were Hispanic or Latino of any race.

There were 1,880 households, out of which 32.5% had children under the age of 18 living with them, 45.9% were married couples living together, 19.1% had a female householder with no husband present, and 31.5% were non-families. 29.5% of all households were made up of individuals, and 14.7% had someone living alone who was 65 years of age or older. The average household size was 2.45 and the average family size was 3.00.

In the city, the population was spread out, with 26.4% under the age of 18, 9.7% from 18 to 24, 25.5% from 25 to 44, 21.8% from 45 to 64, and 16.6% who were 65 years of age or older. The median age was 36 years. For every 100 females, there were 86.1 males. For every 100 females age 18 and over, there were 78.4 males.

The median income for a household in the city was $26,754, and the median income for a family was $34,850. Males had a median income of $33,668 versus $18,073 for females. The per capita income for the city was $15,293. About 15.5% of families and 18.9% of the population were below the poverty line, including 21.6% of those under age 18 and 25.1% of those age 65 or over.

== Arts and culture ==
=== Annual cultural events ===
Downtown Ashdown hosts an annual Whistlestop Festival in May, paying homage to the importance of the railroad to the city's development. Festivities include an art show, catfish cookoff, car show, food vendors, games/activities for children, turtle races and the crowning of Miss Whistlestop. A farmer's market is hosted in City Park every Tuesday, Thursday and Saturday during the growing season.

=== Tourism ===
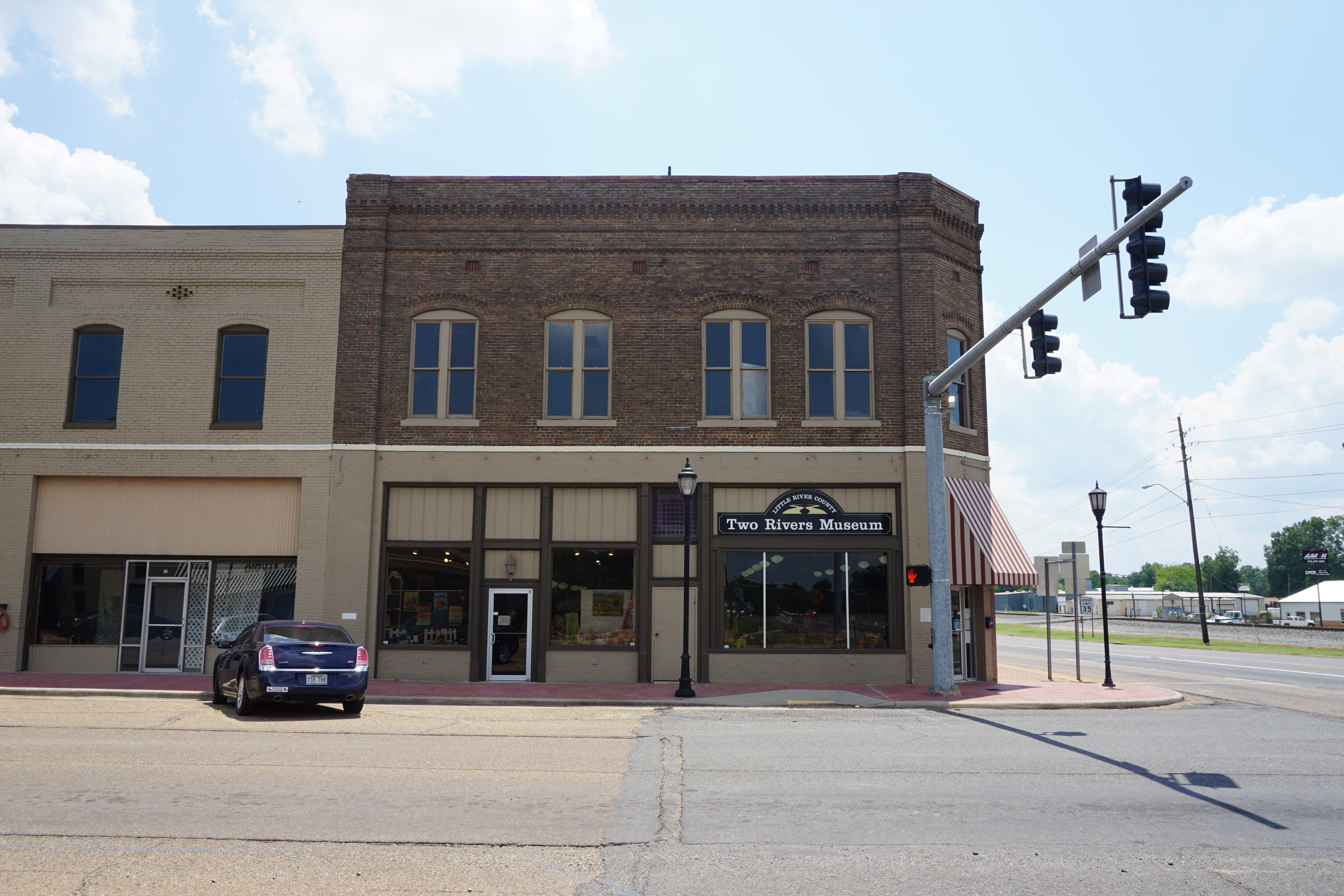
Two Rivers Museum

Downtown Ashdown has historically been the economic, social and political hub of Little River County. Today, it is preserved by the National Register of Historic Places (NRHP) as the Ashdown Commercial Historic District. Roughly bounded by Keller, E. Main, Commerce, and N. Constitution streets, the district encompasses 32 contributing properties deemed instrumental in Ashdown's farming and timber industries in the early 20th century. The nearby Memphis, Paris and Gulf Railroad Depot, also known as the Graysonia, Nashville & Ashdown Railroad Depot, appears on the National Register of Historic Places listings in Little River County, Arkansas, due to the strong tie between the success of the railroad and the Ashdown economy.

The Hunter-Coulter Museum at 310 N. 2nd Street is managed by the Little River County Historical Society. Originally built in 1918 to house a business following the railroad-inspired boom, it is one of the few remaining structures from the boom period of Ashdown's history. Today, it features period furnishings and offers a candlelight dinner around Christmas. The Two Rivers Museum at 15 E. Main Street contains a military display, "Freedom's Heroes", including World War I and World War II uniforms. A horse-drawn hearse and embalming table are also among the displays. A display honoring Henry Kaufman, founder of Kaufman Seeds, is also available to visitors.

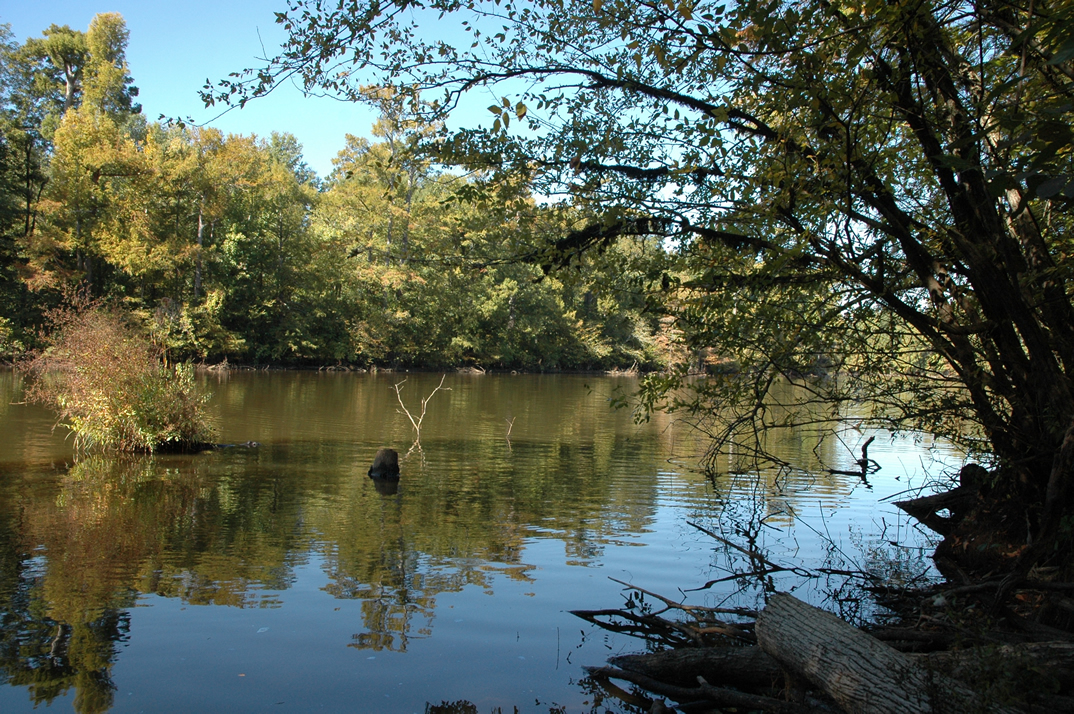
Pond Creek National Wildlife Refuge

Outdoor recreation is plentiful in Ashdown. City Park features a walking trail, playground, tennis courts, baseball and softball diamonds and horseshoe pits. It is also host to the city's farmer's market. Northeast of town, Lake Millwood offers visitors boating, fishing, camping and hiking opportunities along its shores. Along the lake, Millwood State Park is well known for birding and trophy fishing. The park also offers camping, picnic sites, trails and a marina for visitors. Golf is also available near the lake on the 18-hole golf course at the Millwood Landing Golf and RV Resort. Nearby Beard's Bluff offers camping, hiking, fishing and boating. The Pond Creek National Wildlife Refuge at the intersection of the Mississippi flyway and Central Flyway offers 30,000 acres (12,000 ha) of seasonally flooded hardwood forested wetlands that attract wintering waterfowl and deer. Seasonal hunting is offered, as well as fishing, camping and photography.

== Politics ==
The city of Ashdown has trended Republican over the past several election cycles like most other rural areas of Arkansas. The last Democrat to carry the city of Ashdown was John Kerry in 2004.

Ashdown city vote by party in presidential elections
Year	Democratic	Republican	Third Parties
2020	35.53% 583	59.35% 974	5.12% 84
2016	37.27% 637	59.04% 1,009	3.69% 63
2012	40.89% 691	57.81% 977	1.30% 22
2008	37.95% 408	59.44% 639	2.61% 28
2004	54.21% 734	45.27% 613	0.52% 7
2000	57.87% 868	41.13% 617	1.00% 15

== Education ==
Students in the Ashdown School District graduate from Ashdown High School. Postsecondary education in Ashdown is available at a local branch of the Cossatot Community College of the University of Arkansas System.

== Media ==
Ashdown's only newspaper is the weekly Little River News, publishing since 1898.

== Notable people ==
- Silas Herbert Hunt, "the first black student to be admitted for graduate or professional studies at any all-white Southern university."
- Paul Simmons, American football coach
- Hazel Walker, basketball Hall of Famer
- Montaric Brown, American professional football cornerback
- Jaden Hill, American professional baseball pitcher
