= Saline River (Little River tributary) =

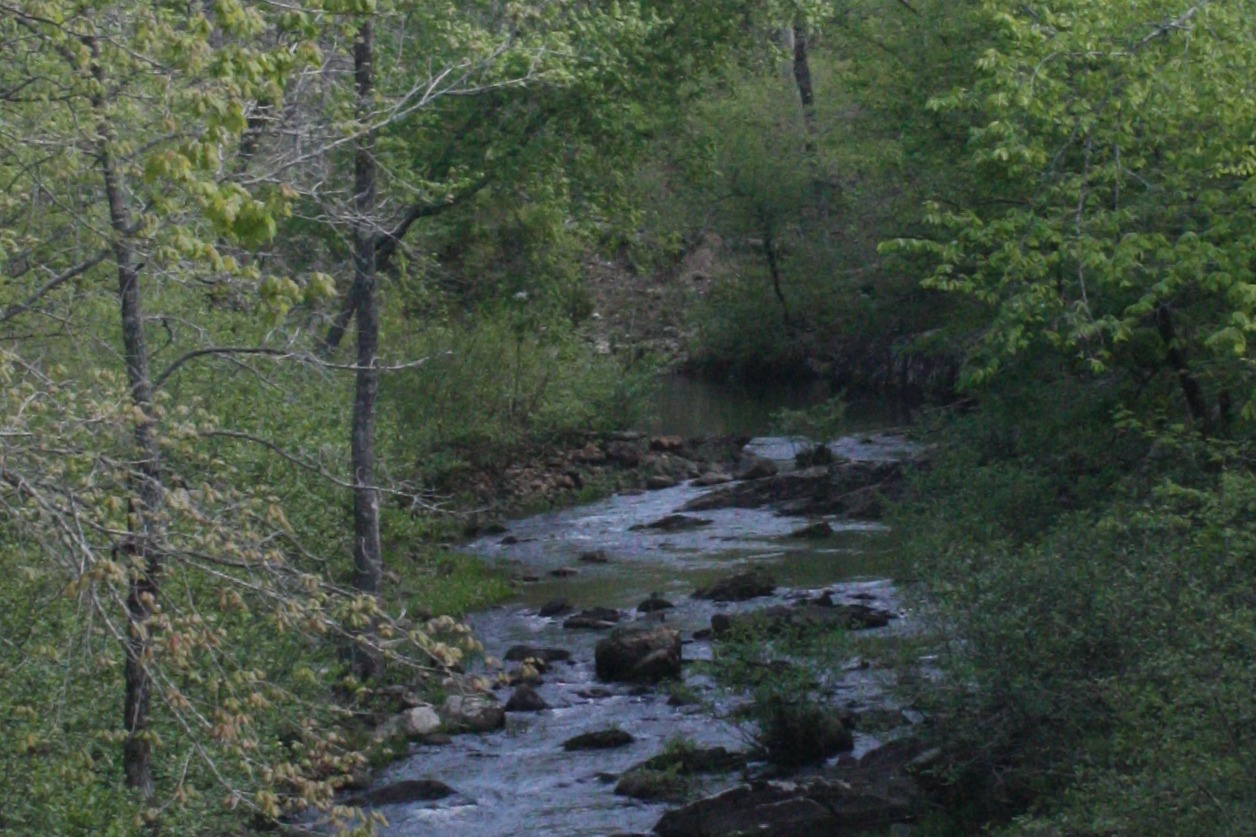
- Saline River in the Ouachita National Forest

Location
- Country: United States
- State: Arkansas

Physical characteristics
- Source
  - location: Ouachita Mountains
  - coordinates: 34°23′01″N 93°59′48″W
  - elevation: 259 feet (79 m)
- Mouth
  - location: Millwood Lake, Little River
  - coordinates: 33°43′54″N 93°58′06″W
- Length: 80 mi (130 km)
- Discharge
  - location: Lockesburg, Arkansas
  - average: 390 cu/ft. per sec.

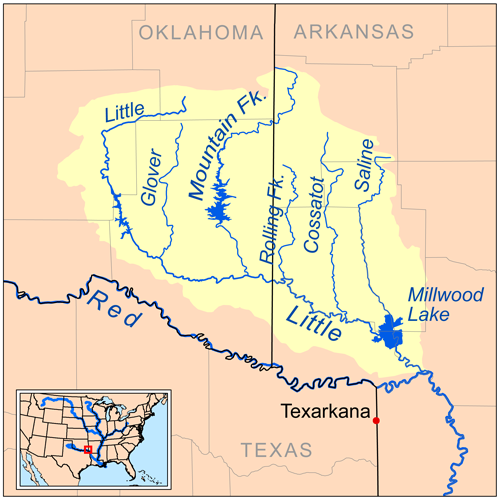
Map of the Little River watershed showing the Saline River

The Saline River is an 80-mile-long (130 km) tributary of the Little River in southwestern Arkansas in the United States. Via the Little and Red rivers, it is part of the watershed of the Mississippi River.

It rises in the Ouachita Mountains in southeastern Polk County, in the Ouachita National Forest, and flows generally south through Howard County and along Howard County's boundary with Sevier County, through Dierks Lake, which is formed by a U.S. Army Corps of Engineers dam. It enters the Little River as part of Millwood Lake, which is formed by another USACE dam on the Little River.

== See also ==
- List of Arkansas rivers
