= Wilton, Arkansas =

- City
- Location in Little River County, Arkansas
- Coordinates: 33°44′20″N 94°8′52″W
- Country: United States
- State: Arkansas
- County: Little River

Area
  - Total: 1.28 sq mi (3.31 km^{2})
  - Land: 1.28 sq mi (3.31 km^{2})
  - Water: 0 sq mi (0.00 km^{2})
- Elevation: 315 ft (96 m)

Population (2020)
  - Total: 287
  - Estimate (2025): 289 ▲
  - Density: 224.4/sq mi (86.63/km^{2})
- Time zone: UTC-6 (Central (CST))
  - Summer (DST): UTC-5 (CDT)
- ZIP code: 71865
- Area code: 870
- FIPS code: 05-75980
- GNIS feature ID: 2405759

Wilton is a city in Little River County, Arkansas, United States. As of the 2020 census, Wilton had a population of 287.

== Geography ==
Wilton is located in northeastern Little River County. U.S. Routes 59 and 71 pass through the city as its Main Street. The highway leads south 5 miles (8 km) to Ashdown, the county seat, and north 16 miles (26 km) to Lockesburg.

According to the United States Census Bureau, Wilton has a total area of 1.3 square miles (3.3 km^{2}), all land.

== Demographics ==
Historical population
Census	Pop.	Note	%±
1910	294		—
1920	285		−3.1%
1930	313		9.8%
1940	319		1.9%
1950	328		2.8%
1960	329		0.3%
1970	427		29.8%
1980	495		15.9%
1990	449		−9.3%
2000	439		−2.2%
2010	374		−14.8%
2020	287		−23.3%
2025 (est.)	289	▲	0.7%
U.S. Decennial Census

As of the census of 2000, there were 439 people, 162 households, and 121 families residing in the town. The population density was 336.7 inhabitants per square mile (130.0/km^{2}). There were 202 housing units at an average density of 154.9 per square mile (59.8/km^{2}). The racial makeup of the town was 58.31% White, 40.77% Black or African American, and 0.91% from two or more races.

There were 162 households, out of which 30.2% had children under the age of 18 living with them, 50.6% were married couples living together, 16.0% had a female householder with no husband present, and 25.3% were non-families. 23.5% of all households were made up of individuals, and 11.1% had someone living alone who was 65 years of age or older. The average household size was 2.71 and the average family size was 3.12.

In the town the population was spread out, with 26.0% under the age of 18, 10.0% from 18 to 24, 25.3% from 25 to 44, 22.8% from 45 to 64, and 15.9% who were 65 years of age or older. The median age was 37 years. For every 100 females, there were 109.0 males. For every 100 females age 18 and over, there were 108.3 males.

The median income for a household in the town was $31,696, and the median income for a family was $32,019. Males had a median income of $30,625 versus $16,563 for females. The per capita income for the town was $13,478. About 8.1% of families and 15.2% of the population were below the poverty line, including 19.4% of those under age 18 and 22.1% of those age 65 or over.

== Notable people ==
- L. Clifford Davis, civil rights, attorney, judge
