= Beech Street =

Beech Street may refer to:

- Beech Street (London), a street in central London, England
- Beech Street Historic District (Helena-West Helena, Arkansas), listed on the National Register of Historic Places
- Beech Street Historic District (Texarkana, Arkansas), listed on the National Register of Historic Places
- Beech Street Brick Street, Texas
- Beech Street School, New Jersey
- Gill Stadium in New Hampshire, formerly the Beech Street Grounds

== See also ==
- Beach Street (disambiguation)
