= Beech Street Historic District =

Beech Street Historic District may refer to the following places:

- Beech Street Historic District (Helena-West Helena, Arkansas), listed on the National Register of Historic Places
- Beech Street Historic District (Texarkana, Arkansas), listed on the National Register of Historic Places
