= Crable Site =

Archaeological site in Fulton County, Illinois

Crable site
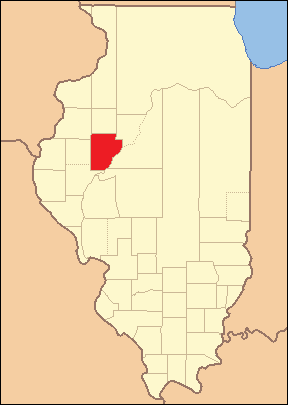
- Periods: Mississippian
- Cultures: Southeastern Ceremonial Complex
- Location: Fulton County, Illinois

History
- Built: c. 900
- Abandoned: c. 1450

Site notes
- Area: 100 acres (40 ha)
- Excavation dates: 1930s, 1950s
- Archaeologists: Edgar McDonald; Dan Morse
- Discovered: 1879
- Owner: Private
- Public access: Access restricted

The Crable site is an Indigenous archaeological site located in Fulton County, Illinois, near the Illinois River and Anderson Lake.

== Geographical setting ==
The site is located on the Norman Crable farm in the southeast corner of Fulton County, Illinois. It is situated on a series of bluffs and ridges a few hundred feet from a spring, which most likely provided an abundant drinking water source for the people of the Crable site. Dozens of mounds contribute to the “mound field,” the largest of these being about 12 feet high and 60 feet in diameter. The site has an area of about 100 acres with most of the artifacts found in an area less than 25 acres, located near the mound field.

== Culture ==
Indigenous peoples occupied the site during the Middle Mississippian period, about 900 to 1450, with the earliest shells dating to about 800 and charcoal fragments dating to about 1420. The Crable site can be referred to as a Southeastern Ceremonial Complex site because it was occupied during the Mississippian period and is characterized by artifacts and iconography that followed the adoption of maize as a main food source and chiefdom social stratification.

The Crable site also demonstrates some cross-cultural blending between the Spoon River (Middle Mississippi) and Oneota (Upper Mississippi) traits. There is also evidence of an earlier Hopewellian occupancy.

== Excavations ==
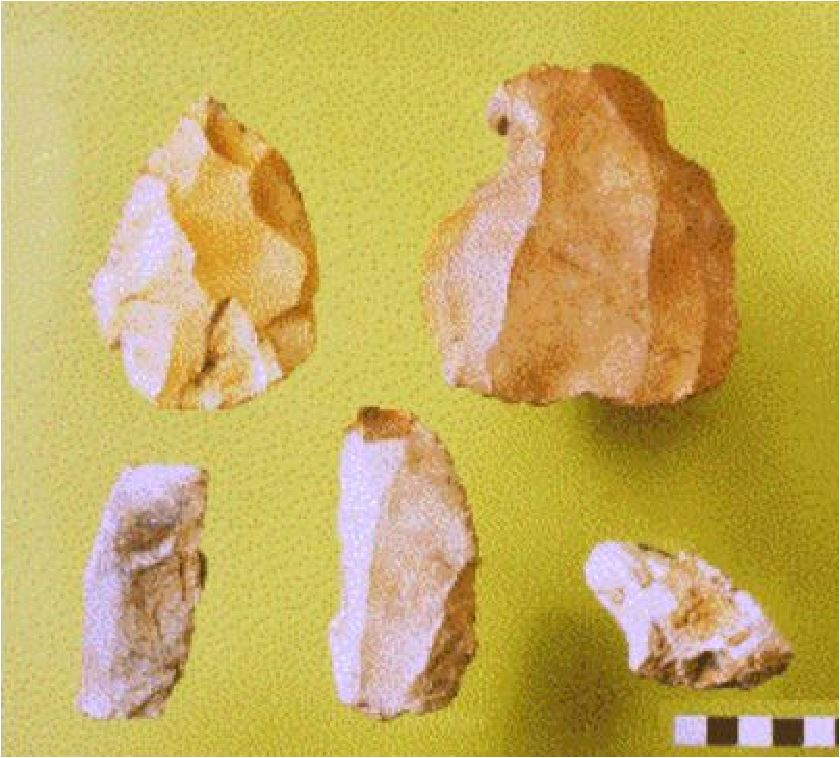
Example of a flint tool

Archaeologists have observed and excavated the site several times. The earliest known publication of the site's existence is from 1879. Edgar McDonald and his father Charles excavated the site in the early 1930s, followed by the University of Chicago, and Dan Morse, who excavated and researched the site in the 1950s.

== Human burials ==
Four cemeteries have been discovered at this site; the largest estimated to have over 200 bodies. Most of the graves feature extended burial, in which the body lies flat in an extended position, and some also feature double burial, in which two people are buried at the same gravesite. A large proportion of children buried at these cemeteries indicates a high infant mortality rate. The burial sites are heterogeneous, meaning that there was no clear pattern or uniformity in the orientation the bodies were buried or what they were buried with.

Some bodies were buried with copper beads and ornaments, others with engraved shell pendants, both of which are characteristic of Southeastern Ceremonial Complex societies from this period. The shells found in this area are clam shells and turtle shells, most likely coming from the nearby lake and river.

== Artifacts ==
By digging a trench into the center of the largest mound, McDonald found refuse pits that contained effigy appendages, bone hair ornaments, engraved vessels and bottles, fire basin fragments, antlers, and bones. There were also two building structures and altars found within the mound, and this combined with the placement of the burial sites surrounding the mound indicates that it was a temple mound.

Flint tools were also very common in this area. Flint tools included spears and knives, some with notches and fluted points. A mace found at Crable was made of kaolin flint from southern Illinois quarries, similar to relics found at Cahokia, Spiro, Crenshaw, and other Caddo mounds.

Pottery and potsherds are common in this area. The incised square crosses and suns on the fragments of pottery are similar to designs across the broader Mississippian region. Plate fragments with sun symbols, also known as a Crable Deep Plate or O'Byam Incised, were carbon dated to the Sand Prairie phase and are considered rare. Although effigy pottery is not common in Illinois, the Crable site along with Dickson Mounds produced several effigy vessel artifacts. Other types of pottery were also found at the Crable site.
