= Alvah Horace Whitmarsh House =

Historic house in Arkansas, United States

- U.S. National Register of Historic Places
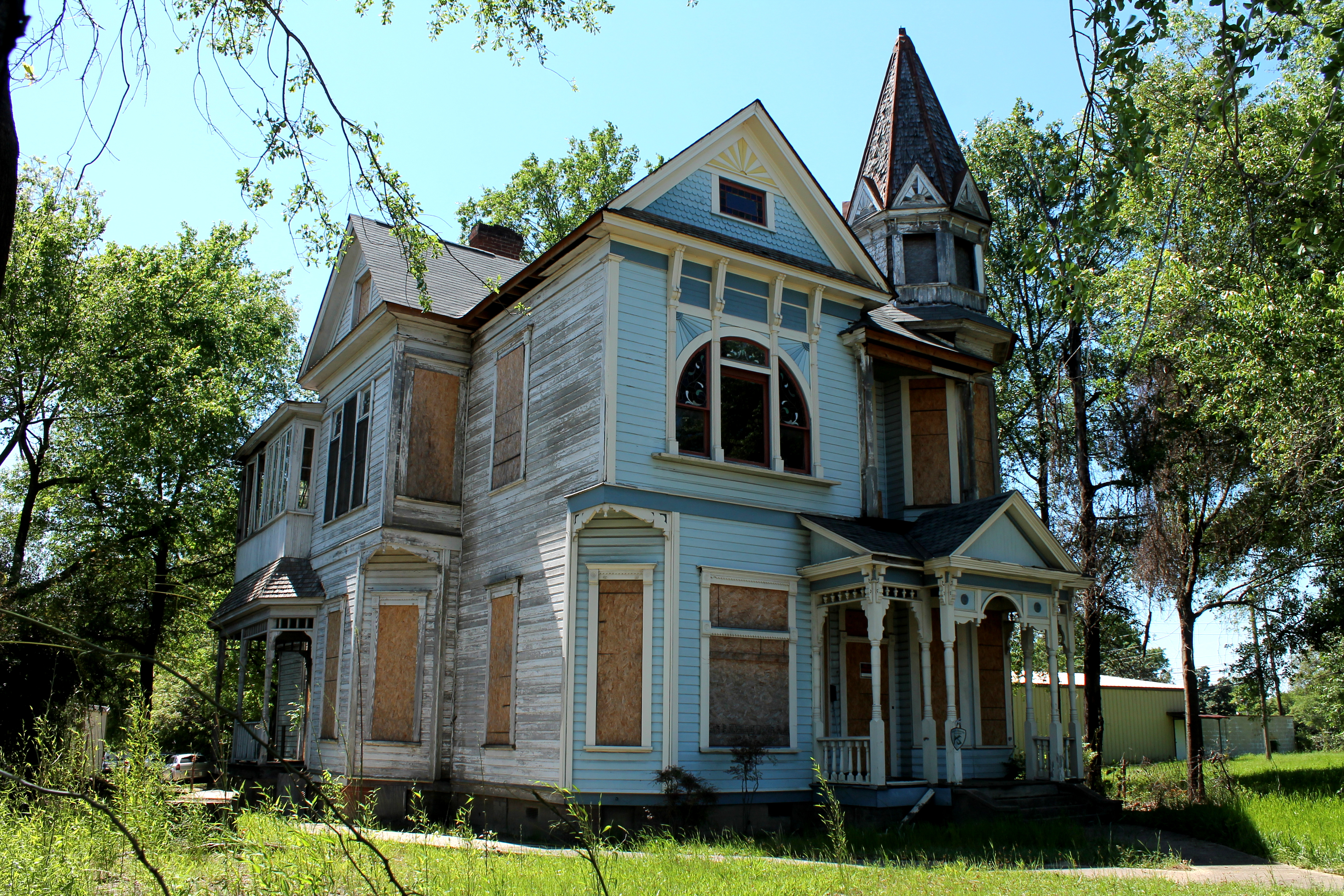

- Location within Arkansas Location within the United States
- Location: 711 Pecan St., Texarkana, Arkansas
- Coordinates: 33°25′57″N 94°2′26″W
- Area: Less than one acre
- Built: 1894
- Architectural style: Late Victorian, Queen Anne
- Demolished: 2021
- NRHP reference No.: 80000778
- Added to NRHP: August 29, 1980

The Alvah Horace Whitmarsh House was a historic house at 711 Pecan Street in Texarkana, Arkansas. This 2 1/2-story wood-frame structure was one of the city's finest Queen Anne Victorians, located in a neighborhood that was fashionable at the turn of the 20th century. The house had an elaborately decorated front porch and a three-story hexagonal tower, capped by a pointed roof, at its northeast corner. The house was built in 1894 for Alvah Whitmarsh, a manager at the local Buchanan Lumber Company and a local leader in civic affairs.

The house was listed on the National Register of Historic Places in 1980. The house was destroyed by a fire on October 24, 2021.

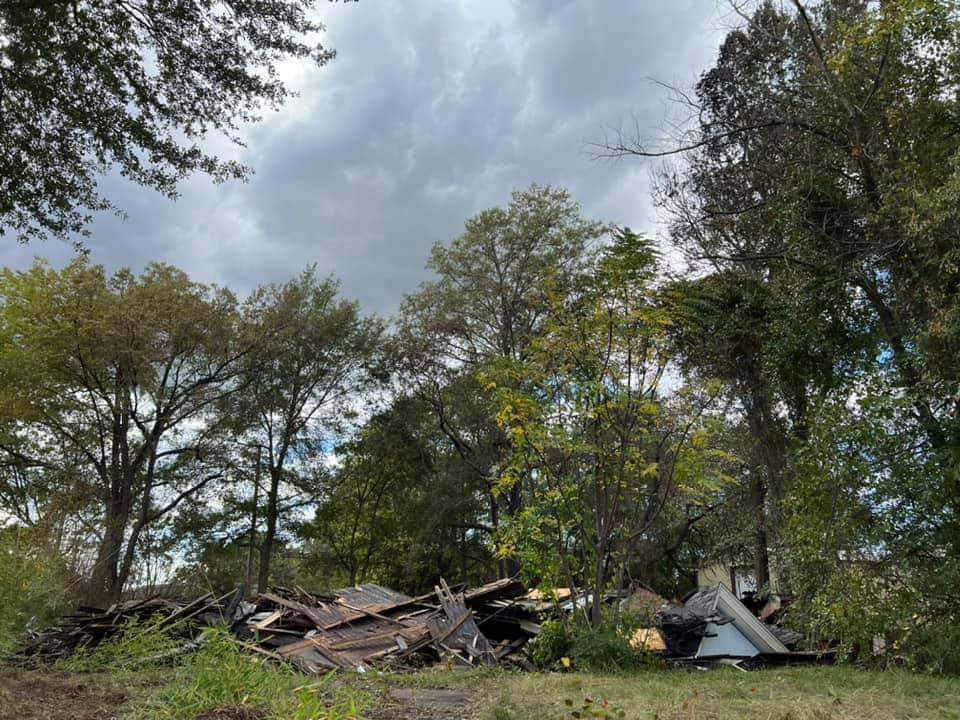
Alvah Horace Whitmarsh House after fire on October 24, 2021

== See also ==
- National Register of Historic Places listings in Miller County, Arkansas
