= Ritchie Grocery Building =

- U.S. National Register of Historic Places
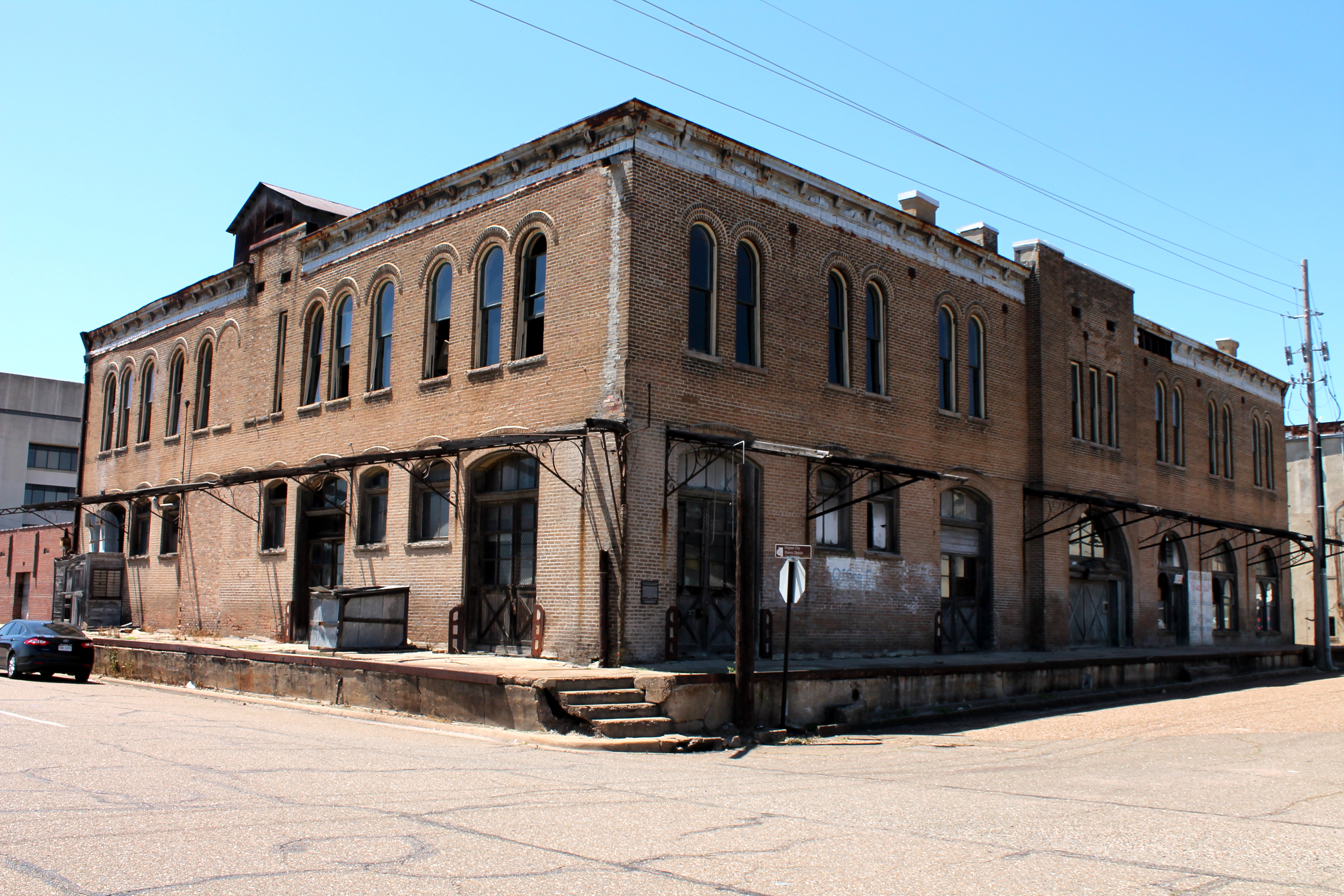

- Location within Arkansas Location within the United States
- Location: Jct. of Front and Olive Sts., Texarkana, Arkansas
- Coordinates: 33°25′15″N 94°2′29″W
- Area: less than one acre
- Architectural style: Romanesque
- NRHP reference No.: 90000900
- Added to NRHP: June 14, 1990

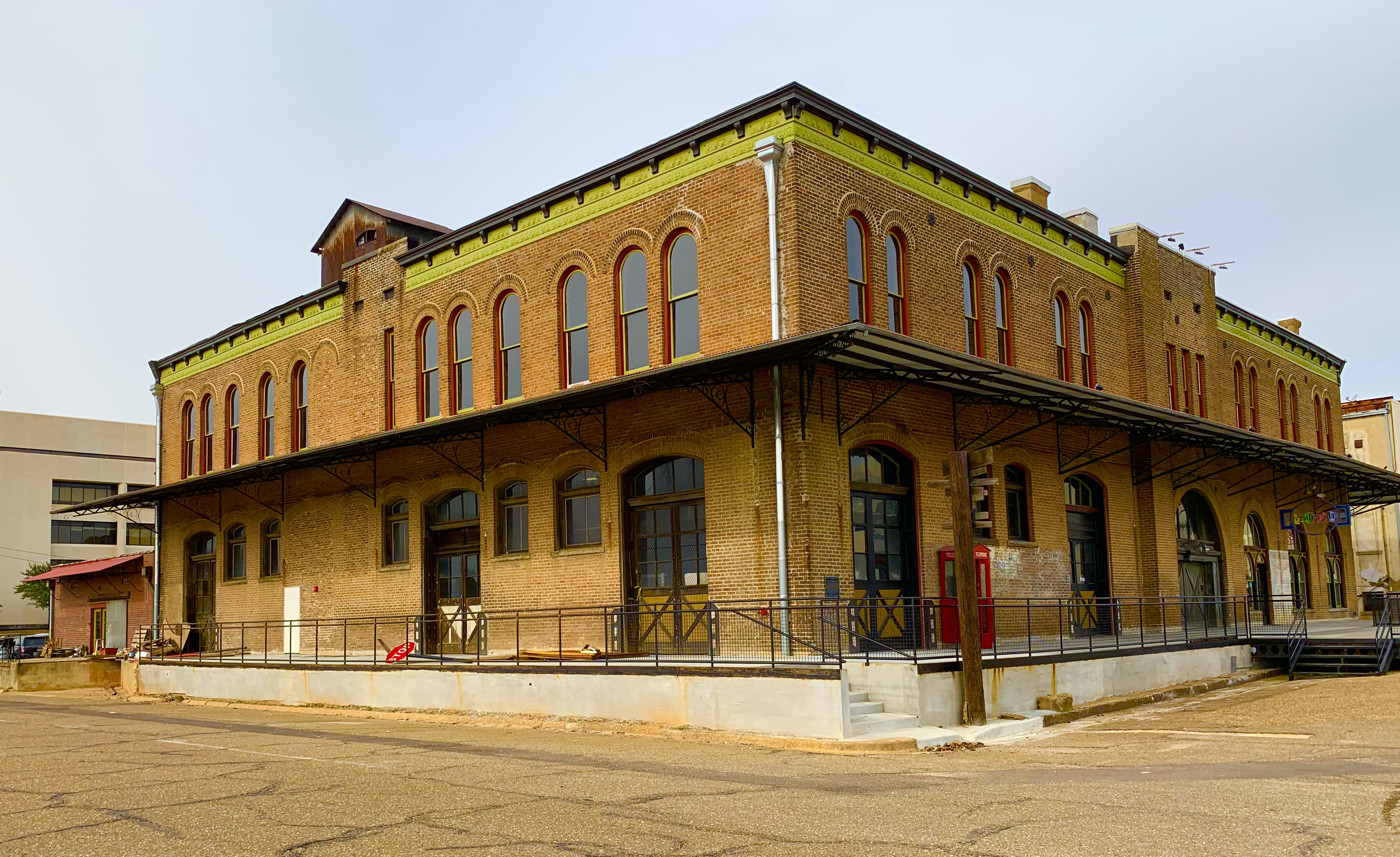
Ritchie Grocery (Now called 1894 City Market) renovated Exterior from January 2019

The Ritchie Grocery Building is a historic commercial building at Front and Olive Streets in Texarkana, Arkansas. It is a two-story brick and masonry building with a flat roof and a parapet along the main facade. It was built in 1894 by Francis Mullins, owner of the Texas Produce Company, the first major grocery wholesaler in the city, founded in 1884. It is the only surviving Romanesque Revival building in downtown Texarkana, and the building was purchased by the Ritchie Grocery Company in 1926. The building was purchased in 2017 by 1894 LLC and is being renovated to its original glory. The name of the building was changed to 1894 City Market, 1894CityMarket . An art gallery is housed on the first floor, an event room on the second floor, and loft apartments on the third.

The building was listed on the National Register of Historic Places in 1990.

== See also ==
- National Register of Historic Places listings in Miller County, Arkansas
