= Patrick J. Ahern House =

Historic house in Arkansas, United States

- U.S. National Register of Historic Places
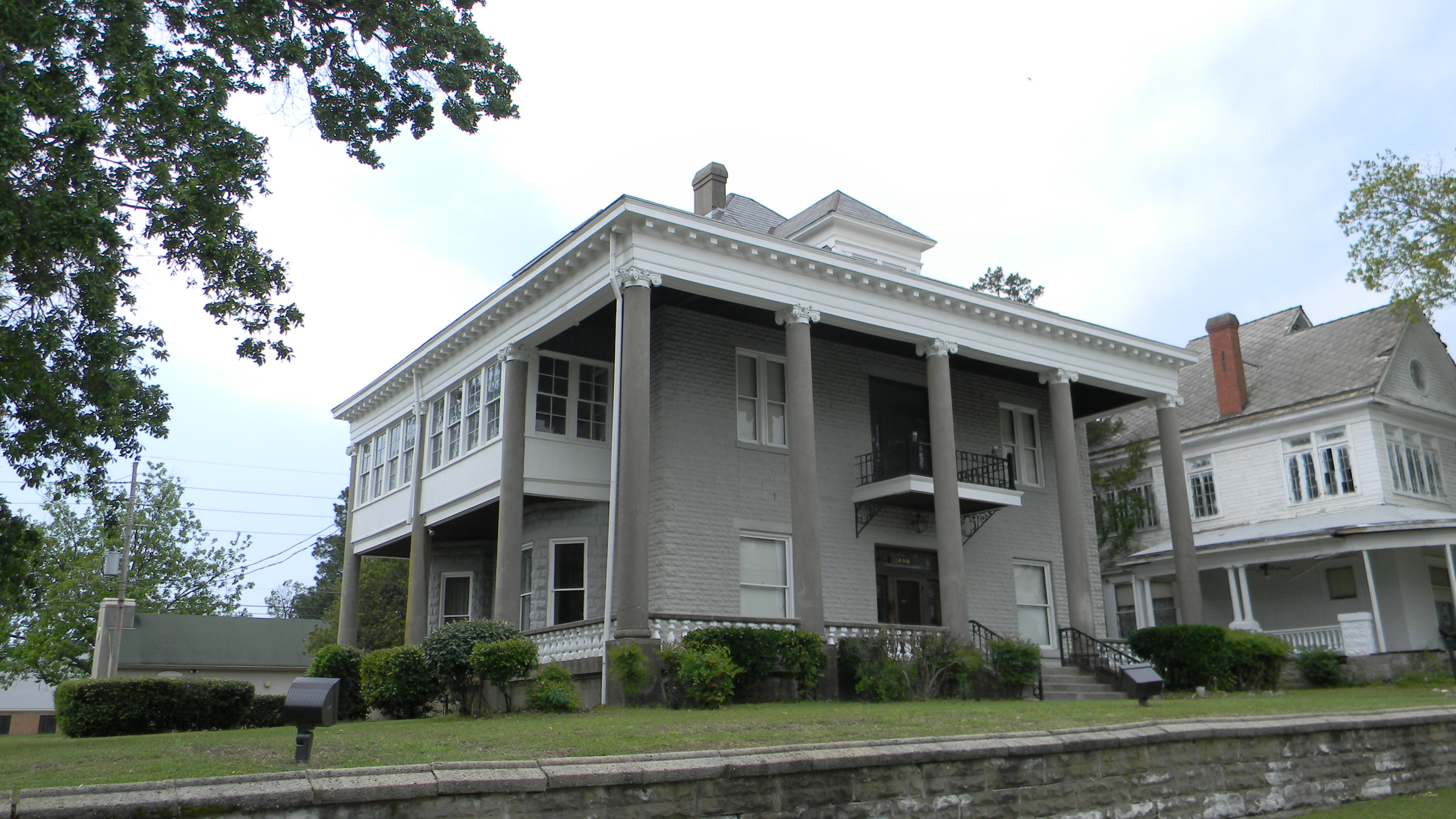

- Location within Arkansas Location within the United States
- Location: 403 Laurel Street; Texarkana, Arkansas
- Coordinates: 33°25′35″N 94°2′23″W
- Area: less than one acre
- Built: 1906
- Architect: Burdsal Company
- Architectural style: Classical Revival
- NRHP reference No.: 04001508
- Added to NRHP: January 20, 2005

The Patrick J. Ahern Home is a Classical Revival style historic house located at 403 Laurel Street in Texarkana, Arkansas. It is privately owned and operated by descendants of Patrick and Mary Ahern.

== Description and history ==
It is a large 2 1/2-story concrete block structure, set on a corner lot with a low retaining wall, which serves to accentuate the buildings already large scale. The hip roof projects over the street-facing sides and is supported on those sides by two-story Doric columns. On the side facing East 4th Street, a portion of the upper level has been enclosed, one of the few alterations made to the structure since its construction. It was built in 1905, during the city's boom years, by Patrick Ahern, an Irish immigrant who owned a dry goods business, and has remained in the hands of his descendants.

The house was listed on the National Register of Historic Places on January 20, 2005.

=== History ===
The P. J. Ahern Home was built in 1905 by Patrick J. and Mary Ahern. Patrick was an Irish immigrant who immigrated to the United States in 1882 to join his childhood friend, Roger O'Dwyer, in a business venture in Texarkana, Arkansas. The O'Dwyer and Ahern mercantile became one of the largest retail stores in Texarkana. Patrick married Mary Olive Lansdale in 1902, and the couple began plans for a large house constructed of concrete blocks. The materials used to construct the home, including window glass, was sourced locally with the exception of hand-glazed fireplace tiles imported from Italy.

== See also ==
- National Register of Historic Places listings in Miller County, Arkansas
