= Averitt House (Mount Pleasant, Miller County, Arkansas) =

Historic house in Arkansas, United States

- U.S. National Register of Historic Places
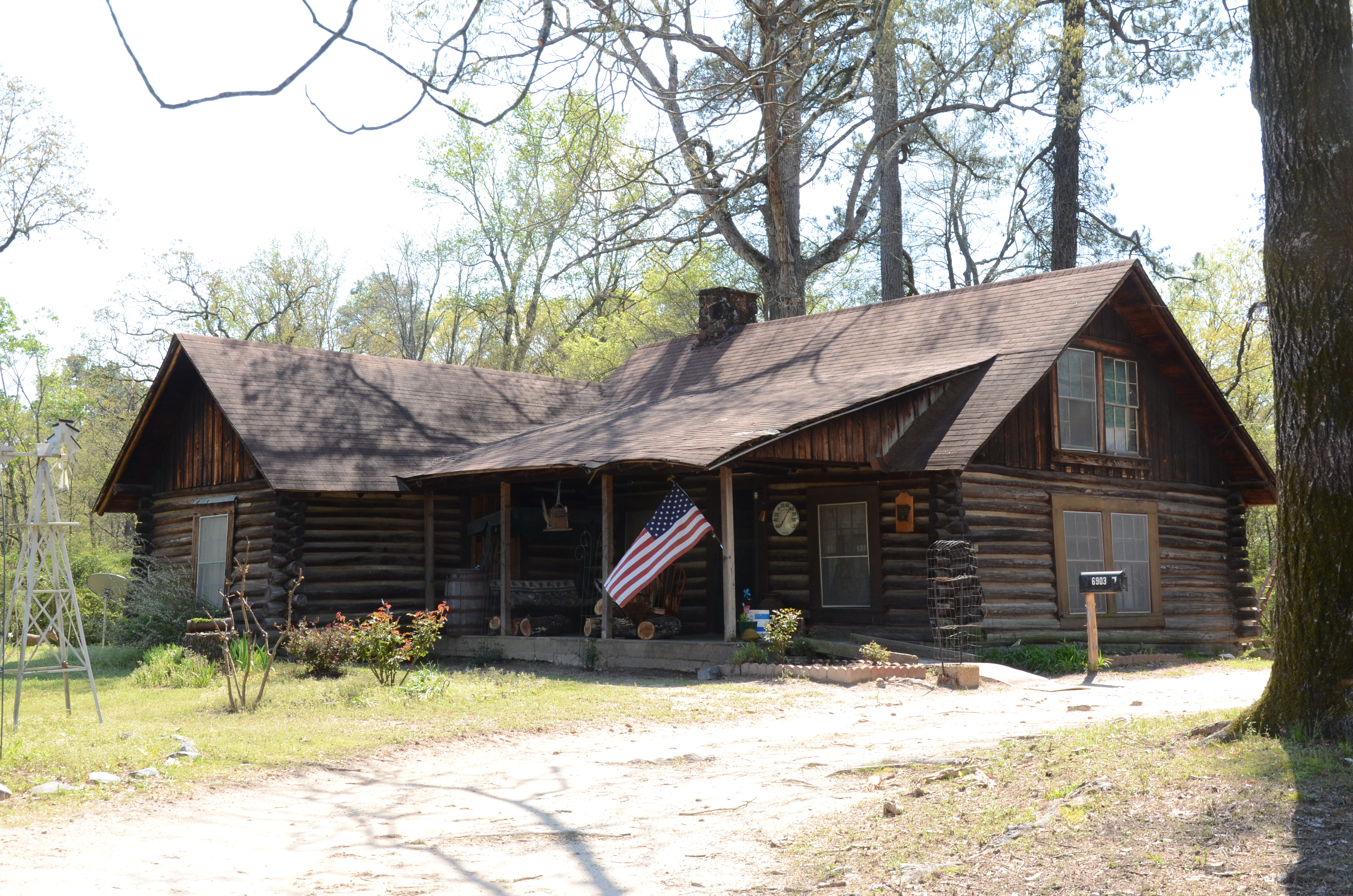

- Location within Arkansas Location within the United States
- Nearest city: Mount Pleasant, Arkansas
- Coordinates: 33°20′50″N 93°57′51″W
- Area: less than one acre
- Built: 1933
- Architect: Tim Averitt
- NRHP reference No.: 92000958
- Added to NRHP: July 24, 1992

The Averitt House is a historic house in the rural central part of Miller County, Arkansas. It is a single-story log structure, located about 7 miles (11 km) south of Texarkana on the west side of United States Route 71. It was built in 1931-33 by Tom Averitt, the local health inspector at the time, and is a locally unique example of rustic log architecture. It is roughly L-shaped, with a shed-roof porch on its northeastern facade. A single fieldstone chimney rises through the roof near the junction of the L. The walls are made of unfinished logs joined by saddle notches. The logs for its construction were supposedly taken by clearing the site on which it stands. Not far from the house stands a garage, also built by Averitt from logs.

The house was listed on the National Register of Historic Places in 1992.

== See also ==
- National Register of Historic Places listings in Miller County, Arkansas
