= Wynn-Price House =

Historic house in Arkansas, United States

- U.S. National Register of Historic Places
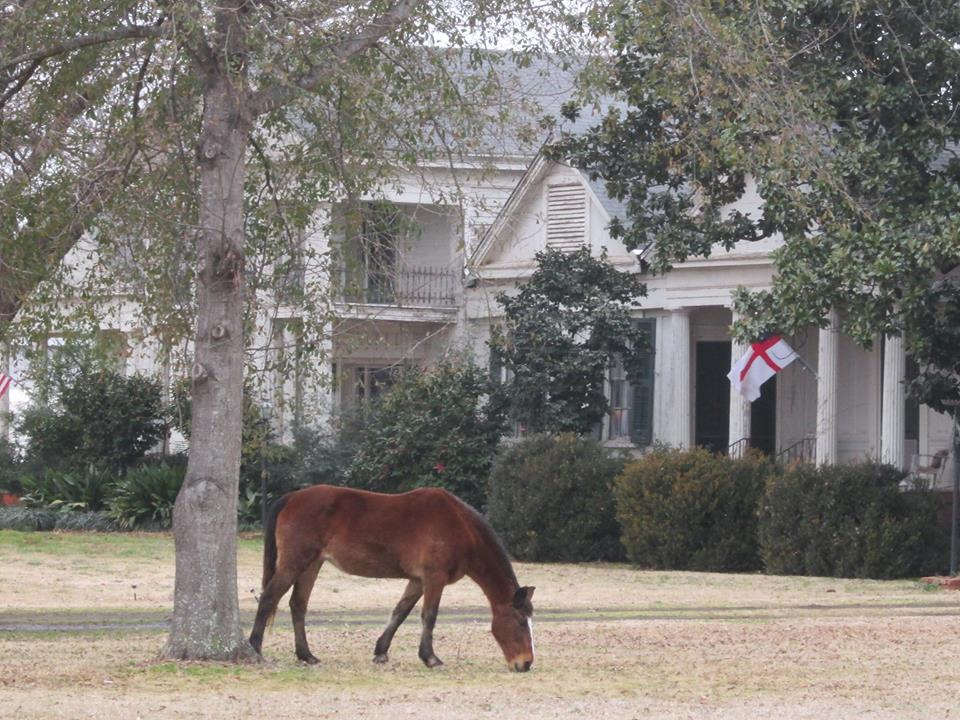

- Location within Arkansas Location within the United States
- Nearest city: Garland, Arkansas
- Coordinates: 33°21′48″N 93°43′24″W
- Area: 4 acres (1.6 ha)
- Architect: William Wynn
- Architectural style: Greek Revival
- NRHP reference No.: 90001950
- Added to NRHP: January 23, 1992

The Wynn-Price House is a historic house on Price Drive, just outside Garland, Arkansas. The house is a rambling two-story wood-frame structure, roughly in an "E" shape, with three gable-roofed sections joined by hyphen sections. The gable ends have columned porticos, and the southern (front) facade has an elaborate two-story Greek temple front. With its oldest portion dating to 1844, it is one Arkansas' finest antebellum Greek Revival plantation houses. It was built by William Wynn, one of the region's most successful antebellum plantation owners.

The house was listed on the National Register of Historic Places in 1992.

== See also ==
- National Register of Historic Places listings in Miller County, Arkansas
