= Claude Fouke House =

Historic house in Arkansas, United States

- Formerly listed on the U.S. National Register of Historic Places
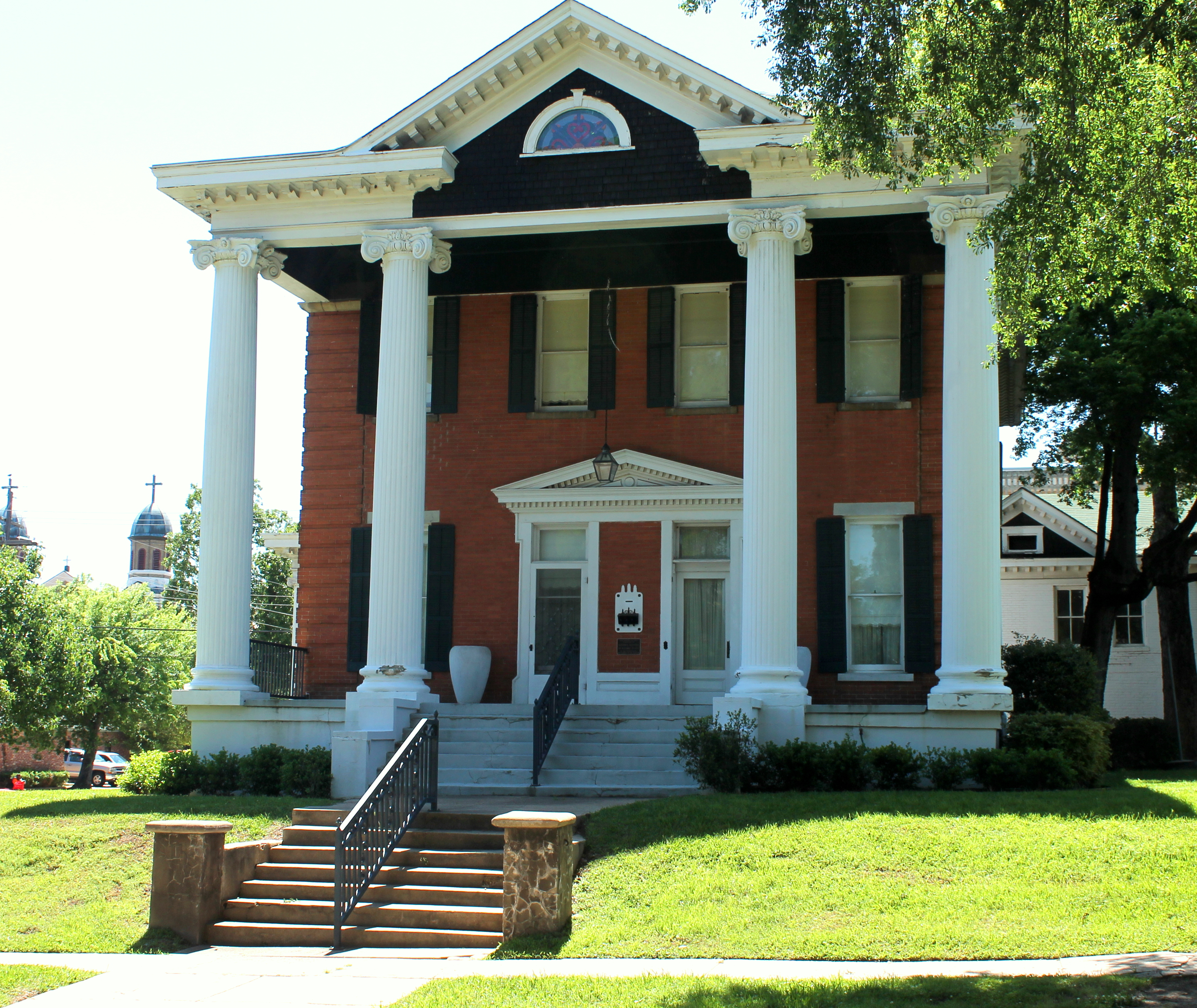

- Location within Arkansas Location within the United States
- Location: 501 Pecan St., Texarkana, Arkansas
- Coordinates: 33°25′41″N 94°2′9″W
- Area: less than one acre
- Built: 1903
- Built by: Claude Fouke
- Architectural style: Classical Revival
- NRHP reference No.: 82002125

Significant dates
- Added to NRHP: April 22, 1982
- Removed from NRHP: September 2, 2022

The Claude Fouke House (Note: The NRHP nomination form uses the spelling "Claude Foulke House" contrary to all other sources.) was a historic house at 501 Pecan Street in Texarkana, Arkansas. It was a two-story brick structure with a hip roof, set on a raised corner lot. It was one of the city's most elaborate Classical Revival structures, with a monumental temple front supported by pairs of fluted Ionic columns rising to the full height of the facade. The roof had an elaborate modillioned cornice, with a small triangular pediment containing a half-round window. The interior of the house contained equally impressive woodwork. The house was built in 1903 by Claude Fouke, the son of railroad baron George Fouke.

The house was listed on the National Register of Historic Places in 1982.

After 28 months of neglect by the owner, Beech Street First Baptist Church, the structure was demolished and the debris removed in March 2022. It was delisted in September 2022.

== See also ==
- Fouke, Arkansas
- National Register of Historic Places listings in Miller County, Arkansas
