= Charles J. Neif House =

Historic house in Arkansas, United States

- U.S. National Register of Historic Places
- Location within Arkansas Location within the United States
- Location: 1410 Pecan St., Texarkana, Arkansas
- Coordinates: 33°26′12″N 94°2′13″W
- Area: less than one acre
- Built: 1914
- Architectural style: Bungalow/craftsman
- NRHP reference No.: 94000822
- Added to NRHP: August 5, 1994

The Charles J. Neif House is a historic house at 1410 Pecan Street in Texarkana, Arkansas. It is a single-story wood-frame structure clad in novelty siding. The house has a poorly-documented construction history, but is distinctive as a well-preserved Craftsman-style bungalow in a neighborhood of later and larger houses. The land on which it stands was subdivided for development in 1894, and a house had been built on the land by 1905, probably by Charles Neif. In 1910 the property was acquired by Albert T. O'Neill, whose family lived there until 1915. It appears likely that O'Neill gave the earlier structure its Craftsman appearance, with broad overhangs and exposed rafters, although evidence of its earlier history survives in its one-over-one windows, which are a form more typically found in turn-of-the-century construction.

The house was listed on the National Register of Historic Places in 1994.

== See also ==
- National Register of Historic Places listings in Miller County, Arkansas
