= Hopkins Feed and Seed Store =

- Hopkins Feed and Seed Store; Sneed's Feed and Seed
- U.S. National Register of Historic Places
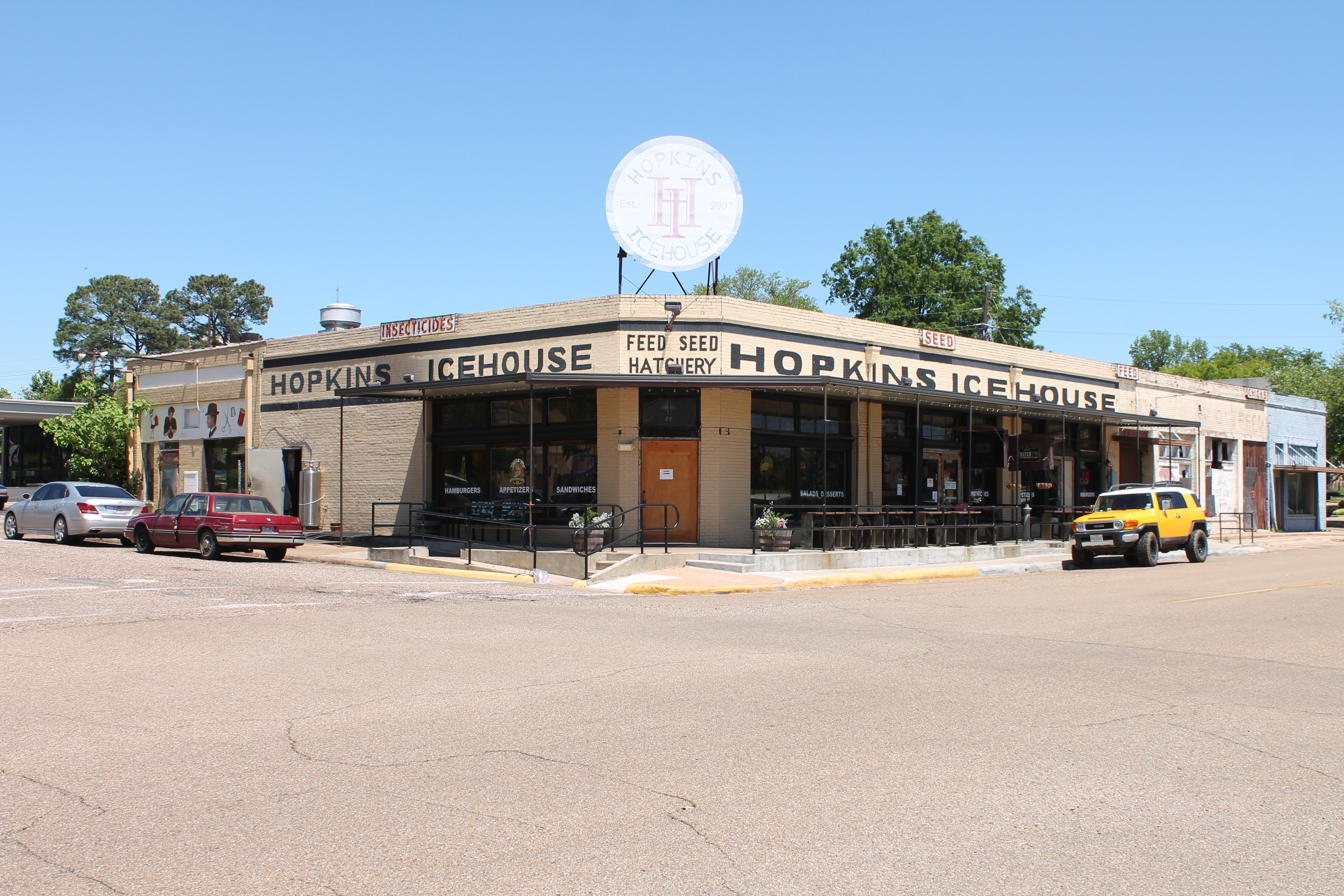

- Location within Arkansas Location within the United States
- Location: 301 E. 3rd St., Texarkana, Arkansas
- Coordinates: 33°25′32″N 94°2′9″W
- Area: less than one acre
- Built: 1922
- Architectural style: Early Commercial
- MPS: Historic Buildings of Texarkana, Arkansas, MPS
- NRHP reference No.: 08000728
- Added to NRHP: August 1, 2008

The Hopkins Feed and Seed Store is a historic commercial building at 301 East 3rd Street in downtown Texarkana, Arkansas. It is a single-story brick building roughly rectangular, with a beveled entrance at the corner of 3rd and South Wood Streets. It was built c. 1922 to be a fancy German car dealership. In the 1930s Roy D Hopkins purchased the building which was Feeder Supply at the time and created Roy D Hopkins Feed and Seed, who operated a feed store and chicken hatchery on the premises. The building currently is a Grill and bar named after Roy D Hopkins, Hopkins Icehouse which has been in operation since 2009. this is the only one of the period to survive on the block.

The building was listed on the National Register of Historic Places in 2008.

== See also ==
- National Register of Historic Places listings in Miller County, Arkansas
