= Wallace Adams Service Station =

- U.S. National Register of Historic Places
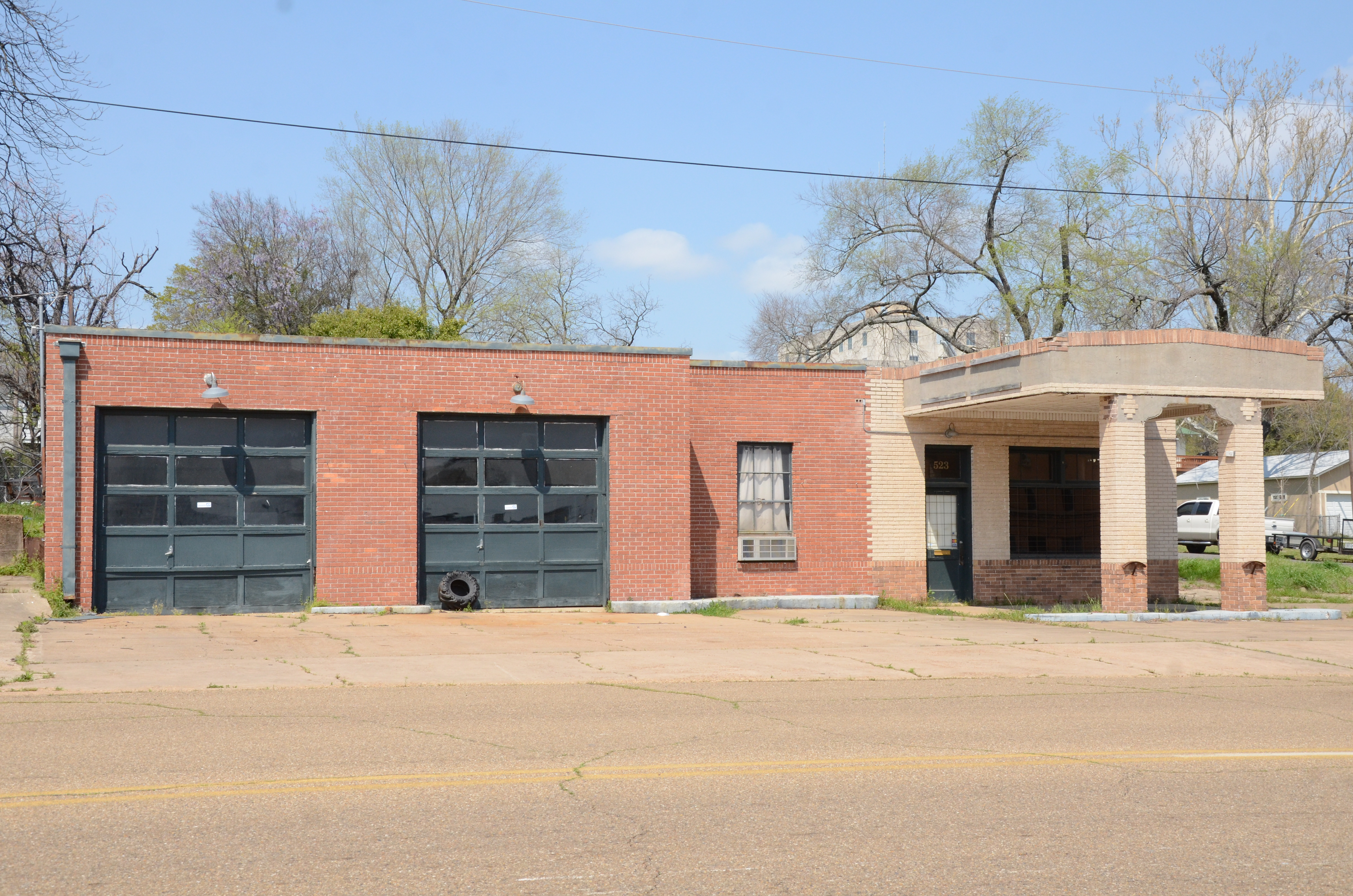

- Location within Arkansas Location within the United States
- Location: 523 E. 23rd St., Texarkana, Arkansas
- Coordinates: 33°25′36″N 94°2′18″W
- Area: less than one acre
- Built: 1929
- Architectural style: Early Commercial
- MPS: Historic Buildings of Texarkana, Arkansas, MPS
- NRHP reference No.: 08000726
- Added to NRHP: August 1, 2008

The Wallace Adams Service Station is a historic automotive service facility at 523 East 3rd Street in Texarkana, Arkansas. It is a single-story brick building with a flat roof, with a covered service bay projecting from the front, supported by brick columns. It was built c. 1929, and is the only surviving service station of its period in the city. Wallace Adams, the proprietor, lived in a house (now demolished) that stood next door.

The property was listed on the National Register of Historic Places in 2008.

== See also ==
- National Register of Historic Places listings in Miller County, Arkansas
