= Cotton Belt Railroad Office Building =

- U.S. National Register of Historic Places
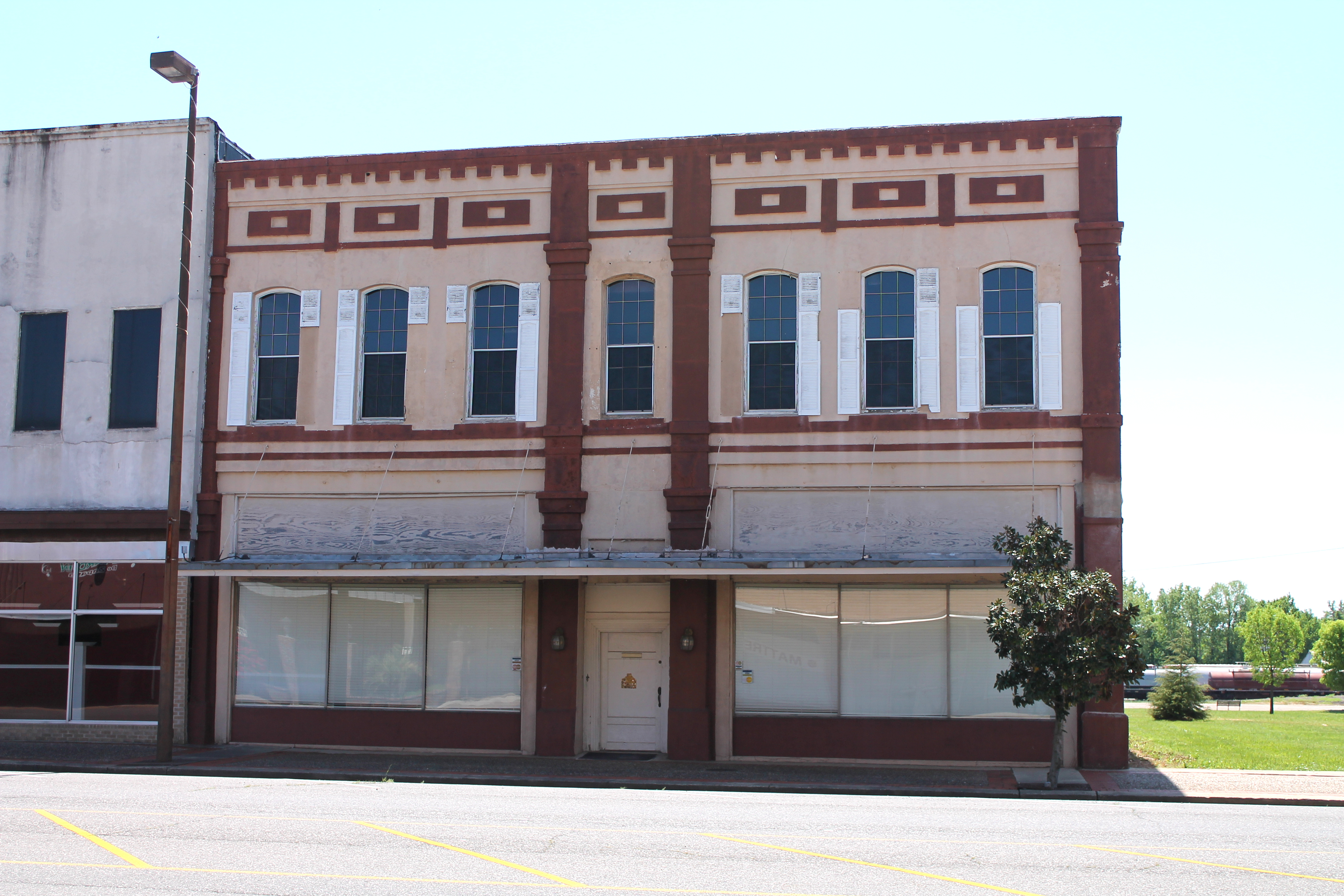

- Location within Arkansas Location within the United States
- Location: 312 E. Broad St., Texarkana, Arkansas
- Coordinates: 33°25′27″N 94°2′24″W
- Area: less than one acre
- Built: 1910
- Architectural style: Early Commercial
- MPS: Historic Buildings of Texarkana, Arkansas, MPS
- NRHP reference No.: 08000727
- Added to NRHP: August 1, 2008

The Cotton Belt Railroad Office Building is a historic commercial building at 312 East Broad Street in Texarkana, Arkansas. Built c. 1910, this two-story brick building is one of the oldest buildings in downtown Texarkana. Its exterior walls have been stuccoed, and it has a flat roof behind a stuccoed brick parapet. It has vernacular Italianate styling, with two-story pilasters separating the front bays, and dentil molding at the roof line. The main facade is divided into three bays, the central one providing the main entry on the first floor, and an arched-top window above. The flanking bays are plate glass on the first floor, with tripled sash windows above. The building's first tenant was the Cotton Belt Railroad, whose arrival was responsible for Texarkana's significant growth in the early 20th century.

The building was listed on the National Register of Historic Places in 2008.

== See also ==
- National Register of Historic Places listings in Miller County, Arkansas
