= Beach Road =

Beach Road may refer to:

- Beach Road, Melbourne, Australia
- Beach Road, Perth, Australia
- Beach Road, Visakhapatnam, India
- Beach Road, Singapore

== See also ==
- Beach Street (disambiguation)
