= Orr School =

- U.S. National Register of Historic Places
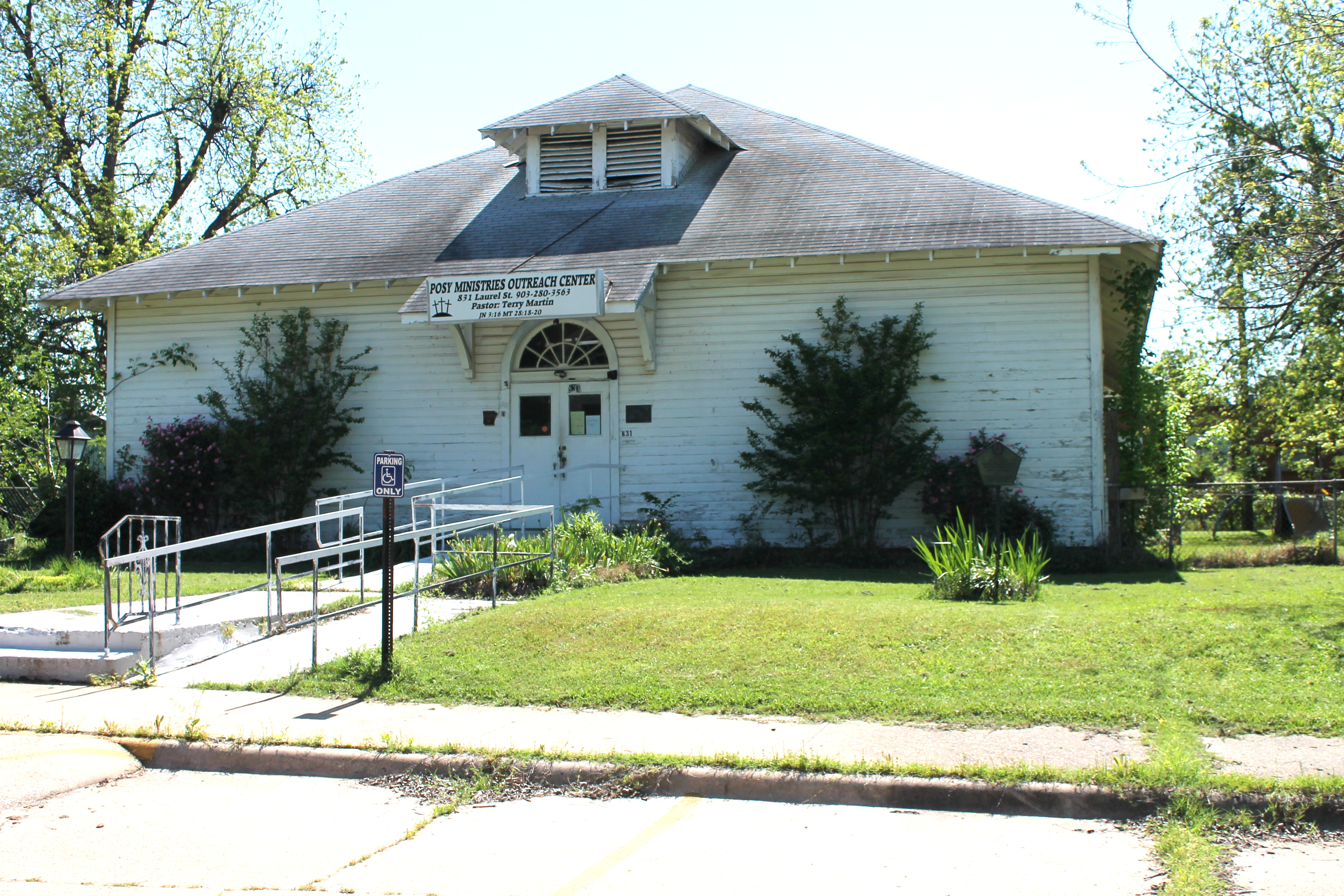

- Location within Arkansas Location within the United States
- Location: 831 Laurel St., Texarkana, Arkansas
- Coordinates: 33°25′48″N 94°2′31″W
- Area: less than one acre
- Built: 1880
- NRHP reference No.: 76000434
- Added to NRHP: July 30, 1976

The Orr School is a historic school building at 831 Laurel Street in Texarkana, Arkansas. It is a single story wood-frame structure, with a hip roof that has exposed rafters. It is clad in white shiplap siding. The interior has a long, narrow hallway dividing classrooms on either side. The school was built c. 1880, and is the only surviving building in Texarkana associated with the life of the noted African-American composer Scott Joplin (1868-1917), the "father of American Ragtime". The building was originally two stories in height, but was reduced to one in 1920, when then hip roof and some of its Craftsman-style window treatment was added. It was purchased from the city by the City Federation of Women's Clubs in 1958.

The building was listed on the National Register of Historic Places in 1976.

== See also ==
- National Register of Historic Places listings in Miller County, Arkansas
