= Canaan Baptist Church (Texarkana, Arkansas) =

Historic church in Arkansas, United States

- U.S. National Register of Historic Places
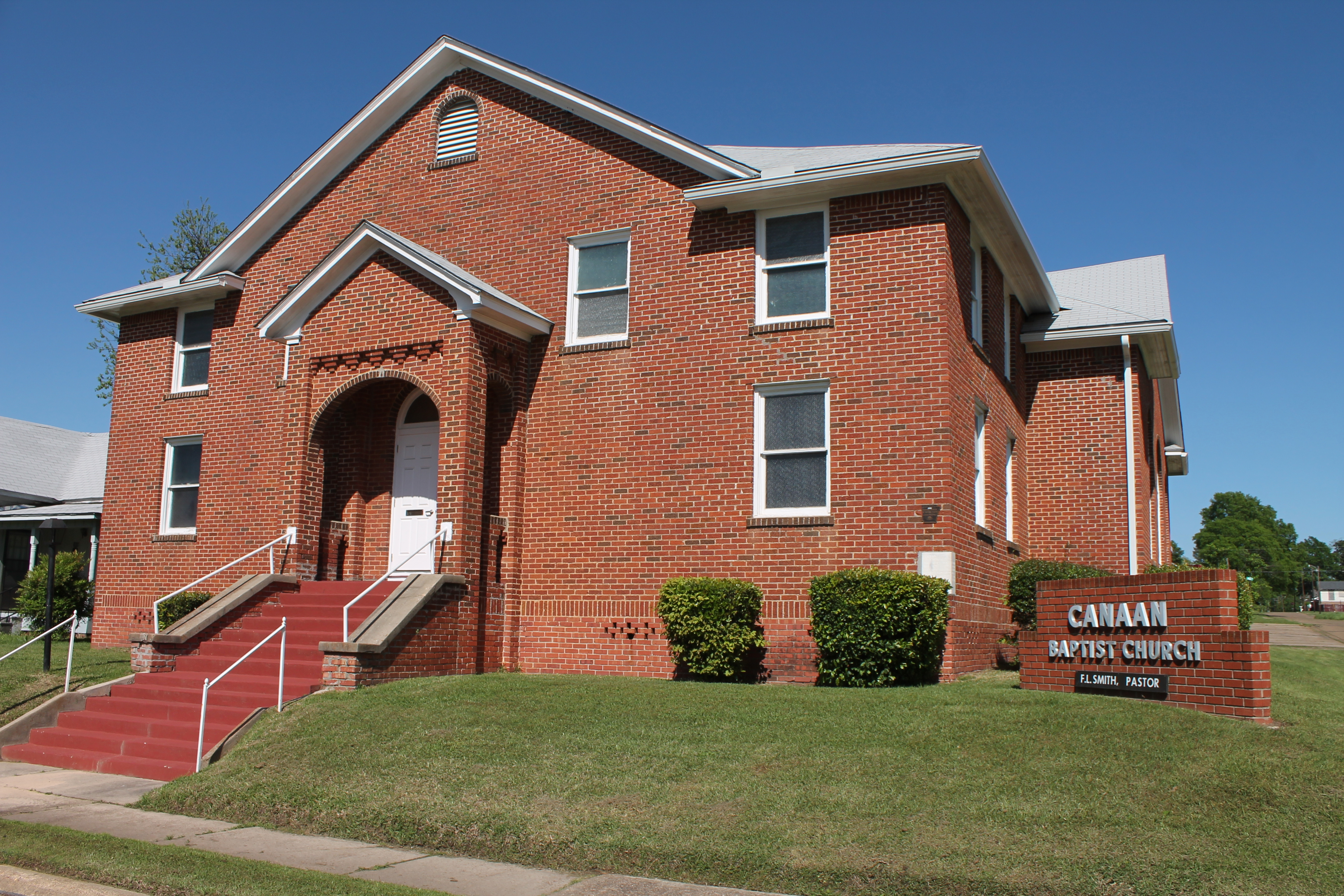

- Location within Arkansas Location within the United States
- Location: Jct. of Laurel and 10th Sts., Texarkana, Arkansas
- Coordinates: 33°25′59″N 94°2′29″W
- Area: less than one acre
- Architect: T.L. Bentley, S.C. Cox
- Architectural style: Colonial Revival, Late Gothic Revival, Other, Vernacular Late 19c Revival
- NRHP reference No.: 90000903
- Added to NRHP: June 14, 1990

The Canaan Baptist Church is a historic church at the junction of Laurel and 10th Streets in Texarkana, Arkansas. The single-story brick church was built in 1929 for an African-American congregation established in 1883. The building was designed by S. C. Cox, and exhibits Colonial Revival styling with some Gothic details, primarily in its pointed-arch windows.

The church was listed on the National Register of Historic Places in 1990.

== See also ==
- National Register of Historic Places listings in Miller County, Arkansas
