= John Clifton House =

Historic house in Arkansas, United States

- U.S. National Register of Historic Places
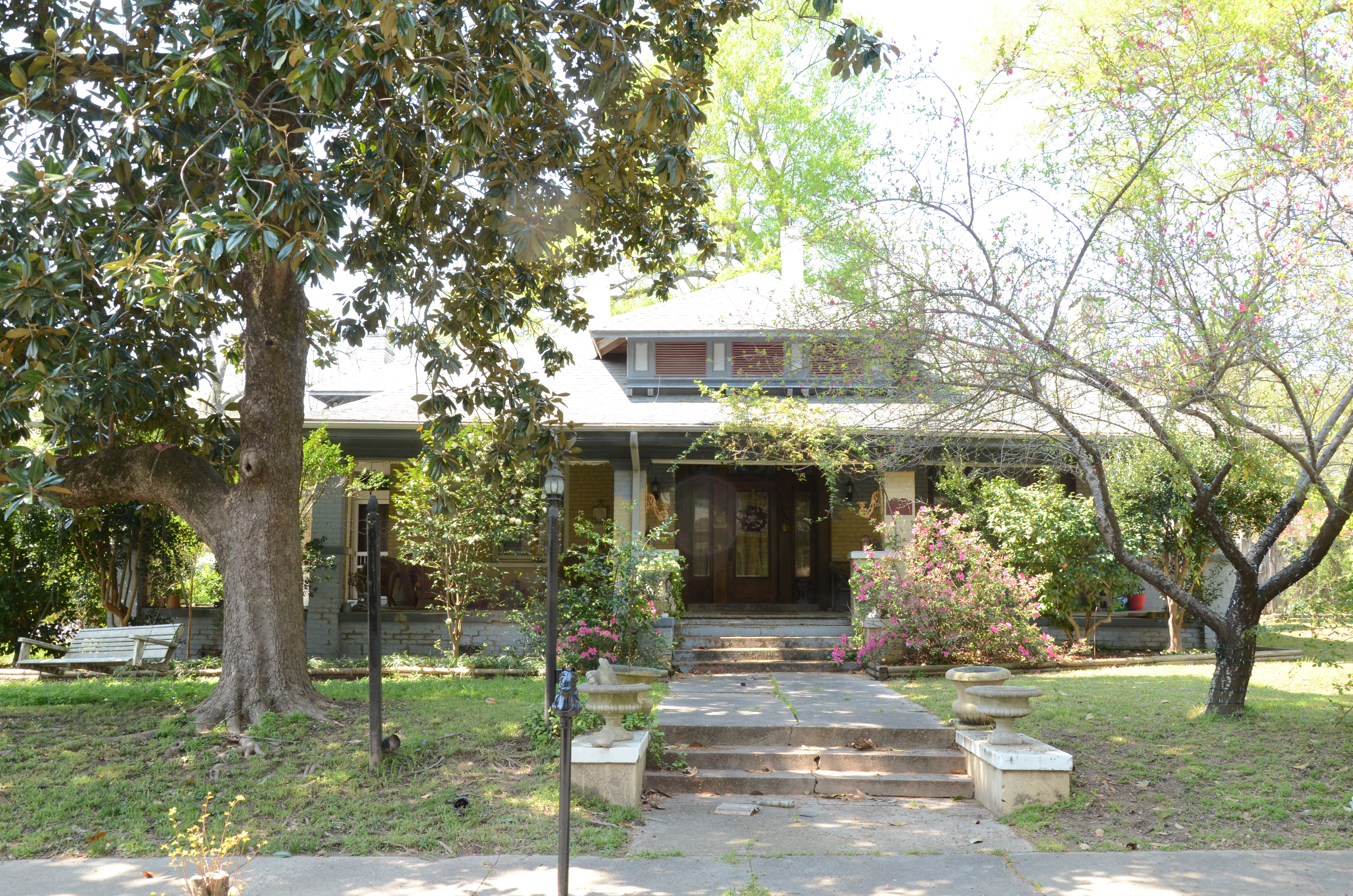

- Location within Arkansas Location within the United States
- Location: 1803 Pecan St., Texarkana, Arkansas
- Coordinates: 33°26′23″N 94°2′14″W
- Area: less than one acre
- Built: 1908
- Architectural style: Prairie School
- NRHP reference No.: 00000608
- Added to NRHP: June 2, 2000

The John Clifton House is a historic house at 1803 Pecan Street in Texarkana, Arkansas, United States.

== Architecture ==
It is a single-story brick structure, with a porch wrapping around the front facade, supported by large square brick piers. It has a low-pitch roof with rafters exposed at the gabled side elevations, and horizontal ribbons of windows. It is a fine local example of the Prairie School of architecture, and the best in the Pleasant Hill neighborhood.

== History ==
The house was built in 1908 for John Dial Clifton and Frances Brewer Clifton, and was a well-known site of social gatherings. Clifton, who worked for an importer, died of tuberculosis in 1934.

The house was listed on the National Register of Historic Places in 2000.

== See also ==
- National Register of Historic Places listings in Miller County, Arkansas
