= Kittrell House =

Historic house in Arkansas, United States

- U.S. National Register of Historic Places
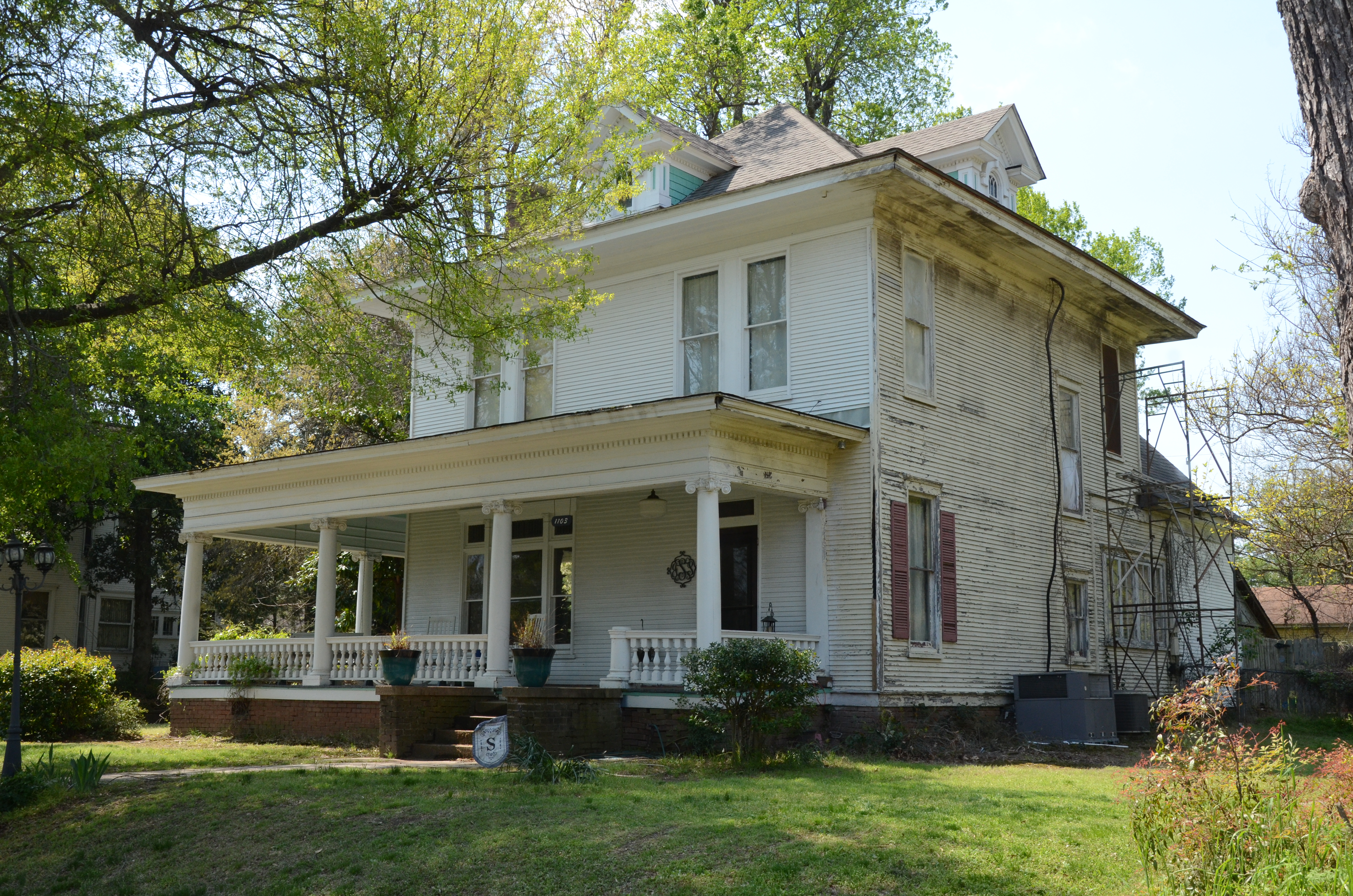

- Location within Arkansas Location within the United States
- Location: 1103 Hickory St., Texarkana, Arkansas
- Coordinates: 33°26′1″N 94°2′11″W
- Area: less than one acre
- Built: 1900
- Architect: Charles L. Thompson
- Architectural style: Colonial Revival
- MPS: Thompson, Charles L., Design Collection TR
- NRHP reference No.: 82000864
- Added to NRHP: December 22, 1982

The Kittrell House is a historic house at 1103 Hickory Street in Texarkana, Arkansas. It is a two-story Foursquare wood-frame house with a hipped roof, set on a high brick foundation. It sits on a terraced corner lot, raised above the sidewalk level by a low wall. A full-width single-story porch extends across the main facade, supported by Ionic columns and with a balustrade of urn-shaped balusters. The house was designed by Charles L. Thompson, a noted Arkansas architect, and built c. 1900–10.

The house was listed on the National Register of Historic Places in 1982.

== See also ==
- National Register of Historic Places listings in Miller County, Arkansas
