= National Register of Historic Places listings in Miller County, Arkansas =

Location of Miller County in Arkansas

This is a list of the National Register of Historic Places listings in Miller County, Arkansas.

This is intended to be a complete list of the properties and districts on the National Register of Historic Places in Miller County, Arkansas, United States. The locations of National Register properties and districts for which the latitude and longitude coordinates are included below, may be seen in a map.

There are 35 properties and districts listed on the National Register in the county, and four former listings.

Contents: Counties in Arkansas
- Arkansas
- Ashley
- Baxter
- Benton
- Boone
- Bradley
- Calhoun
- Carroll
- Chicot
- Clark
- Clay
- Cleburne
- Cleveland
- Columbia
- Conway
- Craighead
- Crawford
- Crittenden
- Cross
- Dallas
- Desha
- Drew
- Faulkner
- Franklin
- Fulton
- Garland
- Grant
- Greene
- Hempstead
- Hot Spring
- Howard
- Independence
- Izard
- Jackson
- Jefferson
- Johnson
- Lafayette
- Lawrence
- Lee
- Lincoln
- Little River
- Logan
- Lonoke
- Madison
- Marion
- Miller
- Mississippi
- Monroe
- Montgomery
- Nevada
- Newton
- Ouachita
- Perry
- Phillips
- Pike
- Poinsett
- Polk
- Pope
- Prairie
- Pulaski (Little Rock)
- Randolph
- St. Francis
- Saline
- Scott
- Searcy
- Sebastian
- Sevier
- Sharp
- Stone
- Union
- Van Buren
- Washington
- White
- Woodruff
- Yell

This National Park Service list is complete through NPS recent listings posted January 9, 2026.

== Current listings ==
| | Name on the Register | Image | Date listed | Location | City or town | Description |
|---|---|---|---|---|---|---|
| 1 | Wallace Adams Service Station | Wallace Adams Service Station | August 1, 2008 (#08000726) | 523 E. 3rd St. 33°26′39″N 94°02′17″W | Texarkana | |
| 2 | Patrick J. Ahern House | Patrick J. Ahern House | January 20, 2005 (#04001508) | 403 Laurel St. 33°25′35″N 94°02′23″W | Texarkana | |
| 3 | Averitt House | Averitt House | July 24, 1992 (#92000958) | Western side of U.S. Route 71, 6 miles south of Texarkana; 33°20′50″N 93°57′51″W | Mount Pleasant | |
| 4 | Beech Street Brick Street | Beech Street Brick Street | May 22, 2007 (#07000438) | Beech St. between 14th and 24th Sts. 33°26′50″N 94°02′21″W | Texarkana | |
| 5 | Beech Street Historic District | Beech Street Historic District | January 21, 2010 (#09001254) | Roughly Beech St. between 14th and 23rd Sts. 33°26′26″N 94°02′22″W | Texarkana | |
| 6 | Bottoms House | Bottoms House | June 8, 1982 (#82002124) | 500 Hickory; 33°25′44″N 94°02′05″W | Texarkana | |
| 7 | Buhrman-Pharr Hardware Company Historic District | Buhrman-Pharr Hardware Company Historic District | September 24, 2004 (#04001045) | 610 and 620 E 3rd St. 33°25′36″N 94°02′15″W | Texarkana | |
| 8 | Canaan Baptist Church | Canaan Baptist Church | June 14, 1990 (#90000903) | Junction of Laurel and 10th Sts. 33°25′59″N 94°02′29″W | Texarkana | |
| 9 | John Clifton House | John Clifton House | June 2, 2000 (#00000608) | 1803 Pecan St. 33°26′23″N 94°02′14″W | Texarkana | |
| 10 | Confederate Section-Old Rondo Cemetery | Confederate Section-Old Rondo Cemetery | September 22, 2004 (#04001029) | 1612 Smith Rd. 33°26′47″N 93°58′03″W | Rondo | |
| 11 | Cotton Belt Railroad Office Building | Cotton Belt Railroad Office Building | August 1, 2008 (#08000727) | 312 E. Broad St. 33°25′21″N 94°02′26″W | Texarkana | |
| 12 | Crenshaw Site | | January 26, 1994 (#93001521) | Address Restricted | Hervey | |
| 13 | Dean House | Dean House | December 12, 1976 (#76000433) | 1520 Beech St. 33°26′19″N 94°02′19″W | Texarkana | |
| 14 | East Broad Street Historic District | East Broad Street Historic District | August 1, 2008 (#08000729) | 100 block of E. Broad St. 33°25′18″N 94°02′32″W | Texarkana | |
| 15 | Augustus M. Garrison House | Augustus M. Garrison House | March 25, 1982 (#82002126) | 600 Pecan St. 33°25′45″N 94°02′11″W | Texarkana | |
| 16 | Hopkins Feed and Seed Store | Hopkins Feed and Seed Store | August 1, 2008 (#08000728) | 301 E. 3rd St. 33°25′24″N 94°02′29″W | Texarkana | |
| 17 | Kiblah School | Kiblah School | November 20, 1989 (#88003210) | Route 1; 33°03′12″N 93°52′01″W | Doddridge | |
| 18 | Kittrell House | Kittrell House | December 22, 1982 (#82000864) | 1103 Hickory St. 33°26′01″N 94°02′11″W | Texarkana | |
| 19 | Miller County Courthouse | Miller County Courthouse | May 29, 1998 (#98000578) | 400 Laurel St. 33°25′35″N 94°01′38″W | Texarkana | |
| 20 | Mullins Court | Mullins Court | January 29, 2007 (#06001313) | 605 Hickory St. 33°25′53″N 94°02′08″W | Texarkana | |
| 21 | Charles J. Neif House | Charles J. Neif House | August 5, 1994 (#94000822) | 1410 Pecan St. 33°26′12″N 94°02′13″W | Texarkana | |
| 22 | Nix Creek Bridge | | January 4, 2021 (#100007323) | US 71 over Nix Cr. 33°25′22″N 94°01′50″W | Texarkana | |
| 23 | Old Arkansas 2-Mayton Segment | Old Arkansas 2-Mayton Segment | May 16, 2008 (#08000440) | County Roads 122 and 123; 33°23′43″N 93°44′40″W | Garland | Part of Arkansas Highway 2 |
| 24 | Old US 67, Mandeville | Old US 67, Mandeville | January 21, 2004 (#03001458) | Highway 296, County Road 138, and southeast of the current U.S. Route 67; 33°29′16″N 93°57′35″W | Mandeville | |
| 25 | Orr School | Orr School | July 30, 1976 (#76000434) | 831 Laurel St. 33°25′48″N 94°02′31″W | Texarkana | |
| 26 | Porter-McClure Paint Company Store | | May 5, 2025 (#100011830) | 204 E. Broad Street; 33°25′19″N 94°02′30″W | Texarkana | |
| 27 | Ritchie Grocery Building | Ritchie Grocery Building | June 14, 1990 (#90000900) | Junction of Front and Olive Sts. 33°25′15″N 94°02′29″W | Texarkana | |
| 28 | Swift Building | Swift Building | August 1, 2008 (#08000725) | 410 E. Broad St. 33°25′23″N 94°02′22″W | Texarkana | |
| 29 | Texarkana Union Station | Texarkana Union Station | November 19, 1978 (#78000611) | State Line and Front St. 33°25′12″N 94°02′33″W | Texarkana | Extends into Bowie County, Texas |
| 30 | Texarkana US Post Office and Courthouse | Texarkana US Post Office and Courthouse | March 24, 2000 (#00000245) | 5th St. and State Line Ave. 33°25′30″N 94°02′34″W | Texarkana | Extends into Bowie County, Texas |
| 31 | Texarkana, Arkansas, Municipal Building | Texarkana, Arkansas, Municipal Building | January 21, 2004 (#03001456) | Walnut and 3rd Sts. 33°25′25″N 94°02′22″W | Texarkana | |
| 32 | J.K. Wadley House | J.K. Wadley House | February 12, 1999 (#99000155) | 618 Pecan St. 33°25′47″N 94°02′11″W | Texarkana | |
| 33 | Alvah Horace Whitmarsh House | Alvah Horace Whitmarsh House | August 29, 1980 (#80000778) | 711 Pecan St. 33°25′57″N 94°02′26″W | Texarkana | |
| 34 | Williams-Arnold-Staley House | Williams-Arnold-Staley House | November 3, 2023 (#100009342) | 1005 Pecan St. 33°25′59″N 94°02′15″W | Texarkana | |
| 35 | Wynn-Price House | Wynn-Price House | January 23, 1992 (#90001950) | Price St. 33°21′48″N 93°43′24″W | Garland | |

== Former listings ==
| | Name on the Register | Image | Date listed | Date removed | Location | City or town | Description |
|---|---|---|---|---|---|---|---|
| 1 | First Methodist Church | | December 22, 1982 (#82000863) | January 14, 2002 | 400 E. 6th | Texarkana | |
| 2 | Claude Foulke House | Claude Foulke House | April 22, 1982 (#82002125) | September 2, 2022 | 501 Pecan St. 33°25′41″N 94°02′09″W | Texarkana | Demolished in March, 2022. |
| 3 | Dr. J. A. Lightfoot House | | June 30, 1995 (#95000792) | January 14, 2002 | 422 Pecan Street | Texarkana | |
| 4 | Red River Bridge | Red River Bridge | April 4, 1990 (#90000517) | August 11, 1999 | over the Red River | Garland | Replaced in 1990. Historic Bridges of Arkansas MPS |

== See also ==
- List of National Historic Landmarks in Arkansas
- National Register of Historic Places listings in Arkansas
