= Kiblah School =

- U.S. National Register of Historic Places
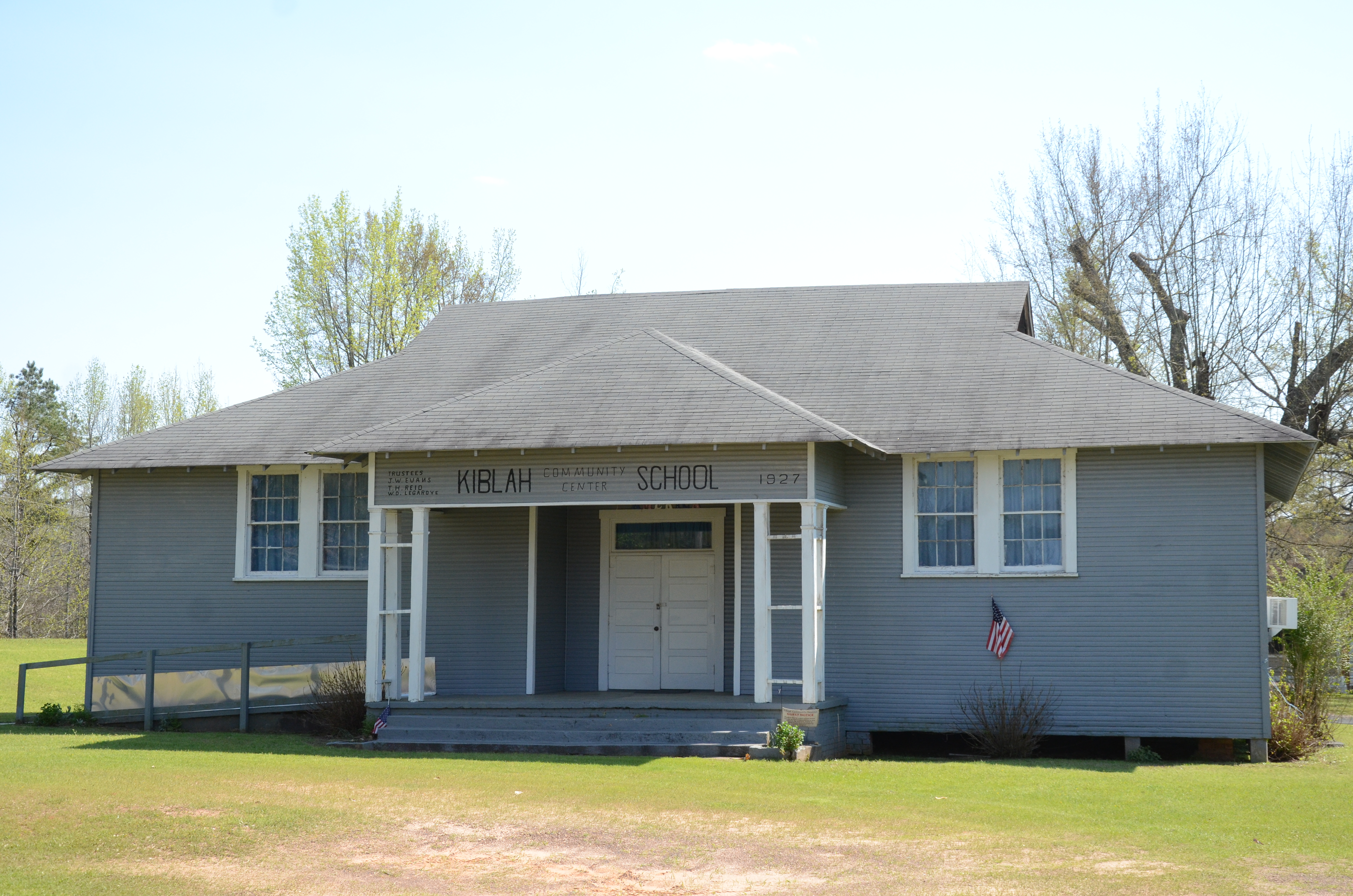

- Location within Arkansas Location within the United States
- Nearest city: Doddridge, Arkansas
- Coordinates: 33°3′12″N 93°52′1″W
- Area: less than one acre
- Built: 1927
- Architect: Rosenwald
- Architectural style: Bungalow/craftsman
- NRHP reference No.: 88003210
- Added to NRHP: November 20, 1989

The Kiblah School is a historic school building in rural Miller County, Arkansas. It is located southeast of Doddridge, at the junction of County Roads 4 and 192, between United States Route 71 and the Red River. The building is a single-story L-shaped wood-frame structure, topped by a gable-on-hip roof. It has modest Craftsman styling, with some Greek Revival influences. The main entrance is sheltered by a hip-roofed porch supported by Craftsman-style columns. It has a transom window reminiscent of Greek Revival doorways. The school was built in 1927 with funding from the Rosenwald Fund (although it was not built to a standard Rosenwald plan), and was intended to serve the African-American community of Kiblah, which was established after the American Civil War by former slaves from a Louisiana plantation.

The building was listed on the National Register of Historic Places in 1989.

== See also ==
- National Register of Historic Places listings in Miller County, Arkansas
