= J. K. Wadley House =

Historic house in Arkansas, United States

- J.K. Wadley House
- U.S. National Register of Historic Places
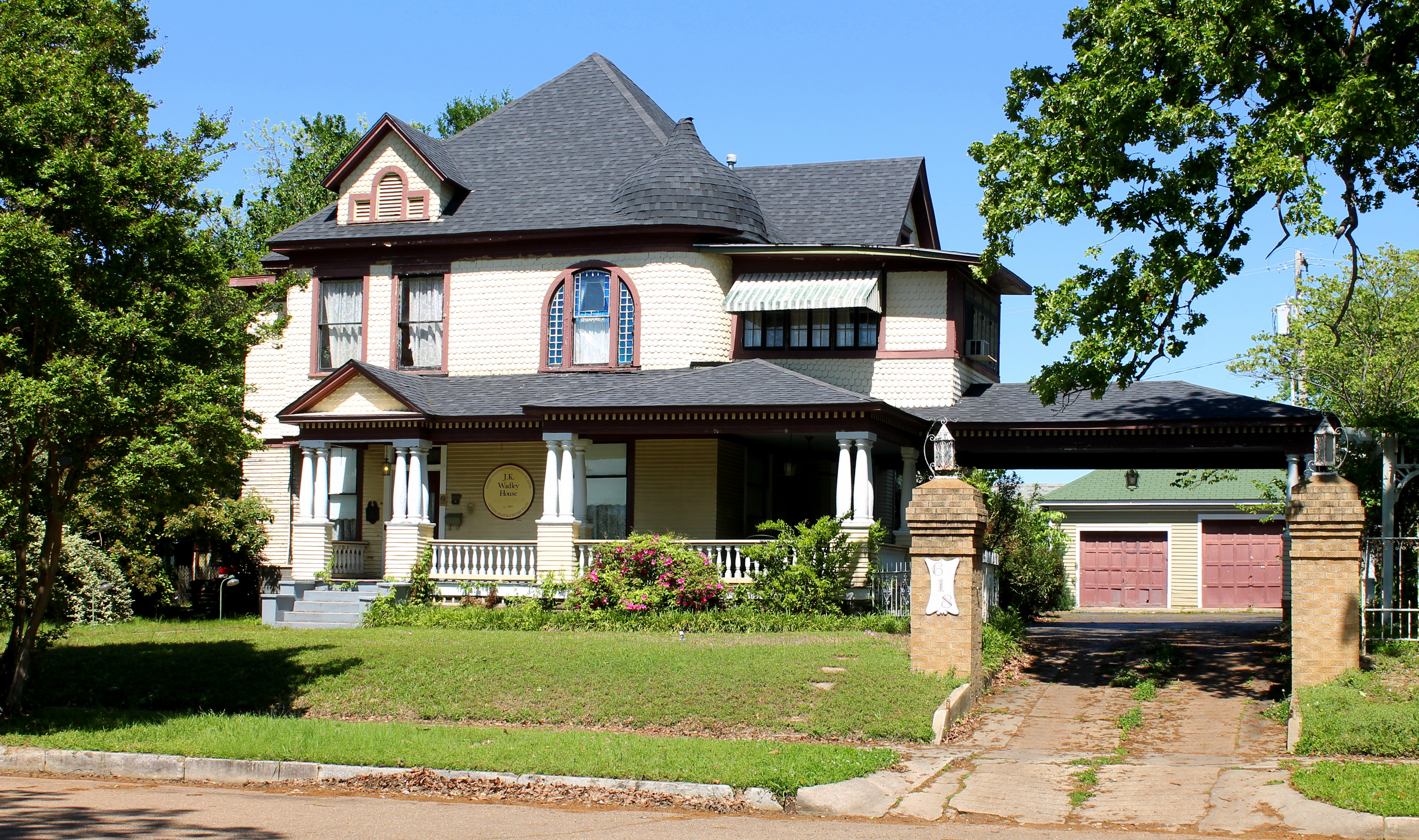

- Location within Arkansas Location within the United States
- Location: 618 Pecan Street, Texarkana, Arkansas
- Coordinates: 33°25′47″N 94°2′11″W
- Area: less than one acre
- Built: 1895
- Architect: Tully Tupper
- Architectural style: Queen Anne
- NRHP reference No.: 99000155
- Added to NRHP: February 12, 1999

The J. K. Wadley House is a historic house located at 618 Pecan Street in Texarkana, Arkansas.

== Description and history ==
Built in 1895, it is a two-story, wood-framed structure, and is notable as a fine local example of the Free Classical type of Queen Anne styling. It is also locally significant as being the longtime home of John Keener Wadley, a lumber, railroad, and oil baron listed as one of the wealthiest men in the United States. The house features a wraparound porch with a pedimented gable, supported by grouped columns. The exterior is finished in clapboarding on the lower level and decorative cut shingles on the upper level. A low onion-domed turret rises from the southern corner.

The house was listed on the National Register of Historic Places on February 12, 1999. It currently functions as a bed and breakfast.

== See also ==
- Augustus M. Garrison House, also part of the Wadley B&B, 600 Pecan Street
- National Register of Historic Places listings in Miller County, Arkansas
