= Augustus M. Garrison House =

Historic house in Arkansas, United States

- U.S. National Register of Historic Places
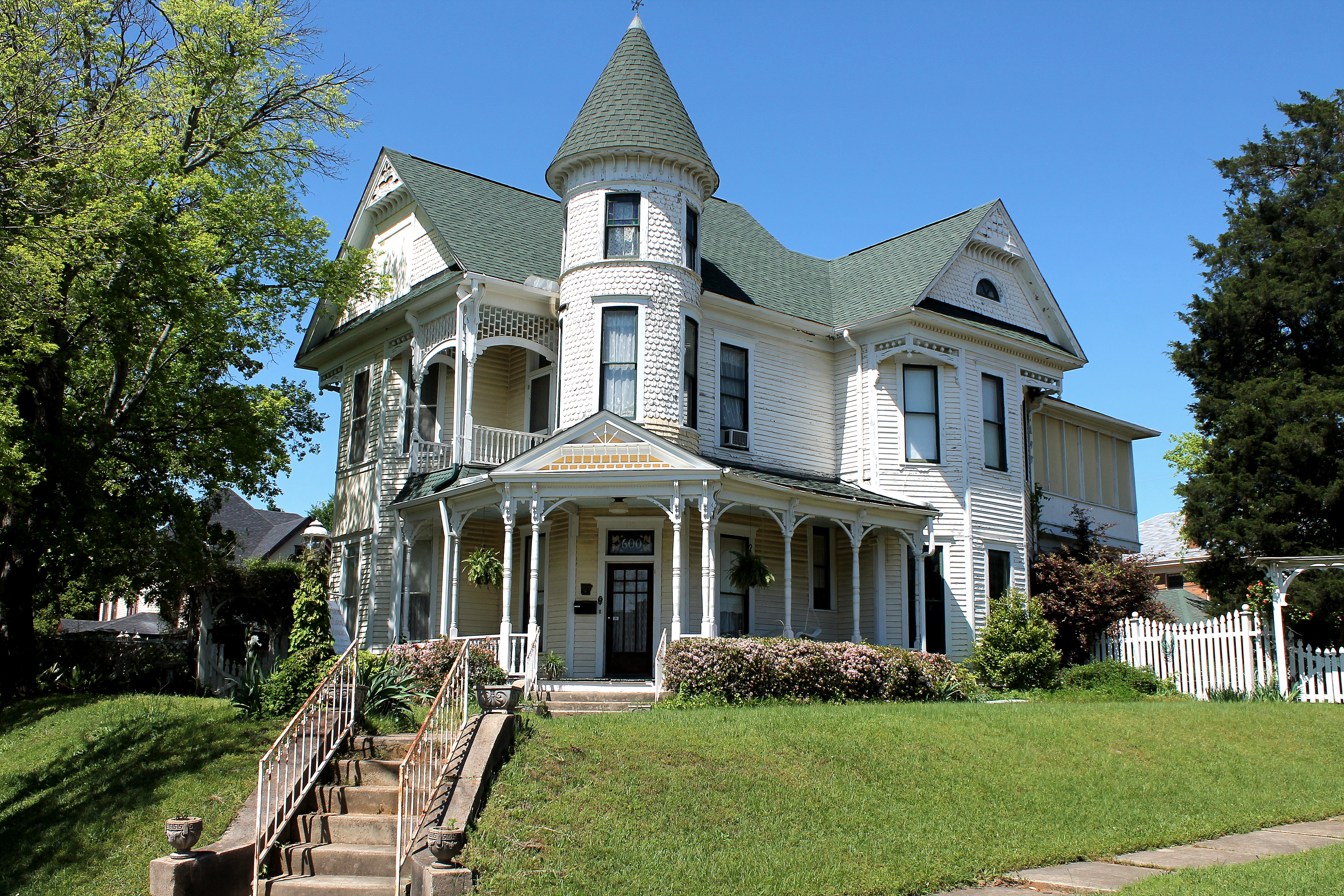

- Location within Arkansas Location within the United States
- Location: 600 Pecan Street, Texarkana, Arkansas
- Coordinates: 33°25′45″N 94°2′11″W
- Area: less than one acre
- Built: 1895; 131 years ago
- Architectural style: Queen Anne, Queen Anne-Eastlake
- NRHP reference No.: 82002126
- Added to NRHP: March 25, 1982; 44 years ago

The Augustus M. Garrison House is a historic house located in Texarkana, Arkansas.

== Description and history ==
Built in 1895, the 2 1/2-story, wood-frame house is notable as one of the city's finest turn-of-the-century Queen Anne style houses. It features the irregular massing, typical of the style, with a single-story wraparound porch with delicate spindled woodwork, and a three-story circular tower topped by a conical roof. The house was built by Augustus M. Garrison, a lawyer, and remained in his family into the 21st century.

The house was listed on the National Register of Historic Places on March 25, 1982. It currently functions as part of the House of Wadley Bed and Breakfast Inn.

== See also ==
- J.K. Wadley House, also part of the Wadley B&B, 618 Pecan Street
- National Register of Historic Places listings in Miller County, Arkansas
