= Beach Street =

Beach Street may refer to:

- Beach Street (Manhattan)
- Beach Street, Fremantle, Australia
- Beach Street, George Town, Penang
- Beach Street Records

== See also ==
- Beach Road (disambiguation)
- Beech Street (disambiguation)
- Streets Beach
