= East Broad Street Historic District (Texarkana, Arkansas) =

Historic district in Arkansas, United States

- U.S. National Register of Historic Places
- U.S. Historic district
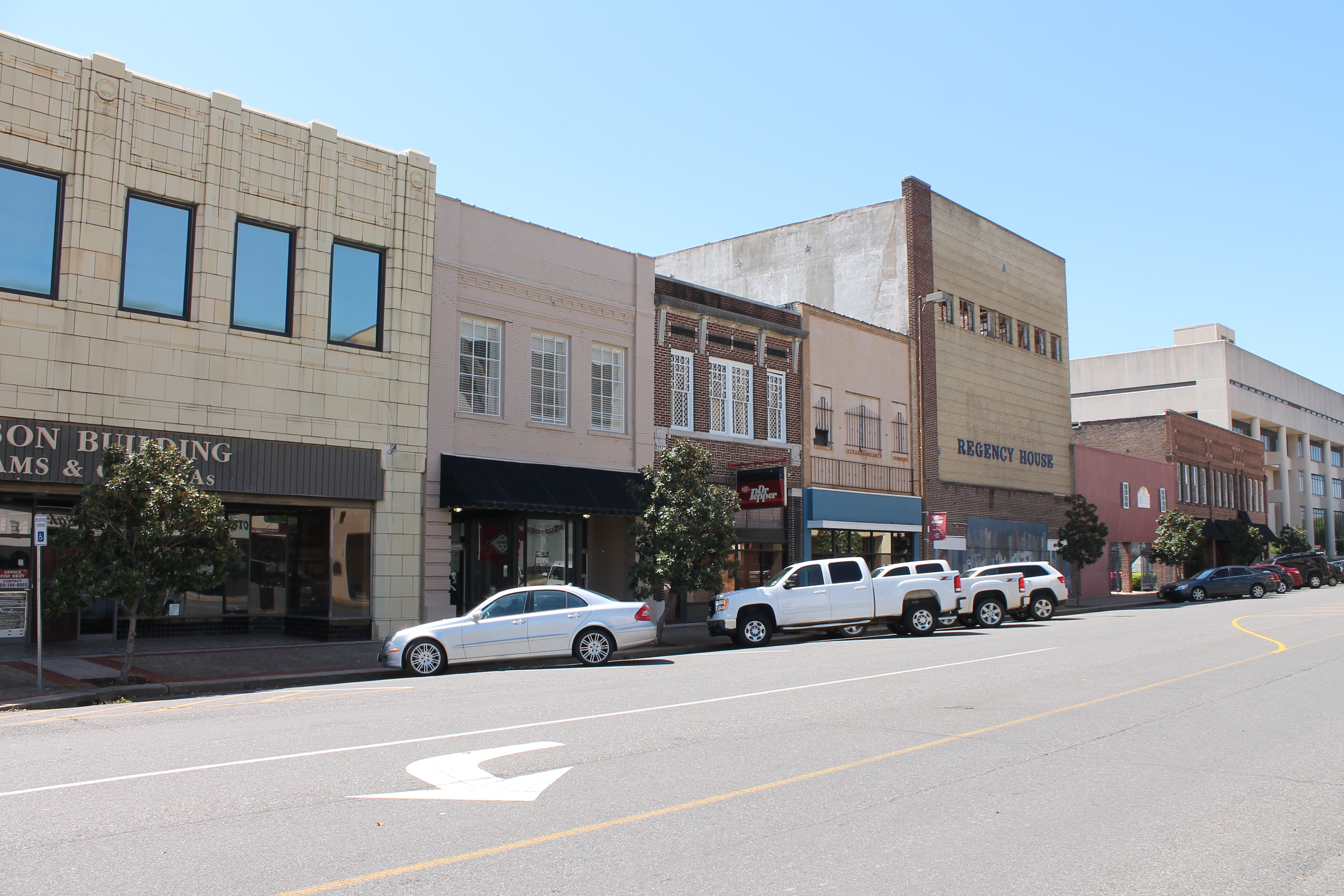

- Location within Arkansas Location within the United States
- Location: 100 block E. Broad St., Texarkana, Arkansas
- Coordinates: 33°25′24″N 94°2′33″W
- Area: less than one acre
- Built: 1886
- Architectural style: Italianate, Early Commercial
- MPS: Historic Buildings of Texarkana, Arkansas, MPS
- NRHP reference No.: 08000729
- Added to NRHP: August 1, 2008

The East Broad Street Historic District encompasses a city block of historic commercial buildings in Texarkana, Arkansas. The district includes all of the buildings on the 100 block of East Broad Street. Most of the fifteen buildings in the district were built before 1920, during Texarkana's major period of growth after the arrival of the railroad. Broad Street, just one block from the railroad, quickly became its economic center. The oldest building is the O'Dwyer and Ahern Building at 110 East Broad Street, a three-story brick-faced building constructed c. 1886.

The district was listed on the National Register of Historic Places in 2008.

== See also ==
- National Register of Historic Places listings in Miller County, Arkansas
