= Old Rondo Cemetery =

Historic cemetery in Arkansas, United States

- Confederate Section-Old Rondo Cemetery
- U.S. National Register of Historic Places
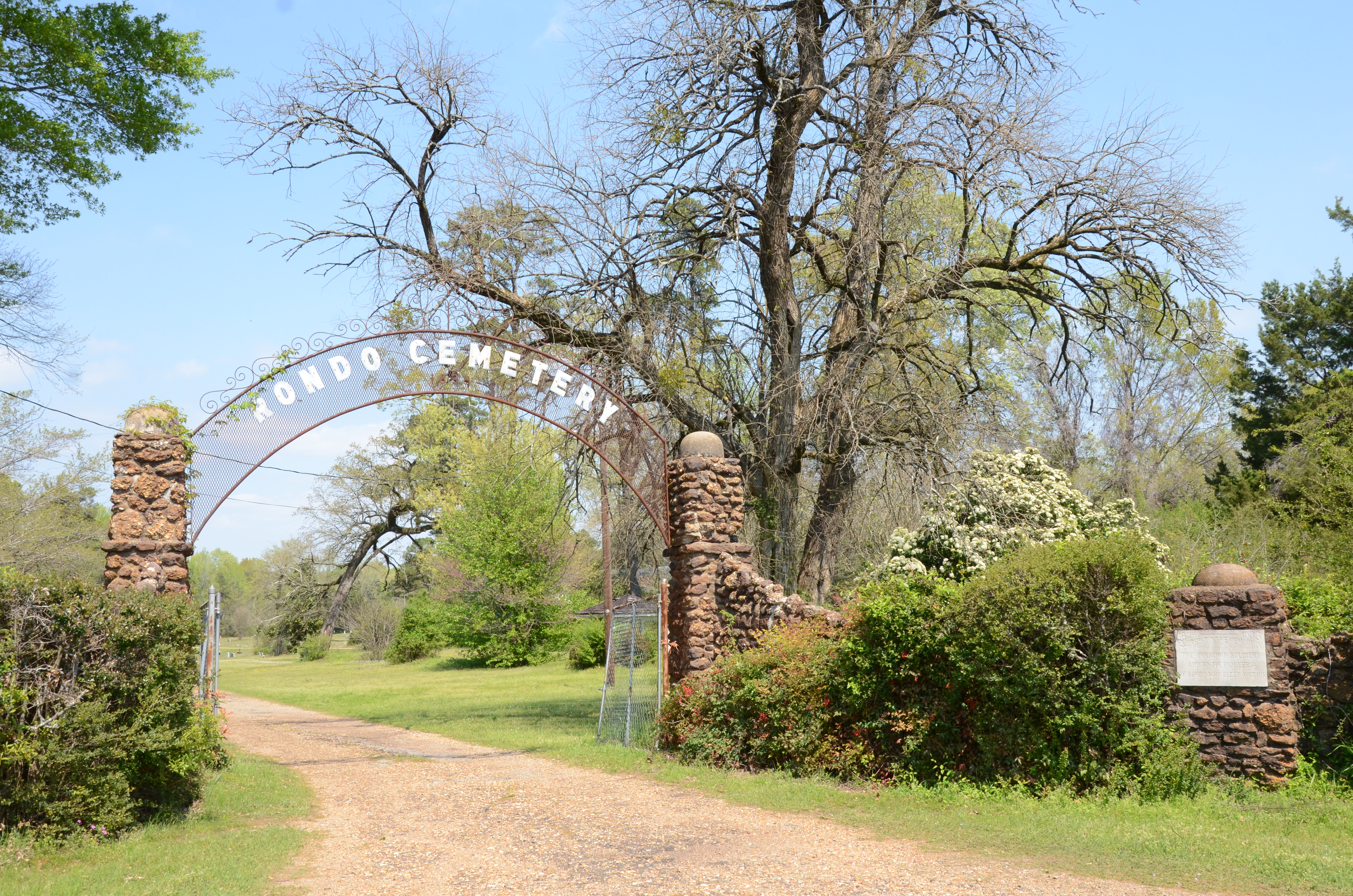

- Location within Arkansas Location within the United States
- Location: 1612 Smith Rd., Rondo, Arkansas
- Coordinates: 33°26′47″N 93°58′3″W
- Area: less than one acre
- Built: 1862
- MPS: Civil War Commemorative Sculpture MPS
- NRHP reference No.: 04001029
- Added to NRHP: September 22, 2004

The Old Rondo Cemetery is located at the junction of McClure Road (County Road 125) and Cobb Lane in Rondo, a small community in Miller County just northeast of Texarkana, Arkansas. The cemetery is best known for the burial site at its center, where the remains of 85 Confederate Army soldiers are buried. In 1862, during the Union Army advance on Little Rock, Confederate troops stationed at Rondo were swept up in a measles epidemic. The 19th Texas Infantry Regiment had seven companies stationed at Rondo, and most of the dead came from its ranks. The 85 dead were disinterred from their original graves and reburied in the Rondo Cemetery after the war. In 1931 the Texarkana chapter of the United Daughters of the Confederacy received federal funding for the purchase of the plot and the placement of memorial markers. There are 17 markers, one for every five of the unknown soldiers, as well as a sandstone monument placed in 1962 and a historical marker placed in the 1990s on the plot, which is set off from the rest of the cemetery by a low concrete boundary wall.

The Confederate section of the cemetery was listed on the National Register of Historic Places in 2004.

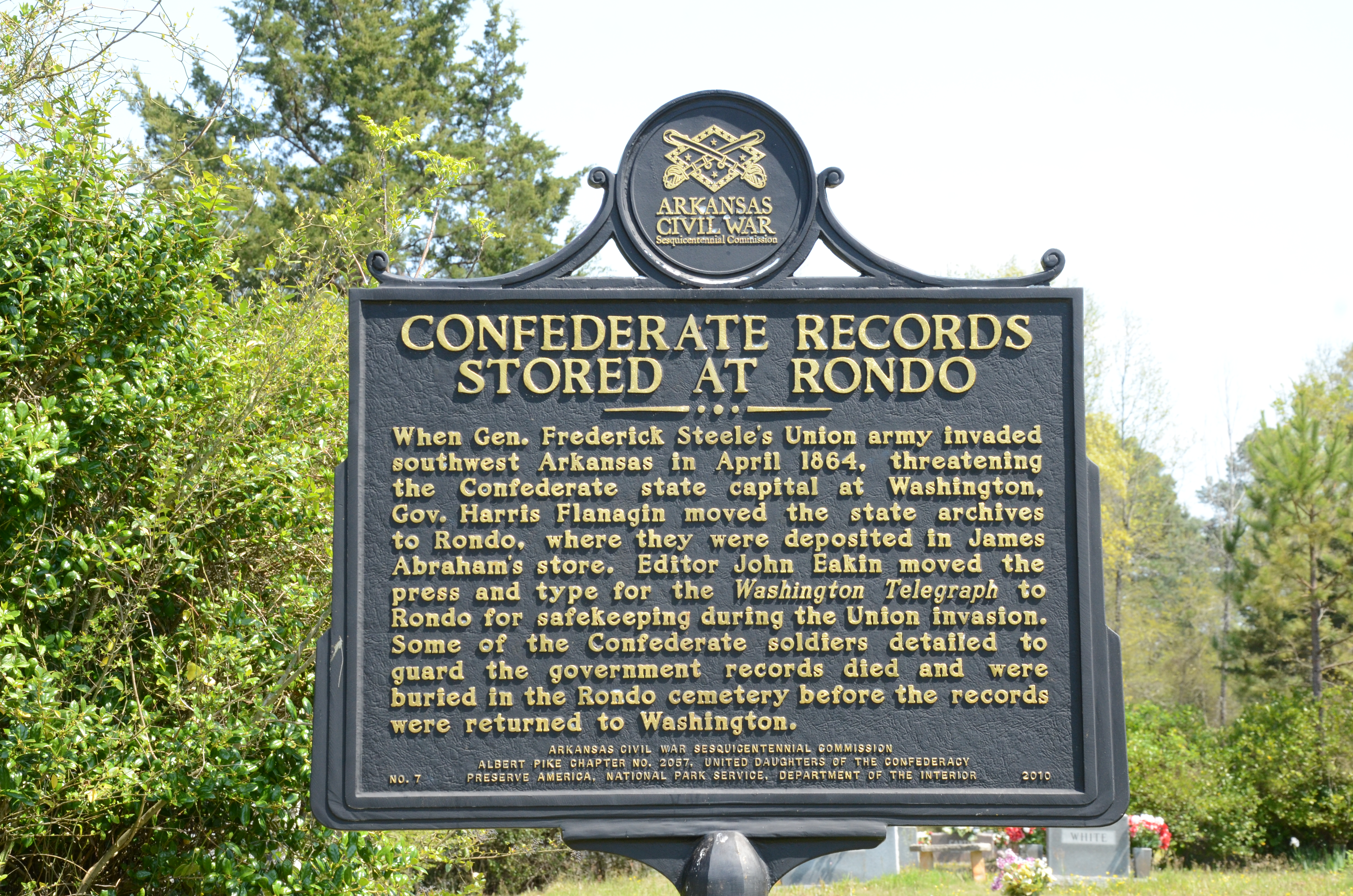
1

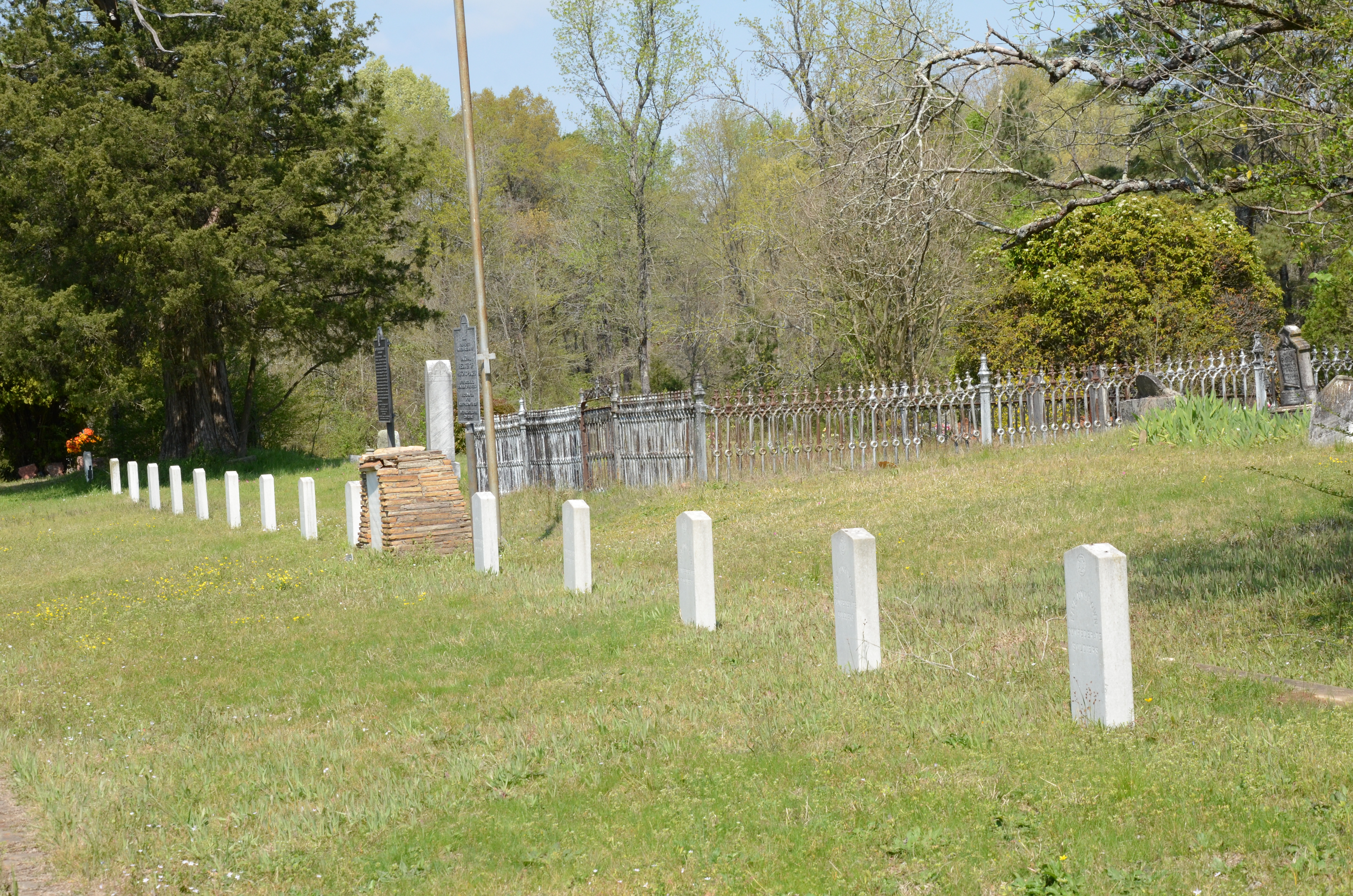
2

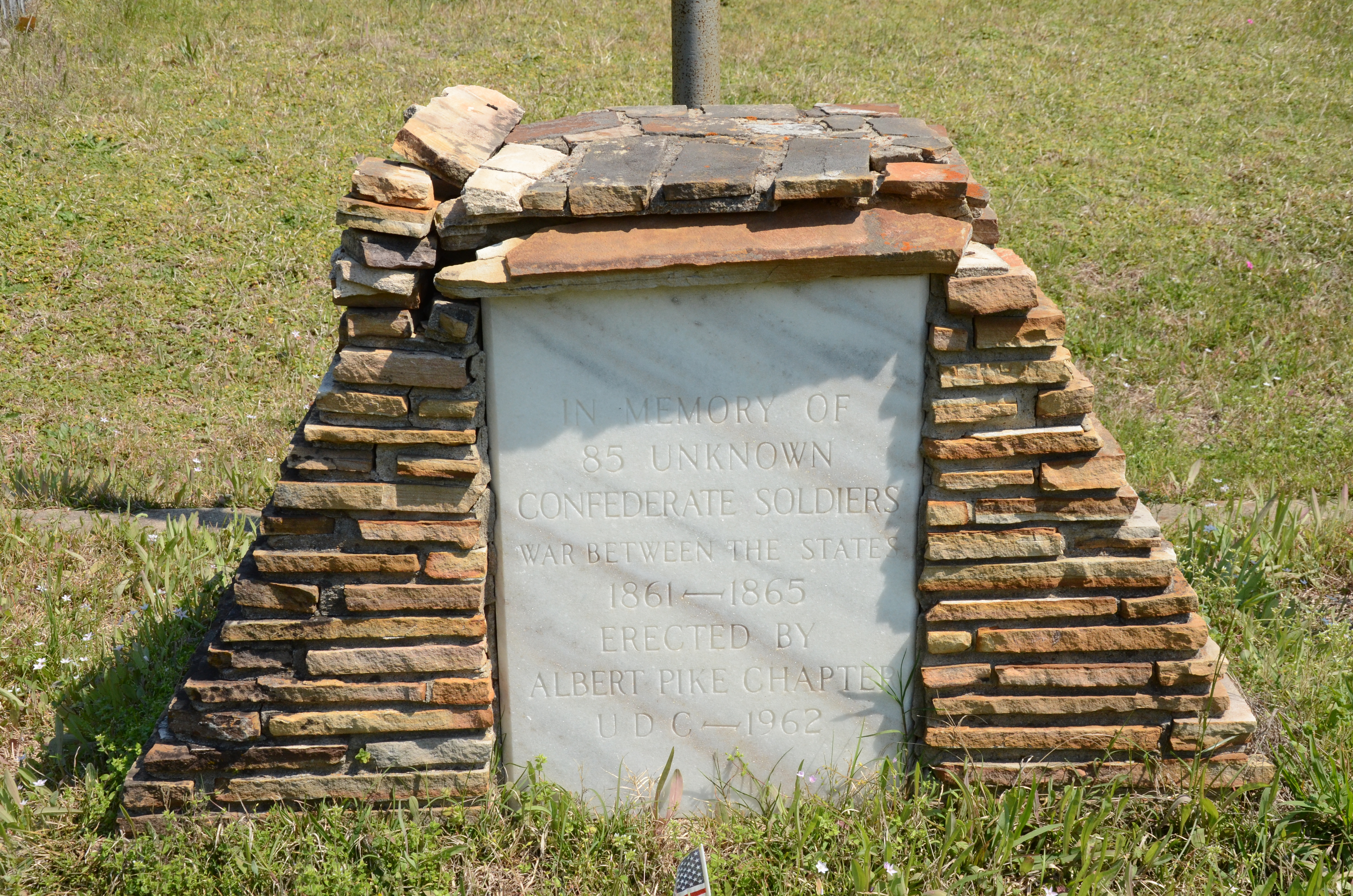
3

== See also ==
- National Register of Historic Places listings in Miller County, Arkansas
