= Swift Building =

- U.S. National Register of Historic Places
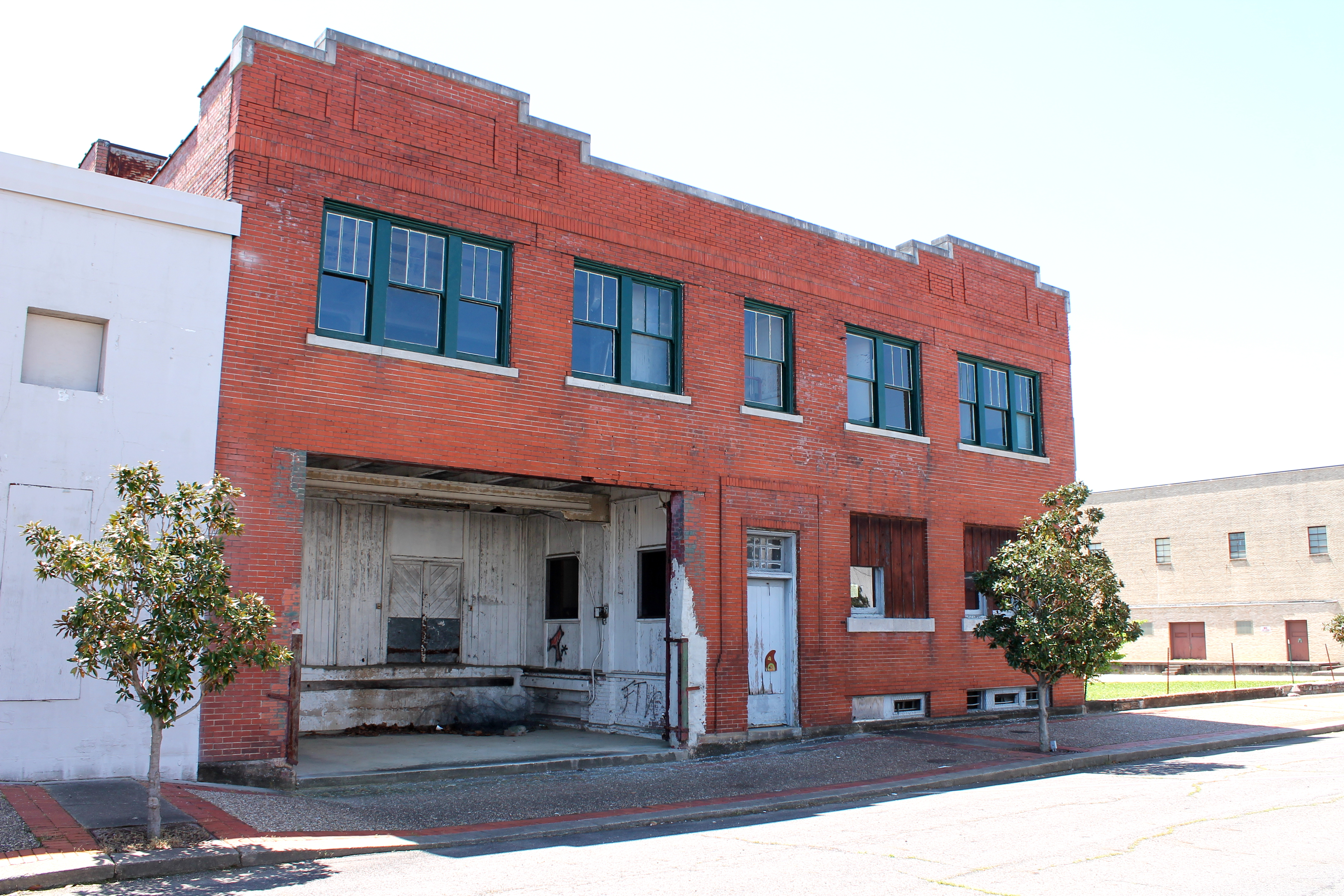

- Location within Arkansas Location within the United States
- Location: 410 E. Broad St., Texarkana, Arkansas
- Coordinates: 33°25′29″N 94°2′20″W
- Area: less than one acre
- Built: 1920
- Architectural style: Early Commercial
- MPS: Historic Buildings of Texarkana, Arkansas, MPS
- NRHP reference No.: 08000725
- Added to NRHP: August 1, 2008

The Swift Building is a historic commercial building at 410 East Broad Street in Texarkana, Arkansas. It is a two-story brick building, with a distinctive brick parapet topped by cast concrete. The main facade has a central doorway, with a series of three sash windows on the right and a recessed loading bay on the left. The building was built c. 1920 by the Swift Meat Company, and is a well-preserved example of a meat packing facility from the period, and a good example of vernacular commercial architecture.

The building was listed on the National Register of Historic Places in 2008.

== See also ==
- National Register of Historic Places listings in Miller County, Arkansas
