= Dean House (Texarkana, Arkansas) =

Historic house in Arkansas

- U.S. National Register of Historic Places
- U.S. Historic district – Contributing property
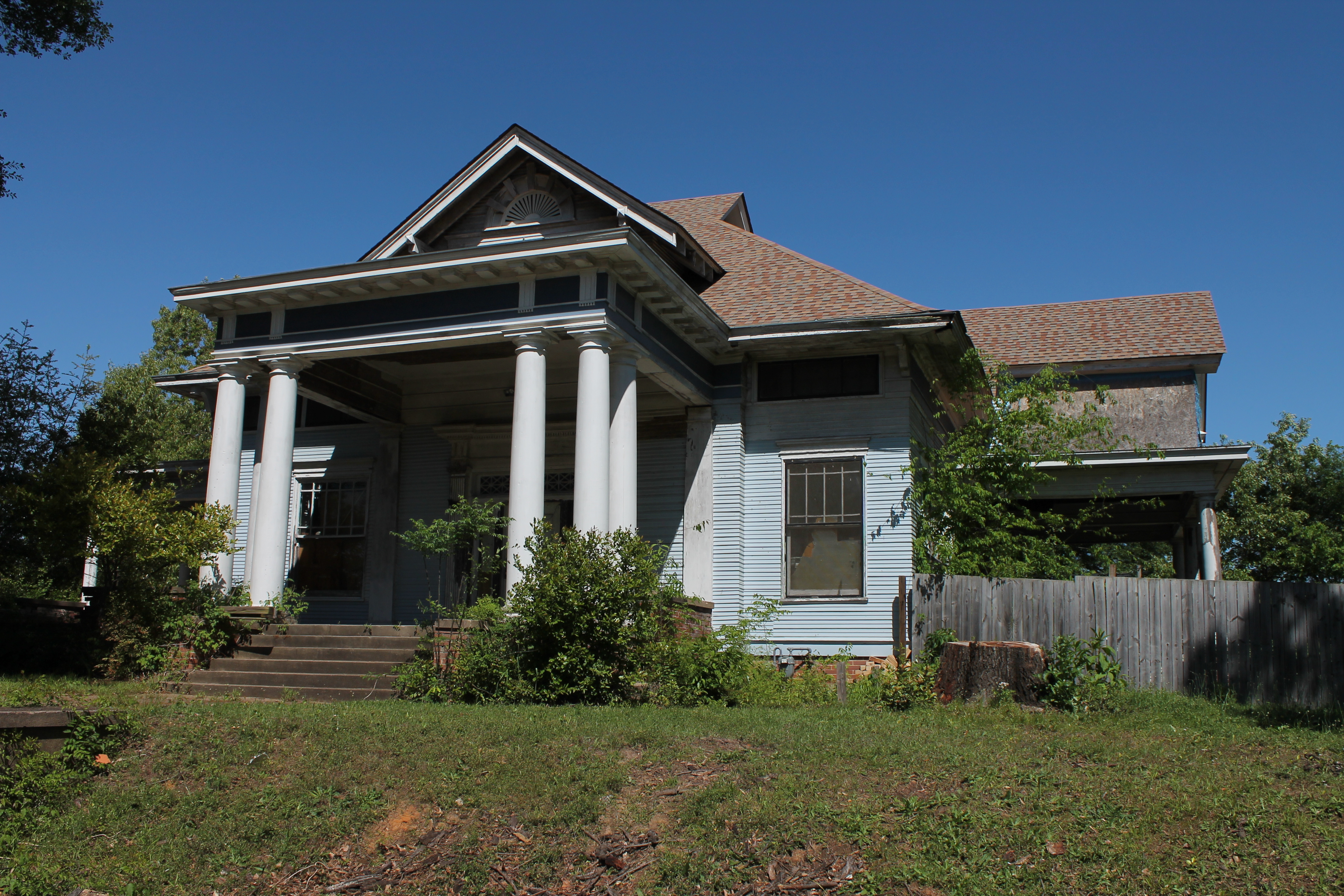

- Location within Arkansas Location within the United States
- Location: 1520 Beech St., Texarkana, Arkansas
- Coordinates: 33°26′19″N 94°2′19″W
- Area: less than one acre
- Built: 1911
- Architect: Witt & Seibert
- Architectural style: Colonial Revival
- Part of: Beech Street Historic District (ID09001254)
- NRHP reference No.: 76000433

Significant dates
- Added to NRHP: December 12, 1976
- Designated CP: January 21, 2010

The Dean House is a historic house at 1520 Beech Street in Texarkana, Arkansas. It is a two-story wood-frame house, built in 1911 for Thomas Mercer Dean, a local farmer and lumberman. Its principal distinguishing feature is its large Colonial Revival portico, with paired two-story Tuscan columns supporting an elaborate entablature. Porches wrap around the north and east sides of the house, and there is a porte-cochère at the southern corner.

The house was listed on the National Register of Historic Places in 1976, and it was included in the Beech Street Historic District in 2010.

== See also ==
- National Register of Historic Places listings in Miller County, Arkansas
