= Beech Street Brick Street =

- U.S. National Register of Historic Places
- U.S. Historic district – Contributing property
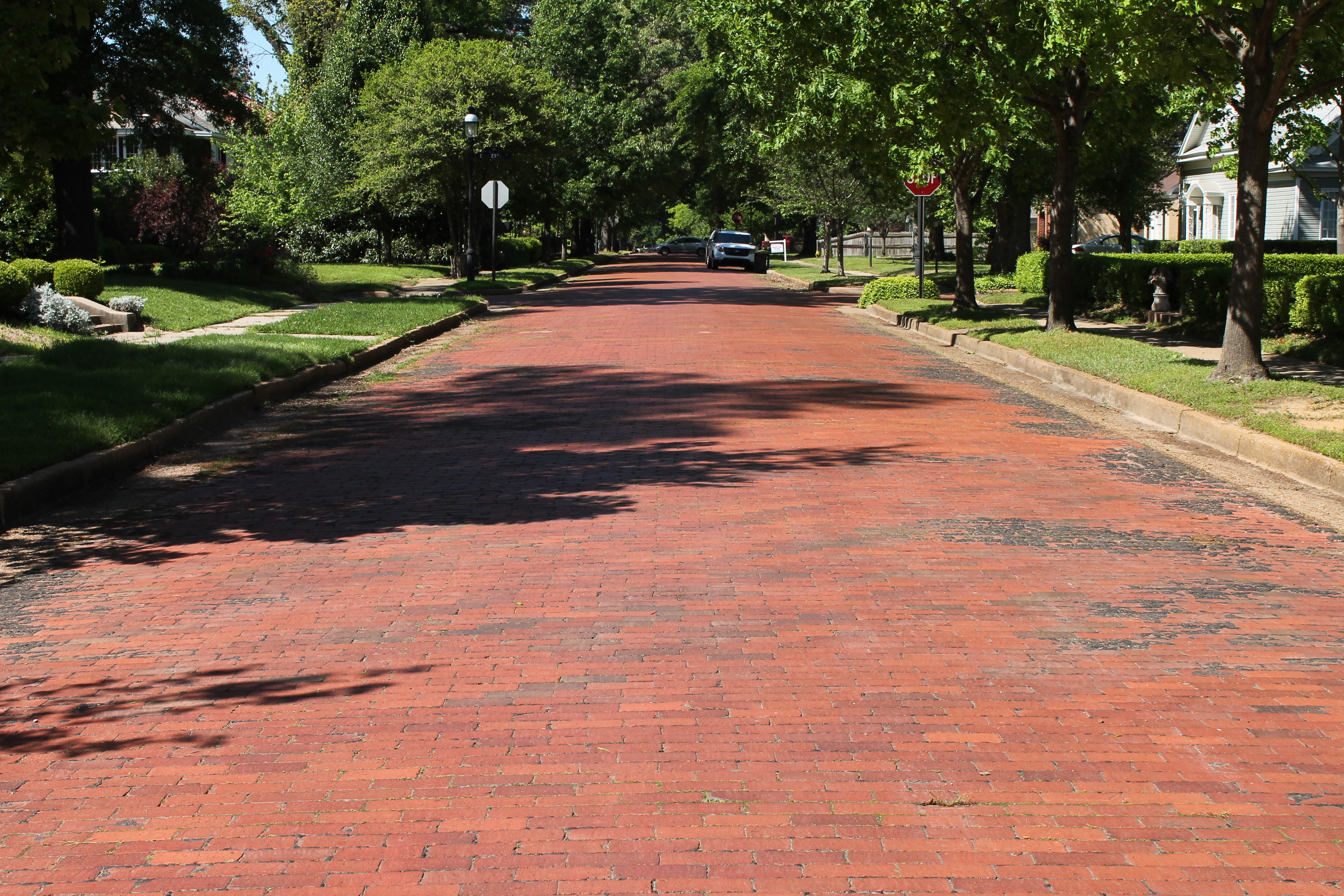

- Location within Arkansas Location within the United States
- Location: Beech Street between 14th and 24th streets., Texarkana, Arkansas
- Coordinates: 33°26′50″N 94°2′21″W
- Area: 2.5 acres (1.0 ha)
- Part of: Beech Street Historic District (ID09001254)
- NRHP reference No.: 07000438

Significant dates
- Added to NRHP: May 22, 2007
- Designated CP: January 21, 2010

The Beech Street Brick Street is an historic section of the Beech Street roadway in Texarkana, Arkansas. It consists of a section of road, between 14th and 24th Streets, which was paved in brick c. 1904. It is a residential road located northeast of Texarkana's downtown, and is about 3,425 feet (1,044 m) long and 23 feet (7.0 m) wide. The bricks, which measure 4 by 8.5 inches (10 by 22 cm), are laid in a running bond pattern. The road section is a rare surviving example of the use of brick as a paving material, as most such roads have since been paved over with asphalt.

The road section was listed on the National Register of Historic Places in 2007. It contributes to the historic significance of the Beech Street Historic District, which includes the residential properties on Beech Street and some adjacent roads.

== See also ==
- National Register of Historic Places listings in Miller County, Arkansas
