= Crenshaw Site =

Archaeological site in Arkansas, United States

- U.S. National Register of Historic Places
- Location within Arkansas Location within the United States
- Nearest city: Hervey, Arkansas
- Coordinates: 33.49707°N 93.74670°W
- Area: 80 acres (32 ha)
- Built: 0700
- NRHP reference No.: 93001521
- Added to NRHP: January 26, 1994

The Crenshaw site (3MI6) is a multiple-mound Caddo ceremonial center located in the Great Bend Region of the Red River in Miller County, Arkansas. It is known for the presence of both "pre-Caddo" or Fourche Maline materials and later Caddo materials. It also has some characteristics that separate it from many other sites including a causeway between two of the mounds, a deposit of deer of over 2,000 deer antlers, and deposits of stacked human skulls and detached mandibles representing over 300 individuals.

The site was listed on the National Register of Historic Places in 1994.

== See also ==
- National Register of Historic Places listings in Miller County, Arkansas
