= Beech Street Historic District (Texarkana, Arkansas) =

Historic district in Arkansas, United States

- U.S. National Register of Historic Places
- U.S. Historic district
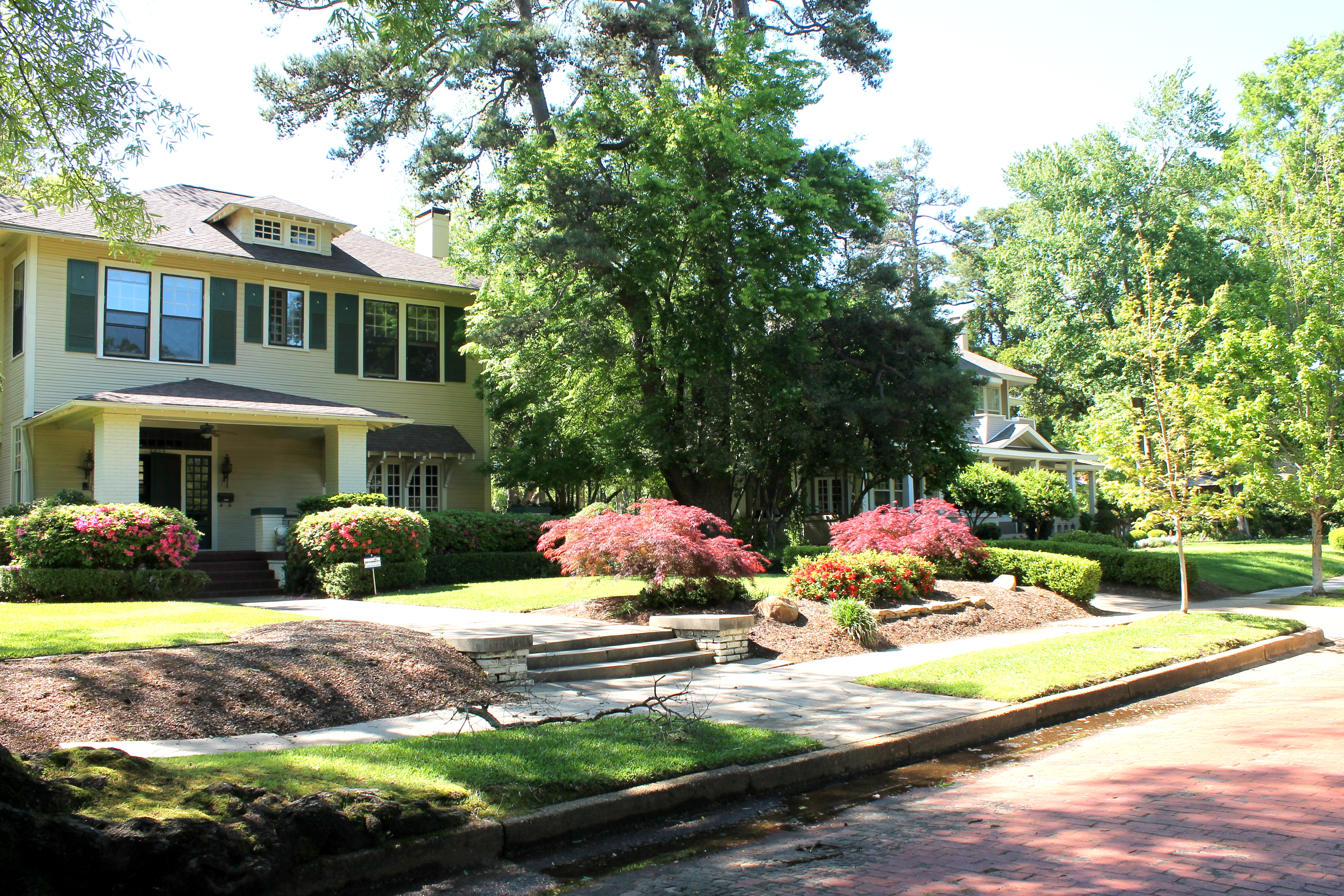

- Location within Arkansas Location within the United States
- Location: Roughly Beech St. between 14th and 23rd Sts., Texarkana, Arkansas
- Area: 31.7 acres (12.8 ha)
- Built: 1904
- Architect: Witt & Seibert; et al.
- Architectural style: Late 19th And 20th Century Revivals, Late 19th And Early 20th Century American Movements
- NRHP reference No.: 09001254
- Added to NRHP: January 20, 2010

The Beech Street Historic District is a residential historic district northeast of the downtown area of Texarkana, Arkansas. It encompasses an area of homes built primarily in the early decades of the 20th century, on Beech Street between 14th and 24th Streets, with a few houses also included on adjacent Ash Street and County Avenue. The roadway is itself notable as a rare surviving early 20th-century section of a brick-paved road. The area represented a new phase in Texarkana's residential growth, which had previously been focused around the railroad, and quickly became a fashionable area to live. The most predominant architectural style is Craftsman, although revival styles popular in the first half of the 20th century are also well represented.

The district was listed on the National Register of Historic Places in 2010. The Dean House, at 1520 Beech Street, was separately listed in 1976.

== See also ==
- National Register of Historic Places listings in Miller County, Arkansas
