= Arkansas Highway 24 =

Highway in Arkansas

Highway 24

Route information
- Maintained by ArDOT

Section 1
- Length: 18.6 mi (29.9 km)
- West end: Panki Bok Road at the Oklahoma state line near Horatio
- East end: US 59 / US 71 / US 371 in Lockesburg

Section 2
- Length: 38.2 mi (61.5 km)
- West end: US 67 / US 371 in Prescott
- East end: US 278 near Camden

Location
- Country: United States
- State: Arkansas
- Counties: Sevier, Nevada, Ouachita

Highway system
- Arkansas Highway System; Interstate; US; State; Business; Spurs; Suffixed; Scenic; Heritage
← AR 23	→ AR 25

Arkansas Highway 24 (AR 24) is a designation for two state highways in Arkansas. One segment of 18.6 miles (29.9 km) runs from the Oklahoma state line east to U.S. Route 71 (US 71) in Lockesburg. A second segment of 38.2 miles (61.5 km) runs from US 371 in Prescott east to US 278 west of Camden. The two sections were formerly connected, but a middle segment of 53 miles (85 km) between Lockesburg and Prescott was redesignated as US 371 in 1994.

== Section 1 ==
Arkansas Highway 24 (AR 24) is a state highway in Sevier County. The route runs 18.6 miles (29.9 km) from the Oklahoma state line east to US 71 in Lockesburg.

=== Route description ===
The route begins at the Oklahoma state line as a continuation of Panki Bok Road and runs east to Horatio. Highway 24 has a short concurrency with Highway 41 in Horatio, but continues east alone. The route is the southern terminus of Highway 329 (a former alignment of US 71) before terminating at US 71 in Lockesburg.

=== Major intersections ===
The entire route is in Sevier County.

Location	mi	km	Destinations	Notes
	0.0	0.0	Panki Bok Road	Continuation into Oklahoma
Horatio	7.4	11.9	AR 41 south – Foreman	Western end of AR 41 concurrency
	9.2	14.8	AR 41 north – De Queen	Eastern end of AR 41 concurrency
	14.7	23.7	AR 329 north to AR 41 south – De Queen	Former US 71
Lockesburg	18.6	29.9	US 59 / US 71 / US 371 – Nashville, De Queen, Texarkana	Eastern terminus
1.000 mi = 1.609 km; 1.000 km = 0.621 mi: Concurrency terminus

== Section 2 ==
Arkansas Highway 24 (AR 24) is a state highway in Nevada and Ouachita Counties. The route runs 38.2 miles (61.5 km) from US 371 in Prescott east to US 278 west of Camden.

=== Route description ===
The route begins at US 371 in Prescott and runs east through the Prairie D'Ane Battlefield. The route intersects a few minor routes near Bluff City and near White Oak Lake State Park before entering Ouachita County. The route also meets Highway 368, which leads to the Poison Springs Wildlife Management Area. Highway 24 meets Highway 57 in Chidester and Highway 76, which runs to Poison Springs Battleground State Park near Bragg Lake. The route continues east past the Richmond-Tufts House and Harvey's Grocery and Texaco Station and terminates at US 278 west of Camden. Highway 24 runs for 20.5 miles (33.0 km) in Nevada County and 17.7 miles (28.5 km) in Ouachita County. The route runs through mostly forested areas.

A two-mile (3.2 km) segment of Highway 24 in Ouachita County was awarded a Perpetual Pavement Award by the Asphalt Pavement Alliance in 2017, awarded on the basis of longevity and structural design. Opened in 1972, the roadway was first resurfaced in 2014.

=== Major intersections ===
County	Location	mi	km	Destinations	Notes
Nevada	Prescott	0.0	0.0	US 67 / US 371 to I-30 – Nashville, Magnolia	Western terminus
Nevada		13.2	21.2	AR 53 north – Gurdon	Southern terminus of AR 53
Nevada		15.1	24.3	AR 368 east	Western terminus of AR 368
Nevada	Bluff City	18.7	30.1	AR 299 south – Morris, Poison Springs State Park, White Oak Lake State Park	Northern terminus of AR 299
Ouachita		23.2	37.3	AR 368 west – Reader	Eastern terminus of AR 368
Ouachita	Chidester	26.0	41.8	AR 57 south	Northern terminus of AR 57
Ouachita		31.8	51.2	AR 76 west to AR 57 – Poison Springs State Park, White Oak Lake State Park	Eastern terminus of AR 76
Ouachita		38.2	61.5	US 278 – Camden, Rosston, Hope	Eastern terminus
1.000 mi = 1.609 km; 1.000 km = 0.621 mi

== See also ==
- List of state highways in Arkansas
