= Arkansas Highway 76 =

Highway in Arkansas

Highway 76

Route information
- Maintained by ArDOT

Section 1
- Length: 7.2 mi (11.6 km)
- West end: US 371 south of Rosston
- East end: US 278 east of Rosston

Section 2
- Length: 6.6 mi (10.6 km)
- West end: AR 57 / AR 387 south of Chidester
- East end: AR 24 near Bragg City

Location
- Country: United States
- State: Arkansas
- Counties: Nevada, Ouachita

Highway system
- Arkansas Highway System; Interstate; US; State; Business; Spurs; Suffixed; Scenic; Heritage
← AR 75	→ AR 77

Arkansas Highway 76 (AR 76, Ark. 76 and Hwy. 76) is the designation for a state Highway in the U.S. state of Arkansas. AR 76 is located in southwest Arkansas, and is split into two sections. The first section begins at U.S. Route 371 (US 371), and ends at US 278. The second section begins at AR 57 and AR 387 south of Chidester, and ends at AR 24 near Bragg City, or about 6.5 miles (10.5 km) northwest of Camden. Both sections are very rural.

== Route description ==
=== Section 1 ===
The western terminus for AR 76 is at US 371 just south of Rosston. From there, the route heads east towards US 278 where its eastern terminus is located. The entire route is about 7.2 miles (11.6 km) long and does not intersect any communities or other highways.

=== Section 2 ===
The western terminus for AR 76 is at AR 57 and AR 387 just south of Chidester, or just west of White Oak Lake State Park. From there, the route heads east towards AR 24, intersecting Poison Springs Battleground State Park along the way. Highway 76's eastern terminus is at AR 24, just southeast of Bragg City or just northwest of Camden. The entire route is about 6.6 miles (10.6 km) long and does not intersect any other communities or highways.

== Major intersections ==
County	Location	mi	km	Destinations	Notes
Nevada		0.0	0.0	US 371 – Rosston, Magnolia, Prescott	Western terminus
Nevada		7.2	11.6	US 278 – Hope, Camden	Eastern terminus
Gap in route
Ouachita	Chidester	0.0	0.0	AR 57 / AR 387 north – Chidester, Bluff City, White Oak Lake State Park	Western terminus; AR 387 southern terminus
Ouachita	Bragg City	6.6	10.6	AR 24 – Camden, Prescott	Eastern terminus
1.000 mi = 1.609 km; 1.000 km = 0.621 mi
