= Arkansas Highway 57 =

State highway in Arkansas, United States

Highway 57

Route information
- Maintained by ArDOT
- Length: 39.38 mi (63.38 km)
- Existed: April 1, 1926–present

Major junctions
- South end: US 82 at Marysville
- US 79 in Stephens
- North end: AR 24 in Chidester

Location
- Country: United States
- State: Arkansas
- Counties: Union, Columbia, Ouachita

Highway system
- Arkansas Highway System; Interstate; US; State; Business; Spurs; Suffixed; Scenic; Heritage
← I-57	→ AR 58

Highway 57 (AR 57, Ark. 57, and Hwy. 57) is a north–south state highway in Southwest Arkansas. The route of 39.38 miles (63.38 km) begins at US Highway 82 (US 82) at Marysville and runs north to Highway 24 in Chidester. The route is maintained by the Arkansas State Highway and Transportation Department (AHTD).

== Route description ==
The route begins at US 82 at Marysville in western Union County near the Columbia County line. A minor route in the rural Arkansas Timberlands, almost all of the route saw an average daily traffic count of under 1000 vehicles per day in 2014.

Highway 57 runs north from US 82 to Highway 160 before turning west and entering Columbia County. The highway runs briefly through the northeast corner of the county, and does not have any state highway junctions in Columbia County. Entering the southwest corner of Ouachita County, Highway 57 enters Stephens, where it intersects US 79. A brief overlap with US 79 begins northward toward Camden, but Highway 57 turns west north of downtown Stephens. Continuing north, Highway 57 has intersections with Highway 332 at Troy, US 278, and Highway 76/Highway 387 near White Oak Lake State Park. The route intersects Highway 24 in Chidester, where it terminates.

== History ==
Highway 57 was created during the 1926 Arkansas state highway numbering as a route between State Road 2 (now US 82) and State Road 3 (now US 79) at Stephens. The route was extended north from Stephens to Highway 4 (now US 278) on July 10, 1957, and north to Chidester on April 24, 1963.

== Major intersections ==
Mile markers reset at concurrencies.

County	Location	mi	km	Destinations	Notes
Union	Marysville	0.00	0.00	US 82 – El Dorado, Magnolia	Southern terminus
Union		5.20	8.37	AR 160 east – Smackover	Western terminus of AR 160
Columbia	No major junctions				
Ouachita	Stephens	16.34– 17.41	26.30– 28.02	US 79 (Main St) – Camden, Magnolia	
Ouachita	Troy	23.97	38.58	AR 332 west	Eastern terminus of AR 332
Ouachita		28.08	45.19	US 278 – Camden, Hope	
Ouachita		35.71	57.47	AR 76 east / AR 387 north – Camden, Bluff City, Poison Springs State Park, White Oak Lake State Park	Western terminus of AR 76, southern terminus of AR 387
Ouachita	Chidester	39.38	63.38	AR 24 – Camden, Bluff City	Northern terminus
1.000 mi = 1.609 km; 1.000 km = 0.621 mi: Concurrency terminus

== See also ==
- Arkansas Highway 57 Bridge, historic pony truss bridge on a former alignment of Highway 57 in Stephens
