= Arkansas Highway 368 =

State highway in Arkansas, United States

Highway 368

Route information
- Maintained by ArDOT
- Length: 6.90 mi (11.10 km)
- Existed: November 23, 1966–present

Major junctions
- South end: AR 24 near Reader
- North end: AR 24 near Reader

Location
- Country: United States
- State: Arkansas
- Counties: Nevada, Ouachita

Highway system
- Arkansas Highway System; Interstate; US; State; Business; Spurs; Suffixed; Scenic; Heritage
| ← AR 367 | → AR 369 |

Highway 368 (AR 368, Ark. 368, and Hwy. 368) is an east–west state highway in South Arkansas. The route of 6.90 miles (11.10 km) runs essentially as a northern loop of Arkansas Highway 24 through Reader while Highway 24 runs more southerly through Bluff City. The route is maintained by the Arkansas State Highway and Transportation Department (AHTD).

== Route description ==
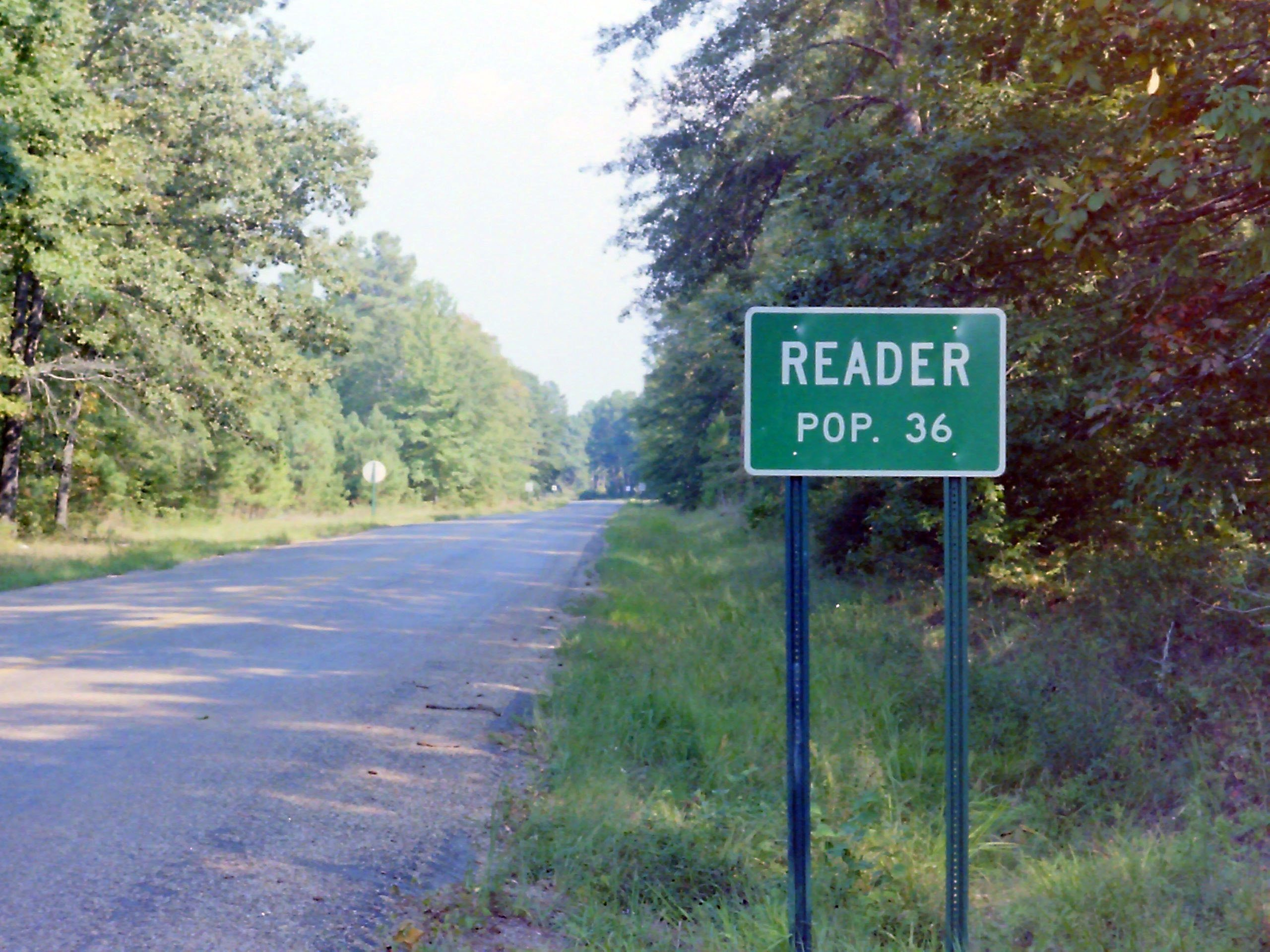
Arkansas Highway 368 enters Reader.

The route connects the community of Reader to the state highway system. Highway 368 begins at Arkansas Highway 24 in Nevada County east of Prescott and runs east to Reader. The route passes the Reader Railroad Depot and Reader Park before it turns south after an intersection with Main Street. It terminates after running through forest land at Highway 24.

== History ==
The route was created by the Arkansas State Highway Commission on November 23, 1966.

== Major intersections ==
| County | Location | mi | km | Destinations | Notes |
|---|---|---|---|---|---|
| Nevada | | 0.00 | 0.00 | AR 24 – Camden | |
| Ouachita | | 6.90 | 11.10 | AR 24 – Camden, Prescott | |
1.000 mi = 1.609 km; 1.000 km = 0.621 mi
