= Arkansas Highway 299 =

State highway in Arkansas, United States

Highway 299

Route information
- Maintained by ArDOT
- Length: 26.40 mi (42.49 km)

Major junctions
- South end: I-30 / AR 174
- US 67, Emmet; AR 53; US 371
- North end: AR 24, White Oak Lake State Park

Location
- Country: United States
- State: Arkansas
- Counties: Hempstead, Nevada

Highway system
- Arkansas Highway System; Interstate; US; State; Business; Spurs; Suffixed; Scenic; Heritage
← AR 298	→ AR 300

Highway 299 (AR 299, Ark. 299, and Hwy. 299) is a north–south state highway in Arkansas. The route of 26.40 miles (42.49 km) runs from Interstate 30 to AR 24 in White Oak Lake State Park. The route is two–lane, undivided.

== Route description ==
Highway 299 begins at Interstate 30 in Hemsptead County. The route runs south to intersect Highway 174 before turning east toward Emmet. In Emmet the route has a 0.1 miles (0.16 km) overlap with US 67 before continuing east into Nevada County. The route has a short concurrency with Highway 53 and then US 371 near Laneburg. East of this overlap the route serves as a terminus for Highway 372 and later Highway 200 before entering White Oak Lake State Park. After an intersection with Highway 387 the route terminates at Highway 24. The route was most recently paved when a segment in Nevada County was resurfaced 1975, with all portions last receiving paving prior to that project.

== History ==
The portions from Emmet-Highway 53 and from Highway 24-White Oak Lake State Park (at the time the Arkansas State Nursery) were added to the state highway system on April 24, 1963. The discontinuous segments were connected on June 23, 1965.

== Major intersections ==
County	Location	mi	km	Destinations	Notes
Hempstead		0.00	0.00	I-30 – Little Rock, Texarkana	Southern terminus
Hempstead		0.50	0.80	AR 174 east	
Nevada	Emmet	3.42	5.50	US 67 south (1st Street) – Perrytown, Hope	
Nevada	Emmet	US 67 concurrency north, 0.1 miles (0.16 km)			
Nevada	Emmet	0.00	0.00	US 67 north (1st Street) – Prescott	
Nevada		6.83	10.99	AR 53 south – Bodcaw	
Nevada	AR 53 concurrency north, 0.3 miles (0.48 km)				
Nevada	US 371 concurrency south, 0.9 miles (1.4 km)				
Nevada		0.00	0.00	US 371 south – Rosston	
Nevada		4.31	6.94	AR 372 west – Serepta Springs	
Nevada		6.73	10.83	AR 200 west – Cale	
Nevada	Bluff City	16.07	25.86	AR 387 south – White Oak Lake State Park, Poison Springs State Park	
Nevada	Bluff City	16.15	25.99	AR 24 – Prescott, Camden	Northern terminus
1.000 mi = 1.609 km; 1.000 km = 0.621 mi: Concurrency terminus

== See also ==
- List of state highways in Arkansas
