= Harvey's Grocery and Texaco Station =

- U.S. National Register of Historic Places
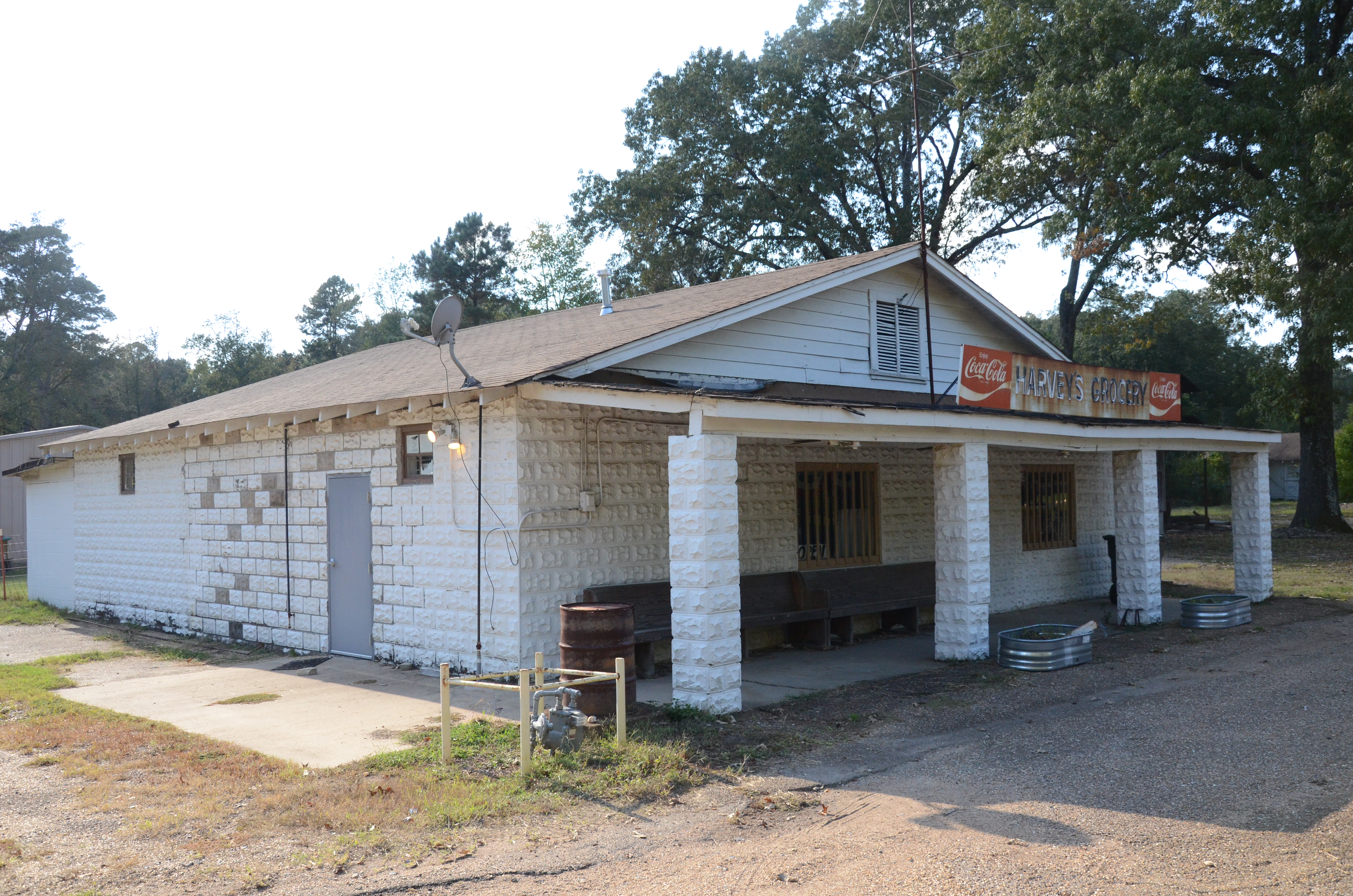

- Location within Arkansas Location within the United States
- Nearest city: Camden, Arkansas
- Coordinates: 33°36′31″N 92°54′43″W
- Area: less than one acre
- Built: 1948
- Built by: Henry Harvey
- MPS: Arkansas Highway History and Architecture MPS
- NRHP reference No.: 01000524
- Added to NRHP: May 25, 2001

Harvey's Grocery and Texaco Station is a historic retail establishment at 3241 Arkansas Highway 24, between Camden and Chidester, Arkansas. The single-story concrete block building was built in 1940 by Henry Harvey, replacing a log structure that had previously housed his retail establishment. The building is one of the best-preserved examples of 1940s vernacular general stores and gas stations in the Camden area. The style of the building is, despite its modern construction materials, reminiscent of 19th century retail buildings, with a small windows placed high on the sides (to provide illumination above the store shelves), and a full-width front porch. The Harveys pumped gas until 1979, after which the tanks were removed. Harvey's was also a locally notable stop for politicians on the stump in Arkansas: those who are known to have stopped here were Bill Clinton, David Pryor, and Jay Dickey.

The property was listed on the National Register of Historic Places in 2001.

== See also ==
- National Register of Historic Places listings in Ouachita County, Arkansas
