= List of lakes of Ouachita County, Arkansas =

There are at least 44 named lakes and reservoirs in Ouachita County, Arkansas.

== Lakes ==
- Bacon Lake, 33°48′01″N 092°52′31″W, el. 112 feet (34 m)
- Ben Davis Lake, 33°23′35″N 092°39′11″W, el. 79 feet (24 m)
- Big Dixon Lake, 33°43′10″N 092°50′50″W, el. 108 feet (33 m)
- Blue Lake, 33°35′28″N 092°46′15″W, el. 89 feet (27 m)
- Burks Pond, 33°39′04″N 092°45′54″W, el. 115 feet (35 m)
- Fishers Lake, 33°37′34″N 092°49′39″W, el. 89 feet (27 m)
- Georgia Lake, 33°46′06″N 092°52′11″W, el. 108 feet (33 m)
- Grayson Pond, 33°39′11″N 093°06′27″W, el. 213 feet (65 m)
- Hook Lake, 33°37′00″N 092°49′04″W, el. 98 feet (30 m)
- Little Dixon Lake, 33°42′46″N 092°50′50″W, el. 108 feet (33 m)
- Little Johnson Lake, 33°35′53″N 092°46′52″W, el. 89 feet (27 m)
- Lower Old Brake, 33°39′55″N 092°52′46″W, el. 112 feet (34 m)
- Lower Old River, 33°38′04″N 092°50′10″W, el. 89 feet (27 m)
- Moon Lake, 33°42′07″N 092°53′07″W, el. 98 feet (30 m)
- Mustin Lake, 33°34′22″N 092°45′17″W, el. 95 feet (29 m)
- Pedron Lake, 33°31′11″N 092°46′24″W, el. 89 feet (27 m)
- Pine Lake, 33°38′50″N 092°50′00″W, el. 95 feet (29 m)
- Round Lake, 33°35′02″N 092°46′28″W, el. 89 feet (27 m)
- Tate Lake, 33°44′24″N 092°53′05″W, el. 105 feet (32 m)
- Toney Old River, 33°41′39″N 092°52′12″W, el. 92 feet (28 m)
- Treadway Slough, 33°35′04″N 092°49′02″W, el. 89 feet (27 m)
- Upper Old Brake, 33°41′14″N 092°53′32″W, el. 105 feet (32 m)
- Utley Lake, 33°45′19″N 092°51′33″W, el. 121 feet (37 m)
- Walker Lake, 33°33′29″N 092°43′35″W, el. 92 feet (28 m)
- Webb Lake, 33°34′43″N 092°45′53″W, el. 95 feet (29 m)
- Woodard Lake, 33°36′29″N 092°46′33″W, el. 92 feet (28 m)

== Reservoirs ==
- Beavers Lake, 33°43′14″N 093°01′29″W, el. 239 feet (73 m)
- Berg Lake, 33°35′00″N 092°52′01″W, el. 161 feet (49 m)
- Bragg Lake, 33°38′52″N 092°58′25″W, el. 144 feet (44 m)
- Brigham Lake, 33°29′28″N 093°05′07″W, el. 256 feet (78 m)
- Davis Lake, 33°24′21″N 093°02′32″W, el. 213 feet (65 m)
- Garner Lake Number One, 33°45′02″N 092°40′18″W, el. 197 feet (60 m)
- Graysons Lake, 33°24′59″N 093°04′06″W, el. 223 feet (68 m)
- Greenings Lake, 33°33′22″N 092°57′45″W, el. 167 feet (51 m)
- Harvey Pond, 33°35′59″N 092°55′04″W, el. 184 feet (56 m)
- Hassics Lake, 33°24′51″N 093°05′11″W, el. 203 feet (62 m)
- Kennedy Pond, 33°36′25″N 092°53′31″W, el. 213 feet (65 m)
- Lake Darby, 33°32′09″N 092°53′54″W, el. 144 feet (44 m)
- Lake Landers, 33°29′15″N 092°58′37″W, el. 246 feet (75 m)
- Lower White Oak Lake, 33°42′06″N 093°05′49″W, el. 190 feet (58 m)
- Pace Lake, 33°32′48″N 093°03′35″W, el. 236 feet (72 m)
- Saxon Lake, 33°40′32″N 092°57′20″W, el. 154 feet (47 m)
- Senrac Lake, 33°31′57″N 092°48′42″W, el. 105 feet (32 m)
- Upper White Oak Lake, 33°39′07″N 093°05′17″W, el. 203 feet (62 m)

== See also ==
- List of lakes in Arkansas
