= 1904 United States presidential election in Arkansas =

- November 8, 1904
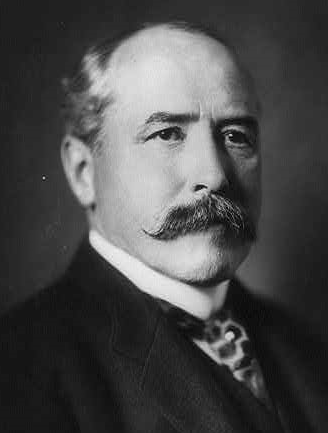

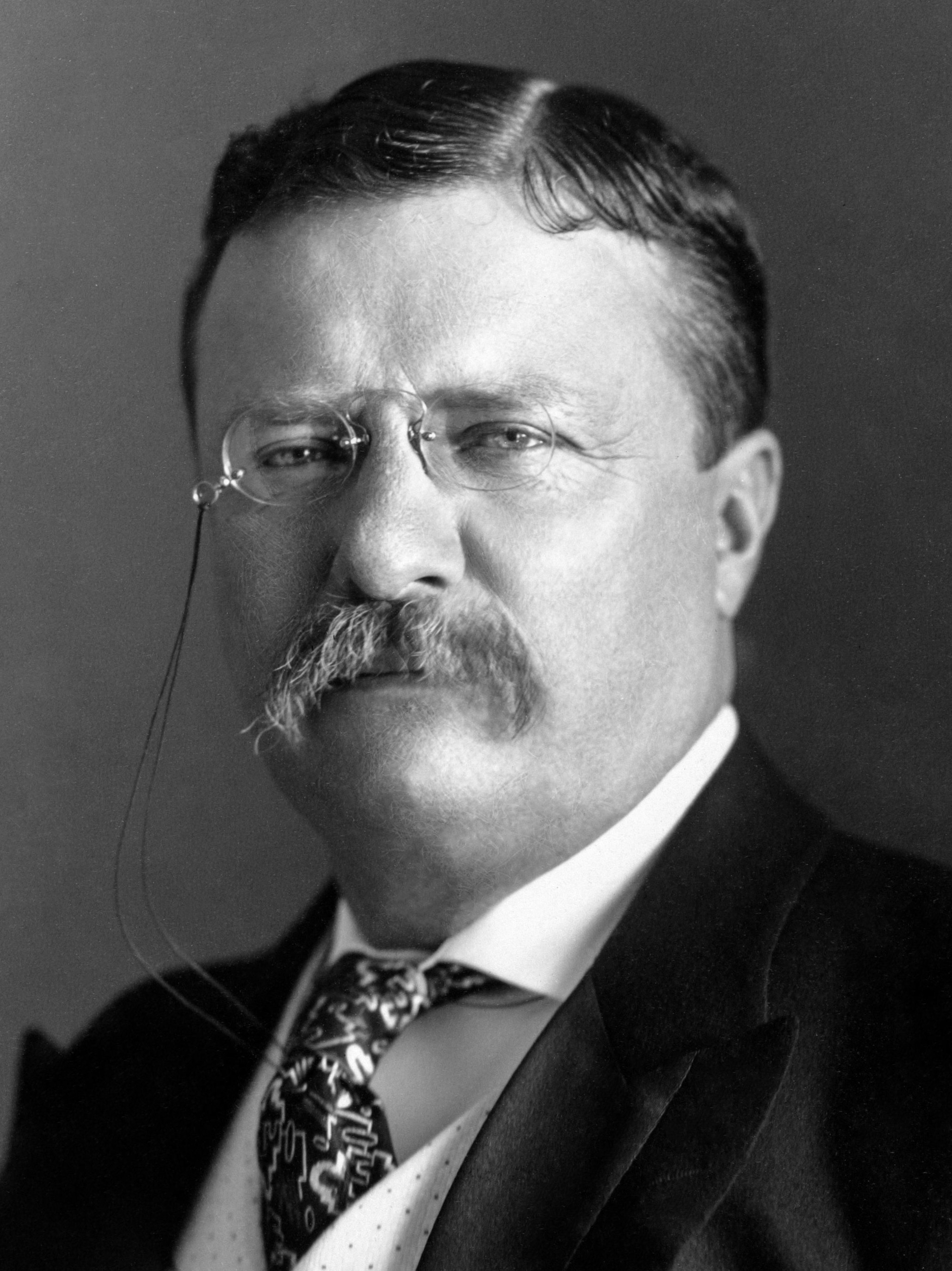
Nominee	Alton B. Parker	Theodore Roosevelt
Party	Democratic	Republican
Home state	New York	New York
Running mate	Henry G. Davis	Charles W. Fairbanks
Electoral vote	9	0
Popular vote	64,434	46,860
Percentage	55.35%	40.25%
County results
Parker
30–40%
40–50%
50–60%
60–70%
70–80%
80–90%
Roosevelt
40–50%
50–60%
60–70%
Tie
45.26% Parker & Roosevelt
President before election
Theodore Roosevelt
Republican
Elected President
Theodore Roosevelt
Republican

The 1904 United States presidential election in Arkansas took place on November 8, 1904. All contemporary 45 states were part of the 1904 United States presidential election. Voters chose nine electors to the Electoral College, which selected the president and vice president.

Arkansas was won by the Democratic nominees, Chief Judge Alton B. Parker of New York and his running mate Henry G. Davis of West Virginia. They defeated the Republican nominee, incumbent President Theodore Roosevelt of New York and his running mate Charles W. Fairbanks of Indiana. Parker won the state by margin of 15.1%.

== Results ==
1904 United States presidential election in Arkansas
Party	Candidate	Votes	Percentage	Electoral votes
Democratic	Alton B. Parker	64,434	55.35%	9
Republican	Theodore Roosevelt (incumbent)	46,860	40.25%	0
Populist	Thomas E. Watson	2,318	1.99%	0
Social Democratic	Eugene V. Debs	1,816	1.56%	0
Prohibition	Silas C. Swallow	993	0.85%	0
Totals		116,421	100.00%	9
Voter turnout				—

=== Results by county ===
1904 United States presidential election in Arkansas by county
County	Alton Brooks Parker Democratic		Theodore Roosevelt Republican		Thomas Edward Watson Populist		Eugene Victor Debs Social Democratic		Silas Comfort Swallow Prohibition		Margin		Total votes cast
County	#	%	#	%	#	%	#	%	#	%	#	%	Total votes cast
Arkansas	753	58.06%	470	36.24%	25	1.93%	32	2.47%	17	1.31%	283	21.82%	1,297
Ashley	804	69.13%	347	29.84%	6	0.52%	1	0.09%	5	0.43%	457	39.29%	1,163
Baxter	426	62.10%	236	34.40%	4	0.58%	17	2.48%	3	0.44%	190	27.70%	686
Benton	1,963	57.30%	1,202	35.08%	75	2.19%	124	3.62%	62	1.81%	761	22.21%	3,426
Boone	910	56.66%	618	38.48%	13	0.81%	48	2.99%	17	1.06%	292	18.18%	1,606
Bradley	569	73.51%	188	24.29%	9	1.16%	5	0.65%	3	0.39%	381	49.22%	774
Calhoun	501	67.43%	235	31.63%	7	0.94%	0	0.00%	0	0.00%	266	35.80%	743
Carroll	925	48.99%	869	46.03%	34	1.80%	42	2.22%	18	0.95%	56	2.97%	1,888
Chicot	549	52.54%	496	47.46%	0	0.00%	0	0.00%	0	0.00%	53	5.07%	1,045
Clark	722	44.13%	732	44.74%	167	10.21%	5	0.31%	10	0.61%	-10	-0.61%	1,636
Clay	968	54.11%	752	42.03%	27	1.51%	28	1.57%	14	0.78%	216	12.07%	1,789
Cleburne	394	57.35%	214	31.15%	55	8.01%	15	2.18%	9	1.31%	180	26.20%	687
Cleveland	704	58.23%	330	27.30%	20	1.65%	81	6.70%	74	6.12%	374	30.93%	1,209
Columbia	1,445	71.18%	554	27.29%	17	0.84%	6	0.30%	8	0.39%	891	43.89%	2,030
Conway	1,572	61.74%	937	36.80%	16	0.63%	10	0.39%	11	0.43%	635	24.94%	2,546
Craighead	1,051	61.07%	559	32.48%	39	2.27%	37	2.15%	35	2.03%	492	28.59%	1,721
Crawford	875	46.47%	941	49.97%	15	0.80%	25	1.33%	27	1.43%	-66	-3.51%	1,883
Crittenden	344	45.20%	412	54.14%	3	0.39%	1	0.13%	1	0.13%	-68	-8.94%	761
Cross	630	64.35%	321	32.79%	1	0.10%	27	2.76%	0	0.00%	309	31.56%	979
Dallas	604	52.43%	496	43.06%	37	3.21%	7	0.61%	8	0.69%	108	9.38%	1,152
Desha	204	71.08%	82	28.57%	0	0.00%	0	0.00%	1	0.35%	122	42.51%	287
Drew	953	60.16%	593	37.44%	17	1.07%	14	0.88%	7	0.44%	360	22.73%	1,584
Faulkner	1,073	56.27%	764	40.06%	28	1.47%	25	1.31%	17	0.89%	309	16.20%	1,907
Franklin	968	57.04%	593	34.94%	66	3.89%	39	2.30%	31	1.83%	375	22.10%	1,697
Fulton	481	53.74%	359	40.11%	18	2.01%	30	3.35%	7	0.78%	122	13.63%	895
Garland	804	47.94%	854	50.92%	5	0.30%	9	0.54%	5	0.30%	-50	-2.98%	1,677
Grant	406	72.50%	151	26.96%	0	0.00%	2	0.36%	1	0.18%	255	45.54%	560
Greene	922	66.38%	409	29.45%	38	2.74%	6	0.43%	14	1.01%	513	36.93%	1,389
Hempstead	1,410	47.17%	1,477	49.41%	61	2.04%	19	0.64%	22	0.74%	-67	-2.24%	2,989
Hot Spring	605	51.49%	537	45.70%	18	1.53%	7	0.60%	8	0.68%	68	5.79%	1,175
Howard	644	50.27%	500	39.03%	122	9.52%	5	0.39%	10	0.78%	144	11.24%	1,281
Independence	1,052	56.96%	736	39.85%	44	2.38%	5	0.27%	10	0.54%	316	17.11%	1,847
Izard	605	63.62%	313	32.91%	21	2.21%	5	0.53%	7	0.74%	292	30.70%	951
Jackson	746	52.09%	677	47.28%	3	0.21%	2	0.14%	4	0.28%	69	4.82%	1,432
Jefferson	1,520	51.65%	1,324	44.99%	14	0.48%	70	2.38%	15	0.51%	196	6.66%	2,943
Johnson	1,047	64.63%	507	31.30%	22	1.36%	27	1.67%	17	1.05%	540	33.33%	1,620
Lafayette	614	50.62%	566	46.66%	24	1.98%	3	0.25%	6	0.49%	48	3.96%	1,213
Lawrence	672	53.38%	534	42.41%	24	1.91%	16	1.27%	13	1.03%	138	10.96%	1,259
Lee	1,682	51.74%	1,569	48.26%	0	0.00%	0	0.00%	0	0.00%	113	3.48%	3,251
Lincoln	544	58.43%	352	37.81%	16	1.72%	12	1.29%	7	0.75%	192	20.62%	931
Little River	557	55.76%	388	38.84%	32	3.20%	10	1.00%	12	1.20%	169	16.92%	999
Logan	1,237	53.95%	1,007	43.92%	40	1.74%	3	0.13%	6	0.26%	230	10.03%	2,293
Lonoke	1,178	59.62%	775	39.22%	17	0.86%	2	0.10%	4	0.20%	403	20.39%	1,976
Madison	1,072	47.08%	1,160	50.94%	4	0.18%	36	1.58%	5	0.22%	-88	-3.86%	2,277
Marion	580	60.92%	356	37.39%	6	0.63%	6	0.63%	4	0.42%	224	23.53%	952
Miller	763	51.69%	666	45.12%	30	2.03%	12	0.81%	5	0.34%	97	6.57%	1,476
Mississippi	689	61.79%	417	37.40%	3	0.27%	3	0.27%	3	0.27%	272	24.39%	1,115
Monroe	757	57.09%	555	41.86%	3	0.23%	7	0.53%	4	0.30%	202	15.23%	1,326
Montgomery	342	39.36%	491	56.50%	31	3.57%	3	0.35%	2	0.23%	-149	-17.15%	869
Nevada	585	38.39%	556	36.48%	329	21.59%	16	1.05%	38	2.49%	29	1.90%	1,524
Newton	280	29.72%	645	68.47%	4	0.42%	9	0.96%	4	0.42%	-365	-38.75%	942
Ouachita	1,083	52.14%	974	46.89%	7	0.34%	6	0.29%	7	0.34%	109	5.25%	2,077
Perry	477	55.47%	356	41.40%	6	0.70%	17	1.98%	4	0.47%	121	14.07%	860
Phillips	1,434	84.75%	251	14.83%	3	0.18%	0	0.00%	4	0.24%	1,183	69.92%	1,692
Pike	432	42.77%	517	51.19%	35	3.47%	13	1.29%	13	1.29%	-85	-8.42%	1,010
Poinsett	599	64.48%	310	33.37%	6	0.65%	12	1.29%	2	0.22%	289	31.11%	929
Polk	528	44.86%	476	40.44%	85	7.22%	53	4.50%	35	2.97%	52	4.42%	1,177
Pope	1,424	61.38%	850	36.64%	31	1.34%	6	0.26%	9	0.39%	574	24.74%	2,320
Prairie	639	48.59%	648	49.28%	15	1.14%	9	0.68%	4	0.30%	-9	-0.68%	1,315
Pulaski	3,099	53.68%	2,450	42.44%	32	0.55%	163	2.82%	29	0.50%	649	11.24%	5,773
Randolph	838	65.06%	409	31.75%	16	1.24%	22	1.71%	3	0.23%	429	33.31%	1,288
St. Francis	737	55.29%	577	43.29%	5	0.38%	11	0.83%	3	0.23%	160	12.00%	1,333
Saline	588	57.20%	391	38.04%	23	2.24%	17	1.65%	9	0.88%	197	19.16%	1,028
Scott	458	45.26%	458	45.26%	36	3.56%	41	4.05%	19	1.88%	0	0.00%	1,012
Searcy	404	35.07%	709	61.55%	9	0.78%	24	2.08%	6	0.52%	-305	-26.48%	1,152
Sebastian	1,645	50.06%	1,254	38.16%	75	2.28%	245	7.46%	67	2.04%	391	11.90%	3,286
Sevier	711	58.33%	412	33.80%	67	5.50%	24	1.97%	5	0.41%	299	24.53%	1,219
Sharp	671	65.91%	288	28.29%	21	2.06%	28	2.75%	10	0.98%	383	37.62%	1,018
Stone	277	51.30%	233	43.15%	11	2.04%	12	2.22%	7	1.30%	44	8.15%	540
Union	955	75.79%	297	23.57%	5	0.40%	2	0.16%	1	0.08%	658	52.22%	1,260
Van Buren	578	49.23%	542	46.17%	34	2.90%	13	1.11%	7	0.60%	36	3.07%	1,174
Washington	1,978	55.94%	1,369	38.72%	55	1.56%	87	2.46%	47	1.33%	609	17.22%	3,536
White	1,238	57.50%	676	31.40%	130	6.04%	47	2.18%	62	2.88%	562	26.10%	2,153
Woodruff	861	57.86%	578	38.84%	2	0.13%	40	2.69%	7	0.47%	283	19.02%	1,488
Yell	1,079	53.15%	913	44.98%	7	0.34%	10	0.49%	21	1.03%	166	8.18%	2,030
Totals	64,434	55.39%	46,760	40.20%	2,326	2.00%	1,816	1.56%	992	0.85%	17,674	15.19%	116,328

== See also ==
- United States presidential elections in Arkansas
