= 1912 United States presidential election in Arkansas =

- November 5, 1912

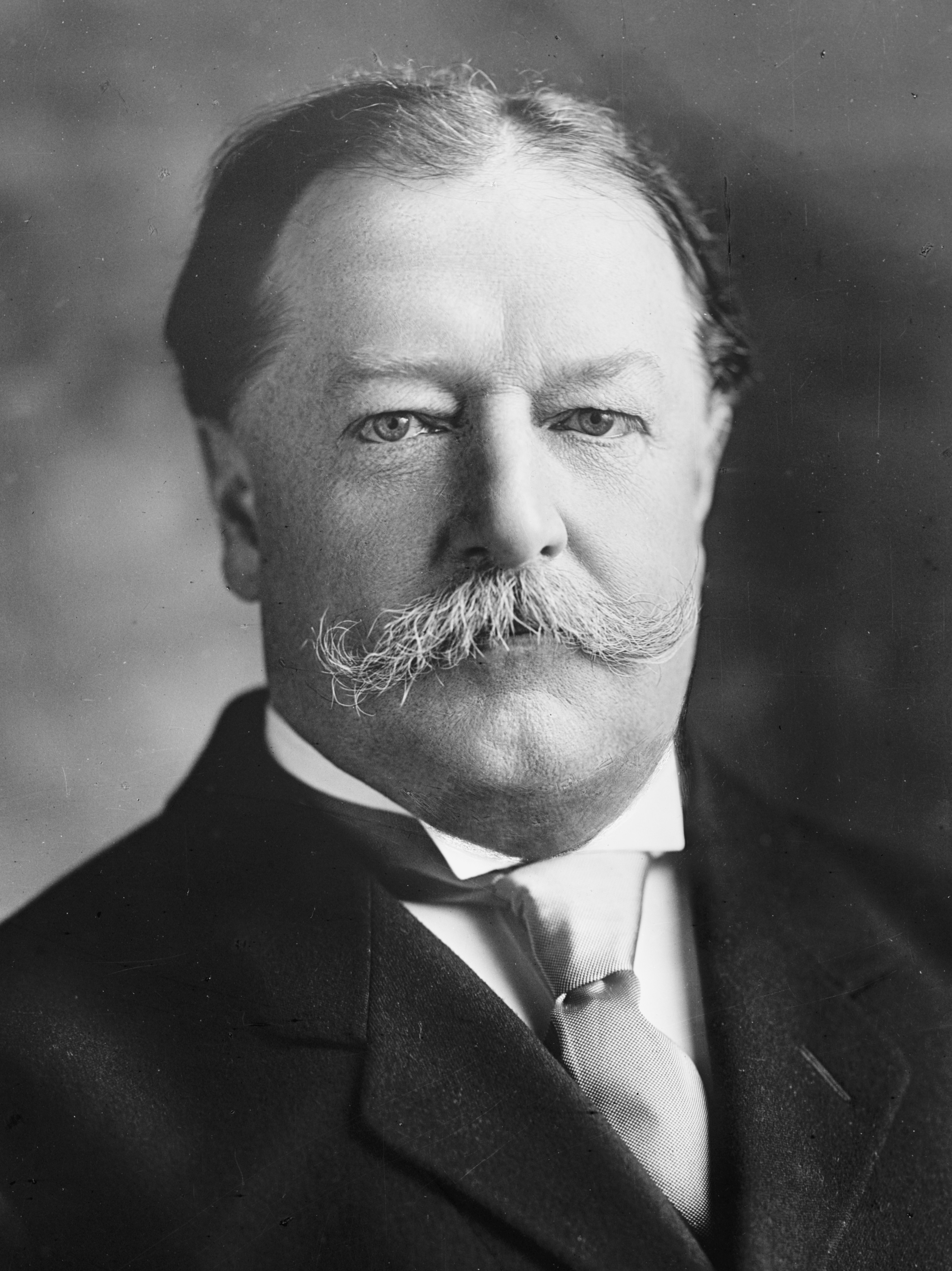

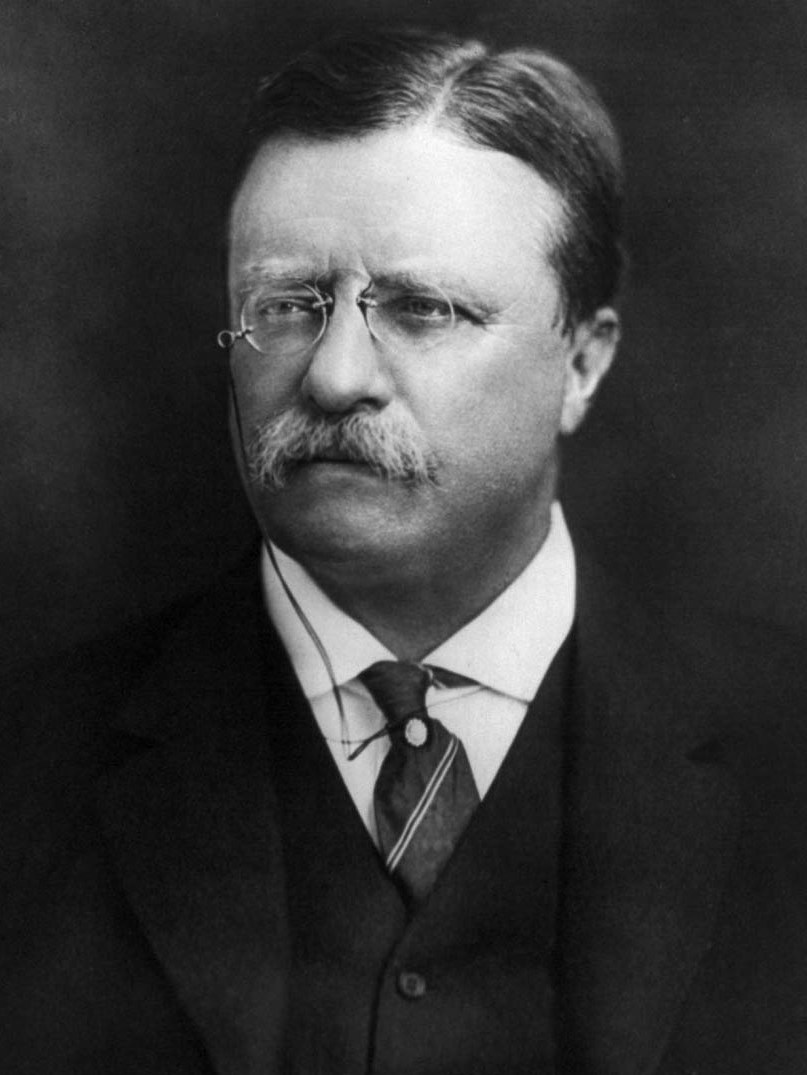

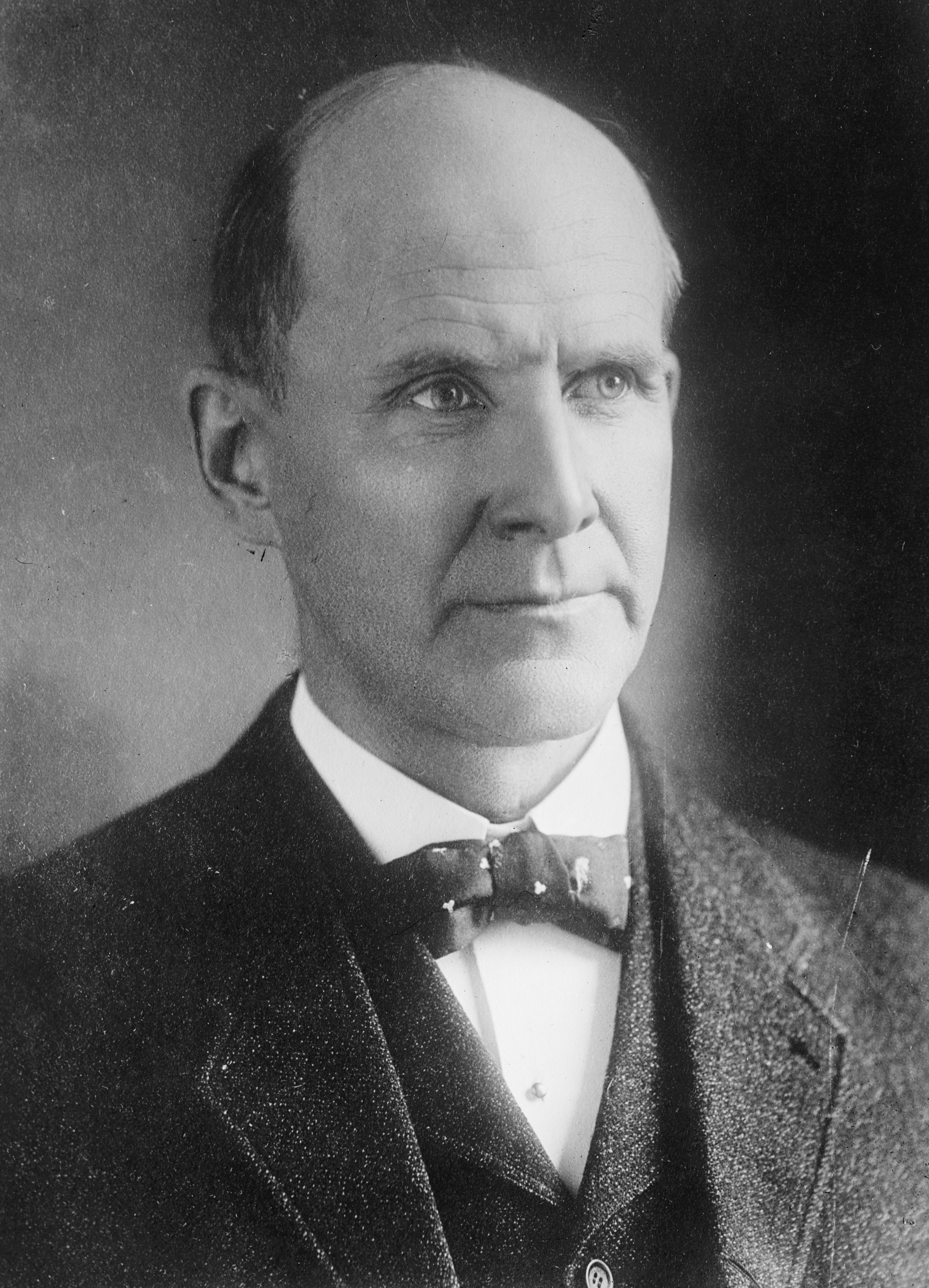
Nominee	Woodrow Wilson	William Howard Taft
Party	Democratic	Republican
Home state	New Jersey	Ohio
Running mate	Thomas R. Marshall	Nicholas M. Butler
Electoral vote	9	0
Popular vote	68,814	25,585
Percentage	55.01%	20.45%
Nominee	Theodore Roosevelt	Eugene V. Debs
Party	Progressive	Socialist
Home state	New York	Indiana
Running mate	Hiram Johnson	Emil Seidel
Electoral vote	0	0
Popular vote	21,644	8,153
Percentage	17.30%	6.52%
County results
Wilson
30–40%
40–50%
50–60%
60–70%
70–80%
Taft
40–50%
President before election
William Howard Taft
Republican
Elected President
Woodrow Wilson
Democratic

The 1912 United States presidential election in Arkansas took place on November 5, 1912, as part of the 1912 United States presidential election. Voters chose nine representatives, or electors, to the Electoral College, who voted for president and vice president.

Arkansas was won by Princeton University President Woodrow Wilson (D–Virginia), running with governor of Indiana Thomas R. Marshall, with 55.01 percent of the popular vote, against the 27th president of the United States William Howard Taft (R–Ohio), running with Columbia University President Nicholas Murray Butler, with 20.45 percent, the 26th president of the United States Theodore Roosevelt (P–New York), running with governor of California Hiram Johnson, with 17.30 percent, and the five-time candidate of the Socialist Party of America for President of the United States Eugene V. Debs (S–Indiana), running with the first Socialist mayor of a major city in the United States Emil Seidel, with 6.52 percent.

== Results ==
1912 United States presidential election in Arkansas
Party	Candidate	Votes	%
Democratic	Woodrow Wilson	68,814	55.01%
Republican	William Howard Taft (incumbent)	25,585	20.45%
Progressive	Theodore Roosevelt	21,644	17.30%
Socialist	Eugene V. Debs	8,153	6.52%
Prohibition	Eugene Chafin	908	0.73%
Total votes		125,104	100%

=== Results by county ===
1912 United States presidential election in Arkansas by county
County	Thomas Woodrow Wilson Democratic		William Howard Taft Republican		Theodore Roosevelt Progressive/"Bull Moose"		Eugene Victor Debs Socialist		Eugene Wilder Chafin Prohibition		Margin		Total votes cast
County	#	%	#	%	#	%	#	%	#	%	#	%	Total votes cast
Arkansas	869	58.48%	249	16.76%	305	20.52%	46	3.10%	17	1.14%	564 (Note: In this county where Roosevelt ran second ahead of Taft, the margins given are those between Wilson and Roosevelt.)	37.95%	1,486
Ashley	1,029	54.21%	439	23.13%	346	18.23%	82	4.32%	2	0.11%	590	31.09%	1,898
Baxter	536	53.55%	142	14.19%	176	17.58%	144	14.39%	3	0.30%	360	35.96%	1,001
Benton	2,353	60.23%	541	13.85%	660	16.89%	296	7.58%	57	1.46%	1,693	43.33%	3,907
Boone	965	59.68%	280	17.32%	279	17.25%	81	5.01%	12	0.74%	685	42.36%	1,617
Bradley	772	66.38%	137	11.78%	147	12.64%	101	8.68%	6	0.52%	625	53.74%	1,163
Calhoun	438	54.01%	72	8.88%	177	21.82%	109	13.44%	15	1.85%	261	32.18%	811
Carroll	919	48.81%	464	24.64%	358	19.01%	122	6.48%	20	1.06%	455	24.16%	1,883
Chicot	419	49.94%	89	10.61%	308	36.71%	22	2.62%	1	0.12%	111	13.23%	839
Clark	1,051	60.58%	376	21.67%	263	15.16%	36	2.07%	9	0.52%	675	38.90%	1,735
Clay	1,299	51.73%	622	24.77%	358	14.26%	218	8.68%	14	0.56%	677	26.96%	2,511
Cleburne	517	56.81%	138	15.16%	118	12.97%	127	13.96%	10	1.10%	379	41.65%	910
Cleveland	685	62.27%	275	25.00%	98	8.91%	33	3.00%	9	0.82%	410	37.27%	1,100
Columbia	1,101	66.61%	340	20.57%	167	10.10%	42	2.54%	3	0.18%	761	46.04%	1,653
Conway	1,435	60.14%	527	22.09%	364	15.26%	53	2.22%	7	0.29%	908	38.06%	2,386
Craighead	1,259	61.12%	269	13.06%	229	11.12%	297	14.42%	6	0.29%	962 (Note: In this county where Debs ran second ahead of Taft and of Roosevelt, the margin given is that between Wilson and Debs.)	46.70%	2,060
Crawford	969	51.24%	407	21.52%	423	22.37%	81	4.28%	11	0.58%	546	28.87%	1,891
Crittenden	423	53.07%	89	11.17%	285	35.76%	0	0.00%	0	0.00%	138	17.31%	797
Cross	491	44.35%	293	26.47%	234	21.14%	79	7.14%	10	0.90%	198	17.89%	1,107
Dallas	654	49.55%	228	17.27%	406	30.76%	28	2.12%	4	0.30%	248	18.79%	1,320
Desha	314	58.15%	52	9.63%	161	29.81%	13	2.41%	0	0.00%	153	28.33%	540
Drew	882	54.82%	424	26.35%	254	15.79%	43	2.67%	6	0.37%	458	28.46%	1,609
Faulkner	1,316	65.47%	402	20.00%	161	8.01%	111	5.52%	20	1.00%	914	45.47%	2,010
Franklin	1,113	63.02%	258	14.61%	194	10.99%	184	10.42%	17	0.96%	855	48.41%	1,766
Fulton	590	44.46%	453	34.14%	235	17.71%	45	3.39%	4	0.30%	137	10.32%	1,327
Garland	1,046	51.22%	300	14.69%	533	26.10%	148	7.25%	15	0.73%	513	25.12%	2,042
Grant	440	70.51%	110	17.63%	47	7.53%	25	4.01%	2	0.32%	330	52.88%	624
Greene	1,251	60.96%	286	13.94%	259	12.62%	239	11.65%	17	0.83%	965	47.03%	2,052
Hempstead	1,247	46.69%	836	31.30%	468	17.52%	92	3.44%	28	1.05%	411	15.39%	2,671
Hot Spring	668	55.12%	248	20.46%	247	20.38%	42	3.47%	7	0.58%	420	34.65%	1,212
Howard	760	56.84%	321	24.01%	187	13.99%	66	4.94%	3	0.22%	439	32.83%	1,337
Independence	1,225	55.11%	412	18.53%	395	17.77%	168	7.56%	23	1.03%	813	36.57%	2,223
Izard	746	64.03%	215	18.45%	137	11.76%	52	4.46%	15	1.29%	531	45.58%	1,165
Jackson	837	48.95%	543	31.75%	159	9.30%	161	9.42%	10	0.58%	294	17.19%	1,710
Jefferson	1,659	52.77%	579	18.42%	753	23.95%	146	4.64%	7	0.22%	906	28.82%	3,144
Johnson	927	60.87%	189	12.41%	237	15.56%	151	9.91%	19	1.25%	690	45.31%	1,523
Lafayette	498	57.04%	208	23.83%	155	17.75%	10	1.15%	2	0.23%	290	33.22%	873
Lawrence	929	63.76%	218	14.96%	167	11.46%	125	8.58%	18	1.24%	711	48.80%	1,457
Lee	968	52.52%	665	36.08%	194	10.53%	15	0.81%	1	0.05%	303	16.44%	1,843
Lincoln	390	42.03%	292	31.47%	152	16.38%	86	9.27%	8	0.86%	98	10.56%	928
Little River	615	59.25%	232	22.35%	87	8.38%	101	9.73%	3	0.29%	383	36.90%	1,038
Logan	1,319	51.14%	333	12.91%	765	29.66%	149	5.78%	13	0.50%	554	21.48%	2,579
Lonoke	1,129	59.55%	254	13.40%	425	22.42%	71	3.74%	17	0.90%	704	37.13%	1,896
Madison	932	61.03%	286	18.73%	231	15.13%	71	4.65%	7	0.46%	646	42.31%	1,527
Marion	537	53.54%	160	15.95%	145	14.46%	157	15.65%	4	0.40%	377	37.59%	1,003
Miller	846	56.63%	331	22.16%	195	13.05%	106	7.10%	16	1.07%	515	34.47%	1,494
Mississippi	767	58.24%	263	19.97%	183	13.90%	87	6.61%	17	1.29%	504	38.27%	1,317
Monroe	537	43.94%	400	32.73%	201	16.45%	76	6.22%	8	0.65%	137	11.21%	1,222
Montgomery	471	45.16%	221	21.19%	202	19.37%	137	13.14%	12	1.15%	250	23.97%	1,043
Nevada	607	46.62%	322	24.73%	268	20.58%	93	7.14%	12	0.92%	285	21.89%	1,302
Newton	290	32.12%	285	31.56%	247	27.35%	74	8.19%	7	0.78%	5	0.55%	903
Ouachita	913	48.44%	793	42.07%	131	6.95%	38	2.02%	10	0.53%	120	6.37%	1,885
Perry	522	53.98%	163	16.86%	216	22.34%	64	6.62%	2	0.21%	306	31.64%	967
Phillips	926	70.31%	198	15.03%	189	14.35%	2	0.15%	2	0.15%	728	55.28%	1,317
Pike	603	53.46%	331	29.34%	158	14.01%	32	2.84%	4	0.35%	272	24.11%	1,128
Poinsett	593	54.40%	205	18.81%	157	14.40%	126	11.56%	9	0.83%	388	35.60%	1,090
Polk	694	45.72%	162	10.67%	409	26.94%	197	12.98%	56	3.69%	285	18.77%	1,518
Pope	1,517	59.33%	334	13.06%	556	21.74%	134	5.24%	16	0.63%	961	37.58%	2,557
Prairie	647	54.10%	376	31.44%	103	8.61%	60	5.02%	10	0.84%	271	22.66%	1,196
Pulaski	3,369	53.80%	1,044	16.67%	1,547	24.70%	268	4.28%	34	0.54%	1,822	29.10%	6,262
Randolph	997	62.47%	264	16.54%	178	11.15%	130	8.15%	27	1.69%	733	45.93%	1,596
St. Francis	563	55.41%	296	29.13%	90	8.86%	65	6.40%	2	0.20%	267	26.28%	1,016
Saline	814	68.52%	164	13.80%	140	11.78%	65	5.47%	5	0.42%	650	54.71%	1,188
Scott	640	50.96%	206	16.40%	225	17.91%	170	13.54%	15	1.19%	415	33.04%	1,256
Searcy	438	34.98%	514 (Note: Different sources reverse the Republican vote totals for Sebastian and Searcy Counties. In contrast to Deve Leip’s Atlas, Géoelections has 389 Taft votes in Searcy County and 514 in Sebastian County, which would have given Searcy County to Wilson and the Democratic Party)	41.05%	180	14.38%	111	8.87%	9	0.72%	-76	-6.07%	1,252
Sebastian	2,396	59.59%	389	9.67%	748	18.60%	445	11.07%	43	1.07%	1,648	40.98%	4,021
Sevier	789	59.55%	174	13.13%	166	12.53%	183	13.81%	13	0.98%	606	45.74%	1,325
Sharp	681	63.82%	114	10.68%	194	18.18%	71	6.65%	7	0.66%	487	45.64%	1,067
Stone	337	55.07%	113	18.46%	92	15.03%	70	11.44%	0	0.00%	224	36.60%	612
Union	1,090	73.20%	152	10.21%	135	9.07%	106	7.12%	6	0.40%	938	63.00%	1,489
Van Buren	674	52.70%	254	19.86%	266	20.80%	80	6.25%	5	0.39%	408	31.90%	1,279
Washington	1,881	59.53%	565	17.88%	532	16.84%	159	5.03%	23	0.73%	1,316	41.65%	3,160
White	1,448	56.74%	380	14.89%	481	18.85%	208	8.15%	35	1.37%	967	37.89%	2,552
Woodruff	903	53.02%	473	27.77%	258	15.15%	65	3.82%	4	0.23%	430	25.25%	1,703
Yell	1,401	54.83%	436	17.06%	438	17.14%	263	10.29%	17	0.67%	963	37.69%	2,555
Totals	68,814	55.01%	25,585	20.45%	21,644	17.30%	8,153	6.52%	908	0.73%	43,229	34.55%	125,104

== See also ==
- United States presidential elections in Arkansas
