= Arkansas Highway 57 Bridge =

- U.S. National Register of Historic Places
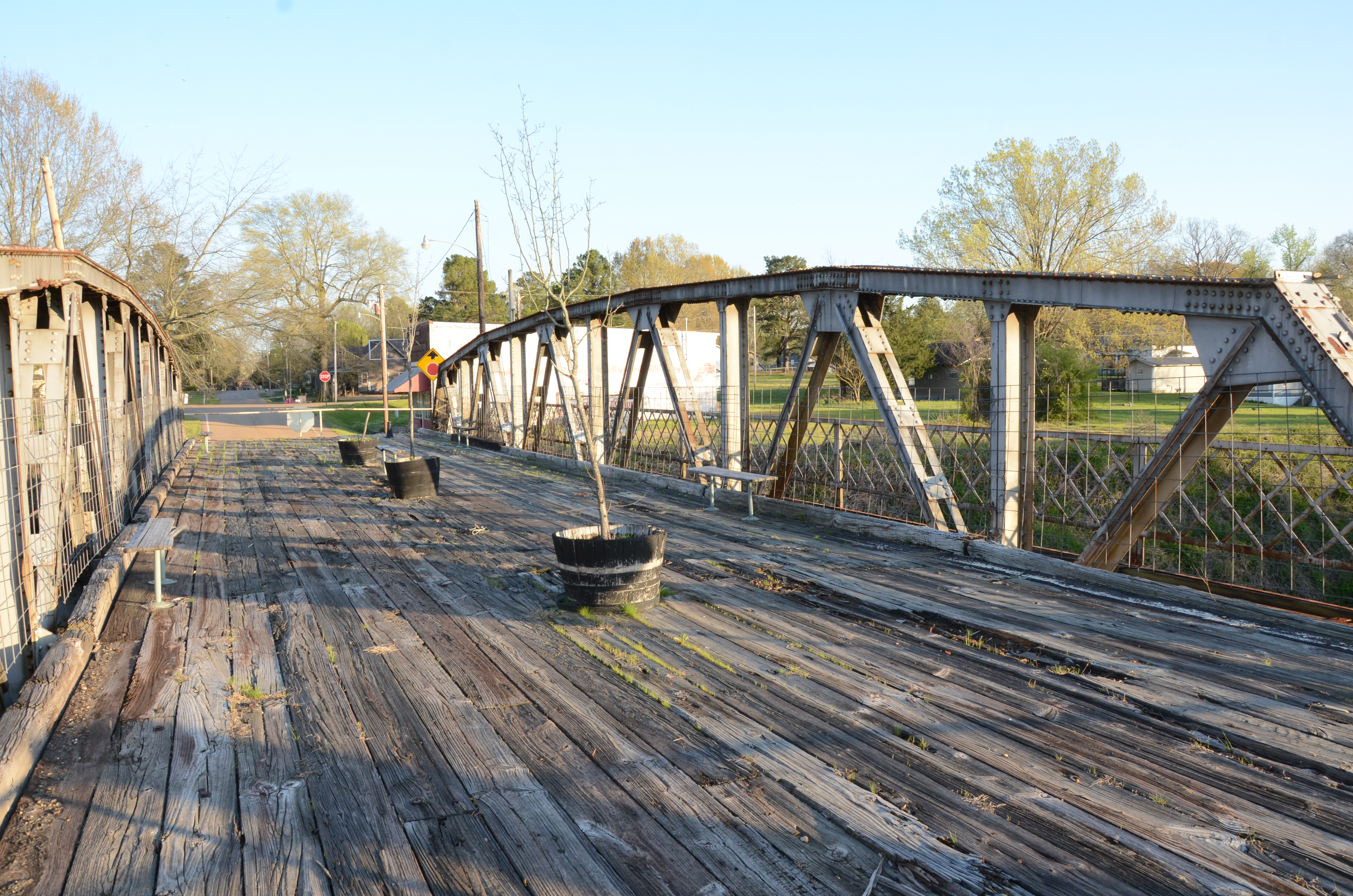

- Location within Arkansas Location within the United States
- Location: Ruby Road (formerly AR 57), now closed, over Union Pacific RR., Stephens, Arkansas
- Coordinates: 33°24′46″N 93°4′10″W
- Area: less than one acre
- Built: 1928
- Architectural style: Warren pony truss
- MPS: Historic Bridges of Arkansas MPS
- NRHP reference No.: 05001078
- Added to NRHP: September 28, 2005

The Arkansas Highway 57 Bridge is a Warren pony truss bridge in Stephens, Arkansas. It carries an old alignment of Arkansas Highway 57 over a branch of the Union Pacific Railroad near the city center. The bridge is now closed to traffic; the road on which it is located is now called Ruby Street. The bridge is distinctive in Arkansas for two reasons: first, it was the last bridge of its type on a state highway, and it has a pedestrian sidewalk on the outside of the trusses. It is unknown who built the trusses; the bridge was built in 1928.

The bridge was listed on the National Register of Historic Places in 2005.

== See also ==
- List of bridges on the National Register of Historic Places in Arkansas
- National Register of Historic Places listings in Ouachita County, Arkansas
