= USS Ouachita County =

1945 LST-542-class tank landing ship

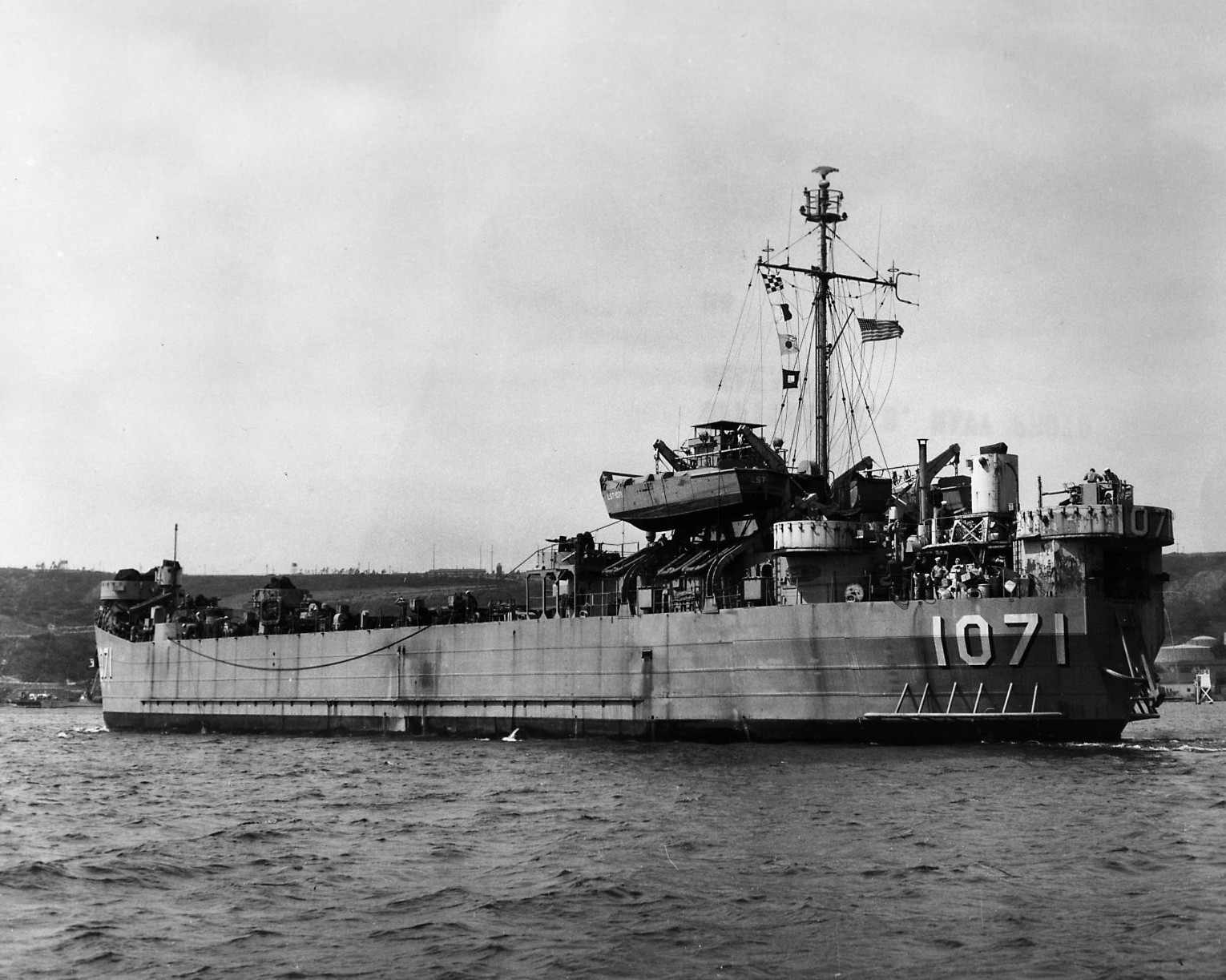

History

United States
- Name: USS LST-1071
- Builder: Bethlehem Hingham Shipyard, Hingham, Massachusetts
- Laid down: 13 February 1945
- Launched: 14 March 1945
- Commissioned: 9 April 1945
- Decommissioned: 10 June 1946
- Recommissioned: 3 January 1951
- Decommissioned: 15 February 1956
- Renamed: USS Ouachita County (LST-1071), 1 July 1955
- Stricken: 1 November 1959
- Fate: Unknown

General characteristics
- Class & type: LST-542-class tank landing ship
- Displacement: 1,625 long tons (1,651 t) light; 3,640 long tons (3,698 t) full
- Length: 328 ft (100 m)
- Beam: 50 ft (15 m)
- Draft: Unloaded : 2 ft 4 in (0.71 m) forward; 7 ft 6 in (2.29 m) aft; Loaded : 8 ft 2 in (2.49 m) forward; 14 ft 1 in (4.29 m) aft
- Propulsion: 2 × General Motors 12-567 diesel engines, two shafts, twin rudders
- Speed: 12 knots (22 km/h; 14 mph)
- Boats & landing craft carried: 2 or 6 × LCVPs
- Troops: Approximately 130 officers and enlisted men
- Complement: 8–10 officers, 89–100 enlisted men
- Armament: 8 × 40 mm guns; 12 × 20 mm guns

USS Ouachita County (LST-1071) was an LST-542-class tank landing ship built for the United States Navy during World War II. Named for Ouachita County, Arkansas, she was the only U.S. Naval vessel to bear the name.

Originally laid down as LST-1071 on 13 February 1945 by the Bethlehem Hingham Shipyard, Inc. of Hingham, Massachusetts; launched on 14 March 1945; and commissioned on 9 April 1945.

== Service history ==
=== World War II, 1945 ===
Following shakedown in Chesapeake Bay, LST–1071 steamed north to New York where she took on pontoon gear, LCT sections and LCT personnel. On 27 May 1945 she departed the East Coast for the Panama Canal and Pearl Harbor where she exchanged her LCT cargo and passengers for one complete LCT and Army troops bound for Guam. There, at that Marianas island when World War II ended, she took on 139th Construction Battalion personnel and sailed for Saipan and Okinawa.

=== Post-war activities, 1945–1946 ===
On 14 September she steamed into Tokyo Bay, from the Ryūkyūs, with Fifth Air Force units en route to occupation duty on Honshū. She completed another Okinawa/Japan run for the Air Force, then steamed to Leyte, whence she carried IX Corps units to Aomori, Japan. Army cargo shuttles in Japanese waters were followed in December by orders to Saipan. From there, on the 27th, she headed back to the United States.

LST–1071 arrived at San Diego on 5 February 1946. On the 10th she moved north to San Francisco, and on the 25th to Portland, Oregon for inactivation. There the LST decommissioned on 10 June 1946 and joined the Pacific Reserve Fleet.

=== Atlantic Fleet, 1951–1955 ===
LST–1071 recommissioned on 3 January 1951. Following shakedown and cargo runs along the California coast, she sailed for the East Coast, arriving at Norfolk, Virginia on 15 June. The LST then commenced operations out of Little Creek, Virginia as a unit of LST Flotilla 2, Atlantic Fleet. For the next four years, she conducted amphibious exercises along the mid-Atlantic coast and at Puerto Rico, and carried Army personnel and supplies to Labrador and Newfoundland. Named USS Ouachita County (LST-1071) on 1 July 1955, she returned from her last voyage in Canadian waters in September and, in November, steamed to Brooklyn for inactivation overhaul.

=== Damage Sustained ===
In early August 1952, LST-1071 sustained ice-related damage while navigating waters off the Northern coast of Labrador. The Officer of the Deck, who was disdained by the crew, did not correct his "wrong" order to turn to Port, rather than Starboard. As a result, the ship went directly into the iceberg. Two other LSTs on the mission pulled the 1071 off the ice. This account was made by a crew member (Richard G. Niehoff) who was on the Counting Tower at the time this event. The ship sailed to the Boston Navy Yard where she was placed in drydock for repairs. The ship was successfully repaired and on 22 September, she resumed her training and supply route that continued to take her around the North American continent.

=== Decommissioning ===
With the new year, 1956, she steamed south to Green Cove Springs, Florida, arriving on 31 January and decommissioning on 15 February. She remained there, berthed as a unit of the Atlantic Reserve Fleet until struck from the Naval Vessel Register on 1 November 1959. Her final fate is unknown. One observer believes he went aboard her while she was tied up at Tacoma, Washington, (late fall, 1961) where within the following several years she was either scrapped or converted into a barge by Foss Tug & Barge.

== See also ==
- List of United States Navy LSTs
