= Arkansas Highway 174 =

State highway in Arkansas, United States

Highway 174

Route information
- Maintained by ArDOT

Section 1
- Length: 6.1 mi (9.8 km)
- West end: US 67 in Hope
- East end: AR 355 in Spring Hill

Section 2
- Length: 4.0 mi (6.4 km)
- West end: I-30 / AR 299 near Emmett
- East end: US 67 in Perrytown

Location
- Country: United States
- State: Arkansas
- Counties: Hempstead

Highway system
- Arkansas Highway System; Interstate; US; State; Business; Spurs; Suffixed; Scenic; Heritage
← AR 173	→ AR 175

Arkansas Highway 174 (AR 174, Ark. 174, and Hwy. 174) is a designation for a state highway in Southwest Arkansas. The route is split into two sections. The first section begins at AR 355 in Spring Hill and ends at US Route 67 (US 67) in Hope. The second section begins at US 67 in Perrytown and ends at AR 299 just south of Interstate 30 (I-30).

== Route description ==
=== Southern segment ===
AR 174 begins at AR 355 in Spring Hill. The route heads north for about six miles (9.7 km) before intersecting US 67 in Hope. The route does not intersect any other highways.

=== Northern segment ===
AR 174 begins at US 67 in Perrytown. The route heads north, intersecting the University of Arkansas Southwest Research and Extension Center (unsigned AR 813) along the way, before eventually ending at AR 299 just south of I-30. The route is about four miles (6.4 km) long.

== Major intersections ==
The entire route is in Hempstead County.

Location	mi	km	Destinations	Notes
Spring Hill	0.0	0.0	AR 355 – Bois d'Arc	Eastern terminus
Hope	6.1	9.8	US 67 – Hope, Texarkana	Western terminus
Gap in route
Perrytown	0.0	0.0	US 67 – Hope, Prescott	Eastern terminus
	4.0	6.4	I-30 / AR 299 north	Western terminus; I-30 exit 36
1.000 mi = 1.609 km; 1.000 km = 0.621 mi
