= Ouachita County, Arkansas =

County in Arkansas, United States

- County
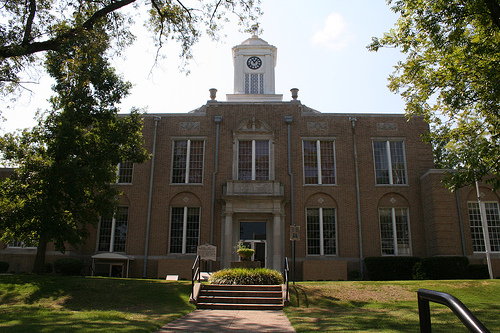
- Ouachita County Courthouse in Camden

- Location within the U.S. state of Arkansas
- Coordinates: 33°36′00″N 92°55′00″W
- Country: United States
- State: Arkansas
- Founded: November 29, 1842
- Named for: Ouachita River
- Seat: Camden
- Largest city: Camden

Area
  - Total: 740 sq mi (1,900 km^{2})
  - Land: 733 sq mi (1,900 km^{2})
  - Water: 7.0 sq mi (18 km^{2}) 0.9%

Population (2020)
  - Total: 22,650
  - Estimate (2025): 21,731 ▼
  - Density: 30.9/sq mi (11.9/km^{2})
- Time zone: UTC−6 (Central)
  - Summer (DST): UTC−5 (CDT)
- Congressional district: 4th

Ouachita County (/ˈwɑːʃɪtɑː/ WAH-shih-tah) is a county located in the south central part of the U.S. state of Arkansas. As of the 2020 census, the population was 22,650.

The county seat is Camden. Ouachita County is part of the Camden, AR Micropolitan Statistical Area. Formed on November 29, 1842, the county is named for the Ouachita River.

== History ==
Until the late 20th century, the county was a Democratic Party stronghold, aided by the state's having disenfranchised most African Americans at the turn of the century. As in much of the rest of the South, conservative whites, who constitute the majority of the population in the county, have shifted into the Republican Party. In 1972, U.S. President Richard M. Nixon became the first Republican presidential nominee in the 20th century to win a majority in Ouachita County. Much later, in the 2008 presidential election, U.S. Senator John McCain won the county by nearly ten percentage votes over Senator Barack Obama, following President George W. Bush's victory over Senator John F. Kerry in 2004.

The politically influential Pryor family is based here; they include two U.S. senators, David Pryor (serving 1978–1997) and his son Mark Pryor (elected 2002). The elder Pryor also served as a former governor of Arkansas and US Congressman. The county is served by a daily newspaper, The Camden News.

== Geography ==
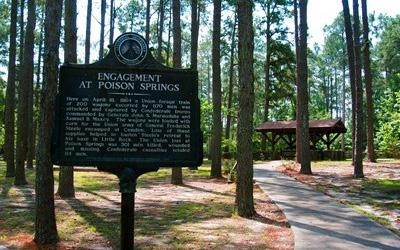
Entrance to the Poison Springs Battleground State Park, a U.S. National Historic Landmark

According to the U.S. Census Bureau, the county has a total area of 740 square miles (1,900 km^{2}), of which 733 square miles (1,900 km^{2}) is land and 7.0 square miles (18 km^{2}) (0.9%) is water.

=== Major highways ===
- Future Interstate 69
- U.S. Highway 79
- U.S. Highway 278
- Highway 4
- Highway 7
- Highway 9
- Highway 24
- Highway 57
- Highway 76
- Highway 203
- Highway 274
- Highway 332
- Highway 368
- Highway 387

=== Adjacent counties ===
- Dallas County (north)
- Calhoun County (east)
- Union County (south)
- Columbia County (southwest)
- Nevada County (west)
- Clark County (northwest)

== Demographics ==
The county had its peak of population in 1950.

Historical population
Census	Pop.	Note	%±
1850	9,591		—
1860	12,936		34.9%
1870	12,975		0.3%
1880	11,758		−9.4%
1890	17,033		44.9%
1900	20,892		22.7%
1910	21,774		4.2%
1920	20,636		−5.2%
1930	29,890		44.8%
1940	31,151		4.2%
1950	33,051		6.1%
1960	31,641		−4.3%
1970	30,896		−2.4%
1980	30,541		−1.1%
1990	30,574		0.1%
2000	28,790		−5.8%
2010	26,120		−9.3%
2020	22,650		−13.3%
2025 (est.)	21,731	▼	−4.1%
U.S. Decennial Census; 1790–1960 1900–1990; 1990–2000 2010

=== 2020 census ===
As of the 2020 census, the county had a population of 22,650. The median age was 44.5 years. 21.6% of residents were under the age of 18 and 21.3% of residents were 65 years of age or older. For every 100 females there were 91.8 males, and for every 100 females age 18 and over there were 88.9 males age 18 and over.

The racial makeup of the county was 53.8% White, 39.3% Black or African American, 0.3% American Indian and Alaska Native, 0.6% Asian, <0.1% Native Hawaiian and Pacific Islander, 1.0% from some other race, and 5.0% from two or more races. Hispanic or Latino residents of any race comprised 2.3% of the population.

43.6% of residents lived in urban areas, while 56.4% lived in rural areas.

There were 9,944 households in the county, of which 26.5% had children under the age of 18 living in them. Of all households, 39.4% were married-couple households, 21.0% were households with a male householder and no spouse or partner present, and 34.5% were households with a female householder and no spouse or partner present. About 34.4% of all households were made up of individuals and 15.0% had someone living alone who was 65 years of age or older.

There were 11,837 housing units, of which 16.0% were vacant. Among occupied housing units, 67.1% were owner-occupied and 32.9% were renter-occupied. The homeowner vacancy rate was 2.0% and the rental vacancy rate was 11.8%.

=== 2010 census ===
As of the 2010 census, there were 26,120 people living in the county. The racial makeup of the county was 56.3% White, 39.9% Black, 0.3% Native American, 0.4% Asian, <0.1% Pacific Islander, 0.1% from some other race and 1.4% from two or more races. 1.6% were Hispanic or Latino of any race.

=== 2000 census ===
As of the 2000 census, there were 28,790 people, 11,613 households, and 8,071 families living in the county. The population density was 39 inhabitants per square mile (15/km^{2}). There were 13,450 housing units at an average density of 18 per square mile (6.9/km^{2}). The racial makeup of the county was 59.74% White, 38.64% Black or African American, 0.25% Native American, 0.24% Asian, 0.03% Pacific Islander, 0.26% from other races, and 0.83% from two or more races. 0.73% of the population were Hispanic or Latino of any race.

There were 11,613 households, out of which 30.80% had children under the age of 18 living with them, 50.00% were married couples living together, 15.60% had a female householder with no husband present, and 30.50% were non-families. 28.00% of all households were made up of individuals, and 13.50% had someone living alone who was 65 years of age or older. The average household size was 2.45 and the average family size was 2.99.

In the county, the population was spread out, with 25.90% under the age of 18, 8.00% from 18 to 24, 25.60% from 25 to 44, 23.60% from 45 to 64, and 16.90% who were 65 years of age or older. The median age was 39 years. For every 100 females, there were 89.80 males. For every 100 females age 18 and over, there were 85.00 males.

The median income for a household in the county was $29,341, and the median income for a family was $35,736. Males had a median income of $30,976 versus $18,800 for females. The per capita income for the county was $15,118. About 16.10% of families and 19.50% of the population were below the poverty line, including 26.20% of those under age 18 and 18.60% of those age 65 or over.

== Government ==
=== Government ===
The county government is a constitutional body granted specific powers by the Constitution of Arkansas and the Arkansas Code. The quorum court is the legislative branch of the county government and controls all spending and revenue collection. Representatives are called justices of the peace and are elected from county districts every even-numbered year. The number of districts in a county vary from nine to fifteen, and district boundaries are drawn by the county election commission. The Ouachita County Quorum Court has eleven members. Presiding over quorum court meetings is the county judge, who serves as the chief operating officer of the county. The county judge is elected at-large and does not vote in quorum court business, although capable of vetoing quorum court decisions.

Ouachita County, Arkansas Elected countywide officials
Position	Officeholder	Party
County Judge	Robbie McAdoo	Democratic
County Clerk	Sherri Hunter	Independent
Circuit Clerk	Gladys Nettles	Democratic
Sheriff/Collector	David Norwood	Democratic
Treasurer	Melinda Chambers	Republican
Assessor	Tonya McKenzie	Democratic
Coroner	Todd McAteer	Republican

The composition of the Quorum Court following the 2024 elections is 8 Republicans, 2 Democrats, and 1 Independent. Justices of the Peace (members) of the Quorum Court following the elections are:

- District 1: Ware Russell (R)
- District 2: Dale Vaughan (R)
- District 3: Eddie Pickett (R)
- District 4: Jonathan Wolfe (R)
- District 5: Shannon Milam (R)
- District 6: Addie Moore-Edwards (R)
- District 7: Wayland Chambers (R)
- District 8: Willie R. Hardy (D)
- District 9: Fred Lilly Sr. (D)
- District 10: Helen Aregood (R)
- District 11: Jerry West (I)

=== Politics ===
Over the past few election cycles Ouachita County has trended towards the GOP. The last Democrat (as of 2024) to carry this county was Al Gore in 2000.

In 2020, the county saw an increase in third party votes compared to 2016, whereas the national trend was a significant drop of third party support.

United States presidential election results for Ouachita County, Arkansas
Year	Republican		Democratic		Third party(ies)	
Year	No.	%	No.	%	No.	%
1896	1,029	42.77%	1,366	56.77%	11	0.46%
1900	1,143	50.18%	1,120	49.17%	15	0.66%
1904	974	46.89%	1,083	52.14%	20	0.96%
1908	1,505	55.76%	1,166	43.20%	28	1.04%
1912	793	42.29%	913	48.69%	169	9.01%
1916	970	40.84%	1,405	59.16%	0	0.00%
1920	1,141	46.12%	1,307	52.83%	26	1.05%
1924	952	41.18%	1,318	57.01%	42	1.82%
1928	1,051	39.92%	1,582	60.08%	0	0.00%
1932	432	12.15%	3,118	87.66%	7	0.20%
1936	262	8.53%	2,808	91.47%	0	0.00%
1940	284	8.77%	2,951	91.08%	5	0.15%
1944	473	13.04%	3,154	86.93%	1	0.03%
1948	476	9.88%	3,315	68.80%	1,027	21.32%
1952	2,171	26.68%	5,936	72.96%	29	0.36%
1956	2,819	34.68%	5,188	63.82%	122	1.50%
1960	2,439	29.77%	5,169	63.10%	584	7.13%
1964	3,572	33.39%	7,056	65.96%	70	0.65%
1968	2,209	18.65%	4,603	38.87%	5,031	42.48%
1972	6,620	62.68%	3,931	37.22%	11	0.10%
1976	2,753	23.53%	8,946	76.47%	0	0.00%
1980	4,329	35.46%	7,152	58.58%	727	5.96%
1984	6,700	51.19%	5,858	44.76%	531	4.06%
1988	6,297	52.29%	5,229	43.42%	517	4.29%
1992	3,711	29.89%	7,411	59.69%	1,293	10.41%
1996	3,136	29.56%	6,635	62.54%	838	7.90%
2000	4,739	45.59%	5,464	52.56%	192	1.85%
2004	5,345	50.19%	5,188	48.71%	117	1.10%
2008	5,427	54.49%	4,346	43.63%	187	1.88%
2012	5,521	53.52%	4,633	44.92%	161	1.56%
2016	5,351	53.86%	4,321	43.49%	263	2.65%
2020	5,294	54.98%	3,995	41.49%	340	3.53%
2024	5,056	58.61%	3,412	39.55%	158	1.83%

== Communities ==
=== Cities ===
- Bearden
- Camden (county seat)
- Chidester
- East Camden
- Stephens

=== Town ===
- Louann

=== Census designated place ===
- Reader

=== Unincorporated community ===
- Cullendale

=== Townships ===
Townships in Arkansas are the divisions of a county. Each township includes unincorporated areas; some may have incorporated cities or towns within part of their boundaries. Arkansas townships have limited purposes in modern times. However, the United States census does list Arkansas population based on townships (sometimes referred to as "county subdivisions" or "minor civil divisions"). Townships are also of value for historical purposes in terms of genealogical research. Each town or city is within one or more townships in an Arkansas county based on census maps and publications. The townships of Ouachita County are listed below; listed in parentheses are the cities, towns, and/or census-designated places that are fully or partially inside the township.

- Behestian
- Bradley (East Camden)
- Bragg
- Bridge Creek (Elliott)
- Carroll
- Cleveland
- Ecore Fabre (most of Camden)
- Freeo
- Jefferson
- Lafayette (small part of Camden)
- Liberty
- Marion (Buena Vista)
- Red Hill (Chidester, most of CDP Reader)
- River
- Smackover (Stephens)
- Union (Bearden)
- Valley
- Washington (Louann)

== Monuments and memorials ==
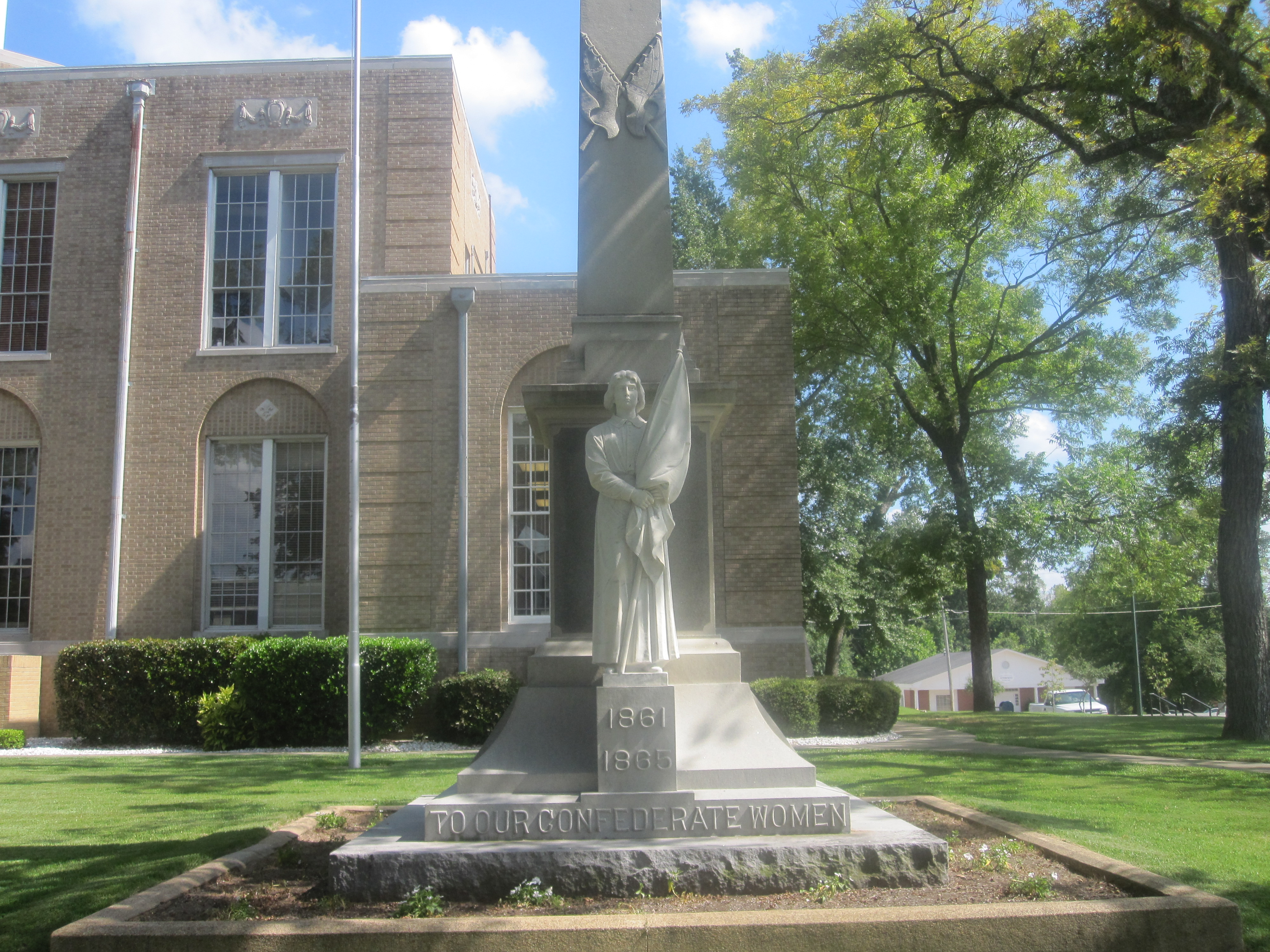
Confederate Women's Monument

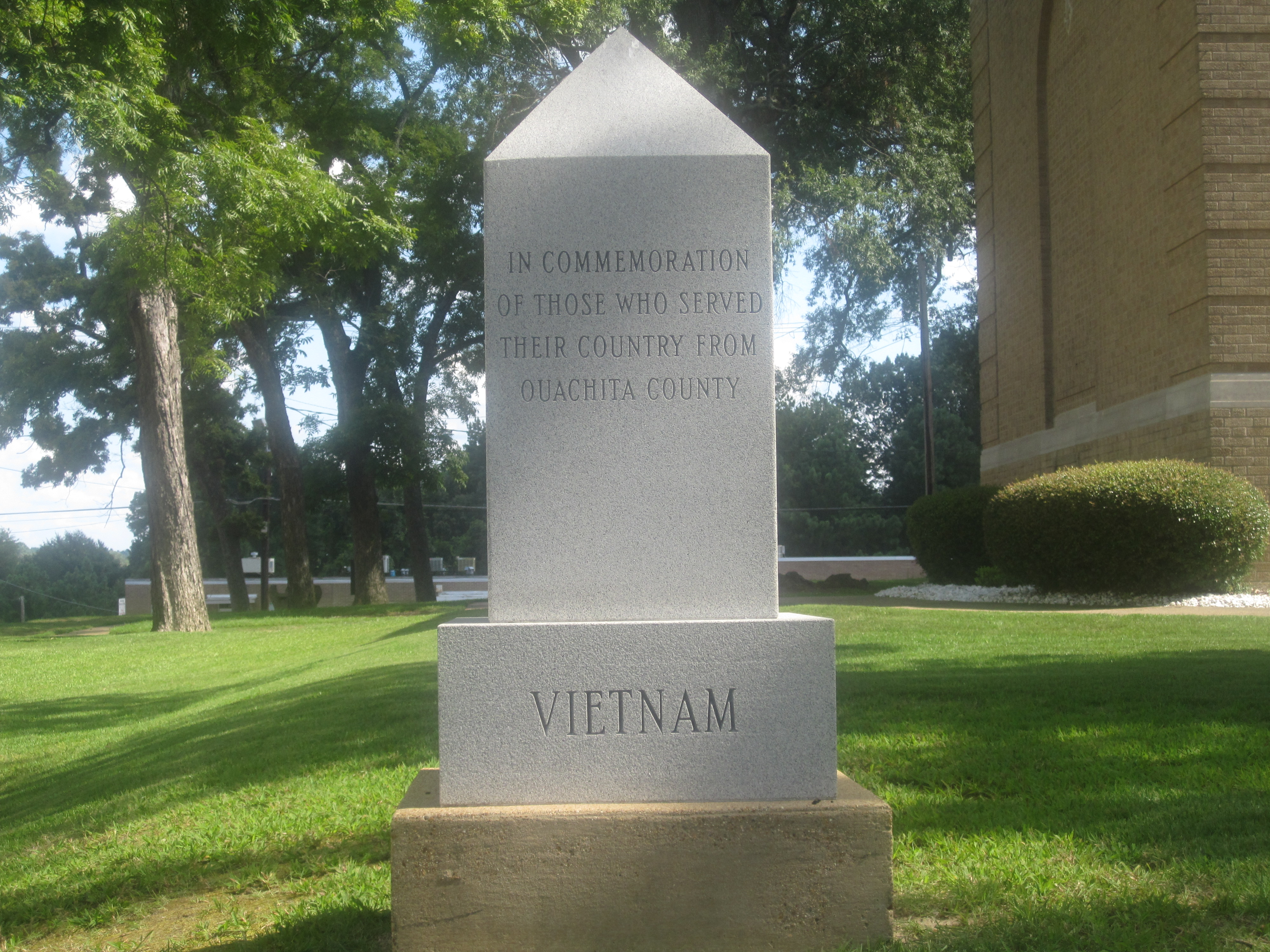
Vietnam Veterans Monument

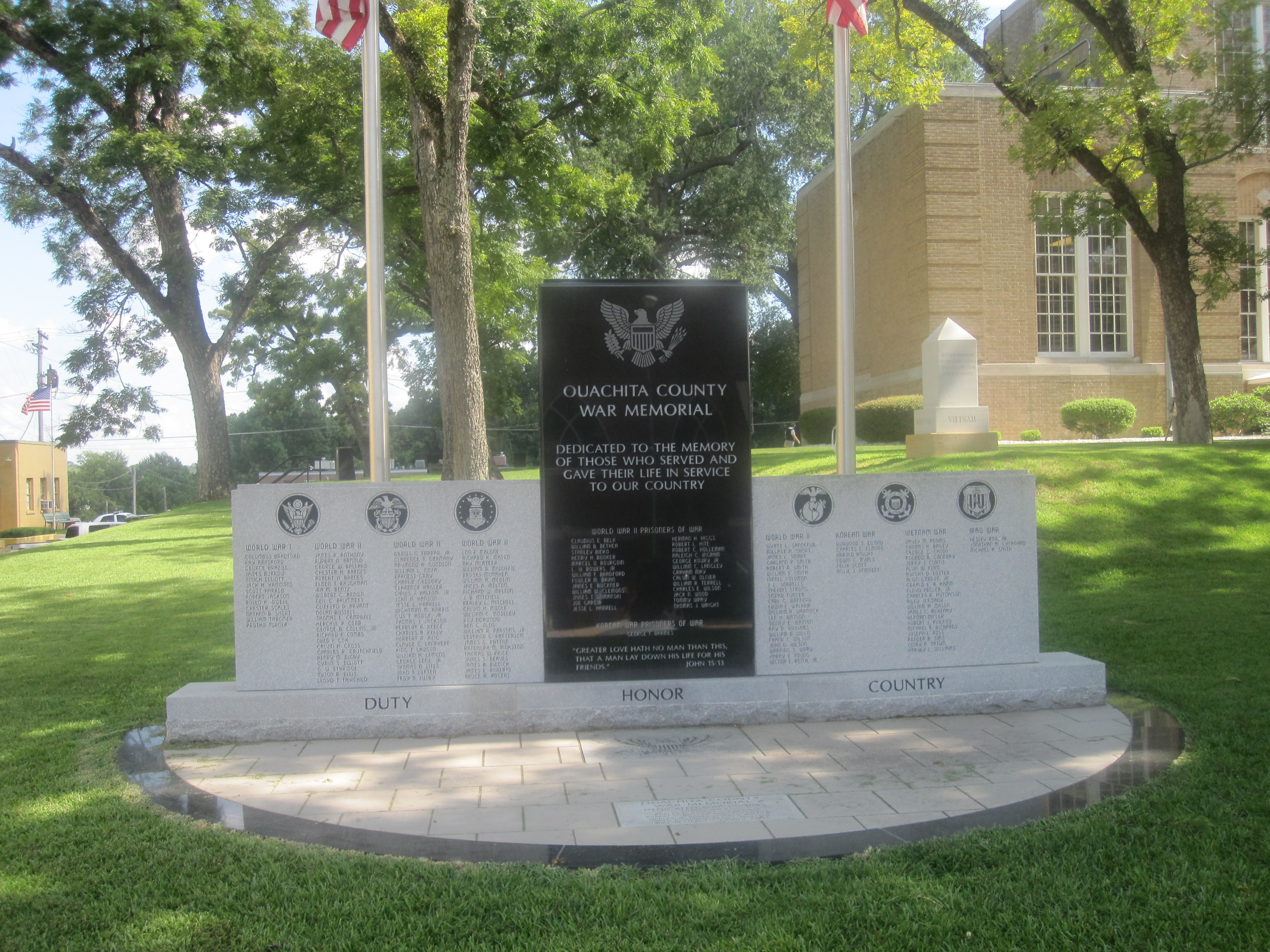
Ouachita County War Memorial

== See also ==
- List of lakes in Ouachita County, Arkansas
- National Register of Historic Places listings in Ouachita County, Arkansas
- USS Ouachita County (LST-1071)
