= White Oak Lake State Park =

White Oak Lake
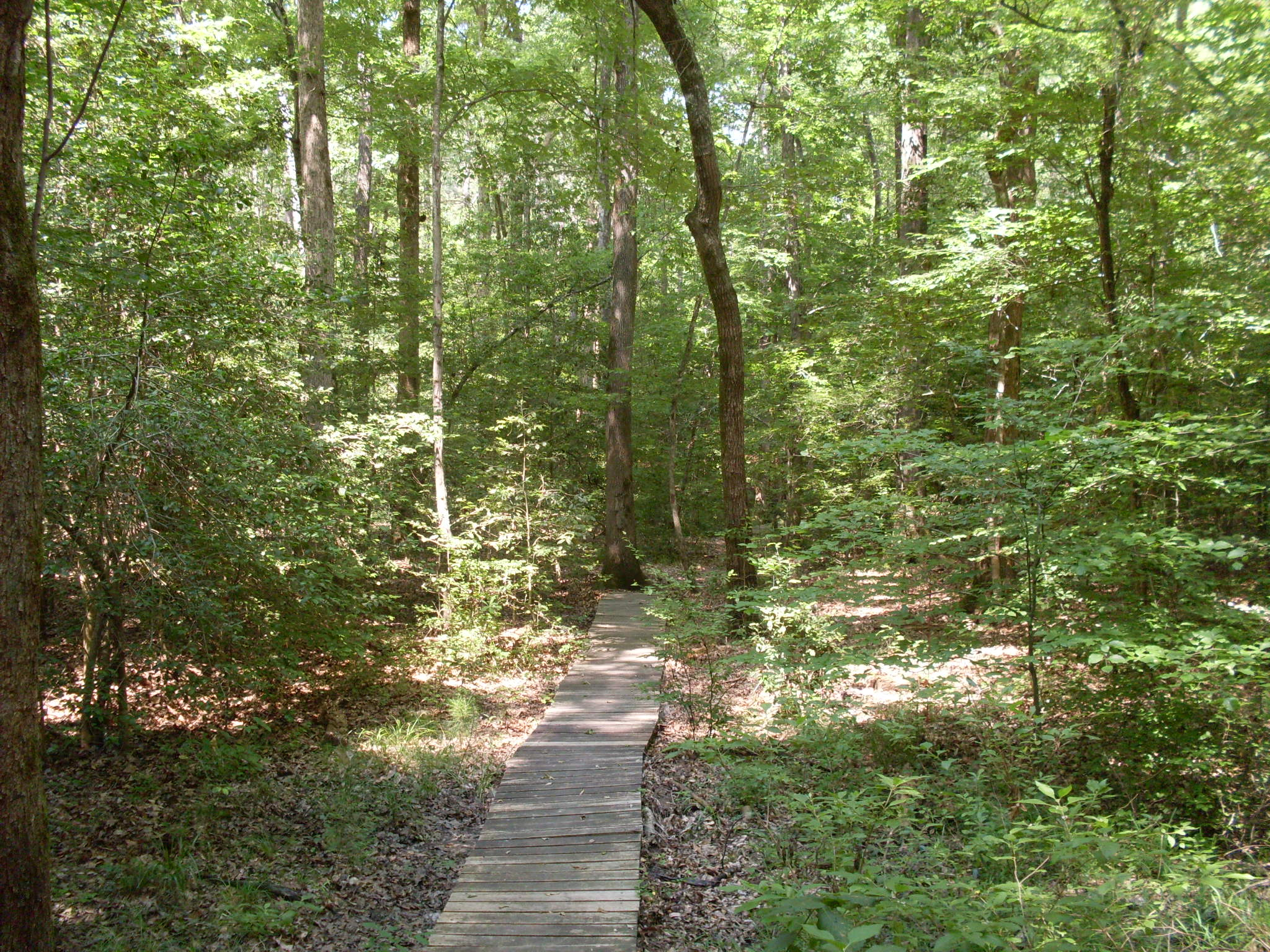
- Beech Ridge Trail, 2008

- Location within Arkansas
- Location: Nevada / Ouachita counties, Arkansas, United States
- Coordinates: 33°42′07″N 93°05′26″W
- Lake type: reservoir
- Basin countries: United States
- Surface area: 2,776 acres (1,123 ha)
- Surface elevation: 197 ft (60 m)

White Oak Lake State Park is a state park in the southwest of the U.S. state of Arkansas, a few miles from Bluff City. The reservoir sits surrounded by tall pine trees, giving it a rich, wooded beauty. The state park offers camping facilities, hiking and mountain biking trails, boat and bicycle rentals, as well as playground facilities.

Because White Oak Lake was created in a woodland area, the lake features many submerged dead trees. These serve as excellent cover for bass, crappie, and bream, all of which are reasonably abundant in the lake. Catfish also thrive at the lake.

The park features hiking trails of easy to moderate difficulty, of which the Beech Ridge and Silver Maples trails give a good understanding of the "West Gulf Coastal Plain forest" setting. Deer and heron sightings are common at the park, while some bald eagles winter there.

White Oak Lake is reasonably popular with local residents, but its location in a part of Arkansas with few tourists keeps it from undue crowding or traffic. White Oak Lake is near the Poison Springs Battleground State Park, a Civil War battlefield.

Completed in 1961, the lake is 19 miles southeast of Prescott, and 15 miles northwest of Camden, off State Highways 387 and 24. It is the second largest lake created by the Arkansas Game and Fish Commission, at 1,656 acres (670 ha).

== See also ==
- List of Arkansas dams and reservoirs
- List of Arkansas state parks
