= Nevada County, Arkansas =

County in Arkansas, United States

- County
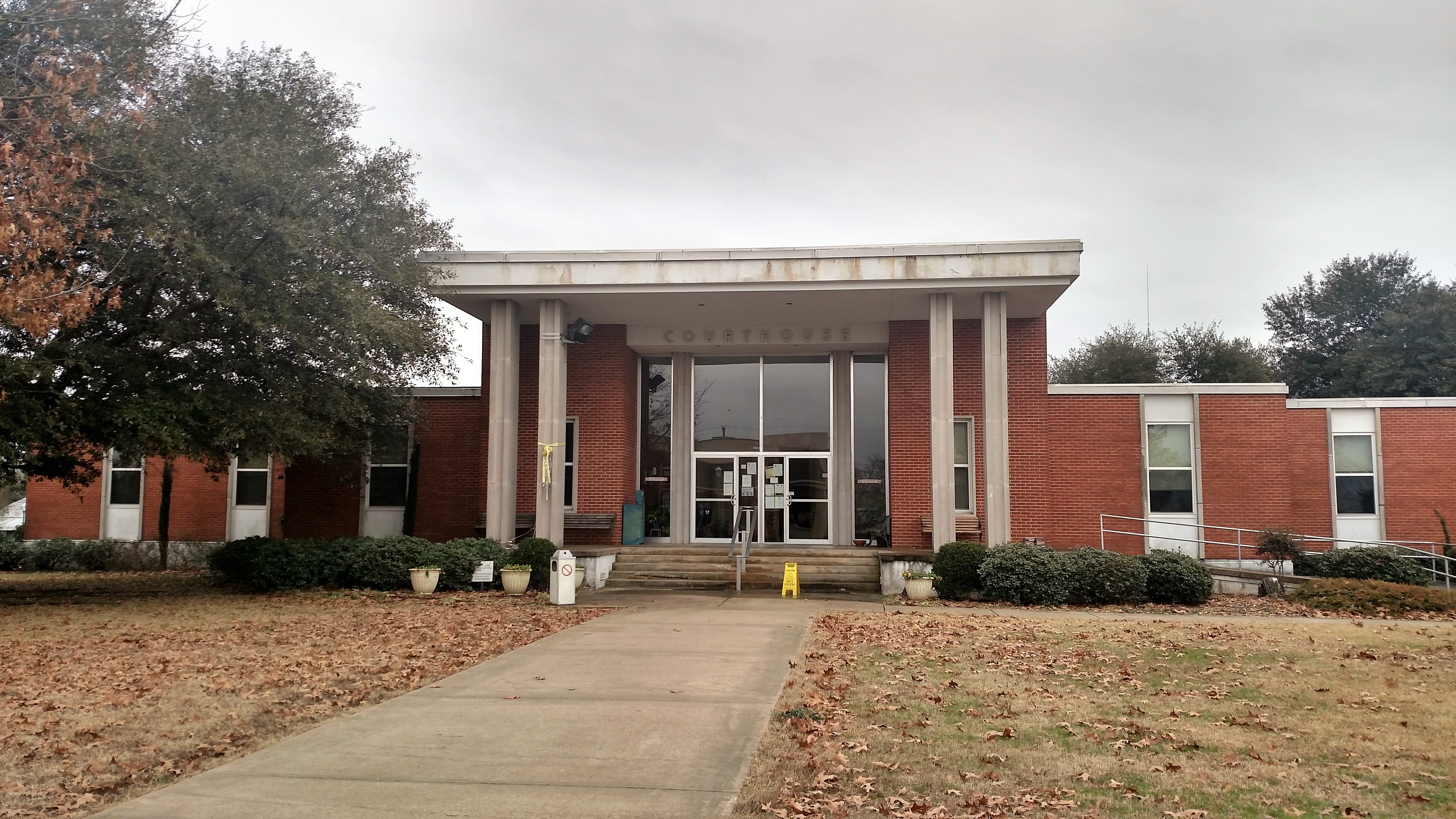
- Nevada County Courthouse in Prescott

- Location within the U.S. state of Arkansas
- Coordinates: 33°39′40″N 93°18′03″W
- Country: United States
- State: Arkansas
- Founded: March 20, 1871
- Named for: state of Nevada
- Seat: Prescott
- Largest city: Prescott

Area
  - Total: 621 sq mi (1,610 km^{2})
  - Land: 618 sq mi (1,600 km^{2})
  - Water: 2.8 sq mi (7.3 km^{2}) 0.5%

Population (2020)
  - Total: 8,310
  - Estimate (2025): 7,942 ▼
  - Density: 13.4/sq mi (5.19/km^{2})
- Time zone: UTC−6 (Central)
  - Summer (DST): UTC−5 (CDT)
- Congressional district: 4th
- Website: nevadacounty.arkansas.gov

Nevada County (/nəˈveɪ.də/ nə-VAY-də) is a county located in the southwestern part of the U.S. state of Arkansas. As of the 2020 Census, the population was 8,310, less than half of its peak in 1920. The county seat is Prescott. Nevada County is Arkansas's 63rd county, formed during the Reconstruction era on March 20, 1871, from portions of Hempstead, Ouachita and Columbia counties. It was named after the state of Nevada because of the perceived similarity between their physical shapes; the Arkansas county's shape, inverted, roughly follows the same outline as the state's boundary. It is an alcohol prohibition or dry county.

== History ==
This area was historically occupied by members of the Caddoan Confederacy, whose territory extended into present-day Texas and Louisiana. They settled along the waterways, using them for transportation and fishing. Colonial French and later European-American settlers also took over lands along the waterways, which formed their basic transportation routes well into the 19th century. After the Congress repealed Prohibition in the early 20th century, Nevada County voted to retain it and the county is still "dry."

== Geography ==
According to the U.S. Census Bureau, the county has a total area of 621 square miles (1,610 km^{2}), of which 618 square miles (1,600 km^{2}) is land and 2.8 square miles (7.3 km^{2}) (0.5%) is water. The county is bounded on the north by the Little Missouri River, a branch of the Ouachita River, and drained by several tributaries of that stream and of Red River. Nevada County is alternately considered as part of the greater regions of South Arkansas or Southwest Arkansas.

=== Major highways ===
- Interstate 30
- U.S. Highway 67
- U.S. Highway 278
- U.S. Highway 371
- Highway 19
- Highway 24
- Highway 29
- Highway 32
- Highway 51
- Highway 53
- Highway 76
- Highway 200
- Highway 299
- Highway 332
- Highway 355
- Highway 368
- Highway 372
- Highway 387

=== Adjacent counties ===
- Clark County (northeast)
- Ouachita County (east)
- Columbia County (south)
- Lafayette County (southwest)
- Hempstead County (west)
- Pike County (northwest)

== Demographics ==
The population declined by more than half from 1920 to 1970, due to mechanization of agriculture and the decline of the lumber industry causing loss of jobs. In addition, blacks left in the Great Migration to midwestern and western industrial cities, where they found better work and less social oppression.

Historical population
Census	Pop.	Note	%±
1880	12,959		—
1890	14,832		14.5%
1900	16,609		12.0%
1910	19,344		16.5%
1920	21,934		13.4%
1930	20,407		−7.0%
1940	19,869		−2.6%
1950	14,781		−25.6%
1960	10,700		−27.6%
1970	10,111		−5.5%
1980	11,097		9.8%
1990	10,101		−9.0%
2000	9,955		−1.4%
2010	8,997		−9.6%
2020	8,310		−7.6%
2025 (est.)	7,942	▼	−4.4%
U.S. Decennial Census; 1790–1960 1900–1990; 1990–2000 2010

=== 2020 census ===
As of the 2020 census, the county had a population of 8,310. The median age was 44.2 years. 22.6% of residents were under the age of 18 and 20.9% of residents were 65 years of age or older. For every 100 females there were 97.3 males, and for every 100 females age 18 and over there were 92.1 males age 18 and over.

The racial makeup of the county was 62.8% White, 29.4% Black or African American, 0.5% American Indian and Alaska Native, 0.5% Asian, <0.1% Native Hawaiian and Pacific Islander, 2.1% from some other race, and 4.6% from two or more races. Hispanic or Latino residents of any race comprised 4.3% of the population.

<0.1% of residents lived in urban areas, while 100.0% lived in rural areas.

There were 3,427 households in the county, of which 28.3% had children under the age of 18 living in them. Of all households, 42.3% were married-couple households, 21.1% were households with a male householder and no spouse or partner present, and 32.0% were households with a female householder and no spouse or partner present. About 31.6% of all households were made up of individuals and 14.1% had someone living alone who was 65 years of age or older.

There were 4,298 housing units, of which 20.3% were vacant. Among occupied housing units, 72.5% were owner-occupied and 27.5% were renter-occupied. The homeowner vacancy rate was 1.5% and the rental vacancy rate was 10.0%.

=== 2000 census ===
As of the 2000 United States census, there were 9,955 people, 3,893 households, and 2,721 families residing in the county. The population density was 16 people per square mile (6.2 people/km^{2}). There were 4,751 housing units at an average density of 8 per square mile (3.1/km^{2}). The racial makeup of the county was 66.90% White, 31.18% Black or African American, 0.38% Native American, 0.06% Asian, 0.85% from other races, and 0.62% from two or more races. 1.52% of the population were Hispanic or Latino of any race.

There were 3,893 households, out of which 31.40% had children under the age of 18 living with them, 51.90% were married couples living together, 14.00% had a female householder with no husband present, and 30.10% were non-families. 27.80% of all households were made up of individuals, and 13.70% had someone living alone who was 65 years of age or older. The average household size was 2.48 and the average family size was 3.02.

In the county, the population was spread out, with 25.20% under the age of 18, 8.70% from 18 to 24, 26.10% from 25 to 44, 23.80% from 45 to 64, and 16.10% who were 65 years of age or older. The median age was 38 years. For every 100 females, there were 94.40 males. For every 100 females age 18 and over, there were 89.90 males.

The median income for a household in the county was $26,962, and the median income for a family was $33,095. Males had a median income of $27,888 versus $17,920 for females. The per capita income for the county was $14,184. About 18.30% of families and 22.80% of the population were below the poverty line, including 28.00% of those under age 18 and 27.10% of those age 65 or over.

== Government ==
=== Government ===
The county government is a constitutional body granted specific powers by the Constitution of Arkansas and the Arkansas Code. The quorum court is the legislative branch of the county government and controls all spending and revenue collection. Representatives are called justices of the peace and are elected from county districts every even-numbered year. The number of districts in a county vary from nine to fifteen, and district boundaries are drawn by the county election commission. The Nevada County Quorum Court has nine members. Presiding over quorum court meetings is the county judge, who serves as the chief operating officer of the county. The county judge is elected at-large and does not vote in quorum court business, although capable of vetoing quorum court decisions.

Nevada County, Arkansas Elected countywide officials
Position	Officeholder	Party
County Judge	Mike Otwell	Republican
County Clerk	Tammie Ann Rose	Republican
Circuit Clerk	Rita Reyenga	Republican
Sheriff/Collector	Danny Martin	Republican
Treasurer	C. Lorelei Hale	(Unknown)
Assessor	Pam Box	Independent
Coroner	David Gummeson	Republican

The composition of the Quorum Court following the 2024 elections is 5 Democrats and 4 Republicans. Justices of the Peace (members) of the Quorum Court following the elections are:

- District 1: Dennis Pruitt (R) of Prescott
- District 2: Willie Wilson (D) of Prescott
- District 3: Patricia Grimes (D) of Prescott
- District 4: James Roy Cornelius (R) of Prescott
- District 5: Eric Jackson (R) of Prescott
- District 6: Herbert Coleman (D) of Rosston
- District 7: Regina Irizarry (R) of Buckner
- District 8: Todd Butler (R) of Emmet
- District 9: Tommy Poole (R) of Prescott

Additionally, the townships of Nevada County are entitled to elect their own respective constables, as set forth by the Constitution of Arkansas. Constables are largely of historical significance as they were used to keep the peace in rural areas when travel was more difficult. The township constables as of the 2024 elections are:

- Alabama: Nelson Irizarry (D)
- Albany: Micah Stockton (R)
- Emmet: Ryan McBrayer (R)

=== Politics ===
Historically, the county was a stronghold of the Greenback Party, controlling county offices from 1880 to 1884, and later a stronghold for the Populist Party in the 1890s.

Prior to 2000, Nevada County was considered an "ancestral" Democratic-voting county, with exceptions for the 1968 George Wallace campaign and the 1972 and 1984 landslides of Richard Nixon and Ronald Reagan, respectively.

United States presidential election results for Nevada County, Arkansas
Year	Republican		Democratic		Third party(ies)	
Year	No.	%	No.	%	No.	%
1896	469	21.82%	1,669	77.66%	11	0.51%
1900	744	47.42%	732	46.65%	93	5.93%
1904	556	36.48%	585	38.39%	383	25.13%
1908	784	39.92%	890	45.32%	290	14.77%
1912	322	24.96%	607	47.05%	361	27.98%
1916	657	32.32%	1,376	67.68%	0	0.00%
1920	1,292	50.65%	1,220	47.82%	39	1.53%
1924	386	29.90%	719	55.69%	186	14.41%
1928	946	43.16%	1,242	56.66%	4	0.18%
1932	197	7.68%	2,358	91.97%	9	0.35%
1936	204	13.96%	1,252	85.69%	5	0.34%
1940	224	13.74%	1,399	85.83%	7	0.43%
1944	415	23.43%	1,353	76.40%	3	0.17%
1948	202	11.40%	1,140	64.33%	430	24.27%
1952	1,037	34.41%	1,972	65.43%	5	0.17%
1956	1,039	35.30%	1,871	63.57%	33	1.12%
1960	937	34.06%	1,605	58.34%	209	7.60%
1964	1,406	38.79%	2,190	60.41%	29	0.80%
1968	840	21.42%	1,308	33.36%	1,773	45.22%
1972	2,513	68.07%	1,179	31.93%	0	0.00%
1976	1,163	27.24%	3,101	72.64%	5	0.12%
1980	1,697	38.22%	2,631	59.26%	112	2.52%
1984	2,352	56.65%	1,783	42.94%	17	0.41%
1988	1,714	49.55%	1,732	50.07%	13	0.38%
1992	1,217	30.83%	2,242	56.79%	489	12.39%
1996	976	26.74%	2,279	62.44%	395	10.82%
2000	1,796	48.05%	1,867	49.95%	75	2.01%
2004	1,752	50.39%	1,694	48.72%	31	0.89%
2008	2,062	56.73%	1,474	40.55%	99	2.72%
2012	1,996	58.98%	1,314	38.83%	74	2.19%
2016	2,000	61.61%	1,157	35.64%	89	2.74%
2020	2,133	63.52%	1,076	32.04%	149	4.44%
2024	2,002	68.87%	849	29.21%	56	1.93%

== Communities ==
=== Cities ===
- Emmet
- Prescott (county seat)

=== Towns ===
- Bluff City
- Bodcaw
- Cale
- Rosston
- Willisville
- Falcon

=== Census-designated place ===
- Reader

=== Townships ===
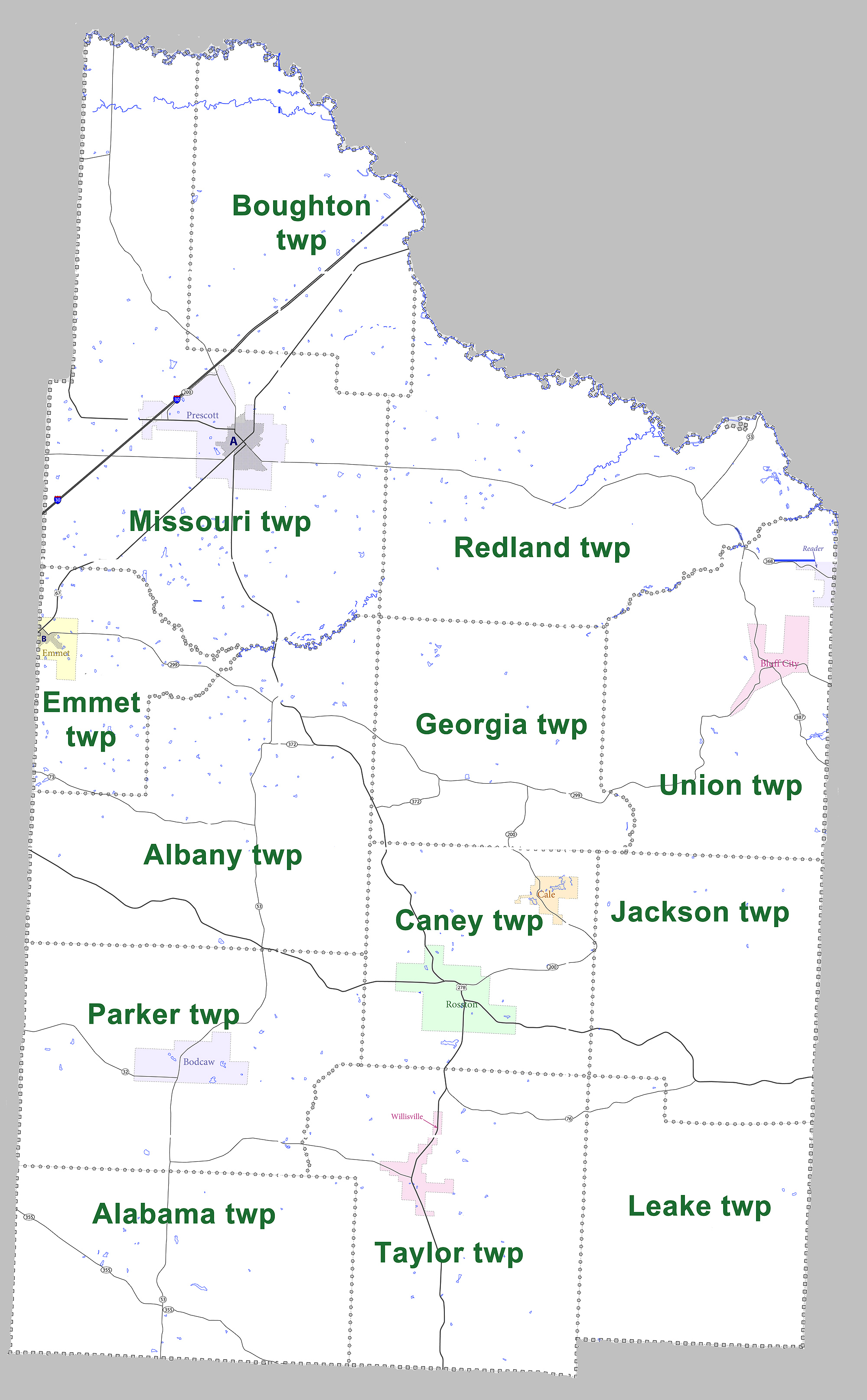
Townships in Nevada County, Arkansas as of 2010

Townships in Arkansas are the divisions of a county. Each township includes unincorporated areas; some may have incorporated cities or towns within part of their boundaries. Arkansas townships have limited purposes in modern times. However, the United States census does list Arkansas population based on townships (sometimes referred to as "county subdivisions" or "minor civil divisions"). Townships are also of value for historical purposes in terms of genealogical research. Each town or city is within one or more townships in an Arkansas county based on census maps and publications. The townships of Nevada County are listed below; listed in parentheses are the cities, towns, and/or census-designated places that are fully or partially inside the township.

- Alabama
- Albany
- Boughton
- Caney (Cale, Rosston)
- Emmet (Emmet)
- Georgia
- Jackson
- Leake
- Missouri (Prescott)
- Parker (Bodcaw)
- Redland
- Taylor (Willisville)
- Union (Bluff City, Reader)

== See also ==
- Camp Bragg (Arkansas)
- List of lakes in Nevada County, Arkansas
- National Register of Historic Places listings in Nevada County, Arkansas
