= Poison Springs Battleground State Park =

Battlefield in Arkansas, United States

Poison Springs State Park
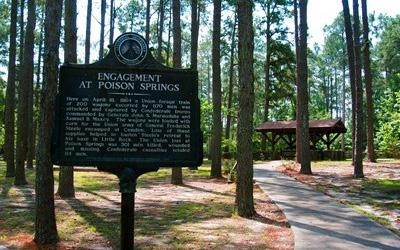

- Location in Arkansas Poison Springs Battleground State Park (the United States)
- 33°38′20″N 93°00′16″W
- Location: Ouachita County, Arkansas
- Nearest city: Chidester, Arkansas

History
- Built: 1961

U.S. National Register of Historic Places
- Official name: Poison Spring State Park
- Designated: December 3, 1969
- Reference no.: 69000036

U.S. National Historic Landmark District – Contributing property
- Official name: Poison Spring Battlefield
- Designated: April 19, 1994
- Part of: Camden Expedition Sites National Historic Landmark
- Reference no.: 94001182

Poison Springs Battleground State Park is an Arkansas state park located southeast of Bluff City. It commemorates the Battle of Poison Spring in the American Civil War, which was part of the 1864 Camden Expedition, an element of a Union Army initiative to gain control of Shreveport, Louisiana, and get a foothold in Texas.

In the battle, which was fought on April 18, 1864, Confederates and Choctaw Indians attacked and overcame a supply wagon train of Union soldiers. The term "poison spring" arises from the apocryphal story that Confederate soldiers poisoned nearby springwater. The battle hastened the failure of the Camden expedition, and garnered notoriety for the slaughter of black Union soldiers from Kansas by the Confederate forces, which took no prisoners.

The site was listed on the National Register of Historic Places in 1969 as Poison Springs State Park, and, with other sites, is part of the Camden Expedition Sites National Historic Landmark. It was declared part of the National Historic Landmark in 1994.

== Description and administrative history ==
The park includes about 85 acres (34 ha) of land. It is located on both sides of Arkansas Highway 76, about 14 miles (23 km) northwest of Camden in Ouachita County. Highway 76 was constructed along the historic road that was used by the Union supply train when it was roadblocked and attacked by the Confederate force during the battle. The improved portion of the park, with a picnic area and interpretive signs, is located on the north side of the highway.

The battle, however, covered a much larger area, estimated at more than 9,000 acres (3,600 ha). The surrounding area is in roughly the same condition as it was at the time of the battle. The land that was then under cultivation has since been allowed to revert to forest.

The heavily wooded park features a small interpretive display and a shady trail. Sightings of deer and woodpeckers are common along the trail. The park provides an excellent example of the Gulf Coast forest region, consisting primarily of pine trees, but with some oak and with dogwood understory trees.

== See also ==
- List of Arkansas state parks
- List of National Historic Landmarks in Arkansas
- National Register of Historic Places listings in Ouachita County, Arkansas
