= Reader, Arkansas =

- Census-designated place
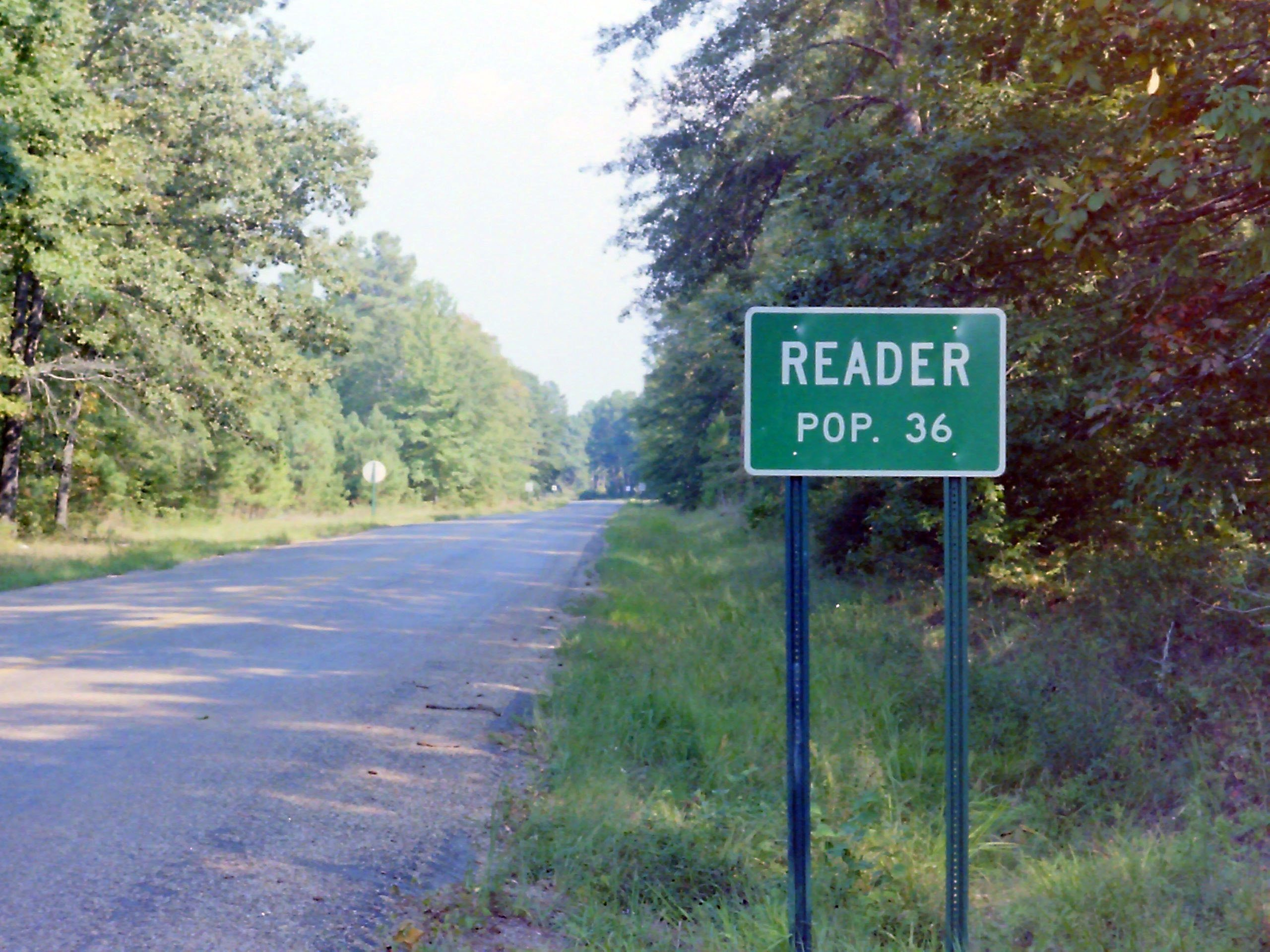
- Street sign in Reader

- Location in Ouachita County and the state of Arkansas
- Coordinates: 33°44′55″N 93°06′02″W
- Country: United States
- State: Arkansas
- Counties: Ouachita, Nevada

Area
  - Total: 2.34 sq mi (6.05 km^{2})
  - Land: 2.34 sq mi (6.05 km^{2})
  - Water: 0 sq mi (0.00 km^{2})
- Elevation: 197 ft (60 m)

Population (2020)
  - Total: 40
  - Density: 17.1/sq mi (6.61/km^{2})
- Time zone: UTC-6 (Central (CST))
  - Summer (DST): UTC-5 (CDT)
- FIPS code: 05-58400
- GNIS feature ID: 2612131

Reader is an unincorporated census-designated place in Nevada and Ouachita counties in the U.S. state of Arkansas. As of the 2010 census, its population is 66. Per the 2020 census, the population was 40.

The Nevada County portion of Reader is part of the Hope Micropolitan Statistical Area, while the Ouachita County portion is part of the Camden Micropolitan Statistical Area.

== Geography ==
According to the United States Census Bureau, the town had a total area of 2.3 mi^{2} (6.1 km^{2}), all land.

== Demographics ==
Historical population
Census	Pop.	Note	%±
1930	251		—
1940	145		−42.2%
1950	79		−45.5%
1960	86		8.9%
1970	143		66.3%
1980	127		−11.2%
1990	56		−55.9%
2000	82		46.4%
2010	66		−19.5%
2020	40		−39.4%
U.S. Decennial Census; 2010 2020

=== 2020 census ===
Reader CDP, Arkansas – Demographic Profile (NH = Non-Hispanic) Note: the US Census treats Hispanic/Latino as an ethnic category. This table excludes Latinos from the racial categories and assigns them to a separate category. Hispanics/Latinos may be of any race.
Race / Ethnicity	Pop 2010	Pop 2020	% 2010	% 2020
White alone (NH)	32	13	48.48%	32.50%
Black or African American alone (NH)	28	19	42.42%	47.50%
Native American or Alaska Native alone (NH)	0	1	0.00%	2.50%
Asian alone (NH)	5	1	7.58%	2.50%
Pacific Islander alone (NH)	0	0	0.00%	0.00%
Some Other Race alone (NH)	0	0	0.00%	0.00%
Mixed Race/Multi-Racial (NH)	1	2	1.52%	5.00%
Hispanic or Latino (any race)	0	4	0.00%	10.00%
Total	66	40	100.00%	100.00%

=== 2010 Census ===
As of the 2010 United States census, there were 66 people living in the CDP. The racial makeup of the CDP was 48.5% White, 42.4% Black, 7.6% Asian and 1.5% from two or more races.

As of the census of 2000, there were 82 people, 28 households, and 19 families living in the town. The population density was 35.0/mi^{2} (13.5/km^{2}). There were 43 housing units at an average density of 18.4/mi^{2} (7.1/km^{2}). The racial makeup of the town was 50.0% White and 50.0% Black or African American.

There were 28 households, out of which 57.1% had children under the age of 18 living with them, 42.9% were married couples living together, 14.3% had a female householder with no husband present, and 32.1% were non-families. 28.6% of all households were made up of individuals, and 21.4% had someone living alone who was 65 years of age or older. The average household size was 2.93 and the average family size was 3.53.

In the town the population was spread out, with 42.7% under the age of 18, 7.3% from 18 to 24, 31.7% from 25 to 44, 6.1% from 45 to 64, and 12.2% who were 65 years of age or older. The median age was 24 years. For every 100 females, there were 127.8 males. For every 100 females age 18 and over, there were 95.8 males.

The median income for a household in the town was $14,375, and the median income for a family was $14,583. Males had a median income of $25,938 versus $13,750 for females. The per capita income for the town was $9,037. There were 39.1% of families and 38.4% of the population living below the poverty line, including 42.9% of under eighteens and none of those over 64.

== Education ==
Public education for elementary and secondary school students in the Ouachita County section is available from Camden Fairview School District, which leads to graduation from Camden Fairview High School.

Residents in the Nevada County portion are zoned to the Prescott School District, which operates Prescott Elementary School, McRae Middle School, and Prescott High School.
