= Bluff City, Arkansas =

- Town
- Location of Bluff City in Nevada County, Arkansas.
- Coordinates: 33°43′30″N 93°07′38″W
- Country: United States
- State: Arkansas
- County: Nevada

Area
  - Total: 2.32 sq mi (6.02 km^{2})
  - Land: 2.32 sq mi (6.01 km^{2})
  - Water: 0 sq mi (0.00 km^{2})
- Elevation: 328 ft (100 m)

Population (2020)
  - Total: 118
  - Estimate (2025): 110 ▼
  - Density: 50.8/sq mi (19.62/km^{2})
- Time zone: UTC-6 (Central (CST))
  - Summer (DST): UTC-5 (CDT)
- ZIP code: 71722
- Area code: 870
- FIPS code: 05-07270
- GNIS feature ID: 2405287

Bluff City is an unincorporated town (no elected mayor) in Nevada County, Arkansas, United States. The population was 118 at the 2020 census. It is part of the Hope Micropolitan Statistical Area.

== Geography ==
According to the United States Census Bureau, the community has a total area of 2.3 square miles (6.0 km^{2}), all land.

== Demographics ==
Historical population
Census	Pop.	Note	%±
1970	244		—
1980	292		19.7%
1990	227		−22.3%
2000	158		−30.4%
2010	124		−21.5%
2020	118		−4.8%
2025 (est.)	110	▼	−6.8%
U.S. Decennial Census; 2014 Estimate

Bluff City, Arkansas – Racial and ethnic composition Note: the US Census treats Hispanic/Latino as an ethnic category. This table excludes Latinos from the racial categories and assigns them to a separate category. Hispanics/Latinos may be of any race.
Race / Ethnicity (NH = Non-Hispanic)	Pop 2000	Pop 2010	Pop 2020	% 2000	% 2010	% 2020
White alone (NH)	43	37	46	27.22%	29.84%	38.98%
Black or African American alone (NH)	113	85	67	71.52%	68.55%	56.78%
Native American or Alaska Native alone (NH)	2	0	0	1.27%	0.00%	0.00%
Asian alone (NH)	0	0	0	0.00%	0.00%	0.00%
Pacific Islander alone (NH)	0	0	0	0.00%	0.00%	0.00%
Some Other Race alone (NH)	0	0	0	0.00%	0.00%	0.00%
Mixed Race or Multi-Racial (NH)	0	2	2	0.00%	1.61%	1.69%
Hispanic or Latino (any race)	0	0	3	0.00%	0.00%	2.54%
Total	158	124	118	100.00%	100.00%	100.00%

As of the census of 2000, there were 158 people, 66 households, and 46 families residing in the town. The population density was 69.4 inhabitants per square mile (26.8/km^{2}). There were 90 housing units at an average density of 39.5 per square mile (15.3/km^{2}). The racial makeup of the town was 27.22% White, 71.52% Black or African American and 1.27% Native American.

There were 66 households, out of which 22.7% had children under the age of 18 living with them, 48.5% were married couples living together, 13.6% had a female householder with no husband present, and 30.3% were non-families. 28.8% of all households were made up of individuals, and 13.6% had someone living alone who was 65 years of age or older. The average household size was 2.39 and the average family size was 2.96.

In the town, the population was spread out, with 19.0% under the age of 18, 6.3% from 18 to 24, 24.7% from 25 to 44, 31.0% from 45 to 64, and 19.0% who were 65 years of age or older. The median age was 45 years. For every 100 females there were 129.0 males. For every 100 females age 18 and over, there were 103.2 males.

The median income for a household in the town was $25,500, and the median income for a family was $26,667. Males had a median income of $37,917 versus $20,000 for females. The per capita income for the town was $14,358. About 19.0% of families and 23.6% of the population were below the poverty line, including 33.3% of those under the age of eighteen and 17.4% of those 65 or over.

== Infrastructure ==
=== Highways ===
- Arkansas Highway 24
- Arkansas Highway 299
- Arkansas Highway 387
