= Chidester, Arkansas =

- City
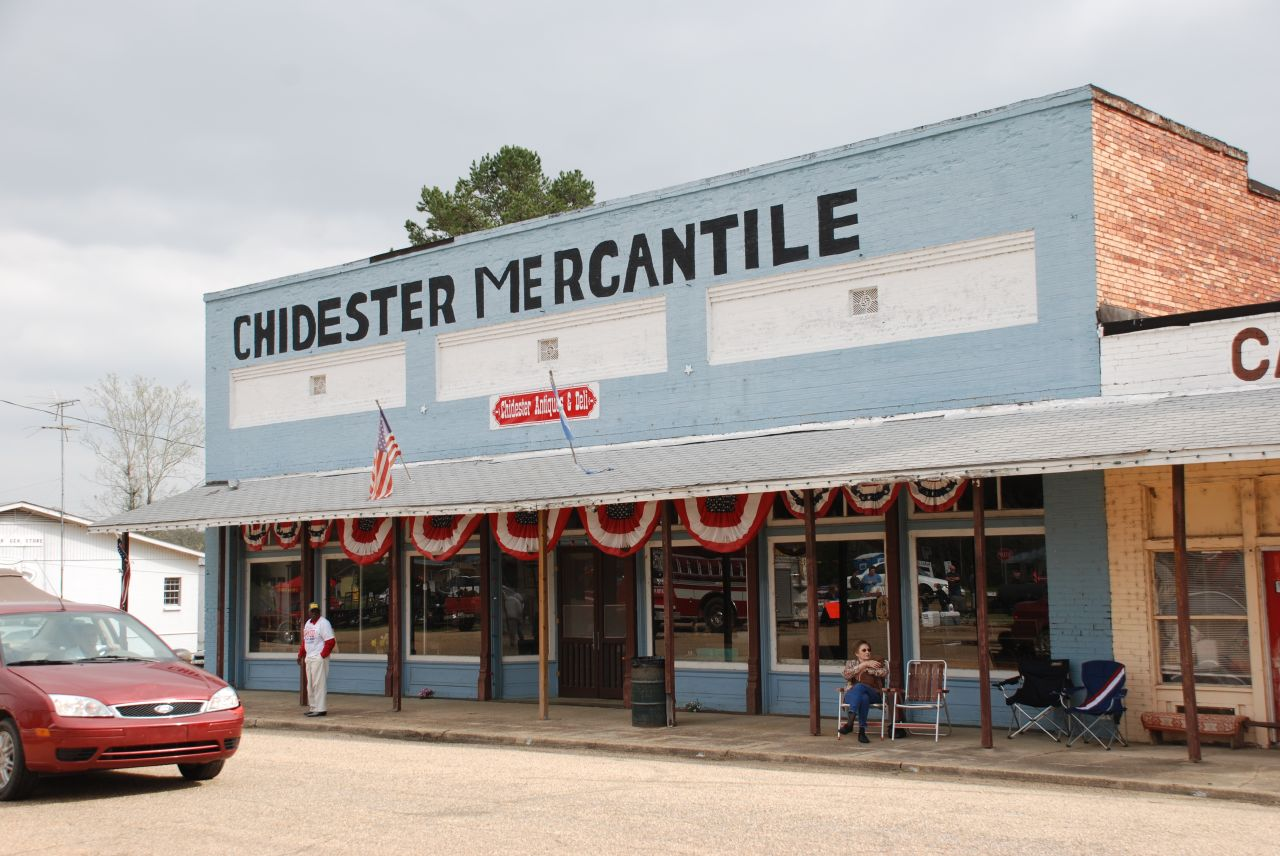
- Chidester Mercantile on Main St

- Location of Chidester in Ouachita County, Arkansas.
- Coordinates: 33°42′07″N 93°01′26″W
- Country: United States
- State: Arkansas
- County: Ouachita

Area
  - Total: 5.31 sq mi (13.76 km^{2})
  - Land: 5.31 sq mi (13.76 km^{2})
  - Water: 0 sq mi (0.00 km^{2})
- Elevation: 266 ft (81 m)

Population (2020)
  - Total: 253
  - Estimate (2025): 243 ▼
  - Density: 47.6/sq mi (18.38/km^{2})
- Time zone: UTC-6 (Central (CST))
  - Summer (DST): UTC-5 (CDT)
- ZIP code: 71726
- Area code: 870
- FIPS code: 05-13750
- GNIS feature ID: 2404046

Chidester (/tʃɪ.dɪ.stər/ CHIH-di-stir) is a city in northwest Ouachita County, Arkansas, United States. The population was 253 at the 2020 census. It is part of the Camden Micropolitan Statistical Area. It was founded in 1880 and incorporated on February 14, 1906.

== Geography ==
According to the United States Census Bureau, the city has a total area of 5.3 square miles (14 km^{2}), all land.

=== Climate ===
The climate in this area is characterized by hot, humid summers and generally mild to cool winters. According to the Köppen Climate Classification system, Chidester has a humid subtropical climate, abbreviated "Cfa" on climate maps.

== Demographics ==
Historical population
Census	Pop.	Note	%±
1910	211		—
1920	280		32.7%
1930	399		42.5%
1940	508		27.3%
1950	425		−16.3%
1960	348		−18.1%
1970	232		−33.3%
1980	342		47.4%
1990	489		43.0%
2000	335		−31.5%
2010	287		−14.3%
2020	253		−11.8%
2025 (est.)	243	▼	−4.0%
U.S. Decennial Census; 2014 Estimate

=== 2020 census ===
Race / Ethnicity (NH = Non-Hispanic)	Pop 2000	Pop 2010	Pop 2020	% 2000	% 2010	% 2020
White alone (NH)	124	120	115	37.01%	41.81%	45.45%
Black or African American alone (NH)	209	165	129	62.39%	57.49%	50.99%
Native American or Alaska Native alone (NH)	1	1	0	0.30%	0.35%	0.00%
Asian alone (NH)	0	0	0	0.00%	0.00%	0.00%
Native Hawaiian or Pacific Islander alone (NH)	0	0	0	0.00%	0.00%	0.00%
Other race alone (NH)	0	0	2	0.00%	0.00%	0.79%
Mixed race or Multiracial (NH)	1	1	4	0.30%	0.35%	1.58%
Hispanic or Latino (any race)	0	0	3	0.00%	0.00%	1.19%
Total	335	287	253	100.00%	100.00%	100.00%

As of the 2020 United States census, there were 253 people, 112 households, and 66 families residing in the city.

=== 2010 census ===
As of the 2010 United States census, there were 287 people living in the city. The racial makeup of the city was 57.5% Black, 41.8% White, 0.3% Native American and 0.3% from two or more races.

=== 2000 census ===
As of the census of 2000, there were 335 people, 142 households, and 94 families living in the city. The population density was 62.9 inhabitants per square mile (24.3/km^{2}). There were 182 housing units at an average density of 34.2 per square mile (13.2/km^{2}). The racial makeup of the city was 37.01% White, 62.39% Black or African American, 0.30% Native American, and 0.30% from two or more races.

There were 142 households, out of which 17.6% had children under the age of 18 living with them, 43.7% were married couples living together, 16.2% had a female householder with no husband present, and 33.8% were non-families. 30.3% of all households were made up of individuals, and 16.2% had someone living alone who was 65 years of age or older. The average household size was 2.36 and the average family size was 2.89.

In the city, the population was spread out, with 20.9% under the age of 18, 8.1% from 18 to 24, 22.7% from 25 to 44, 25.4% from 45 to 64, and 23.0% who were 65 years of age or older. The median age was 44 years. For every 100 females, there were 87.2 males. For every 100 females age 18 and over, there were 82.8 males.

The median income for a household in the city was $21,397, and the median income for a family was $29,000. Males had a median income of $27,656 versus $20,250 for females. The per capita income for the city was $13,425. About 21.8% of families and 27.3% of the population were below the poverty line, including 42.4% of those under age 18 and 20.8% of those age 65 or over.

== Education ==
Public education for elementary and secondary school students is available from Camden Fairview School District, which leads to graduation from Camden Fairview High School.

The Chidester School District consolidated into the Fairview School District on July 1, 1987; the Fairview district later became the Camden-Fairview School District as it had absorbed the Camden School District on October 16, 1990.

Previously the Camden Fairview district operated Chidester Elementary School. It occupied the former Chidester Public School, a high school building, and was established in 1987. Its school facility was built in 1968.
