= Arkansas Highway 19 =

State highway in Arkansas, United States

Highway 19

Route information
- Maintained by ArDOT
- Existed: 1926–present

Section 1
- Length: 18.05 mi (29.05 km)
- South end: LA 159 at the Louisiana state line near Shongaloo, LA
- North end: US 79B in Magnolia

Section 2
- Length: 24.73 mi (39.80 km)
- South end: US 371 in Prescott
- Major intersections: I-30 / AR 200 in Prescott
- North end: Beacon Hill Road at Lake Greeson

Location
- Country: United States
- State: Arkansas
- Counties: Columbia, Nevada, Pike

Highway system
- Arkansas Highway System; Interstate; US; State; Business; Spurs; Suffixed; Scenic; Heritage
← AR 18	→ AR 20

Arkansas Highway 19 (AR 19) is a designation for two state highways in South Arkansas. One segment of 18.05 miles (29.05 km) runs from the Louisiana state line north to U.S. Route 79B (US 79B) in Magnolia. A second segment of 24.73 miles (39.80 km) runs north from US 371 north across Interstate 30 (I-30) to Narrows Dam at Lake Greeson.

== Route description ==
=== Louisiana to Magnolia ===
Highway 19 begins at the Louisiana state line as a continuation of Louisiana Highway 159 and runs north to serve as the western terminus for Highway 98 at Walkerville and later the eastern terminus of Highway 160 at Macedonia. The route continues northeast into Magnolia, where the route terminates at US 79B.

=== Prescott to Lake Greeson ===
The route begins in Prescott at US 371 in the northwest corner of town and runs northwest to meet Highway 200, which is a frontage road for I-30. After the I-30 interchange, Highway 19 continues north to intersect Highway 29 before entering Pike County, continuing north to Delight. In Delight, the route begins a westbound overlap with Highway 26 for approximately 12 miles (19 km) to Murfreesboro. In Murfreesboro, Highway 19 splits and runs north to give access to the Greeson Wildlife Management Area, Riverside Use Area, and Narrows Dam Use Area. The route terminates at Narrows Dam at Lake Greeson, where it continues as Beacon Hill Road.

== History ==

Highway 19 was one of the original state highways, designated in 1926. The route began where US 79 currently crosses the Louisiana state line, and ran north along present-day US 79 to Magnolia. Upon designation, the highway continued north to Prescott via Waldo and Rosston, roughly along today's alignment of US 371 between the communities. In Prescott, the route began a short overlap with Highway 24 to the northwest before splitting and terminating at Highway 26 in Delight. By 1929, Highway 19 was truncated to Highway 26 in Prescott and between May 1934 and April 1935, Highway 19 was replaced by US 79 from Louisiana to Magnolia. Between 1938 and 1939, the northern terminus was extended north to its original terminus in Prescott, and the southern terminus was extended along the route's current alignment to the Louisiana state line along the former Highway 3.

Upon completion of Narrows Dam in 1951, a paved road was built to the structure from Murfreesboro, but was not initially designated a state highway. By 1953, the road had received the Highway 19 designation it carries today. It is the fact that Highway 26 formerly served as a northern terminus that possibly explains why Highway 26, not Highway 19, is the primary route from Delight to Murfreesboro despite having a lower number.

== Major intersections ==
Mile markers reset at concurrencies.

County	Location	mi	km	Destinations	Notes
Columbia		0.00	0.00	LA 159 south – Shongaloo, Minden	Continuation into Louisiana
Columbia	Walkerville	5.22	8.40	AR 98 east – Emerson	Western terminus of AR 98
Columbia	Macedonia	11.20	18.02	AR 160 west – Taylor	Eastern terminus of AR 160
Columbia	Magnolia	18.05	29.05	US 79B (Jackson Avenue) to US 79	Northern terminus
Gap in route
Nevada	Prescott	0.00	0.00	US 371 (West Main Street / Greenlawn Street)	Southern terminus; former AR 24
Nevada	Prescott	1.60	2.57	AR 200 west	Eastern terminus of AR 200
Nevada	Prescott	1.80	2.90	I-30 – Texarkana, Little Rock	Exit 46 on I-30
Nevada		8.58	13.81	AR 29 south – Blevins	Northern terminus of AR 29
Pike		13.97	22.48	AR 29 north – Antoine	Southern terminus of AR 29
Pike		14.79	23.80	AR 301	
Pike	Delight	18.44	29.68	AR 26 east – Antoine	Southern end of AR 26 concurrency
Pike	Delight			AR 195 south – Pisgah	Northern terminus of AR 195
Pike				AR 379 north	Southern terminus of AR 379
Pike	Murfreesboro			AR 27 north to US 70 – Kirby	Southern end of AR 27 concurrency
Pike	Murfreesboro	0.00	0.00	AR 27 south (AR 26 west) – Nashville, Crater of Diamonds State Park	Northern end of AR 26/AR 27 concurrency
Pike		6.29	10.12	Beacon Hill Road – Narrows Dam	Continuation north
1.000 mi = 1.609 km; 1.000 km = 0.621 mi

== See also ==
- List of state highways in Arkansas
