= Arkansas Highway 27 =

State highway in Arkansas, United States

Highway 27

Route information
- Maintained by ArDOT
- Existed: 1926–present

Section 1
- Length: 58.30 mi (93.82 km)
- South end: US 59 / US 71 near Ben Lomond
- Major intersections: US 278 in Nashville; US 371 / AR 24 in Nashville; US 70 / AR 84 at Kirby
- North end: US 270 in Mount Ida

Section 2
- Length: 46.09 mi (74.17 km)
- South end: US 270 / AR 379 near Mount Ida
- North end: AR 10 in Danville

Section 3
- Length: 18.41 mi (29.63 km)
- South end: AR 10 in Danville
- North end: AR 7 / AR 22 in Dardanelle

Section 4
- Length: 71.98 mi (115.84 km)
- South end: AR 7 in Dover
- Major intersections: US 65 in Marshall
- North end: AR 14 at Harriet

Location
- Country: United States
- State: Arkansas
- Counties: Sevier, Howard, Hempstead, Pike, Montgomery, Yell, Pope, Van Buren, Searcy

Highway system
- Arkansas Highway System; Interstate; US; State; Business; Spurs; Suffixed; Scenic; Heritage
| ← AR 26 | → AR 28 |

Arkansas Highway 27 (AR 27) is a designation for four state highways in Arkansas. One segment of 58.30 miles (93.82 km) runs from US 59/US 71 west of Ben Lomond north to US 270 in Mount Ida. A second segment of 46.09 miles (74.17 km) runs from US 270 west of Mount Ida north to Highway 10 in Danville. A third segment of 18.41 miles (29.63 km) runs from Highway 10 in Danville north to Highway 7 in Dardanelle. A fourth segment of 71.98 miles (115.84 km) runs from Highway 7 in Dover north to Highway 14 at Harriet.

The designation also includes Highway 27B, a business route in Nashville, and Highway 27N, a former alternate route near Ben Lomond deleted in the 1990s. All highways are maintained by the Arkansas State Highway and Transportation Department (AHTD).

== Route description ==
=== Ben Lomond to Mount Ida ===
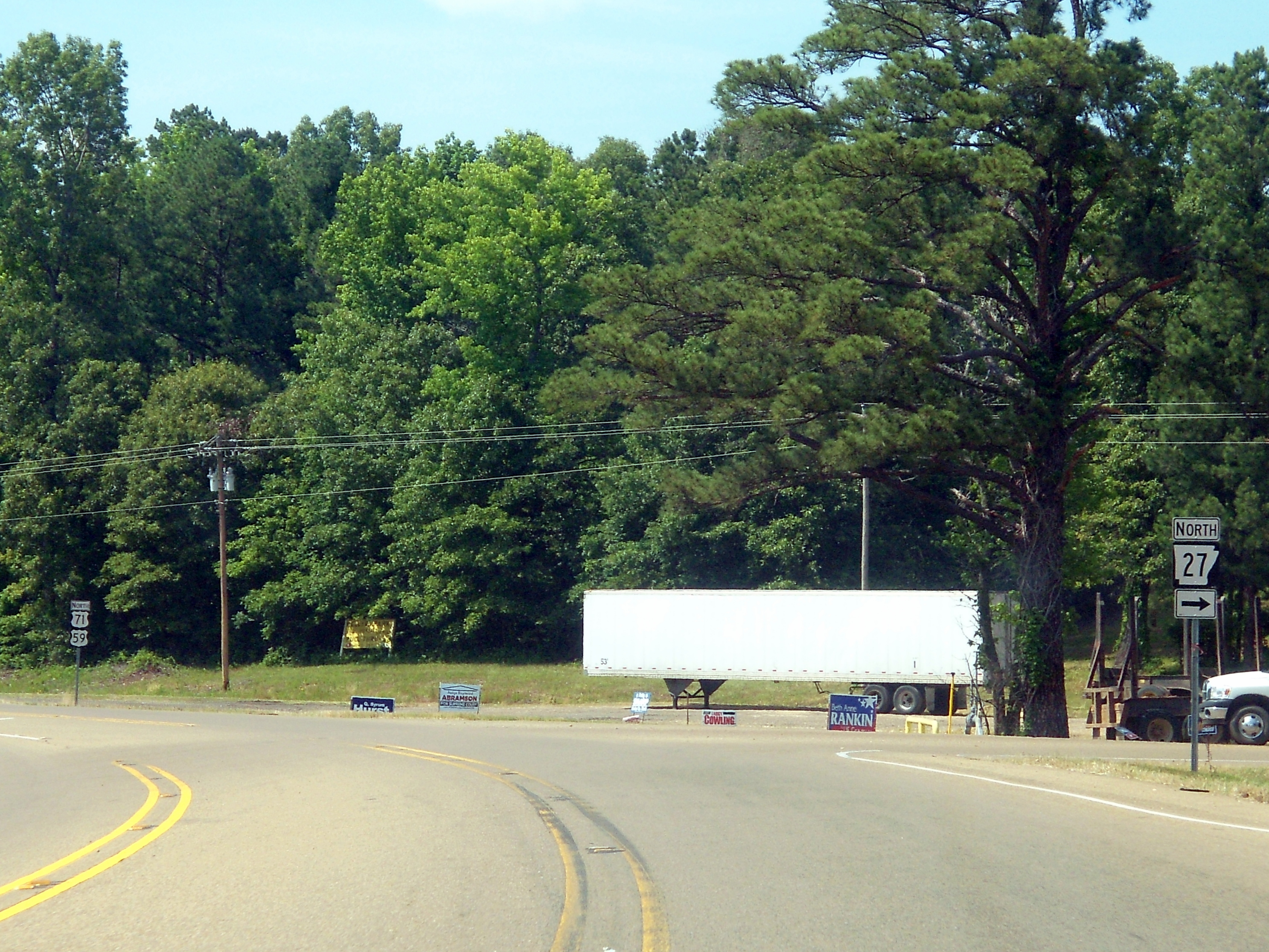
US 59/US 71 serves as the southern terminus of Highway 27 west of Ben Lomond.

Highway 27 begins at US 59/US 71 west of Ben Lomond. The route runs east, meeting Highway 317 before meeting Highway 355 in Mineral Springs. The route continues to Nashville where it meets US 278 and US 371/Highway 24. North of Nashville, Highway 27 meets Highway 26 until Murfreesboro, when it picks up Highway 19.

The route winds north to meet US 70/Highway 84 in Kirby. Highway 27 follows US 70 until Glenwood, when it meets Highway 8 and enters the Ouachita National Forest. The two routes run together until Norman. Highway 27 continues northeast to US 270 in Mount Ida, where it terminates.

=== Mount Ida to Danville ===
The route begins at US 270 and Highway 379 west of Mount Ida and runs north to Washita, where it meets Highway 298. Highway 27 eventually leaves the forest near Rover, which contains a junction with Highway 28. The route meets Highway 10 in Danville, where it terminates.

=== Danville to Dardanelle ===
The route begins at Highway 10 in Danville and runs north to Dardanelle, where it terminates at Highway 7 and Highway 22 on the south edge of town.

=== Dover to Harriet ===
The route begins at Highway 7 in Dover and winds northward for a stretch, eventually meeting Highway 16 and Highway 333 in rural Searcy County. Highway 27 continues northeast to meet US 65/Highway 74 in Marshall. After Marshall, the route trails north to Highway 14 in Harriet, where it terminates.

== History ==
Highway 27 was created during the 1926 Arkansas state highway numbering as an original state highway between Ben Lomond and Harriet. The segment between Highway 28 at Rover and Highway 10 in Danville was deleted in 1929, but it was restored in 1931.

Following construction of new terrain routes for Highway 7 and Highway 22, Highway 27 was truncated at the new alignment of Highway 7 in Dardanelle. This action separated the highway into its two present-day sections.

The highway was completed to Marshall on March 11, 1954, to Mount Ida on June 27, 1962., between Hector and Tilly on March 24, 1971, and between Ben Lomond and Mineral Springs on September 29, 1976.

== Major intersections ==
Mile markers reset at some concurrencies.

| County | Location | mi | km | Destinations | Notes |
|---|---|---|---|---|---|
| Sevier | | 0.00 | 0.00 | US 59 / US 71 – Ashdown, De Queen | Southern terminus |
| Sevier | Cowlingsville | 4.67 | 7.52 | AR 317 – Lockesburg, Brownstown | |
| Howard | Mineral Springs | 13.72 | 22.08 | AR 355 north | Southern end of AR 355 concurrency |
| Howard | Mineral Springs | 14.21 | 22.87 | AR 355 south – Fulton | Northern end of AR 355 concurrency |
| Howard | Nashville | 18.46 | 29.71 | AR 369 north – Industrial Park | Southern terminus of AR 369 |
| Howard | Nashville | 19.02 | 30.61 | AR 27B north – Business District | Southern terminus of AR 27B |
| Howard | Nashville | 20.70 | 33.31 | US 278 east / AR 27B south – Hope, Historic Washington State Park | Southern end of US 278 concurrency |
| Howard | Nashville | 22.15 | 35.65 | US 278 west / US 371 – Nashville Business District, Cossatot Community College University of Arkansas | Northern end of US 278 concurrency; former AR 24 |
| Hempstead | No major junctions | | | | |
| Pike | | 31.04 | 49.95 | AR 26 west – Highland | Southern end of AR 26 concurrency |
| Pike | Murfreesboro | 34.90 | 56.17 | AR 301 south – Billstown, Crater of Diamonds State Park | Northern terminus of AR 301 |
| Pike | Murfreesboro | 35.46 | 57.07 | AR 19 north – Narrows Dam, Lake Greeson | Southern end of AR 19 concurrency |
| Pike | Murfreesboro | 35.93 | 57.82 | AR 19 south / AR 26 east – Delight | Northern end of AR 19/AR 26 concurrency |
| Pike | | 39.13 | 62.97 | AR 379 south – Delight | Northern terminus of AR 379 |
| Pike | Kirby | 49.84 | 80.21 | US 70 west / AR 84 east – Lake Greeson, De Queen, Amity, Daisy State Park | Southern end of US 70 concurrency; western terminus of AR 84 |
| Pike | Salem | | | AR 84 west – Langley, Albert Pike Recreation Area | Eastern terminus of AR 84 |
| Pike | Glenwood | | | AR 8 east – Amity | Southern end of AR 8 concurrency |
| Pike | Glenwood | | | US 70 east – Hot Springs | Northern end of US 70 concurrency |
| Pike | Glenwood | | | US 70B east (East Broadway) | Western terminus of US 70B |
| Pike | Glenwood | | | AR 8S west (Harmon Circle) | Eastern terminus of AR 8S |
| Montgomery | | | | AR 240 west – Hopper | Eastern terminus of AR 240 |
| Montgomery | Norman | 0.00 | 0.00 | AR 8 west – Black Springs, Mena | Northern end of AR 8 concurrency |
| Montgomery | Mount Ida | 8.46 | 13.62 | US 270 – Hot Springs, "Y" City, Pencil Bluff | Northern terminus |
| Montgomery | Gap in route | | | | |
| Montgomery | | 0.00 | 0.00 | US 270 / AR 379 west – Hot Springs, "Y" City | Southern terminus; eastern terminus of AR 379 |
| Montgomery | | 4.78 | 7.69 | AR 188 east | Western terminus of AR 188 |
| Montgomery | Washita | 10.08 | 16.22 | AR 88 west – Pencil Bluff | Eastern terminus of AR 88 |
| Montgomery | Story | 13.15 | 21.16 | AR 298 east to AR 7 | Western terminus of AR 298 |
| Yell | Onyx | 27.62 | 44.45 | AR 314 east – Hollis | Western terminus of AR 314 |
| Yell | Rover | 36.23 | 58.31 | AR 28 west – Briggsville | Eastern terminus of AR 28 |
| Yell | | 38.18 | 61.44 | AR 28 east – Plainview, Dardanelle | Western terminus of AR 28 |
| Yell | Danville | 45.08 | 72.55 | AR 80 west – Waltreak | Eastern terminus of AR 80 |
| Yell | Danville | 46.09 | 74.17 | AR 10 – Booneville, Ola | Northern terminus |
| Yell | Danville | Gap in route | | | |
| Yell | Danville | 0.00 | 0.00 | AR 10 – Booneville, Ola | Southern terminus |
| Yell | | 3.25 | 5.23 | AR 154 east – Mount George, Centerville | Western terminus of AR 154 |
| Yell | | 9.20 | 14.81 | AR 307 south – Spring Lake | Northern terminus of AR 307 |
| Yell | Dardanelle | 18.41 | 29.63 | AR 7 / AR 22 west – Paris, Ola | Northern terminus; eastern terminus of AR 22 |
Gap in route
| Pope | Dover | 0.00 | 0.00 | AR 7 – Harrison, Russellville | Southern terminus |
| Pope | Scottsville | 6.12 | 9.85 | AR 164 east | Western terminus of AR 164 |
| Pope | | 10.24 | 16.48 | AR 105 south – Atkins | Northern terminus of AR 105 |
| Pope | | 31.35 | 50.45 | AR 16 east – Clinton | Southern end of AR 16 concurrency |
| Pope | | 0.00 | 0.00 | AR 16 west – Witts Spring | Northern end of AR 16 concurrency |
| Van Buren | Una | 4.79 | 7.71 | AR 254 east – Chimes | Western terminus of AR 254 |
| Searcy | Canaan | 22.60 | 36.37 | AR 333 south | Northern terminus of AR 333 |
| Searcy | | 24.94 | 40.14 | AR 333 north | Southern terminus of AR 333 |
| Searcy | Marshall | 29.97 | 48.23 | US 65 north – Harrison | Southern end of US 65 concurrency |
| Searcy | Marshall | 0.00 | 0.00 | US 65 south – Little Rock | Northern end of US 65 concurrency |
| Searcy | Marshall | 1.00 | 1.61 | AR 74 east – Landis, Mountain View | Western terminus of AR 74 |
| Searcy | Harriet | 10.66 | 17.16 | AR 14 – Yellville, Big Flat, Ozark Folk Center State Park, Blanchard Springs Caverns | Northern terminus |
1.000 mi = 1.609 km; 1.000 km = 0.621 mi: Concurrency terminus

== Special routes ==
Highway 27B
- Location: Nashville
- Length: 2.38 mi (3.83 km)

=== Nashville business route ===
Arkansas Highway 27 Business is a business route in Nashville. It is 2.38 miles (3.83 km) in length.

=== Former route ===
Highway 27N
- Location: Ben Lomond
- Existed: 1990s

Arkansas Highway 27N (AR 27N) was a short state highway in southwest Arkansas. It ran from US 71 south of Falls Chapel east to Highway 27 east of Ben Lomond. In the 1990s, Highway 27N was replaced by a realigned Highway 27.
