= Arkansas Highway 26 =

Highway in Arkansas

Highway 26
- AR 26 in red, AR 26S in blue

Route information
- Maintained by ArDOT

Section 1
- Length: 58.0 mi (93.3 km)
- West end: US 371 near Lockesburg
- Major intersections: US 278 in Center Point
- East end: AR 51 near Arkadelphia

Section 2
- Length: 2.8 mi (4.5 km)
- West end: I-30 near Gum Springs
- Major intersections: US 67 in Gum Springs
- East end: Alcoa plant entrance near Gum Springs

Location
- Country: United States
- State: Arkansas
- Counties: Howard, Pike, Clark

Highway system
- Arkansas Highway System; Interstate; US; State; Business; Spurs; Suffixed; Scenic; Heritage
← AR 25	→ AR 27

Arkansas Highway 26 (AR 26) is a designation for two state highways in Arkansas, United States. One segment of 58.0 miles (93.3 km) runs from U.S. Route 371 (US 371) east of Lockesburg east to Highway 51 west of Arkadelphia. A second segment of 2.8 miles (4.5 km) runs from Interstate 30 (I-30) west of Gum Springs east to the Alcoa plant east of Gum Springs. Highway 26 also has a spur route (designated as Highway 26S), which travels mainly along the corridor of the Clark County Industrial Park south of Gum Springs.

== Route description ==
=== Lockesburg to Arkadelphia ===
Highway 26 begins in rural Howard County, about 7 miles (11 km) east of the city of Lockesburg. The route heads east for just under eight miles (13 km) until it intersects US 278 in the small town of Center Point, which shares a very short concurrency before continuing to head east. For about 12.4 miles (20.0 km), the route continues to head east before intersecting with Highway 27 southwest of Murfreesboro. Both Highway 26 and Highway 27 share a concurrency, including through the city of Murfreesboro before both routes split apart just northeast of the city, about five miles (8.0 km) later. From there, the route continues to head east, traveling through the towns of Delight and Antoine. The entire route through Clark County is very rural, intersecting at Highway 53 in the town of Hollywood, before eventually ending at Highway 51 about five miles (8.0 km) southwest of Arkadelphia.

=== Gum Springs ===
The route begins at I-30 west of Gum Springs, and heads southeast for about 1.8 miles (2.9 km) before intersecting US 67 in Gum Springs. The route continues heading west for about one more mile (1.6 km) before ending at the entrance to the Alcoa plant east of Gum Springs.

== Major intersections ==
County	Location	mi	km	Destinations	Notes
Howard		0.0	0.0	US 371 – Lockesburg, De Queen	Western terminus; former AR 24
Howard	Center Point	7.8	12.6	US 278 west – Dierks	Western end of US 278 concurrency
Howard	Center Point	7.9	12.7	US 278 east – Nashville	Eastern end of US 278 concurrency
Howard		12.5	20.1	AR 369 north – Muddy Fork, Newhope	Southern terminus of AR 369
Pike		20.4	32.8	AR 27 south – Nashville, Mineral Springs	Western end of AR 27 concurrency
Pike	Murfreesboro	24.2	38.9	AR 301 south – Crater of Diamonds State Park	Northern terminus of AR 301
Pike	Murfreesboro	24.8	39.9	AR 19 north – Narrows Dam	Western end of AR 19 concurrency
Pike	Murfreesboro	25.3	40.7	AR 27 north – Glenwood, Mt. Ida, Hot Springs	Eastern end of AR 27 concurrency
Pike		28.5	45.9	AR 379 north	Southern terminus of AR 379
Pike	Delight	36.6	58.9	AR 195 south – McCaskill, Blevins	Northern terminus of AR 195
Pike	Delight	36.9	59.4	AR 19 south – Prescott	Eastern end of AR 19 concurrency
Pike	Antoine	41.6	66.9	AR 29 south / AR 301 south – Prescott, Blevins	Northern termini of AR 29 and AR 301
Clark	Hollywood	53.1	85.5	AR 53 – Gurdon, Amity	
Clark		58.0	93.3	AR 51 – Arkadelphia, Okolona	Eastern terminus
Clark	Gap in route				
Clark		0.0	0.0	I-30 – Little Rock, Texarkana	Western terminus; exit 69 on I-30
Clark	Gum Springs	1.8	2.9	US 67 – Arkadelphia, Gurdon	
Clark		2.2	3.5	AR 26S south – Clark County Industrial Park	Northern terminus of AR 26S
Clark		2.8	4.5	Alcoa plant entrance	Eastern terminus
1.000 mi = 1.609 km; 1.000 km = 0.621 mi

== Spur route ==
Highway 26S
- Location: Clark County
- Length: 1.2 mi (1.9 km)

Arkansas Highway 26 Spur is a spur route, which is about 1.2 miles (1.9 km) long and mainly runs along the corridor of the Clark County Industrial Park south of Gum Springs in Clark County. The route runs south to north, where its southern terminus is located at US 67 and its northern terminus is at Highway 26. The route is entirely located in the town of Gum Springs.
