= Arkansas Highway 195 =

State highway designation in Arkansas, United States

Highway 195

Route information
- Maintained by ArDOT

Section 1
- Length: 13.91 mi (22.39 km)
- South end: AR 355 in Fulton
- North end: US 278 in Washington

Section 2
- Length: 6.81 mi (10.96 km)
- South end: AR 332 in De Ann
- North end: US 371 near Blevins

Section 3
- Length: 12.30 mi (19.79 km)
- South end: US 371 near McCaskill
- North end: AR 19 / AR 26 in Delight

Location
- Country: United States
- State: Arkansas
- Counties: Hempstead, Pike

Highway system
- Arkansas Highway System; Interstate; US; State; Business; Spurs; Suffixed; Scenic; Heritage
← AR 193	→ AR 196

Arkansas Highway 195 (AR 195, Ark. 195, and Hwy. 195) is the designation for a state highway in the U.S. state of Arkansas. The route is split into three sections, all of which are located in southwest Arkansas. The first section begins at AR 355 in Fulton, and ends at US 278 in Washington. The second section begins at AR 332 in De Ann, and ends at US 371 just east of Blevins. The third section begins at US 371 just east of McCaskill, and ends at AR 19/AR 26 in Delight. All three routes are maintained by the Arkansas Department of Transportation (ARDOT).

== Route description ==
=== Section 1 ===
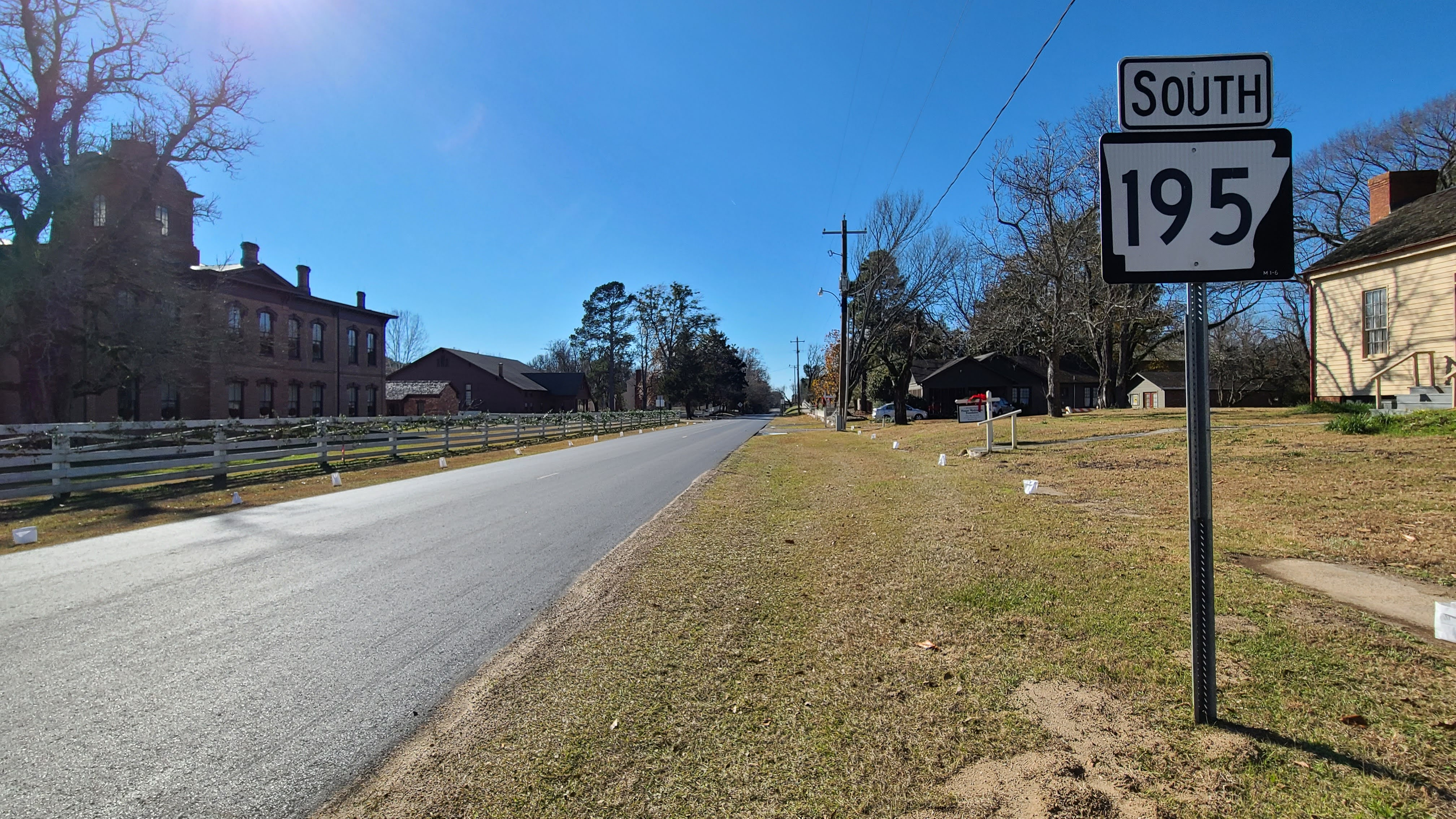
Northern terminus of Highway 195 in Washington, Arkansas

The first section of AR 195 begins at AR 355 in Fulton. The route runs towards the northeast for about 9.5 miles (15.3 km) before intersecting AR 73 in Cross Roads. The route continues northwest for about 4.4 miles (7.1 km) before reaching its northern terminus at US 278 in Washington.

=== Section 2 ===
The second section of AR 195 begins at AR 332 in De Ann. The route heads almost directly north for about 6.8 miles (10.9 km) before reaching its northern terminus at US 371 just east of Blevins. The route does not intersect any other communities or highways throughout its entire length.

=== Section 3 ===
The third section of AR 195 begins at US 371 just east of McCaskill. The route heads mainly towards the east, before turning towards the north shortly before crossing the Little Missouri River. Shortly after, the route intersects AR 301 just south of Pisgah, which provides direct access to the Crater of Diamonds State Park. The route continues for just under 5 miles (8.0 km) before intersecting AR 19/AR 26 in Delight.

== Major intersections ==
County	Location	mi	km	Destinations	Notes
Hempstead	Fulton	0.00	0.00	AR 355 to US 67 – Fulton, Millwood Dam	Southern terminus
Hempstead	Cross Roads	9.50	15.29	AR 73 – Hope, Saratoga	
Hempstead	Washington	13.91	22.39	US 278 – Hope, Nashville	Northern terminus
Hempstead	Gap in route				
Hempstead	De Ann	0.00	0.00	AR 332 – De Ann, Prescott	Southern terminus
Hempstead	Blevins	6.81	10.96	US 371 – Prescott, Blevins	Northern terminus; former AR 24
Hempstead	Gap in route				
Hempstead	McCaskill	0.00	0.00	US 371 – Blevins, McCaskill	Southern terminus; former AR 24
Pike	Pisgah	7.50	12.07	AR 301 – Billstown, Crater of Diamonds State Park	
Pike	Delight	12.30	19.79	AR 19 / AR 26 – Antoine, Murfreesboro	Northern terminus
1.000 mi = 1.609 km; 1.000 km = 0.621 mi
