= U.S. Route 278 in Arkansas =

Section of U.S. Highway in Arkansas

U.S. Highway 278
- US 278 highlighted in red

Route information
- Auxiliary route of US 78
- Maintained by ArDOT
- Length: 258.8 mi (416.5 km)
- Existed: 1998–present

Major junctions
- West end: US 59 / US 71 / Oak Street in Wickes
- US 70 near Dierks; US 371 near Nashville; I-30 in Hope; US 371 in Rosston; US 79 / US 79B in Camden; US 167 in Hampton; US 63 in Warren; US 425 in Monticello; US 65 / US 165 / AR 4 in McGehee; US 82 / AR 144 in Lake Village
- East end: US 82 / US 278 at Mississippi state line near Shives

Location
- Country: United States
- State: Arkansas
- Counties: Polk, Hempstead, Nevada, Ouachita, Calhoun, Bradley, Drew, Desha, Chicot

Highway system
- United States Numbered Highway System; List; Special; Divided; Arkansas Highway System; Interstate; US; State; Business; Spurs; Suffixed; Scenic; Heritage
← AR 277	→ AR 279

U.S. Highway 278 (US 278) runs west-east across the southern half of Arkansas for 258.8 miles (416.5 km). US 278 originates at a junction with U.S. Routes 59 and 71 in the town of Wickes and exits into Mississippi on the Greenville Bridge over the Mississippi River northeast of Shives, running concurrently with US 82.

For the vast majority of its route, US 278 is two-lane and rural, with the exception of portions in and around major towns and cities. The route connects small towns throughout southern Arkansas, with Hope and Camden being the largest population center along the route. As a result of its rural routing, US 278 has just one junction with an interstate highway, being I-30 at Hope. US 278 is planned to cross I-69 and even have a concurrency with it in the future.

== History ==
While US 278 was initially designated in 1951, it was not routed through the state of Arkansas until 1998. Up until that time, it ran to either Tupelo or a place near Amory. In 1998, it was routed to its current western terminus in Wickes, replacing a vast majority of Arkansas Highway 4, which remains a distinct albeit short highway in southeastern Desha County.

== Future ==
US 278 is planned to be rerouted onto the proposed Charles W. Dean Bridge. It is part of the plans to build Interstate 69 in Arkansas and in Mississippi.

== Major intersections ==
County	Location	mi	km	Destinations	Notes
Polk	Wickes	0.0	0.0	US 59 / US 71 / Oak Street – Mena, De Queen	Western terminus; continues as Oak Street beyond US 59/71
Polk	Wickes			I-49 – Fort Smith, Texarkana	Proposed
Howard	Umpire	17.6	28.3	AR 84 east – Athens	Western terminus of AR 84
Howard		28.9	46.5	US 70 east – Newhope, Kirby	West end of US 70 overlap; New Hope signed eastbound, Kirby westbound
Howard	Dierks	32.0	51.5	US 70 west (Main Avenue) / West Fourth Street – De Queen	East end of US 70 overlap; De Queen signed westbound only
Howard	Center Point	41.7	67.1	AR 26 west to US 371 / Texas Street – Lockesburg	West end of AR 26 overlap; Lockesburg signed eastbound, US 371 westbound
Howard	Center Point	41.8	67.3	AR 26 east – Murfreesboro, Highland	East end of AR 26 overlap; Murfreesboro signed eastbound, Highland westbound
Howard		43.9– 44.0	70.7– 70.8	AR 355 south – Mineral Springs	Northern terminus of AR 355
Howard		49.1	79.0	US 371 north / Honeycutt Road – Lockesburg	West end of US 371 overlap; former AR 24 north
Howard	Nashville	51.0	82.1	AR 980 north (North Main Street) / North Main Street – Business District	Southern terminus of AR 980; Business District signed eastbound only
Howard	Nashville	51.3	82.6	US 371 south (Peachtree Street) / AR 27 north (Mine Street) – Prescott, Murfreesboro	East end of US 371 overlap; west end of AR 27 overlap; former AR 24 south; Prescott signed eastbound only
Howard	Nashville	52.7	84.8	AR 27 south – Mineral Springs	East end of AR 27 overlap; Mineral Springs signed eastbound only
Howard	Nashville	52.8	85.0	AR 27B north (East Russell Street) – Business District	Southern terminus of AR 27B; Business District signed westbound only
Hempstead		58.4	94.0	AR 332 west – Tollette, Rick Evans Grandview Prairie Conservation Education Center	Eastern terminus of AR 332; Tollette signed eastbound only
Hempstead	Washington	69.6	112.0	AR 195 south / Franklin Street – Cross Roads	Northern terminus of AR 195; Cross Roads signed eastbound only
Hempstead		74.0	119.1	AR 32 east / Airport Road – Oakhaven	Western terminus of AR 32
Hempstead		76.1	122.5	AR 73 north – Saratoga, Millwood Dam	West end of AR 73 overlap
Hempstead	Hope	77.7– 78.0	125.0– 125.5	I-30 – Texarkana, Little Rock	I-30 exit 30
Hempstead	Hope	78.2	125.9	US 278B east (North Hervey Street) / West Commerce Boulevard	Western terminus of US 278B
Hempstead	Hope	79.0	127.1	AR 29 north / AR 29B south (North Hazel Street) to I-30 – Blevins	West end of AR 29 overlap; northern terminus of AR 29B; To I-30 signed westbound only
Hempstead	Hope	81.4	131.0	US 67 (East Third Street) / US 278B west	Eastern terminus of US 278B
Hempstead	Hope	82.1	132.1	AR 29 south (Bill Clinton Drive) / Henry C. Yerger Street – University of Arkansas Community College at Hope	East end of AR 29 overlap; college and hospital signed westbound only
Hempstead		83.3	134.1	AR 32 east – Bodcaw	Western terminus of AR 32
Nevada		95.1	153.0	AR 53 – Bodcaw, Prescott	
Nevada	Rosston	100.5	161.7	US 371 north (Rosston Highway) – Prescott	West end of US 371 overlap; Prescott signed eastbound only
Nevada	Rosston	101.0	162.5	AR 200 east – Cale	Western terminus of AR 200
Nevada	Rosston	101.4	163.2	US 371 south – Magnolia	East end of US 371 overlap
Nevada		108.9	175.3	AR 76 west – Waterloo	Eastern terminus of AR 76
Ouachita		114.4	184.1	AR 57 – Stephens, Chidester, Poison Spring W.M.A.	
Ouachita		124.4	200.2	AR 376 east to US 79	Western terminus of AR 376
Ouachita		127.3	204.9	AR 24 west (Chidester Road) – Prescott	Eastern terminus of AR 24
Ouachita	Camden	128.0	206.0	US 278B east (West Washington Street)	Western terminus of US 278B
Ouachita	Camden	129.9– 130.0	209.1– 209.2	US 79 south / US 79B north – Magnolia	West end of US 79 overlap; interchange; southern terminus of US 79B
Ouachita	Camden	130.7– 130.8	210.3– 210.5	AR 7 – El Dorado, Arkansas Museum of Natural Resources	Interchange
Ouachita		132.2– 132.6	212.8– 213.4	Ouachita River	
Ouachita		135.0– 135.5	217.3– 218.1	US 79 north / US 79B south – Little Rock, Fairgrounds	East end of US 79 overlap; northern terminus of US 79B; partial interchange; airport signed westbound only
Ouachita	East Camden	136.0	218.9	AR 274 east – East Camden, SAU Tech, Arkansas Fire Training Academy, Arkansas Law Enforcement Training Academy	Western terminus of AR 274; East Camden, training academies signed eastbound only
Calhoun	Hampton	154.4	248.5	AR 203 north	Southern terminus of AR 203
Calhoun	Hampton	154.6	248.8	US 167 (Lee Street) – El Dorado, Fordyce	Destinations signed westbound only
Calhoun	Hampton	155.4	250.1	AR 274 north – Tinsman	Southern terminus of AR 274
Calhoun	Harrell	159.3	256.4	AR 160 east (Southeast Central) – Jersey	Western terminus of AR 160
Bradley	Banks	168.6	271.3	AR 275 north / CR 12 – Tinsman	Southern terminus of AR 275
Bradley		178.6	287.4	US 278B east – Warren	Western terminus of US 278B; hospital signed eastbound only
Bradley	Warren	180.8	291.0	US 63 / AR 8 – El Dorado, Warren	AR 8 signed westbound only
Bradley	Warren	183.4	295.2	US 278B west (East Church Street) / Lura Lea Lane – Warren	Eastern terminus of US 278B
Bradley		184.5	296.9	AR 189 north – Pine Bluff, Fordyce	Southern terminus of AR 189; Fordyce signed westbound only
Bradley		185.4– 185.8	298.4– 299.0	S.M. Dixon Bridge over Saline River	
Bradley		186.9	300.8	AR 172 east – New Hope	Western terminus of AR 172
Drew		193.1	310.8	AR 530 north to AR 35 – Rye	Current southern terminus of AR 530; future I-530
Drew	Monticello	198.1	318.8	US 425 (AR 35 north) – Hamburg, Pine Bluff, University of Arkansas at Monticello	West end of AR 35 overlap; University signed eastbound only
Drew	Monticello	198.5	319.5	Hyatt Street	Begin one-way segment
Drew	Monticello	198.8	319.9	AR 83 (Main Street)	
Drew	Monticello	199.3	320.7	US 278 west (East McCloy Street) / East Gaines Avenue	End one-way segment
Drew	Monticello	199.8	321.5	AR 138 east (Winchester Road) – Winchester	Western terminus of AR 138
Drew	Monticello	200.7	323.0	AR 35 south – Dermott	East end of AR 35 overlap
Drew	Monticello	200.8	323.2	AR 980	To Monticello Municipal Airport
Drew		204.7	329.4	US 278 Byp. west	Eastern terminus of US 278 Byp.; future I-69
Drew		212.6	342.1	AR 293 north / Selma-Collins Road – Selma	Southern terminus of AR 293
Drew		213.7	343.9	AR 277 north – Tillar	Southern terminus of AR 277
Desha	McGehee	223.2	359.2	AR 159 north (Chicksaw Road)	Southern terminus of AR 159
Desha	McGehee	224.2	360.8	AR 159 south (Masonville Road) – Masonville	Northern terminus of AR 159
Desha	McGehee	225.0	362.1	AR 1 north (North First Street) to US 65 – Pine Bluff	Southern terminus of AR 1
Desha	McGehee	226.6	364.7	US 65 north / US 165 north / AR 4 east – Pine Bluff, Arkansas City	West end of US 65 / 165 overlap; western terminus of AR 4
Desha		228.3	367.4	AR 159 north – Masonville	Southern terminus of AR 159
Chicot	Dermott	230.8	371.4	US 165 south – Dermott, Montrose	East end of US 165 overlap
Chicot	Halley Junction	232.1	373.5	AR 35 – Halley, Y.B. Port	Destinations signed westbound only
Chicot	Bellaire	234.1	376.7	AR 208 west / Black Pond Road	Eastern terminus of AR 208
Chicot	McMillan Corner	242.9	390.9	AR 144 west / AR 257 south – Lake Chicot State Park	Eastern terminus of AR 144; northern terminus of AR 257; state park signed eastbound only
Chicot		246.5	396.7	AR 980 west (Airport Road)	Eastern terminus of AR 980
Chicot	Lake Village	247.0	397.5	US 82 west / AR 144 east (St. Mary's Street) – Montrose, Hamburg	West end of US 82 overlap; western terminus of AR 144
Chicot	Chanticleer	249.4	401.4	AR 159 south – Jennie	West end of AR 159 overlap
Chicot	Chanticleer	249.5	401.5	AR 159 north (South Lakeshore Drive) – Lake Village Business District	East end of AR 159 overlap; business district signed westbound only
Chicot		251.7	405.1	US 65 south – Eudora	East end of US 65 overlap
Chicot	Shives	256.2	412.3	AR 142 south / Old US 82 – Lakeport, Lakehall, Lakeport Plantation Home	Northern terminus of AR 142
Mississippi River		256.6– 259.2	413.0– 417.1	Greenville Bridge; Arkansas–Mississippi state line	
Mississippi River		256.6– 259.2	413.0– 417.1	US 82 east / US 278 east – Greenville	Continuation into Mississippi
1.000 mi = 1.609 km; 1.000 km = 0.621 mi: Concurrency terminus

== See also ==
- U.S. Route 78 in Arkansas

U.S. Route 278
Previous state: Terminus	Arkansas	Next state: Mississippi
