= Arkansas Highway 29 =

State highway in Arkansas, United States

Highway 29

Route information
- Maintained by ArDOT

Section 1
- Length: 67.6 mi (108.8 km)
- South end: LA 3 at the Louisiana state line near Bradley
- Major intersections: US 82 in Lewisville; US 67 / US 278B in Hope; US 278 / AR 29B in Hope; I-30 in Hope; US 371 in Blevins
- North end: AR 19 near Prescott

Section 2
- Length: 4.3 mi (6.9 km)
- South end: AR 19 near Antoine
- North end: AR 26 / AR 301 in Antoine

Location
- Country: United States
- State: Arkansas
- Counties: Lafayette, Hempstead, Nevada, Pike

Highway system
- Arkansas Highway System; Interstate; US; State; Business; Spurs; Suffixed; Scenic; Heritage
← AR 28	→ I-30

Arkansas Highway 29 (AR 29) is a designation for two state highways in South Arkansas. One segment of 67.6 miles (108.8 km) runs from the Louisiana state line north to Highway 19 north of Prescott. A second segment of 4.3 miles (6.9 km) runs from Highway 19 south of Antoine north to Highway 26 in Antoine.

== Route description ==
=== Louisiana to Prescott ===
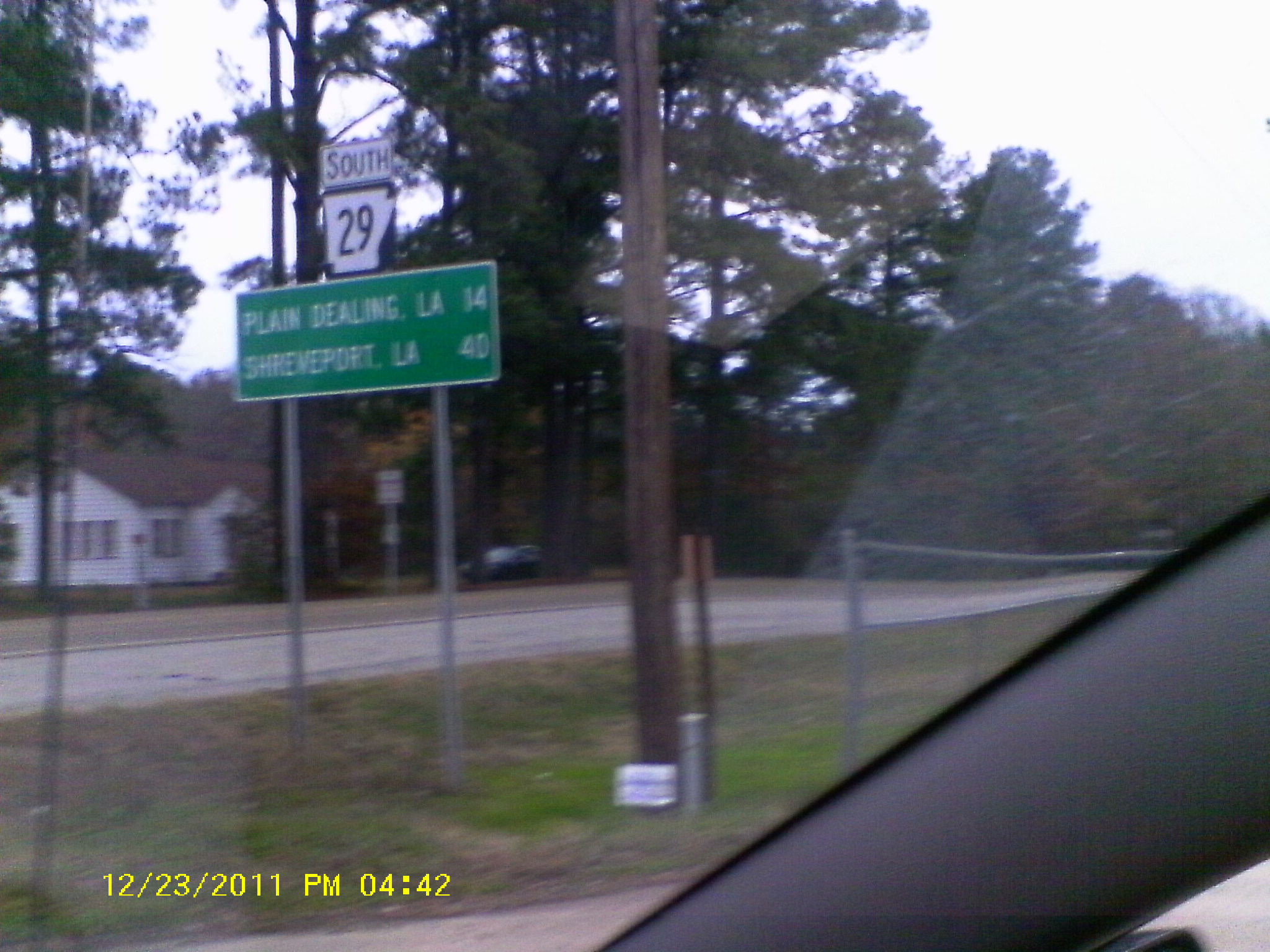
Highway 29 signage in Bradley

Highway 29 begins at the Louisiana state line as a continuation of Louisiana Highway 3 and runs north parallel to the Union Pacific tracks, intersecting Highway 160 in Bradley and U.S. Route 82 (US 82) in Lewisville. The route runs for 33.8 miles (54.4 km) in Lafayette County before continuing north into Hempstead County. The route has multiple important junctions in Hope. The route meets US 67, US 278, US 371, and Interstate 30 (I-30) in Hope. Highway 29 concurs with US 278 and runs around Hope as Bill Clinton Drive. The route runs for 41.3 miles (66.5 km) in Hempstead County. Shortly after entering Nevada County, Highway 29 terminates at Highway 19 north of Prescott.

=== Pike County ===
The route begins at Highway 19 south of Antoine in Pike County and runs north. Highway 29 meets Highway 301 in Antoine, just south of its northern terminus of Highway 26.

== Major intersections ==
County	Location	mi	km	Destinations	Notes
Lafayette		0.0	0.0	LA 3 south – Plain Dealing, Shreveport	Continuation into Louisiana
Lafayette	Bradley	5.6	9.0	AR 160 – Gin City, Business District, Taylor, Conway Cemetery Historic State Park	
Lafayette	Canfield	11.7	18.8	AR 360 west	Southern end of AR 360 concurrency
Lafayette		11.9	19.2	AR 360 east to AR 53	Northern end of AR 360 concurrency
Lafayette	Lewisville	23.9	38.5	AR 313 south to AR 53	Northern terminus of AR 313
Lafayette	Lewisville	24.5	39.4	US 82 (1st Street) – Texarkana, Magnolia	
Hempstead	Center Point	36.0	57.9	AR 355 south – Patmos	Northern terminus of AR 355
Hempstead	Evening Shade	40.8	65.7	AR 355 west – Springhill, Dr. Lester Sitzes III Bois D'Arc WMA	Eastern terminus of AR 355
Hempstead	Hope	46.4	74.7	AR 29B north (South Main Street) – Patmos	Southern terminus of AR 29B
Hempstead	Hope	47.9	77.1	US 278 east (Shover Road) – Rosston, Camden	Southern end of US 278 concurrency
Hempstead	Hope	48.6	78.2	US 67 / US 278B west	Eastern terminus of US 278B
Hempstead	Hope	51.0	82.1	US 278 west / AR 29B south – Nashville	Northern end of US 278 concurrency
Hempstead	Hope	51.3	82.6	I-30 – Texarkana, Little Rock	Exit 31 on I-30
Hempstead		52.4	84.3	AR 32 west to US 278 – Oakhaven, Airport	Eastern terminus of AR 32
Hempstead		57.9	93.2	AR 332 east – Deann	Western terminus of AR 332
Hempstead	Blevins	66.8	107.5	US 371 – Nashville, Prescott	Former AR 24
Nevada		67.6	108.8	AR 19 – Prescott, Delight	Northern terminus
Gap in route
Pike		0.0	0.0	AR 19 – Prescott, Delight	Southern terminus
Pike		1.3	2.1	AR 301 south – Pisgah	Northern terminus of AR 301
Pike		1.7	2.7	AR 301 north	Southern terminus of AR 301
Pike	Antoine	4.2	6.8	AR 301 south	Northern terminus of AR 301
Pike	Antoine	4.3	6.9	AR 26 – Murfreesboro, Arkadelphia	Northern terminus
1.000 mi = 1.609 km; 1.000 km = 0.621 mi: Concurrency terminus

== Hope business route ==
Highway 29B
- Location: Hope
- Length: 3.0 mi (4.8 km)

Arkansas Highway 29 Business is a 3.0-mile-long (4.8 km) business route in Hope. It passes the Missouri Pacific Railroad Depot-Hope and the Ethridge House, both on the National Register of Historic Places. The route was designated after 1962.

== See also ==
- List of state highways in Arkansas
