= U.S. Route 371 =

Highway in the United States

U.S. Route 371
- US 371 highlighted in red

Route information
- Auxiliary route of US 71
- Maintained by LaDOTD and AHTD
- Length: 214 mi (344 km)
- Existed: 1994–present

Major junctions
- South end: I-49 / LA 177 at Evelyn, LA
- US 71 / US 84 in Coushatta, LA; I-20 in Minden, LA; US 79 / US 80 in Dixie Inn, LA; US 82 in Magnolia, AR; US 278 in Rosston, AR; US 67 in Prescott, AR; I-30 in Prescott, AR; US 278 in Nashville, AR
- North end: US 59 / US 70 / US 71 / AR 41 at DeQueen, AR

Location
- Country: United States
- States: Louisiana, Arkansas

Highway system
- United States Numbered Highway System; List; Special; Divided
- Louisiana State Highway System; Interstate; US; State; Scenic
- Arkansas Highway System; Interstate; US; State; Business; Spurs; Suffixed; Scenic; Heritage
← LA 370	LA	→ LA 372
← AR 370	AR	→ AR 371
← LA 6	LA 7	→ LA 8
← LA 178	LA 179	→ LA 180

U.S. Route 371 is a north–south United States highway in the U.S. states of Arkansas and Louisiana. The highway's northern terminus is in De Queen, Arkansas at an intersection with U.S. Highway 70. It is co-signed for its last 13 miles (21 km) between Lockesburg, Arkansas and DeQueen with U.S. Highway 59 and U.S. Highway 71. Its southern terminus is 5 miles (8.0 km) west of Coushatta, Louisiana at an intersection with Interstate 49.

== Route description ==
=== Louisiana ===
U.S. 371 is an afterthought in the federal highway system. Within Louisiana it was merely the 1990s renumbering and re-signing of the post-1955 Louisiana Highway 7 north of US 71, which after the 1990s change ceased to exist as a number for a state highway in Louisiana. The section south of US 71 was the post-1955 Louisiana Highway 179, which after the 1990s change ceased to exist as a number for a state highway in Louisiana. It also replaced a section of Louisiana Highway 177. Although signage is on I-49, US 371 begins just north of Coushatta, Louisiana at an intersection with US 71. Intersecting I-20 and US 80 at Minden, it then crosses the Arkansas Line at Springhill, Louisiana. Louisiana Highway 371, on the other hand, was renumbered to Louisiana Highway 3277 because of the creation of US 371.

=== Arkansas ===
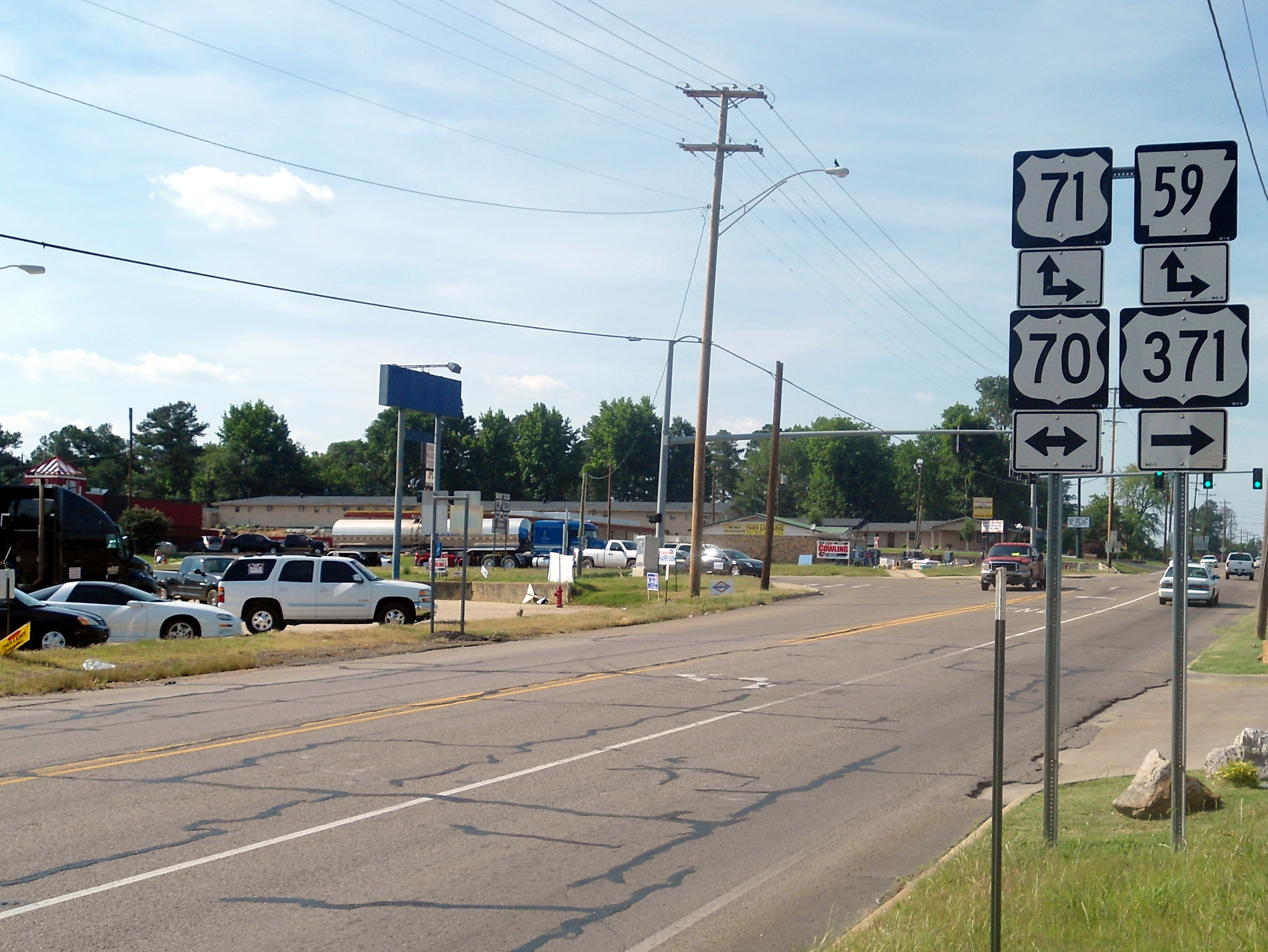
Northern terminus of US 371 at US 59/US 70/US 71/AR 41 in De Queen

US 371 contains about 134 miles (216 km) in South Arkansas.

US 371 enters Arkansas in Columbia County. The route runs north to intersect AR 160 in Taylor and winds east to Magnolia. A concurrency with US 82 begins in Magnolia, and continues north to the city limits. US 371 continues west to meet AR 98 in Waldo, before heading north to enter Nevada County. The route next meets AR 32 and AR 76 before entering Rosston, where a short concurrency with US 278 forms. US 371 meets AR 372 before entering Prescott, where the route meets AR 24 and is intersected by Interstate 30 before entering Hempstead County.

US 371 winds through Hempstead County west and north, concurring briefly with AR 195 and eventually entering Howard County. The route passes through Nashville, again meeting US 278, and runs west through rural land and into Sevier County. In Sevier County, US 371 meets US 59/US 71, which form a northern concurrency, eventually adding US 70 as well. These four routes run together west to De Queen, at which US 371 terminates.

== History ==
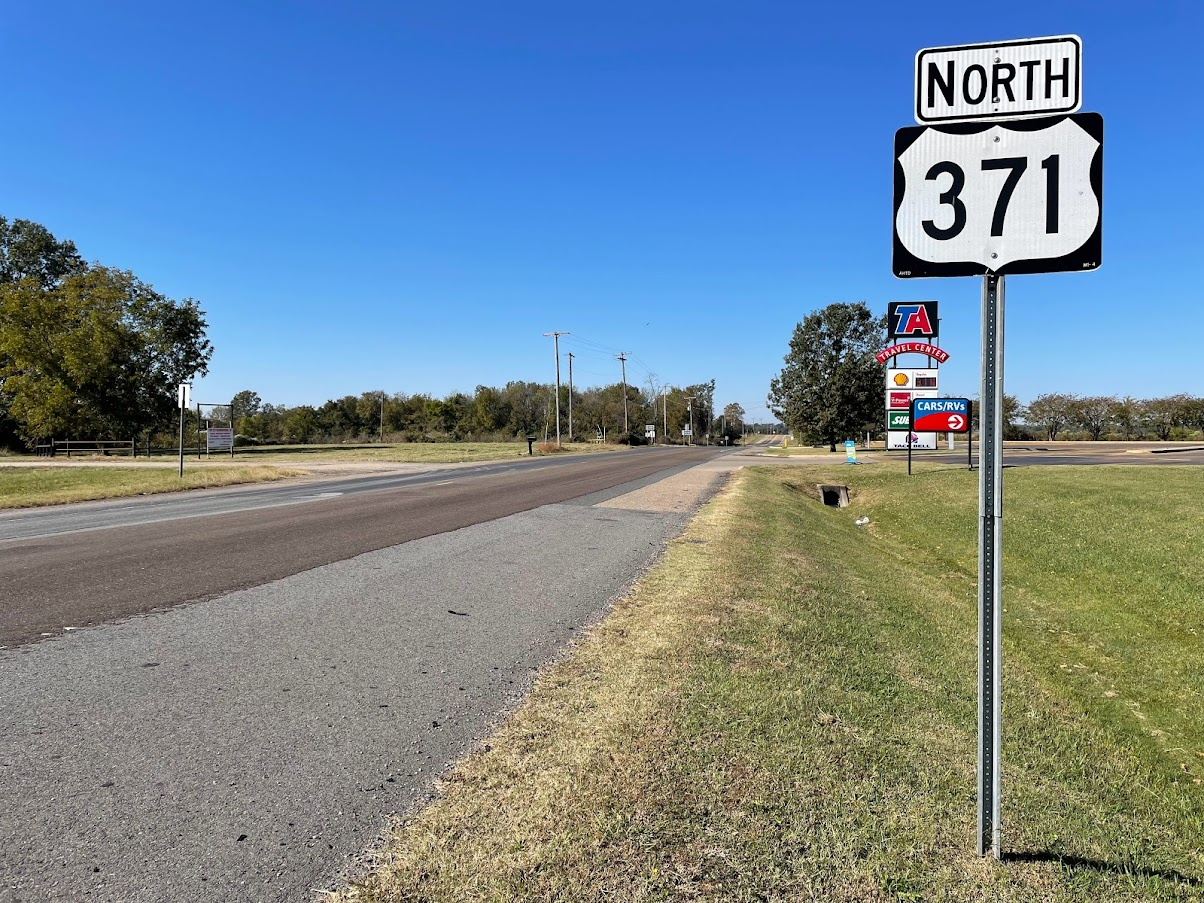
U.S. Route 371 in Prescott, Arkansas looking north

Initially referenced as the Bi-State Corridor, the Arkansas State Highway Commission designated several state highways as a proposed corridor to seek AASHTO approval as a US highway in January 1994. Upon receiving approval, the route was officially commissioned in Arkansas as Highway 371 on 24 August 1994.

=== Minnesota ===
A prior, unrelated US 371 was decommissioned in Minnesota in 1971. The route still bears the designation of MN 371.

== Major intersections ==
State	County/Parish	Location	mi	km	Destinations	Notes
Louisiana	DeSoto				I-49 / LA 177 south – Alexandria, Shreveport	I-49 exit 162; south end of LA 177 overlap
Louisiana	DeSoto	Evelyn			LA 510 west	
Louisiana	Red River				LA 177 north	north end of LA 177 overlap
Louisiana	Red River	Armistead			US 84 west / LA 1 – Mansfield, Shreveport, Natchitoches	south end of US 84 overlap
Louisiana	Red River	Coushatta			US 84 east to US 71 south – truck route to LA 480	north end of US 84 overlap
Louisiana	Red River	Coushatta			LA 480 south (Front Street)	
Louisiana	Red River	Coushatta			US 71 south to US 84 east – Alexandria, truck route to LA 480	south end of US 71 overlap
Louisiana	Red River	Coushatta			LA 155 east (Ashland Road) – Martin, Ashland	
Louisiana	Red River	Coushatta			US 71 north – Bossier City	north end of US 71 overlap
Louisiana	Red River				LA 786 east	
Louisiana	Red River				LA 788 west – Hall Summit	
Louisiana	Red River				LA 514 west	south end of LA 514 overlap
Louisiana	Red River				LA 514 east – Castor	north end of LA 514 overlap
Louisiana	Bienville	Woodardville			LA 783 south	
Louisiana	Bienville				LA 790 west	
Louisiana	Bienville	Ringgold			LA 4 east / LA 154 east (Bienville Road) – Jamestown, Castor	south end of LA 4 / LA 154 overlap
Louisiana	Bienville	Ringgold			LA 4 west / LA 154 west – Loggy Bayou	south end of LA 4 / LA 154 overlap
Louisiana	Bienville	Davis			LA 516 east – Fryeburg	
Louisiana	Webster				LA 531 north – Heflin	
Louisiana	Webster	Sibley			LA 164 west – Doyline, Lake Bistineau State Park	
Louisiana	Webster	Minden			I-20 east / LA 159 north – Minden, Monroe	south end of I-20 overlap; US 371 south follows exit 47
Louisiana	Webster				I-20 west – Shreveport	north end of I-20 overlap; US 371 north follows exit 44
Louisiana	Webster	Dixie Inn			US 79 / US 80 – Minden	
Louisiana	Webster				LA 528 west – Bellevue	
Louisiana	Webster	Cotton Valley			LA 3014 east (Humble Avenue)	
Louisiana	Webster	Cotton Valley			LA 160	
Louisiana	Webster	Sarepta			LA 2	
Louisiana	Webster	Sarepta			LA 2 Spur east – Shongaloo	
Louisiana	Webster	Porterville			LA 802 east (Porterville Road)	
Louisiana	Webster	Springhill			LA 803-1	
Louisiana	Webster	Springhill			LA 157 – Plain Dealing, Haynesville	
			84.14– 0.000	135.41– 0.000	Louisiana–Arkansas state line	
Arkansas	Columbia	Taylor	5.70	9.17	AR 160 west – Walker Creek	south end of AR 160 overlap
Arkansas	Columbia	Taylor	5.83	9.38	AR 160 east – Macedonia	north end of AR 160 overlap
Arkansas	Columbia		21.95	35.33	AR 344 west – Lake Columbia	
Arkansas	Columbia	Magnolia	25.16	40.49	US 82B east (Main Street)	
Arkansas	Columbia	Magnolia	27.23	43.82	US 82 to US 79 – Texarkana, El Dorado, Southern Arkansas University	
Arkansas	Columbia	Waldo	31.45	50.61	AR 98 east – Camden	south end of AR 98 overlap
Arkansas	Columbia	Waldo	32.57	52.42	AR 98 west – Texarkana	north end of AR 98 overlap
Arkansas	Columbia	Lamartine	35.58	57.26	AR 355 north – Falcon	
Arkansas	Nevada	Willisville	44.11	70.99	AR 32 west / CR 8 – Bodcaw	
Arkansas	Nevada	Irma	46.80	75.32	AR 76 east – Waterloo	
Arkansas	Nevada	Rosston	49.28	79.31	US 278 east to AR 57 – Camden	south end of US 278 overlap
Arkansas	Nevada	Rosston	49.70	79.98	AR 200 east – Cale	
Arkansas	Nevada	Rosston	50.16	80.72	US 278 west – Hope	north end of US 278 overlap
Arkansas	Nevada				AR 372 east – Serepta Springs	
Arkansas	Nevada	Laneburg			AR 372 west	
Arkansas	Nevada				AR 299 south – Bluff City	south end of AR 299 overlap
Arkansas	Nevada				AR 53 south / AR 299 north – Emmet	north end of AR 299 overlap
Arkansas	Nevada	Prescott			US 67 south – Hope	south end of US 67 overlap
Arkansas	Nevada	Prescott			US 67 north / AR 24 east – Bluff City	north end of US 67 overlap
Arkansas	Nevada	Prescott			AR 19 north (West Main Street) to I-30 east	
Arkansas	Nevada	Prescott			AR 200 east (Ron Harrod Drive)	
Arkansas	Nevada	Prescott			I-30 – Texarkana, Little Rock	I-30 exit 44
Arkansas	Hempstead				AR 195 south – De Ann	
Arkansas	Hempstead	Blevins			AR 29 to AR 19 – Hope	
Arkansas	Hempstead	Dotson			AR 195 north – Delight	
Arkansas	Howard	Nashville			US 278 east / AR 27 (Mine Street) – Hope, Murfreesboro	south end of US 278 overlap
Arkansas	Howard	Nashville			AR 980 north (Main Street) – Business District, Airport	
Arkansas	Howard	Nashville			US 278 west – Dierks	north end of US 278 overlap
Arkansas	Howard				AR 355 – Mineral Springs, Center Point	
Arkansas	Howard				AR 26 east – Center Point, Murfreesboro	
Arkansas	Sevier	Lockesburg			US 59 south / US 71 south / AR 24 west – Horatio, Ashdown, Texarkana	south end of US 59 / US 71 overlap
Arkansas	Sevier				US 70 east – Dierks, Lake Greeson, Hot Springs, Crater of Diamonds State Park, Daisy State Park	south end of US 70 overlap
Arkansas	Sevier	De Queen			US 59 north / US 70 west / US 71 north / US 70B west / AR 41 south – Hugo, OK, Foreman, Fort Smith	north end of US 59 / US 70 / US 71 overlap
1.000 mi = 1.609 km; 1.000 km = 0.621 mi: Concurrency terminus

== See also ==
Related routes:

- U.S. Route 71
- U.S. Route 171
- U.S. Route 271
- LA 7 in the pre-1955 Louisiana Highway numbering
