= Arkansas Highway 301 =

State highway in Arkansas, United States

Highway 301

Route information
- Maintained by ArDOT
- Length: 23.49 mi (37.80 km)
- Existed: April 24, 1963–present

Major junctions
- South end: AR 26 / AR 27 in Murfreesboro
- AR 195; AR 19 at Piney Grove; AR 29
- North end: AR 26 / AR 29 in Antoine

Location
- Country: United States
- State: Arkansas
- Counties: Pike

Highway system
- Arkansas Highway System; Interstate; US; State; Business; Spurs; Suffixed; Scenic; Heritage
← AR 300	→ AR 302

Highway 301 (AR 301, Ark. 301 and Hwy. 301) is a north–south state highway in Pike County, Arkansas. The route of 22.90 miles (36.85 km) runs from Highway 26/Highway 27 in Murfreesboro through rural Pike County to Highway 29 in Antoine.

== Route description ==
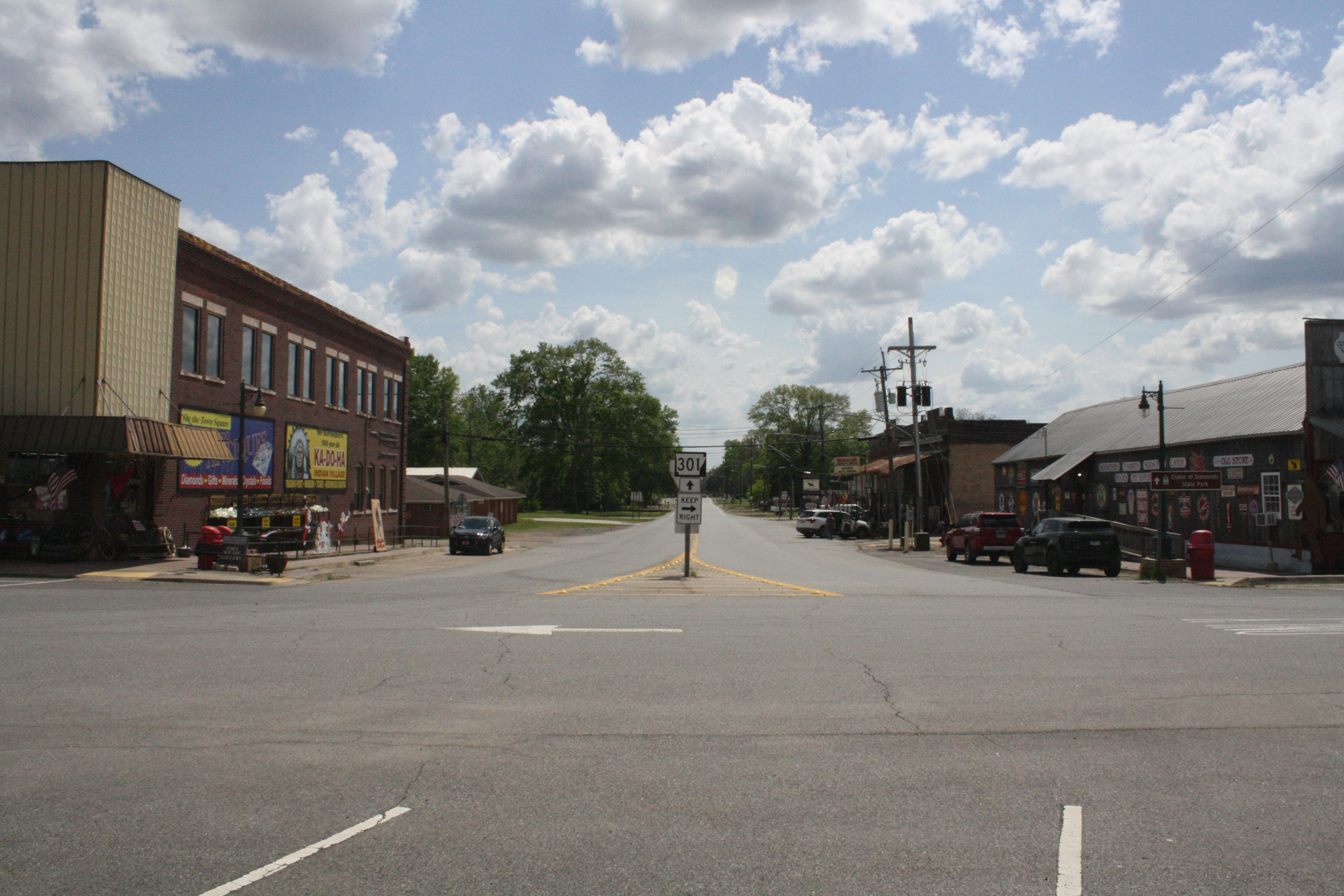
AR 301 turns right onto Washington Street in downtown Murfreesboro

Highway 301 begins at Highway 26/Highway 27 at the Pike County Courthouse square in Murfreesboro. The square also contains the Murfreesboro Cities Service Station and Conway Hotel, both on the National Register of Historic Places. The route runs south at Washington Avenue before exiting town to the south. Highway 301 serves as the northern edge of Crater of Diamonds State Park, the world's only active diamond mind open to the public. South of the park the highway becomes a rural route, passing east through forested lands. AR 301 has a junction with Highway 195 south of Pigsah and Highway 19 at Piney Grove.

Further east of this junction, the highway forms a concurrency with Highway 29. After breaking from the overlap, Highway 301 turns due east then due north to enter Antoine, where it terminates at Highway 29 just south of Highway 26.

== History ==
Highway 301 was added to the state highway system as part of a large transfer of county roads to the state system that took place on April 24, 1963. Initially only the portion from Murfreesboro to Billstown was transferred to state maintenance.

== Major intersections ==
Mile markers reset at concurrencies. The entire route is in Pike County.

Location	mi	km	Destinations	Notes
Murfreesboro	0.00	0.00	AR 26 / AR 27 – Kirby, Delight, Nashville	Southern terminus
	13.37	21.52	AR 195 – Delight	
Piney Grove	18.38	29.58	AR 19 – Murfreesboro, Prescott	
	19.53– 20.12	31.43– 32.38	AR 29 south – Prescott, Antoine	
Antoine	23.49	37.80	AR 26 / AR 29 south – Murfreesboro, Arkadelphia	Northern terminus
1.000 mi = 1.609 km; 1.000 km = 0.621 mi

== See also ==
- List of state highways in Arkansas
