= Brownstown, Arkansas =

Brownstown
- Town
- Location in Arkansas
- Coordinates: 33°49′05″N 94°04′01″W
- Country: United States
- State: Arkansas
- County: Sevier
- Elevation: 423 ft (129 m)
- Time zone: UTC-6 (Central (CST))
  - Summer (DST): UTC-5 (CDT)
- ZIP code: 71846

Brownstown is a town in Sevier County, Arkansas, United States, east of Ben Lomond.

== Geology ==
The Brownstown Marl underlies Brownstown, and is named after it.
