= First Presbyterian Church (Nashville, Arkansas) =

Historic church in Arkansas, United States

- U.S. National Register of Historic Places
- Location within Arkansas Location within the United States
- Location: 2nd and Hempstead Sts., Nashville, Arkansas
- Coordinates: 33°56′33.2766″N 93°50′55.2228″W
- Area: less than one acre
- Built: 1912
- Built by: Elijah Alexander Williams
- Architectural style: Stick/Eastlake, High Victorian Gothic
- NRHP reference No.: 76000418
- Added to NRHP: May 4, 1976

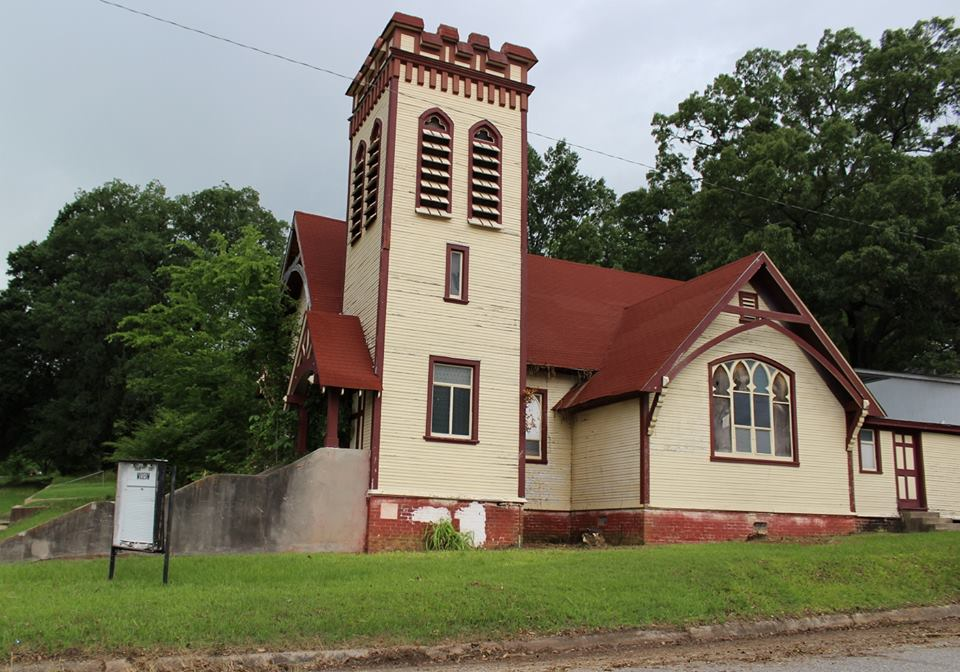
Restoration project Howard Co. Historical Society, 2014.jpg

The First Presbyterian Church is a historic Presbyterian church at 2nd and Hempstead Streets in Nashville, Arkansas. The building is now home to the E. A. Williams Chapel and Museum, and is owned and operated by the Howard County Historical Society. The building is a single-story wood-frame structure, constructed in 1912 by builder Elijah Alexander Williams. It is roughly L-shaped, and exhibits a combination of Queen Anne and Stick styling that is rare in southwestern Arkansas.

The building was listed on the National Register of Historic Places in 1976.

== See also ==
- National Register of Historic Places listings in Howard County, Arkansas
