= Arkansas Highway 200 =

State highway designation in Arkansas, United States

Highway 200
- Arkansas Highway 200 highlighted in red

Route information
- Maintained by ArDOT

Section 1
- Length: 9.591 mi (15.435 km)
- West end: US 278 / US 371 in Rosston
- East end: AR 299 in Morris

Section 2
- Length: 1.951 mi (3.140 km)
- West end: US 371 in Prescott
- East end: I-30 / AR 19 in Prescott

Location
- Country: United States
- State: Arkansas
- Counties: Nevada

Highway system
- Arkansas Highway System; Interstate; US; State; Business; Spurs; Suffixed; Scenic; Heritage
| ← AR 199 | → AR 201 |

Arkansas Highway 200 (AR 200, Ark. 200, and Hwy. 200) is the designation for a state highway in the U.S. state of Arkansas. The route is split into two sections, both of which are in southwest Arkansas. The first section begins at US 278 and US 371 in Rosston and ends at AR 299 at the unincorporated community of Morris. The second section begins at US 371 on the west end of Prescott and ends at AR 19 on the north end of Prescott. Both sections are located entirely within Nevada county and are maintained by the Arkansas Department of Transportation (ARDOT).

== Route description ==
=== Section 1 ===
The first and longest section begins at US 278 and US 371 in Rosston. The route heads east, then turns north and enters the small community of Cale, serving as the primary access road for the community. The route continues north for about 3.5 miles (5.6 km) before reaching its eastern terminus at AR 299 at the unincorporated community of Morris, or about 7 miles (11 km) southwest of Bluff City. The route is about 9.6 miles (15.4 km) long and does not intersect any other signed highways.

=== Section 2 ===
The second section begins at US 371 on the west end of Prescott. The route then heads in a northeastern direction for about 2 miles (3.2 km) before reaching its eastern terminus at AR 19 on the north end of Prescott. The route parallels Interstate 30 for its entire length and does not intersects any other signed highways or communities.

== Major intersections ==
The entire route is in Nevada County.

| Location | mi | km | Destinations | Notes |
|---|---|---|---|---|
| Rosston | 0.00 | 0.00 | US 278 / US 371 – Hope, Magnolia | Western terminus |
| Morris | 9.59 | 15.43 | AR 299 – Bluff City, Emmet | Eastern terminus |
Gap in route
| Prescott | 0.00 | 0.00 | US 371 to I-30 – Prescott | Western terminus; former AR 24 |
| Prescott | 1.95 | 3.14 | I-30 / AR 19 – Prescott | Eastern terminus; I-30 exit 46 |
1.000 mi = 1.609 km; 1.000 km = 0.621 mi
