= McCaskill, Arkansas =

- Town
- Location of McCaskill in Hempstead County, Arkansas.
- Coordinates: 33°55′07″N 93°38′30″W
- Country: United States
- State: Arkansas
- County: Hempstead

Area
  - Total: 0.74 sq mi (1.92 km^{2})
  - Land: 0.74 sq mi (1.91 km^{2})
  - Water: 0.0039 sq mi (0.01 km^{2})
- Elevation: 443 ft (135 m)

Population (2020)
  - Total: 57
  - Estimate (2025): 56 ▼
  - Density: 77.2/sq mi (29.81/km^{2})
- Time zone: UTC-6 (Central (CST))
  - Summer (DST): UTC-5 (CDT)
- ZIP code: 71847
- Area code: 870
- FIPS code: 05-42410
- GNIS feature ID: 2406122

McCaskill is a town in Hempstead County, Arkansas, United States. As of the 2020 census, McCaskill had a population of 57. It is part of the Hope Micropolitan Statistical Area.

== Geography ==
According to the United States Census Bureau, the city has a total area of 0.7 square miles (1.8 km^{2}), all land.

== Demographics ==
Historical population
Census	Pop.	Note	%±
1930	170		—
1940	236		38.8%
1950	122		−48.3%
1960	62		−49.2%
1970	58		−6.5%
1980	87		50.0%
1990	75		−13.8%
2000	84		12.0%
2010	96		14.3%
2020	57		−40.6%
2025 (est.)	56	▼	−1.8%
U.S. Decennial Census

As of the census of 2000, there were 84 people, 28 households, and 22 families residing in the city. The population density was 113.3 inhabitants per square mile (43.7/km^{2}). There were 34 housing units at an average density of 45.9 per square mile (17.7/km^{2}). The racial makeup of the city was 73.81% White, 15.48% Black or African American, 2.38% Native American, 7.14% from other races, and 1.19% from two or more races. 15.48% of the population were Hispanic or Latino of any race.

There were 28 households, out of which 42.9% had children under the age of 18 living with them, 53.6% were married couples living together, 17.9% had a female householder with no husband present, and 21.4% were non-families. 17.9% of all households were made up of individuals, and 7.1% had someone living alone who was 65 years of age or older. The average household size was 3.00 and the average family size was 3.32.

In the city the population was spread out, with 36.9% under the age of 18, 4.8% from 18 to 24, 26.2% from 25 to 44, 20.2% from 45 to 64, and 11.9% who were 65 years of age or older. The median age was 30 years. For every 100 females, there were 90.9 males. For every 100 females age 18 and over, there were 103.8 males.

The median income for a household in the city was $25,000, and the median income for a family was $26,250. Males had a median income of $30,313 versus $16,875 for females. The per capita income for the city was $8,826. There were 33.3% of families and 37.5% of the population living below the poverty line, including 52.5% of under eighteens and 100.0% of those over 64.
