= Ben Lomond, Arkansas =

- Town
- Location of Ben Lomond in Sevier County, Arkansas.
- Coordinates: 33°50′6″N 94°7′18″W
- Country: United States
- State: Arkansas
- County: Sevier

Area
  - Total: 3.92 sq mi (10.15 km^{2})
  - Land: 3.92 sq mi (10.15 km^{2})
  - Water: 0.0039 sq mi (0.01 km^{2})
- Elevation: 430 ft (130 m)

Population (2020)
  - Total: 140
  - Estimate (2025): 137 ▼
  - Density: 36/sq mi (13.8/km^{2})
- Time zone: UTC-6 (Central (CST))
  - Summer (DST): UTC-5 (CDT)
- ZIP code: 71823
- Area code: 870
- FIPS code: 05-05260
- GNIS feature ID: 2405240

Ben Lomond is a town in Sevier County, Arkansas, United States. The population was 140 at the 2020 census.

== Geography ==
According to the United States Census Bureau, the town has a total area of 10.2 km^{2} (3.9 sq mi), all land.

== Demographics ==
Historical population
Census	Pop.	Note	%±
1910	431		—
1940	406		—
1950	284		−30.0%
1960	157		−44.7%
1970	155		−1.3%
1980	155		0.0%
1990	157		1.3%
2000	126		−19.7%
2010	145		15.1%
2020	140		−3.4%
2025 (est.)	137	▼	−2.1%
U.S. Decennial Census

As of the census of 2000, there were 126 people, 58 households, and 40 families residing in the town. The population density was 12.4 people /km^{2} (32 people/mi^{2}). There were 74 housing units at an average density of 7.3 units /km^{2} (19 units/mi^{2}). The racial makeup of the town was 92.06% White, 1.59% Black or African American, 5.56% Native American, and 0.79% from two or more races. 0.79% of the population were Hispanic or Latino of any race.

There were 58 households, out of which 22.4% had children under the age of 18 living with them, 58.6% were married couples living together, 8.6% had a female householder with no husband present, and 31.0% were non-families. 29.3% of all households were made up of individuals, and 17.2% had someone living alone who was 65 years of age or older. The average household size was 2.17 and the average family size was 2.68.

In the town, the population was spread out, with 19.0% under the age of 18, 9.5% from 18 to 24, 19.0% from 25 to 44, 23.8% from 45 to 64, and 28.6% who were 65 years of age or older. The median age was 48 years. For every 100 females, there were 106.6 males. For every 100 females age 18 and over, there were 88.9 males.

The median income for a household in the town was $26,875, and the median income for a family was $43,750. Males had a median income of $64,375 versus $23,750 for females. The per capita income for the town was $14,580. There were 15.6% of families and 19.5% of the population living below the poverty line, including 26.5% of those under 18 and 19.5% of those over 65.

== Transportation ==
While there is no transit service in Ben Lomond, intercity bus service is provided by Jefferson Lines in nearby Lockesburg.
