= Narrows Dam =

Coordinates: 34.1485°N 93.7156°W

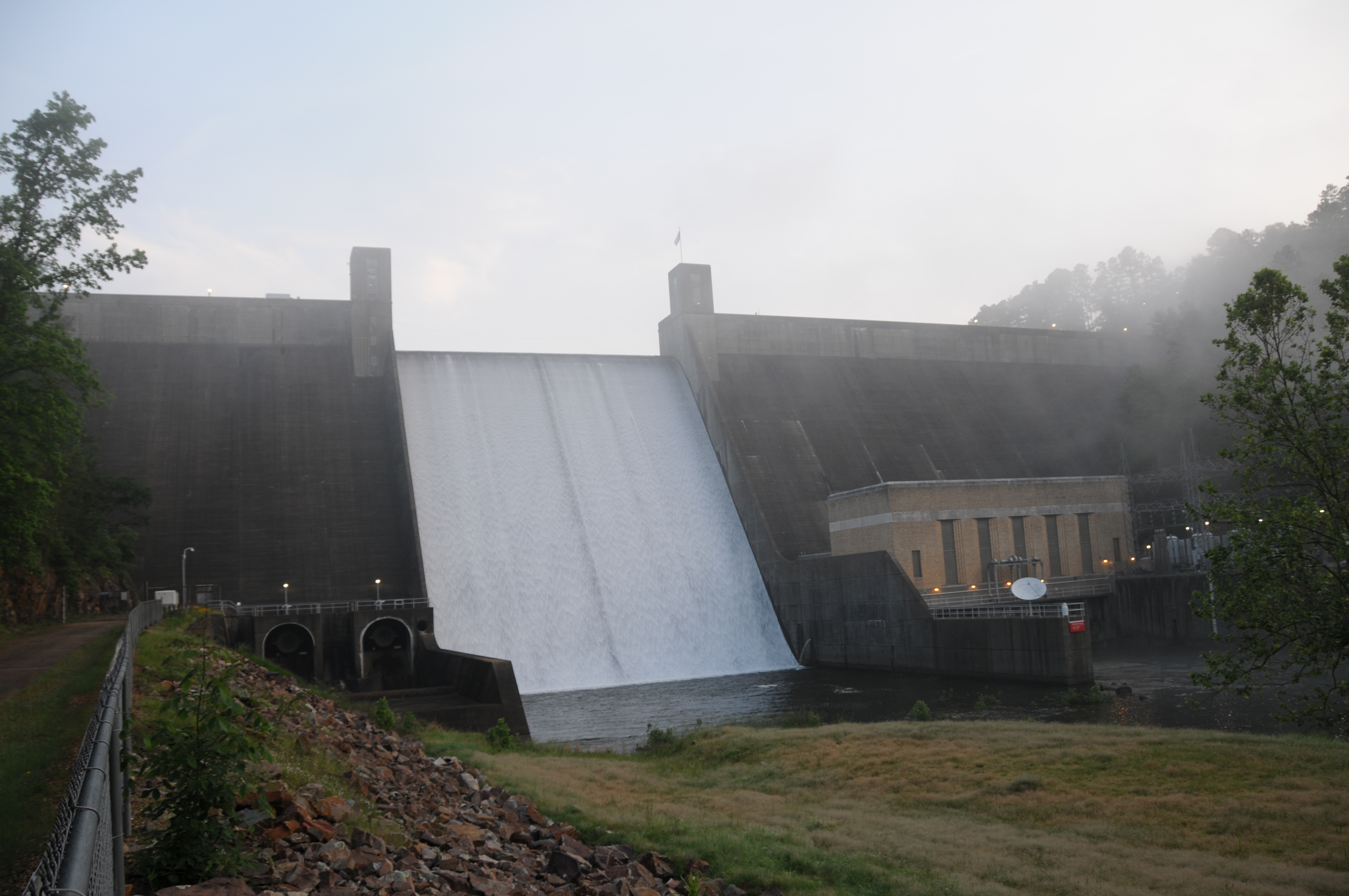
For only second time in its 59-year history water flows over the spillway at Narrows Dam

Narrows Dam is a dam located 6 miles north of Murfreesboro, Arkansas, that impounds the water of the Little Missouri River (Arkansas) to create Lake Greeson. Narrows Dam was authorized as a flood control and hydroelectric power project by the Flood Control Act of 1941. The dam is a feature of the comprehensive plan for the Ouachita River Basin. Lake Greeson is operated for hydroelectric power, recreation, and flood control.

The powerhouse of the dam is located adjacent to the east abutment, and it has a total length of 151 feet. The equipment of the powerhouse is three 8,500 kW·h generating machines. The powerhouse originally had two generators, but a third was placed in 1969. The average annual output is 28,000,000 kW·h.

The dam is named due to its location on the river, The Narrows. During the dam's construction many cemeteries and graveyards had to be removed due to the creation of the new lake. Narrows Dam is located by the Swaha, or Narrows Dam recreational area.

Lake Greeson is divided into three layers so Narrows Dam can work and operate properly. The bottom portion of the lake always remains full so the powerhouse has enough pressure to operate. The middle layer or "Power Storage" portion is used to regulate the flow of water running into the generators of the dam. The top portion or "Flood Storage" is usually empty unless holding floodwater.

A spillway at the top of the dam is used to regulate the top portion of the dam, the spillway contains walls to maneuver the flow of the water, and a stilling basin is placed at the foot of the spillway to dissipate erosion from the spillway water hitting the base of the dam. The spillway is not used frequently because flooding can be regulated by other means, such as the flood control conduits. Because of heavy rains during the first two weeks of May 2009, water poured over the spillway for the first time since 1968.

Construction on the dam by the United States Army Corps of Engineers began in April 1947. The first bucket of concrete was poured in June 1948. The dam was finished in 1950, and dedicated in July 1951.

== See also ==
- List of Arkansas dams and reservoirs
