= Lake Greeson =

Man-made reservoir in Arkansas, United States

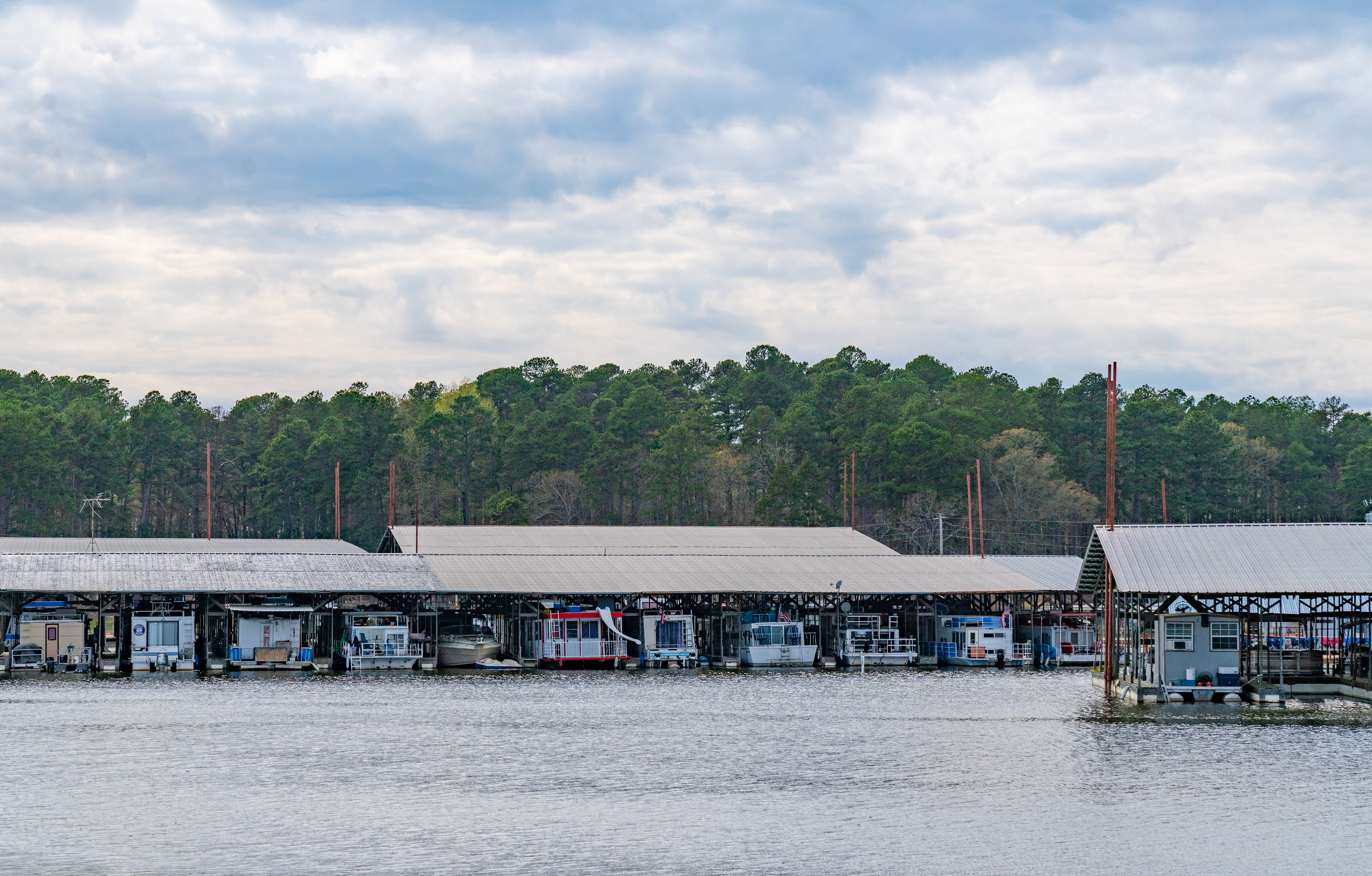
- Houseboats on Lake Greeson at Kirby Landing Public Use Area near Daisy, Arkansas.

- Location within Arkansas
- Location: Pike County, Arkansas, United States
- Coordinates: 34.2098°N 93.7312°W
- Type: reservoir
- Catchment area: 237 mi^{2} (614 km^{2})
- Basin countries: United States

Lake Greeson is a reservoir on the Little Missouri River, about 6 miles (10 km) north of Murfreesboro, Arkansas, United States. Famous for its scenery and recreation, it is surrounded by 15 parks that offer opportunities for camping, fishing, boating, biking, and swimming.

== Overview ==
The lake is created by Narrows Dam, named after the area in which it is located, "The Narrows". Lake Greeson is named after developer Martin White Greeson. The lake also contains Daisy State Park.

Lake Greeson has been recognized by its rich variety of fish, which include: Striped Bass, largemouth, spotted, white bass, flathead and channel catfish. The area below Narrows Dam has a mighty supply of rainbow trout. Other game species exist around Lake Greeson beside fish. Rabbits, squirrels, bobwhite quail, whitetail deer can also be found around the Lake Greeson area. A 35,000-acre (14,164-hectare) Lake Greeson Public Hunting Area can be found west of the lake and provides good hunting areas for hunters.

Lake Greeson provides 45 miles (72 km) of walking, nature, and cycling trails that are there for public use. At the Parker Creek Recreational Area there is a nature walk trail that lets you experience the nature and beauty around an old Cinnabar Mine. The Cinnabar Mine was a popular mine during the 1930s and 1940s before the lake was made in 1950. The Bear Creek Cycle Trail allows riders to experience 31 miles (50 km) of breathtaking beauty around the lake. The trail takes riders across pine covered forest and natural rolling hills.

Lake Greeson is next to the small town of Murfreesboro, which is next to the Crater of Diamonds State Park. The area around Murfreesboro is full of recreational areas.

Martin White Greeson, who was born on November 7, 1866, was the main developer of Lake Greeson. Lake Greeson was basically made to prevent flooding of the Little Missouri River. Construction on the lake began in April 1947, but the first bucket of concrete wasn't poured until June 1948. The lake was then finished in 1950 and dedicated in 1951.

== Statistics ==
- Drainage Area Controlled: 237 mi^{2} (614 km^{2})
- Conservation Pool Elevation: 504 ft (154 m)
- Conservation Pool Storage: 77,600 ac·ft (96,800,000 m^{3})
- Conservation Pool Surface Area: 2,500 ac (1,000 ha)
- Conservation Pool Shoreline: 70 mi (110 km)
- Power Pool Storage: 202,100 ac·ft (0.2493 km^{3})
- Max. Power Pool Elevation: 548 ft (167 m)
- Max. Power Pool Shoreline: 134 mi (216 km)
- Max. Power Pool Surface Area: 7,260 acres (29.4 km^{2})
- Flood Control Pool Elevation: 563 ft (172 m)
- Flood Control Pool Storage: 128,200 ac·ft (158,100,000 m^{3})
- Flood Control Pool Surface Area: 9,800 ac (3,900 ha)
- Flood Control Pool Shoreline: 155 mi (250 km)
- Total Storage: 407,900 ac·ft (503,100,000 m^{3})
- Maximum Height Of Dam: 190 ft (58 m)
- Average Yearly Generated Energy Output Of Dam: 30.4 GW·h (109 TJ)

== See also ==
- List of Arkansas dams and reservoirs
