= Center Point, Howard County, Arkansas =

- Census-designated place
- Location within Arkansas Location within the United States
- Coordinates: 34°01′55″N 93°57′04″W
- Country: United States
- State: Arkansas
- County: Howard
- Elevation: 637 ft (194 m)

Population (2020)
  - Total: 179
- Time zone: UTC-6 (Central (CST))
  - Summer (DST): UTC-5 (CDT)
- Area code: 870
- GNIS feature ID: 2805631

Center Point is an unincorporated community and census-designated place (CDP) in Howard County, Arkansas, United States. It was first listed as a CDP in the 2020 census with a population of 179.

== History ==
When Howard County formed in 1873, Center Point was its first county seat. After the first railroad in the county was built through Nashville—bypassing Center Point—the county seat was moved there in 1884.

== Demographics ==
=== 2020 census ===
Center Point CDP, Arkansas – Racial and ethnic composition Note: the US Census treats Hispanic/Latino as an ethnic category. This table excludes Latinos from the racial categories and assigns them to a separate category. Hispanics/Latinos may be of any race.
Race / Ethnicity (NH = Non-Hispanic)	Pop 2020	% 2020
White alone (NH)	141	78.77%
Black or African American alone (NH)	14	7.82%
Native American or Alaska Native alone (NH)	3	1.68%
Asian alone (NH)	0	0.00%
Pacific Islander alone (NH)	0	0.00%
Some Other Race alone (NH)	1	0.56%
Mixed Race or Multi-Racial (NH)	10	5.59%
Hispanic or Latino (any race)	10	5.59%
Total	179	100.00%

== Notable people ==
- Carl Boles, outfielder for the San Francisco Giants, was born in Center Point.
- Eurith D. Rivers, the 68th governor of Georgia, was born in Center Point.
- Dorothy Shaver, born in Center Point in 1893, was the first woman in the United States to head a multimillion-dollar company, Lord & Taylor.
- Robert G. Shaver, lawyer, colonel in Confederate States Army, and Ku Klux Klan leader.
