= Antoine, Arkansas =

- Town
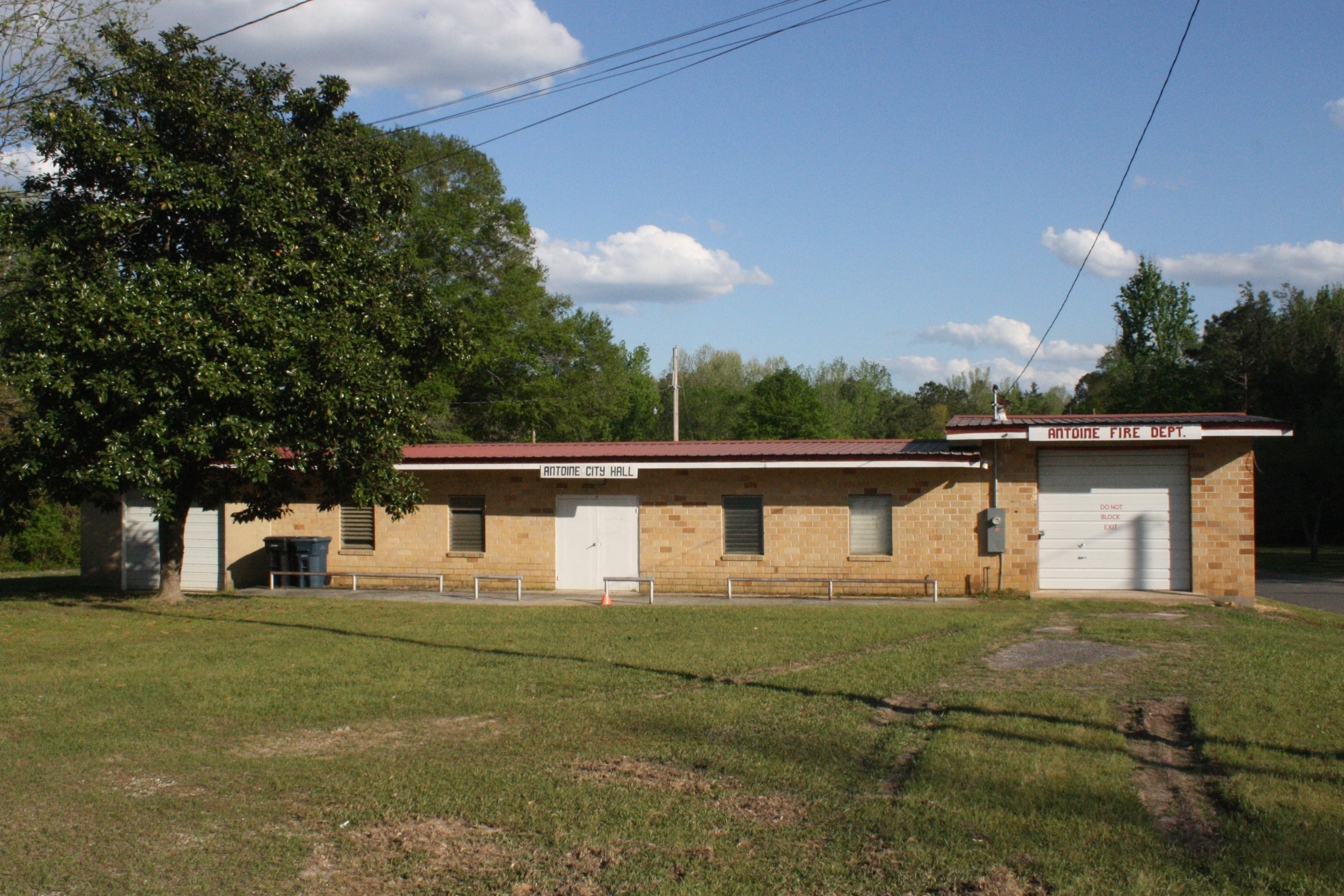
- City Hall and Fire Department

- Location of Antoine in Pike County, Arkansas.
- Coordinates: 34°02′04″N 93°25′21″W
- Country: United States
- State: Arkansas
- County: Pike

Area
  - Total: 0.51 sq mi (1.33 km^{2})
  - Land: 0.51 sq mi (1.31 km^{2})
  - Water: 0.0077 sq mi (0.02 km^{2})
- Elevation: 292 ft (89 m)

Population (2020)
  - Total: 113
  - Estimate (2025): 114 ▲
  - Density: 223/sq mi (86.2/km^{2})
- Time zone: UTC-6 (Central (CST))
  - Summer (DST): UTC-5 (CDT)
- ZIP code: 71922
- Area code: 870
- FIPS code: 05-01540
- GNIS feature ID: 2405156

Antoine is a town in Pike County, Arkansas, United States, along the Antoine River. The population was 113 according to the 2020 census.

== Geography ==
According to the United States Census Bureau, the town has a total area of 1.3 km^{2} (0.5 mi^{2}), all land.

== History ==
The town of Antoine began as a stopping point on the old Southwest Trail to Texas in the early 19th century. It was named for a French trapper who was found dead at his camp along the road (the site of the present town cemetery). The only identification found on the man was his first name, "Antoine". He was buried on the hill by the river and the gravesite became a landmark for travelers. Eventually, the name was given to the river and to the town that grew up beside it. Antoine's grave is located within the bounds of the town cemetery, although the marker has disappeared over time. Antoine is located on Arkansas Highway 26 between Murfreesboro and Arkadelphia in the southeastern section of Pike County. Antoine was one of the first settlements in what is now Pike County. It had characteristics of what our forefathers were seeking - rich level farmland and located on the bank of the Antoine River, giving them an adequate supply of water. To the north is an elevated mountain range ideal for trapping.

The town did not suffer much disaster during the Civil War, even though Union Soldiers were located in the area. The only incident recalled was about two young Antoine boys whose father was away in the Confederate Army. Being the only men at home they brought corn into Antoine to the gristmill for their mother. As they were leaving they were seized by the Yankee soldiers, their meal taken and the boys hanged from a large chinquapin tree just north of the old John Canter Home.

By 1890 the town had sprung up and had a post office, a bank, a church, school, cotton gin, gristmill, bottling works, sawmill, blacksmith shop, two hotels, drug store, hardware, billiard and pool hall, cafe, doctor's office, city hall, and several merchandise stores. During this time, railroad connections were established with Gurdon to the south, Amity to the north, and Delight to the west. The historic railroad trestle over the Antoine River was built in 1908 and remains in use today. The first church house in Antoine was Union Church located where the Methodist Church now stands. Brooks Stell of Delight organized the Church of Christ which was the second church to form. When he held a meeting in the Union Church building in 1908, the response was so great that he continued the meeting and moved his followers to the old Seven-Up school house across the Wolf Creek, near the Joe Thomas home. About this time there was being erected a new two-story brick school house, and when it was completed the congregation bought the little wood-frame school for their meeting place. It was located in the vicinity of where Guy Howell's home now stands. The present church building was erected in 1930. The Methodists continued on in the old Union building and later built a beautiful brick building. Sometime later the Baptist Church was organized.

Some of the names associated with the public businesses of Antoine around the turn of the century were blacksmiths: Dan and Charlie Hammonds, the Cagles and Dixons; cotton gin: Cagles and Bartons; bottling works: Mr. Manesco; cafe: George Mires; postmaster, hotel and sawmill: J. T. Cooper; merchandising stores were operated by Barton and Hardin, Charlie Cash, A. D. Meeks and Brooks. The officers and directors of the Bank of Antoine, in 1908, were James P. Dunn, president; O.O. Meeks, vice-president; E. E. Groom, cashier; and Mrs. R. A. Barton and Fred Haptonstad, directors.

In 1911, Antoine's entire south side, where the bank, hardware, drugstore, cafe, and several general stores were located, was destroyed. Sometime later the downtown hotel was destroyed by another fire. The hotel was rebuilt by a Mr. Meeks. In 1929 on the north side the structure known as the old Dunn building, burned. It contained Will Smith's barber shop, the pool hall, and a general store. In 1947 the school burned. The school was never replaced. The high school had already been consolidated with Delight School and after the building burned the remaining youngsters attended school in Delight. Some of the earlier teachers of Antoine were Professor Groom, Rush Dixon, Myrtice Wingfield, Nellie Stark, Audrie Mansfield, a Mr. Story (who had two sons of his own whom he took upstairs and whipped just as surely as the day began). J. H. Hile was a teacher and preacher with the Church of Christ around 1900, showing people his exhibits and performing. People from all around would load up their wagons and came to the school to see these performances. Sometimes they would last almost all night.

Some of the older doctors of Antoine were Dr. Hardin, Dr. James, Dr. Baker, Dr. Burleson, and Dr. Hendrix. Antoine suffered another great shock in the death of Dr. Albert Hendrix, a young doctor who had set up practice in an office in Hardin's drugstore. He was boarding in the home of George and Mat Mires, and on the evening of January 10, 1913, he had a call to the Piney Grove community to see Mrs. Maude Lee. Finding her condition stable, he decided to check Luther Sparks' wife, another patient he had been treating, while in the community. While he was making his rounds there had been an extremely hard rain. On his return trip to Antoine, Wolf Creek and Mill Slough overflowed their banks. A new bridge had been built across Mill Slough but the road had not been finished where the bridge could be used for crossing. He tried to cross Mill Slough at the ferry but the current was so strong that when he drove his buggy into the water it was immediately washed away. His buggy was found lodged against the new bridge but his body had been swept away and was found about a quarter mile downstream several days later.

Some of the familiar faces seen around Antoine in 1923 were the Rileys, Canters, Cashes, Rices, Craigs, Bolts, Wombals, Hares, Dixons, Coopers, Morrises, Dunns, Goldens, Carrolls, Walls, Harps, McDonalds, Copelands, Lambs, Gentrys, Smiths, Wingfields, Nashes, Bottoms, Osburns, Lawsons, Prices, Rogers, Bierds, Mays, Rawlings, Calhouns, Howells, Clarks, Hammonds, Phillions, Caldwells, Hankins, Burlesons, Bartons, Jacksons, Stovers, Halls, Sam Jones, Cow Bailey, King Cole, May Ollie, and her twin boys, Troy and Truman. Some of the later businessmen of Antoine, before 1930, were Kelly Caldwell, Will Smith, Ollie Meeks, E. V. Canter, Will Lamb, Clyde Wingfield, Bob Bransford, Olvy Johnson, Bob Rawlings, Olen Hendrix, Kirk McDonald, Jim Wingfield, Joel Wigfield, and Ernest Wingfield.

During the Great Depression and afterwards, Antoine experienced a slow but steady decline in population.

Today, the main activities include: logging, ranching, trucking, farming, and tourism. Most residents work in the nearby cities of: Arkadelphia, Hope, or Nashville.

== Demographics ==
Historical population
Census	Pop.	Note	%±
1930	210		—
1940	233		11.0%
1950	209		−10.3%
1960	163		−22.0%
1970	182		11.7%
1980	194		6.6%
1990	160		−17.5%
2000	156		−2.5%
2010	117		−25.0%
2020	113		−3.4%
2025 (est.)	114	▲	0.9%
U.S. Decennial Census

According to the census of 2000, there were 156 people, 64 households, and 44 families residing in the town. The population density was 118.1/km^{2} (305.3/mi^{2}). There were 74 housing units at an average density of 56.0/km^{2} (144.8/mi^{2}). The racial makeup of the town was 93.59% White, 5.77% Black or African American, and 0.64% of people with two or more races. 0.00% of the population was Hispanic or Latino.

There were 64 households, out of which 31.3% had children under the age of 18 living with them, 59.4% were married couples living together, 7.8% had a female head of the household with no husband present, and 29.7% were non-families. 29.7% of all households were made up of individuals, and 17.2% had someone living alone who was 65 years of age or older. The average household size was 2.44 and the average family size was 3.02.

The age of the local population was spread out—with 26.3% under the age of 18, 8.3% from 18 to 24, 21.2% from 25 to 44, 26.3% from 45 to 64, and 17.9% who were 65 years of age or older. The median age was 42 years. For every 100 females, there were 83.5 males. For every 100 females age 18 and over, there were 88.5 males.

The median income for a household in the town was $23,750 and the median income for a family was $24,583. Males had a median income of $14,583, versus $13,333 for females. The per capita income for the town was $13,191. About 7.3% of families and 12.8% of the population were below the poverty line, including 15.9% of those under the age of eighteen and 18.2% of those 65 or over.
