= Timeline of United States discoveries =

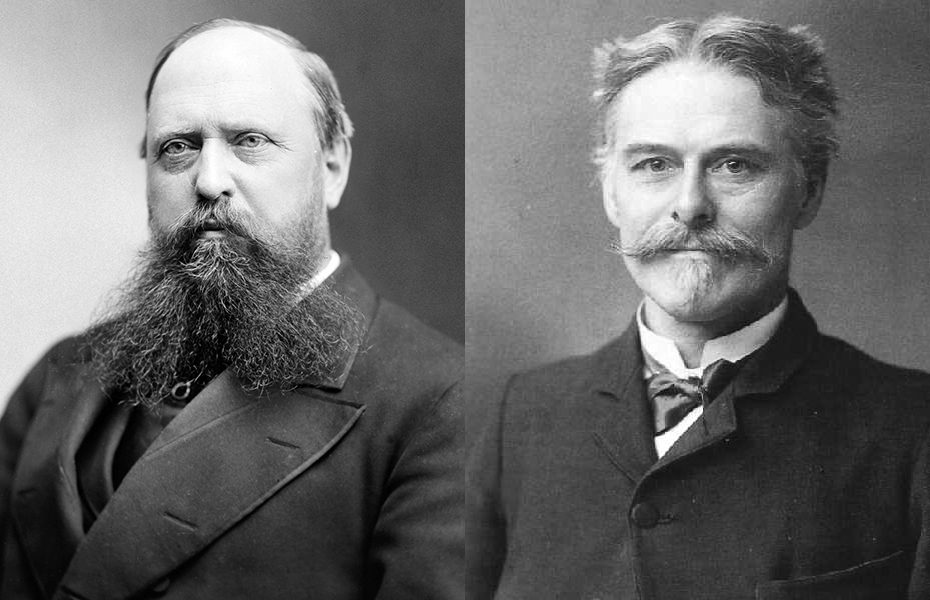
The rivalry between Othniel Charles Marsh (left) and Edward Drinker Cope (right) sparked the "Bone Wars."

Timeline of United States discoveries encompasses the breakthroughs of human thought and knowledge of new scientific findings, phenomena, places, things, and what was previously unknown to exist. From a historical standpoint, the timeline below of United States discoveries dates from the 18th century to the current 21st century, which have been achieved by discoverers who are either native-born or naturalized citizens of the United States.

With an emphasis of discoveries in the fields of astronomy, physics, chemistry, medicine, biology, geology, paleontology, and archaeology, United States citizens acclaimed in their professions have contributed much. For example, the "Bone Wars," beginning in 1877 and ending in 1892, was an intense period of rivalry between two American paleontologists, Edward Drinker Cope and Othniel Charles Marsh, who initiated several expeditions throughout North America in the pursuit of discovering, identifying, and finding new species of dinosaur fossils. In total, their large efforts resulted in when 142 species of dinosaurs being discovered. With the founding of the National Aeronautics and Space Administration (NASA) in 1958, a vision and continued commitment by the United States of finding extraterrestrial and astronomical discoveries has helped the world to better understand the Solar System and universe. As one example, in 2008, the Phoenix lander discovered the presence of frozen water on the planet Mars of which scientists such as Peter H. Smith of the University of Arizona Lunar and Planetary Laboratory (LPL) had suspected before the mission confirmed its existence.

== Eighteenth century ==
1747 Charge conservation

- In physics, charge conservation is the principle that electric charge can neither be created nor destroyed. The quantity of electric charge, the amount of positive charge minus the amount of negative charge in the universe, is always conserved. As part of his groundbreaking work in electricity, Benjamin Franklin around the year 1747 discovered the principle of charge conservation when he came to the conclusion that the two states of electricity, positive and negative, the charge is never created or destroyed but instead transferable from one place to another.

1796 Johnston Atoll

- Johnston Atoll, a territory of the United States, part of the Pacific Islands Heritage Marine National Monument, and a part of the wider United States Minor Outlying Islands, is a 50-square-mile (130 km2) atoll in the North Pacific Ocean about 750 miles (1,210 kilometers) west of the U.S. state of Hawaii. There are four islands located on the coral reef platform, two natural islands, Johnston Island and Sand Island, which have been expanded by coral dredging, as well as North Island (Akau) and East Island (Hikina), an additional two artificial islands formed by coral dredging. The sovereignty of Johnston Atoll was disputed and claimed by the Kingdom of Hawaii beginning in 1858 until Hawaii itself was eventually annexed by the United States as the Hawaii Territory in 1898. Johnston Atoll is now administered and managed by the United States Fish and Wildlife Service, an agency of the United States Department of Interior. In 1796, Johnston Atoll was discovered accidentally by U.S. Captain Joseph Pierpoint when his ship, the American brig Sally, ran aground.

1798 Tabuaeran

- Tabuaeran, also known as Fanning Island or Fanning Atoll (both Gilbertese and English names are recognized) is one of the Line Islands located in the central Pacific Ocean. With a population of approximately 2,500, much of the island's economy relies upon the cruise industry. Formerly under British rule, Tabuaeran now is a part of the Republic of Kiribati. Tabuaeran was discovered on June 11, 1798, by U.S. Captain Edmund Fanning, at 3 a.m., while on a voyage to China aboard his ship, Betsy.

1798 Teraina

- Teraina, also known as Washington Island, is an inhabited coral atoll located in the central Pacific Ocean that is 282 nautical miles (522 km) north of the equator, 75 miles (121 km) northwest of Tabuaeran, 238 miles (383 km) northwest of Christmas Island, and 120 miles (190 km) southeast of the U.S. territory of Palmyra Atoll. Formerly under British rule, Teraina is now a part of the Republic of Kiribati. Obsolete names of Teraina are Prospect Island and New York Island. The island consists of nine Polynesian villages. Teraina was discovered by U.S. Captain Edmund Fanning, in the American ship Betsy, on June 12, 1798.

1798 Palmyra Atoll

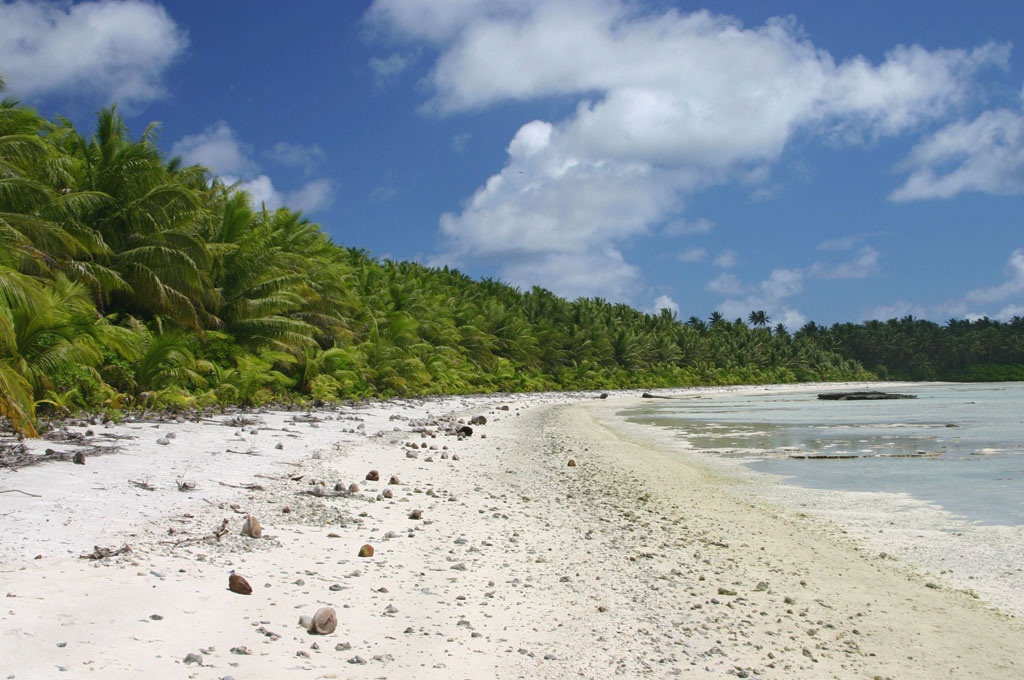
Palmyra Atoll's North Beach.

Palmyra Atoll, a territory of the United States, part of the Pacific Islands Heritage Marine National Monument, and a part of the wider United States Minor Outlying Islands, is a 4.6 sq mi (12 km^{2}) atoll located in the North Pacific Ocean almost due south of the Hawaiian Islands, roughly halfway between the U.S. state of Hawaii and the U.S. territory of American Samoa. The atoll consists of an extensive reef, two shallow lagoons, and some 50 sand and reef-rock islets and bars covered with lush, tropical vegetation. The islets of the atoll are all connected, except Sand Island and the two Home Islets in the west and Barren Island in the east. The largest island is Cooper Island in the north, followed by Kaula Island in the south. Cooper Island is privately owned by The Nature Conservancy and managed as a nature reserve. The rest of the atoll is managed by the United States Fish and Wildlife Service and is directly administered by the Office of Insular Affairs, an agency of the United States Department of Interior. Palmyra Atoll's history is long and colorful. It was first sighted on June 14, 1798, by Captain Edmund Fanning and officially discovered in 1802 by Captain Sawle of the American ship Palmyra.

1798 Kingman Reef

- Kingman Reef, a territory of the United States, part of the Pacific Islands Heritage Marine National Monument, and a part of the wider United States Minor Outlying Islands, is a largely submerged, uninhabited triangular shaped reef, 9.5 nautical miles (18 kilometers) east-west and 5 nautical miles (9 kilometers) north-south, located in the North Pacific Ocean, roughly halfway between the Hawaiian Islands and the U.S. territory of American Samoa. It is the northernmost of the Northern Line Islands and lies 36 nautical miles (67 kilometers) northwest of the next closest island, the U.S. territory of Palmyra Atoll, and 930 nautical miles (1,720 kilometers) south of Honolulu, Hawaii. Kingman Reef is now administered and managed by the United States Fish and Wildlife Service, an agency of the United States Department of Interior. First known as "Dangerous Reef", Kingman Reef was discovered on June 14, 1798, by U.S. Captain Edmund Fanning.

== Nineteenth century ==
1821 South Orkney Islands

- The South Orkney Islands are a group of islands in the Southern Ocean, about 375 miles (604 km) northeast of the tip of the Antarctic Peninsula. As part of the British Antarctic Territory, the islands have a total area of about 240 square miles (620 km^{2}). In December 1821, Captain Nathaniel B. Palmer as commander of the James Monroe, along with British sealer George Powell, co-discovered the South Orkney Islands.

1822 Howland Island

- Howland Island, a territory of the United States and a part of the United States Minor Outlying Islands, is an uninhabited coral island located just north of the equator in the central Pacific Ocean, about 1,700 nautical miles (3,100 kilometres) southwest of Honolulu, Hawaii. The island lies almost halfway between the U. S state of Hawaii and Australia. Its nearest neighbor is Baker Island, 37 nautical miles (68 kilometers) to the south. Now known as a National Wildlife Refuge, Howland Island is an insular area administered and managed by the United States Fish and Wildlife Service. First known as "Worth Island", Howland Island as it later was named, was discovered by U.S. Captain George B. Worth aboard the whaler Oena in 1822.

1825 Baker Island

- Baker Island, a territory of the United States and a part of the United States Minor Outlying Islands, is an uninhabited atoll located just north of the equator in the central Pacific Ocean about 1,700 miles (2,700 kilometers) southwest of Honolulu, Hawaii. The island lies almost halfway between the U.S. state of Hawaii and Australia. Its nearest neighbor is Howland Island, 37 nautical miles (68 kilometers) to the north. Now known as a National Wildlife Refuge, Baker Island is an insular area administered and managed by the United States Fish and Wildlife Service. According to an article in Pacific Magazine dated in 2000, Baker island was reportedly first sighted in 1825 by U.S. Captain Obed Starbuck in the ship Lopez. The newly discovered island was named New Nantucket (and also as Phoebe). It was in 1832 that U.S. Captain Michael Baker, after whom the island is now named, also came to the island aboard the whaler Gideon Howard.

1831 Chloroform

- Chloroform is a chemical compound in the trihalomethane family that does not undergo combustion in air, although it will burn when mixed with more flammable substances. Chloroform was first discovered in July 1831 by American physician Samuel Guthrie, independently a few months later by French chemist Eugène Soubeiran and then by German chemist Justus von Liebig.

1858 Hadrosaurus foulki

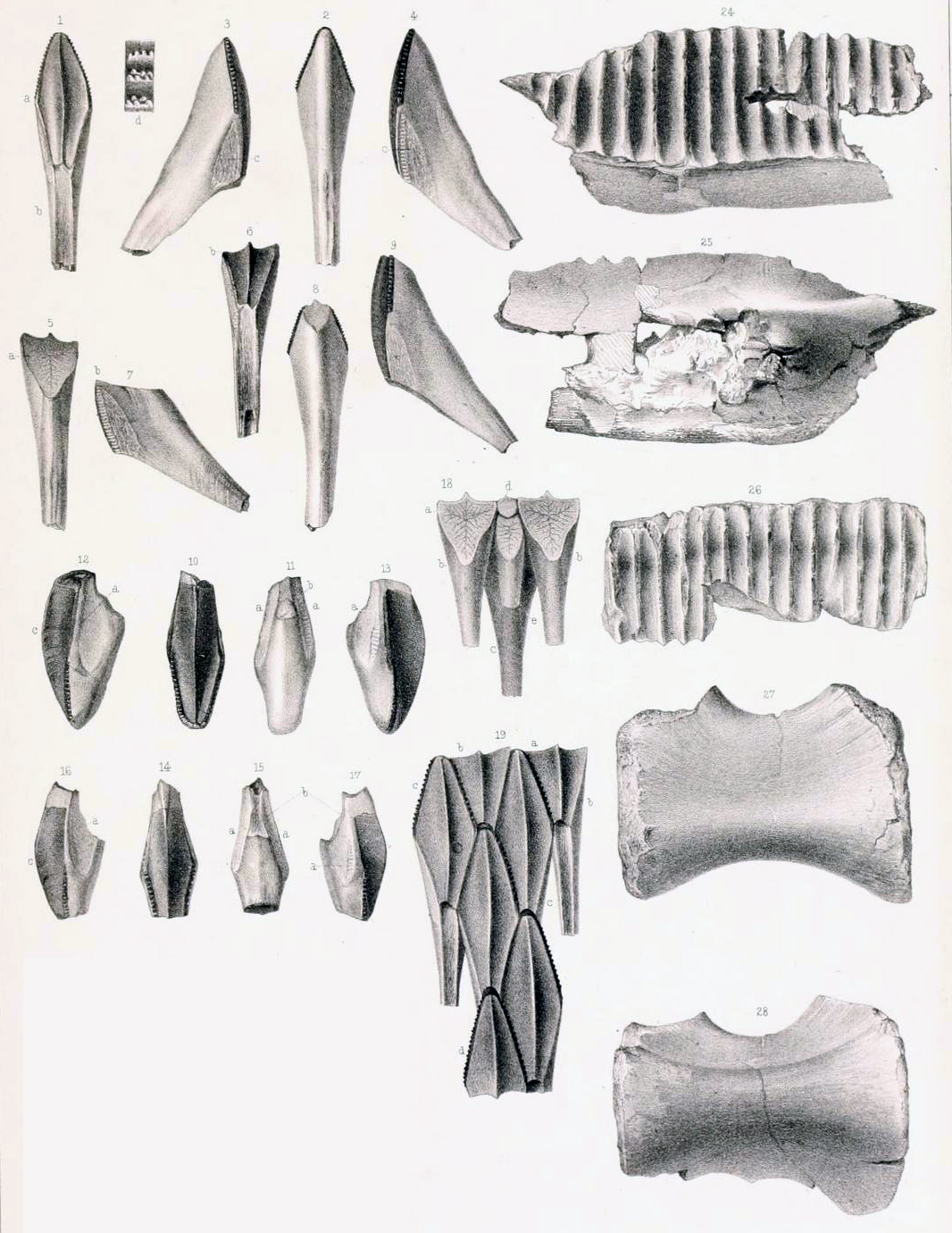
Plate XIII from Cretaceous Reptiles of the United States, showing various Hadrosaurus teeth (top) and vertebrae (bottom right). The teeth on the bottom left belonged to Astrodon.

Hadrosaurus was a dubious genus of a hadrosaurid dinosaur that lived near what is now the coast of New Jersey in the late Cretaceous, around 80 million years ago. It was likely bipedal for the purposes of running, but could use its forelegs to support itself while grazing. Like all hadrosaurids, Hadrosaurus was herbivorous. Its teeth suggest it ate twigs and leaves. In the summer of 1858 while vacationing in Haddonfield, New Jersey, William Parker Foulke discovered the world's first nearly-complete skeleton of any species of dinosaur, the Hadrosaurus (named by Joseph Leidy), an event that would rock the scientific world and forever change our view of natural history. To this day, Haddonfield, New Jersey is considered to be "ground zero" of dinosaur paleontology.

1859 Midway Atoll

Midway Atoll, better known as Midway Island or collectively as the Midway islands, is a territory of the United States and a part of the wider United States Minor Outlying Islands that is located in the North Pacific Ocean near the northwestern end of the Hawaiian Islands. As a 2.4-square-mile (6.2 km^{2}) atoll, Midway Atoll is one-third of the way between Honolulu, Hawaii and Tokyo, Japan, approximately 140 nautical miles (259 kilometers) east of the International Date Line, about 2,800 nautical miles (5,200 kilometers) west of San Francisco, California, and 2,200 nautical miles (4,100 kilometers) east of Tokyo, Japan. Midway Atoll consists of a ring-shaped barrier reef and several sand islets. The two significant pieces of land, Sand Island and Eastern Island, provide habitat for millions of seabirds. Because of the importance of marine and biological environment, Midway Atoll is an insular area known as the Midway Atoll National Wildlife Refuge that is administered and managed by the United States Fish and Wildlife Service, an agency of the United States Department of Interior. Midway Atoll is perhaps best known as the site of the Battle of Midway, fought in World War II on June 4–6, 1942 and the decisive turning point of the Pacific War when the United States Navy defeated an attack by the Empire of Japan. First known as "Middlebrooks Islands", Midway Atoll was discovered by U.S. Captain N.C. Brooks aboard his ship, Gambia, on July 8, 1859.

1859 Petroleum jelly

Petroleum jelly, petrolatum or soft paraffin is a semi-solid mixture of hydrocarbons originally promoted as a topical ointment for its healing properties. The raw material for petroleum jelly was discovered in 1859 by Robert Chesebrough, a chemist from New York. In 1870, this product was branded as Vaseline Petroleum Jelly.

1873 Chemical potential

- The chemical potential, symbolized by μ, is a thermodynamic concept developed by the American scientist Josiah Willard Gibbs in his 1873 paper A Method of Geometrical Representation of the Thermodynamic Properties of Substances by Means of Surfaces. Gibbs's work had an enormous impact on the development of modern physical chemistry.

1875 Red Delicious

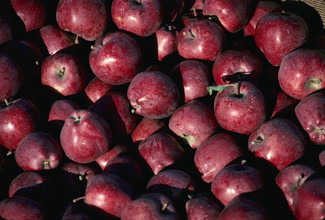
Bushels of Red Delicious apples.

The Red Delicious is a clone of apple cultigen, now comprising more than 50 cultivars. The Red Delicious apple was discovered in 1875 by Jesse Hiatt on his farm in Peru, Iowa. Believing that the seedling was nothing more than nuisance. After chopping down the tree three times, Hiatt decided to let the tree grow and eventually, it produced an unknown and new harvest of red apples. Hiatt would eventually sell the rights to this type of apple to the Stark Brothers Nurseries and Orchards who renamed it the Red Delicious.

1877 Deimos

Deimos is the smaller and outer of Mars' two moons. It was discovered by Asaph Hall in 1877.

1877 Phobos

Phobos is the larger and closer of Mars' two small moons. It was discovered by Asaph Hall in 1877.

1888 Cliff Palace

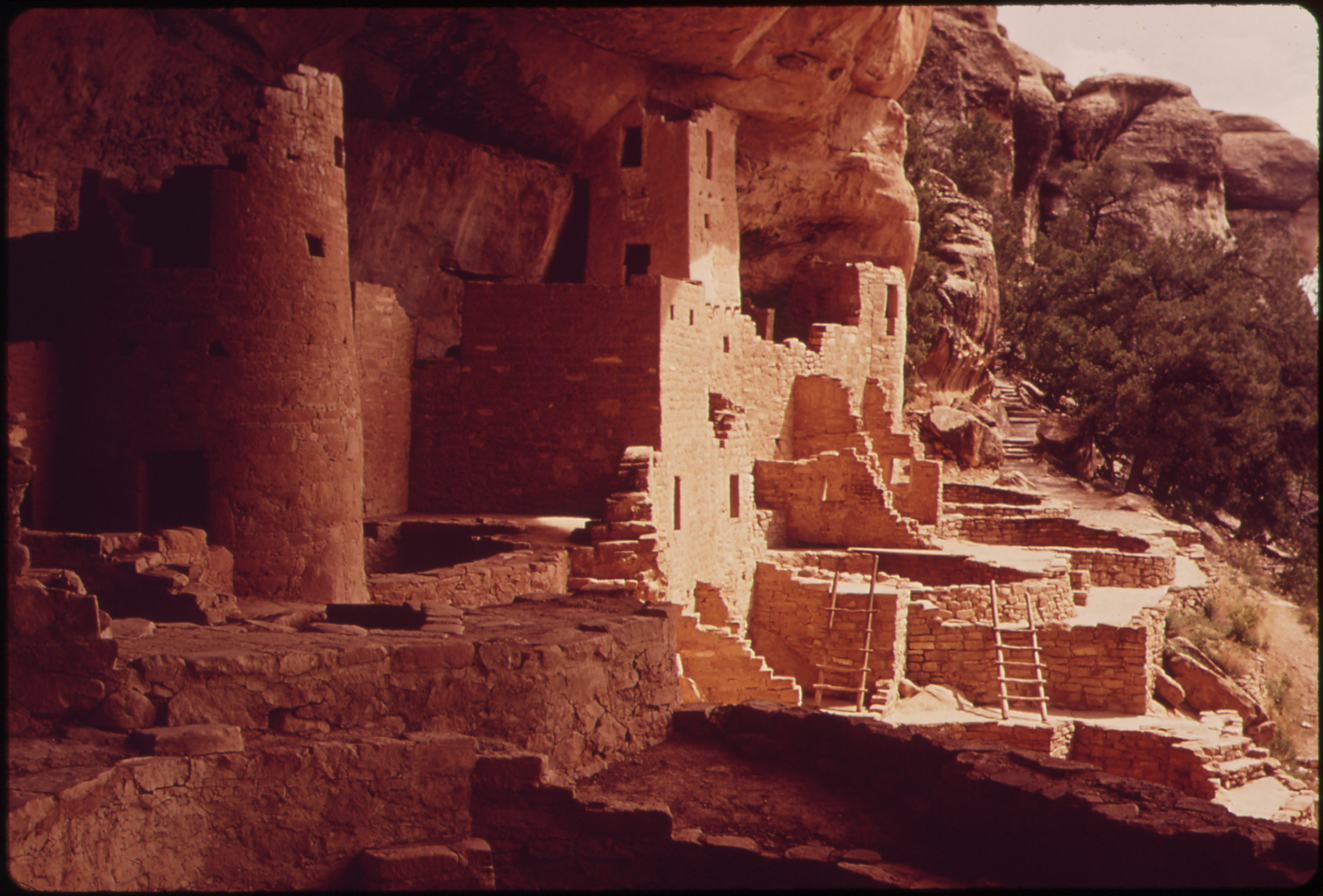
Cliff Palace at Mesa Verde National Park, Colorado.

The Cliff Palace is the largest cliff dwelling in North America. The structure built by the Ancestral Puebloans is located in Mesa Verde National Park in their former homeland region. The cliff dwelling and park are in the southwestern corner of Colorado, in the Southwestern United States. The ancient ruins of Cliff Palace were co-discovered during a snowstorm in December 1888 by Richard Wetherill and Charlie Mason who were searching for stray cattle on Chapin Mesa.

1889 Torosaurus

Torosaurus was a herbivorous dinosaur that lived during the Late Cretaceous Period about 70 million years ago in what is now North America. Torosaurus had an enormous head that measured 8 feet (2.4 m) in length. Its skull is one of the largest known up to date, no other land animal has ever had a skull larger than Torosaurus. Torosaurus frill made up about one-half the total skull length. The first fossils of Torosaurus were discovered in 1889, in Wyoming by John Bell Hatcher. The American paleontologist Othniel Charles Marsh would later name the specimen Torosaurus latus, in recognition of the bull-like size of its skull and its large eyebrow horns. Ever since, the specimen has been in display at the Peabody Museum in New Haven, Connecticut.

1891 Thescelosaurus

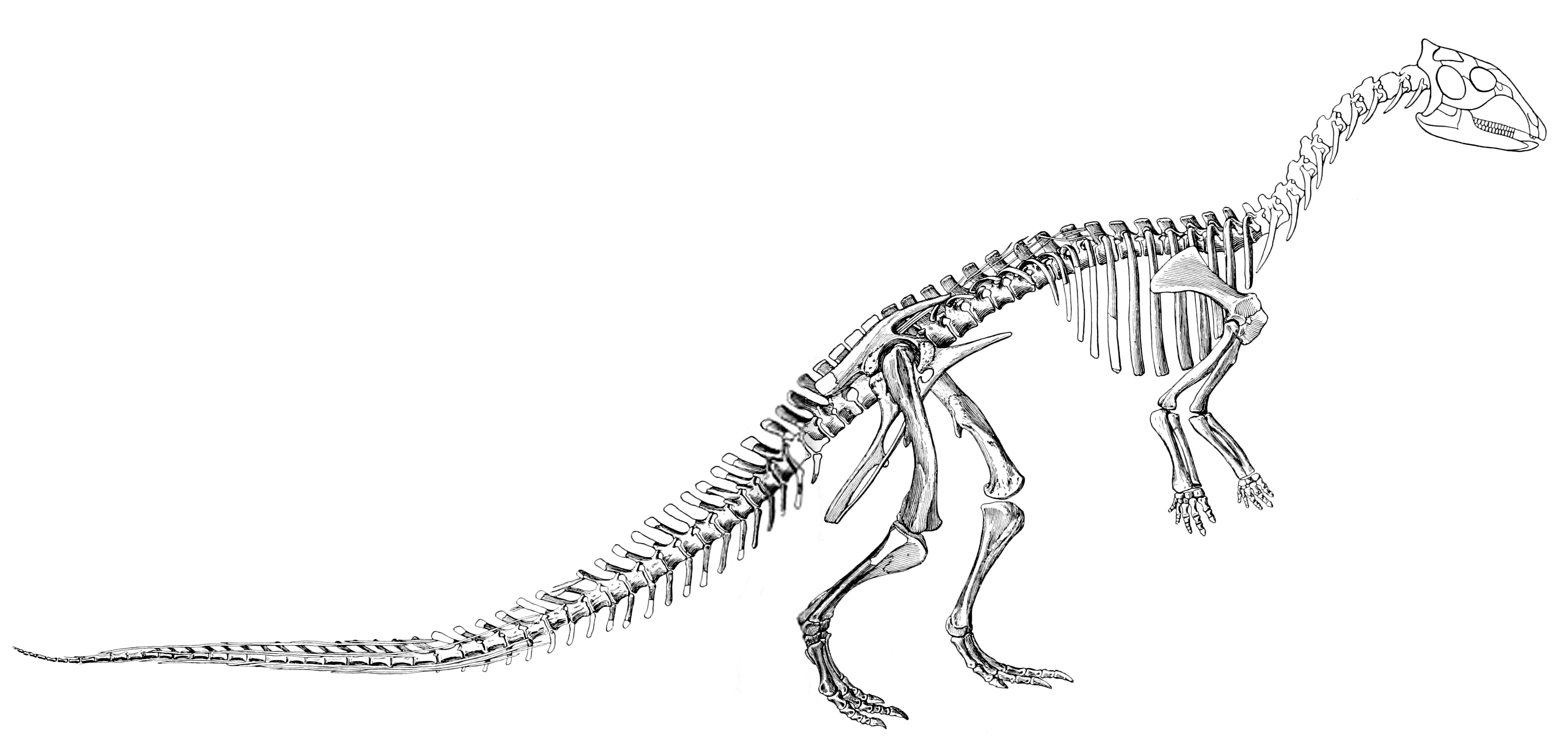
Charles Gilmore's reconstruction of Thescelosaurus in 1915.

Thescelosaurus was a bipedal dinosaur with a sturdy build, small wide hands, and a long pointed snout from the Late Cretaceous Period, approximately 66 million years ago. As a herbivore, Thescelosaurus was not a tall dinosaur and probably browsed the ground selectively to find food. Its leg structure and proportionally heavy build suggests that it was not a fast runner like other dinosaurs. The first fossils of Thescelosaurus were co-discovered in 1891 by John Bell Hatcher and William H. Utterback, in Wyoming. However, this discovery remained stored until Charles W. Gilmore named the dinosaur in 1913.

1892 Amalthea

Amalthea is the third moon of Jupiter in order of distance from the planet. It was discovered on September 9, 1892, by Edward Emerson Barnard.

1899 Phoebe

- Phoebe is an irregular satellite of Saturn. It was discovered by William Henry Pickering on March 17, 1899, from photographic plates that had been taken starting on August 16, 1898, at Arequipa, Peru by DeLisle Stewart.

== Twentieth century ==
1902 Tyrannosaurus

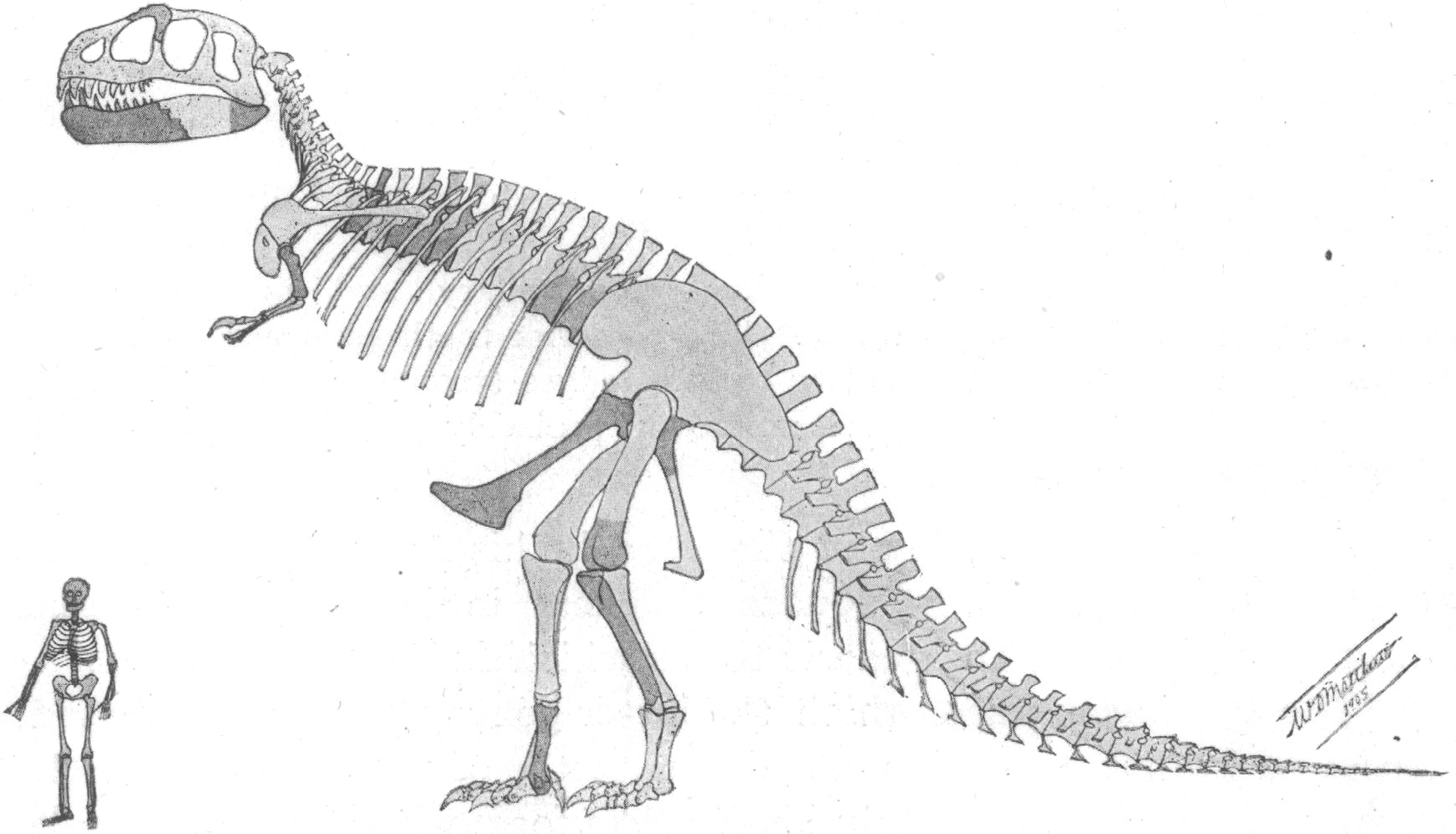
The first sketch of a Tyrannosaurus skeleton in relation to a human skeleton ever published.

Tyrannosaurus, a bipedal carnivore, is a genus of theropod dinosaur. The species Tyrannosaurus rex, commonly abbreviated to T. rex, is a fixture in popular culture. It lived throughout what is now western North America, with a much wider range than other tyrannosaurids. Fossils are found in a variety of rock formations dating to the last two million years of the Cretaceous Period, 67 to 66 million years ago. It was among the last non-avian dinosaurs to exist prior to the Cretaceous–Tertiary extinction event. In 1902, the first skeleton of Tyrannosaurus was discovered in Hell Creek, Montana by American paleontologist Barnum Brown. In 1908, Brown discovered a better preserved skeleton of Tyrannosaurus.

1908 Seyfert galaxies

- Seyfert galaxies are a class of galaxies with nuclei that produce spectral line emission from highly ionized gas, named after Carl Keenan Seyfert, the astronomer who first identified the class in 1943 although they were first discovered by Edward A. Fath in 1908 while he was at the Lick Observatory.

1909 Burgess Shale

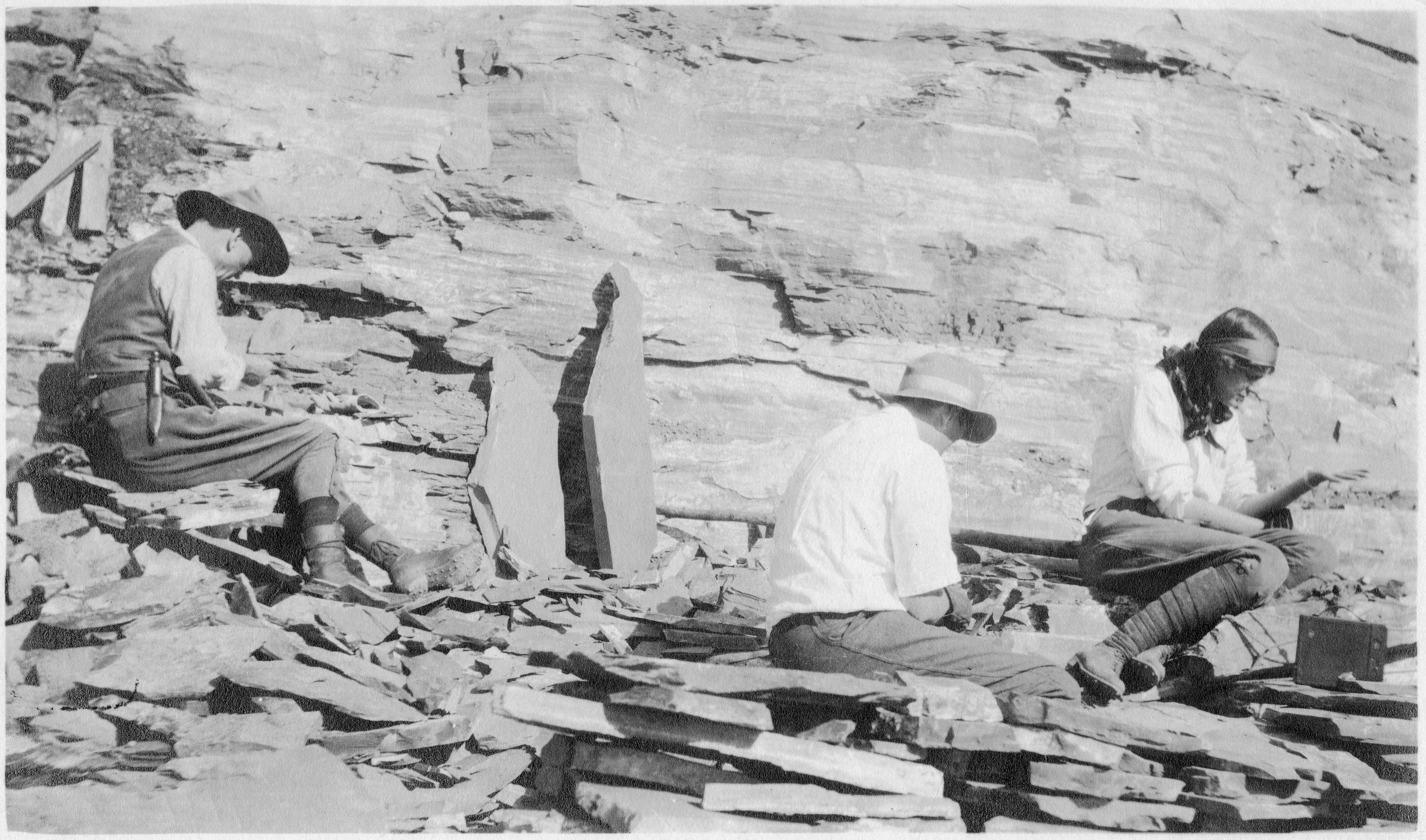
Charles Doolittle Walcott seen excavating the Burgess Shale (near Field, British Columbia) with his wife Helen and son Sidney, in the quarry which now bears his name.

The formation of Burgess Shale — located in the Canadian Rockies of British Columbia — is one of the world's most celebrated fossil fields, and the best of its kind. It is famous for the exceptional preservation of the soft parts of its fossils. It is 505 million years (Middle Cambrian) old, one of the earliest soft-parts fossil beds. The rock unit is a black shale, and crops out at a number of localities near the town of Field, British Columbia in the Yoho National Park. The Burgess Shale was discovered by American palaeontologist Charles Doolittle Walcott in 1909, towards the end of the season's fieldwork. He returned in 1910 with his sons, establishing a quarry on the flanks of Fossil Ridge. The significance of soft-bodied preservation, and the range of organisms he recognized as new to science, led him to return to the quarry almost every year until 1924. At this point, aged 74, he had amassed over 65,000 specimens. Describing the fossils was a vast task, pursued by Walcott until his death in 1927.

1910 Propane

- Propane is a three-carbon alkane, normally a gas, but compressible to a transportable liquid. It is derived from other petroleum products during oil or natural gas processing. It is commonly used as a fuel for engines, barbecues, portable stoves, and residential central heating. Propane was first identified as a volatile component in gasoline by Dr. Walter O. Snelling of the U.S. Bureau of Mines in 1910.

1912 Golden Delicious

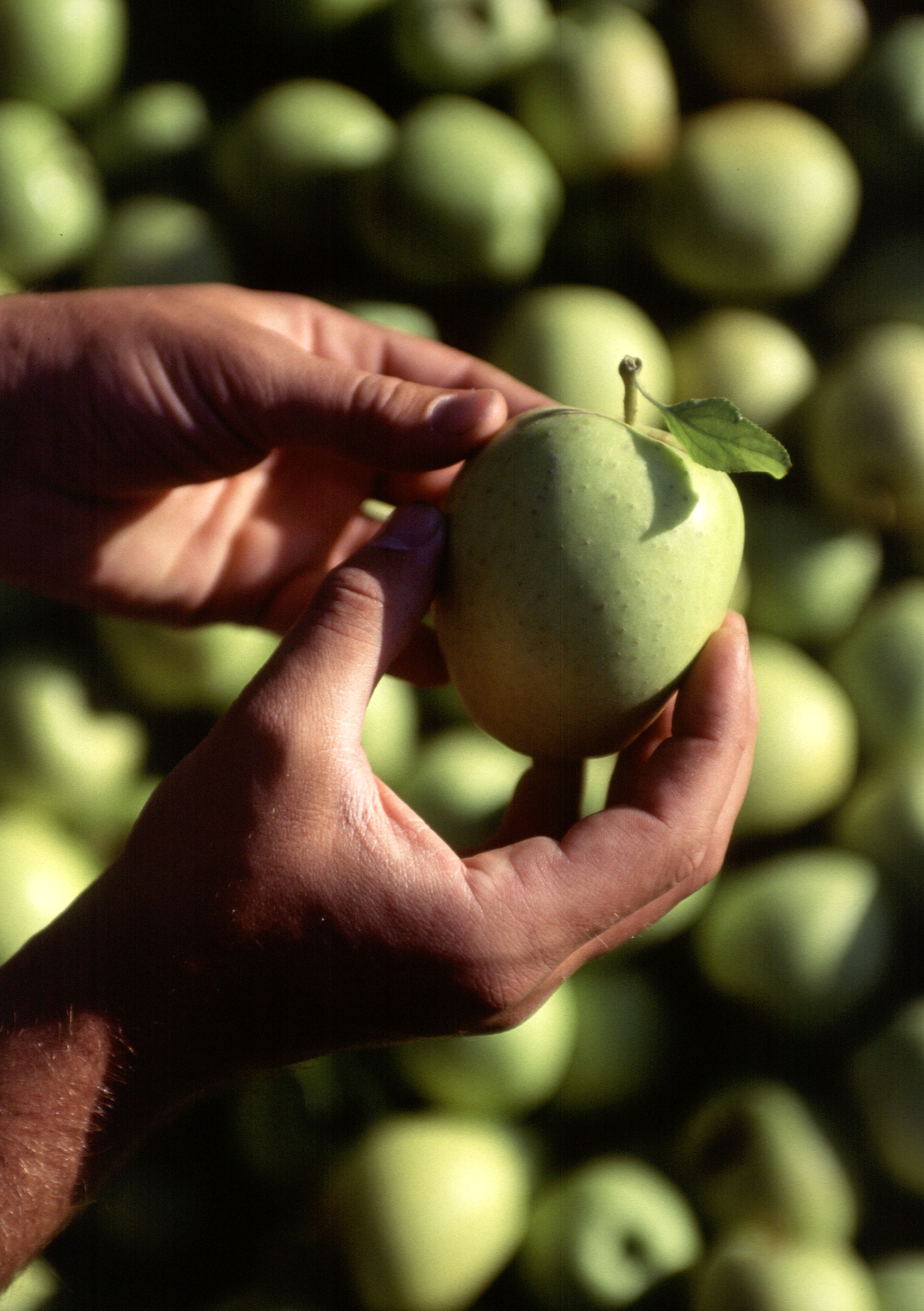
Golden Delicious

Golden Delicious is a large, yellow skinned cultivar of apple and very sweet to the taste. The original Golden Delicious tree is thought to have been discovered by Anderson Mullins on a hill near Porter Creek in Clay County, West Virginia. The Stark Brothers Nursery soon purchased the tree which spawned a leading cultivar in the United States and abroad. The Golden Delicious is the state fruit of West Virginia.

1912 Smoking-cancer link

- Dr. Isaac Adler was the first to strongly suggest that lung cancer is related to smoking in 1912.

1914 Sinope

- Sinope is a retrograde irregular satellite of Jupiter discovered by Seth Barnes Nicholson at Lick Observatory in 1914.

1915 Zener diodes

- A Zener diode is a type of diode that permits current in the forward direction like a normal diode, but also in the reverse direction if the voltage is larger than the breakdown voltage known as "Zener knee voltage" or "Zener voltage". The device was named after Clarence Zener, who discovered this electrical property.

1916 Barnard's Star

- Barnard's Star is a very low-mass red dwarf star. At a distance of about 1.8 parsecs from the Solar System, or just under six light-years, Barnard's Star is the nearest-known star in the constellation Ophiuchus, and the fourth-closest known individual star to the Sun, after the three components of the Alpha Centauri system. In 1916, Barnard's Star was discovered by American astronomer Edward Emerson Barnard, whom the star was named after.

1916 Covalent bonding

- The idea of covalent bonding can be traced several years to Gilbert N. Lewis, who in 1916 described the sharing of electron pairs between atoms. He introduced the so-called Lewis notation or electron dot notation or The Lewis Dot Structure in which valence electrons are represented as dots around the atomic symbols.

1916 Heparin

- Heparin, a highly sulfated glycosaminoglycan, is widely used as an injectable anticoagulant and has the highest negative charge density of any known biological molecule. It can also be used to form an inner anticoagulant surface on various experimental and medical devices such as test tubes and renal dialysis machines. It was discovered by Jay McLean and William Henry Howell in 1916.

1917 Vitamin A

- Vitamin A, a bi-polar molecule formed with bi-polar covalent bonds between carbon and hydrogen, is linked to a family of similarly shaped molecules, the retinoids, which complete the remainder of the vitamin sequence. Its important part is the retinyl group, which can be found in several forms. In foods of animal origin, the major form of vitamin A is an ester, primarily retinyl palmitate, which is converted to an alcohol in the small intestine. Vitamin A can also exist as an aldehyde, or as an acid. The discovery of vitamin A stemmed from research dating back to 1906, indicating that factors other than carbohydrates, proteins, and fats were necessary to keep cattle healthy. By 1917 one of these substances was independently discovered by Elmer McCollum at the University of Wisconsin–Madison, and Lafayette Mendel and Thomas Osborne at Yale University.

1923 Oviraptor

- Oviraptor is a genus of small Mongolian theropod dinosaur that lived during the late Campanian stage about 75 million years ago. In 1923, Roy Chapman Andrews discovered the first and so far the only fossils of Oviraptor to ever be found at the Djadochta Formation in Inner Mongolia. This species of dinosaur was named and described by Henry Fairfield Osborn in 1924.

1924 Uncle Sam Diamond

- Uncle Sam is a 40.23-carat white diamond, the largest diamond ever found in North America. Discovered in 1924 at the Crater of Diamonds State Park in Arkansas, the diamond was named after its discoverer, Wesley Oley Basham, who went by the nickname "Uncle Sam". Over the years, the Uncle Sam diamond was cut twice with the second cutting resulting in a 12.42-carat, emerald-cut gem.

1925 Cepheid variables

- Extragalactic astronomy is the branch of astronomy concerned with objects outside the Milky Way Galaxy. In other words, it is the study of all astronomical objects which are not covered by galactic astronomy. It was started by Edwin Hubble when, in 1925, he discovered the existence of Cepheid variables in the Andromeda Galaxy. This discovery proved the existence of a galaxy over one million light-years away and thus extragalactic astronomy was created.

1927 Electron diffraction

- Electron diffraction is a collective scattering phenomenon with electrons being scattered by atoms in a regular crystal array. This can be understood in analogy to the Huygens principle for the diffraction of light. The incoming plane electron wave interacts with the atoms, and secondary waves are generated which interfere with each other. In 1927, two Americans named Clinton Davisson and Lester Germer had proven de Broglie's theory by discovering electron diffraction. This confirmation of the wavelike nature of an electron was discovered independently of Englishman George Paget Thomson.

1928 Jones Diamond

- The Jones Diamond is a bluish-white diamond weighing 34.48 carats (6.896 g), measuring 5/8 of an inch (15.8 mm) across, and possessing 12 diamond-shaped faces. It is considered to be the largest alluvial diamond from North America. The Jones Diamond was discovered by William P. "Punch" Jones and his father Grover while pitching horseshoes in 1928. They thought the stone was a piece of quartz which was common in the area. Keeping it in a cigar box in their tool shed for 14 years, the Jones's sent the gem to the geology department at Virginia Polytechnic Institute in 1942 where they were informed that it was an alluvial diamond and not a quartz crystal. The diamond was then sent to the Smithsonian Institution in Washington D.C. for safekeeping until 1964, when it returned to the Jones family who kept it for another 20 years in a safe deposit box at their local bank in Virginia. In 1984, the Jones family finally sold the diamond at Sotheby's auction in New York City to a private collector of jewelry.

1930 Pluto

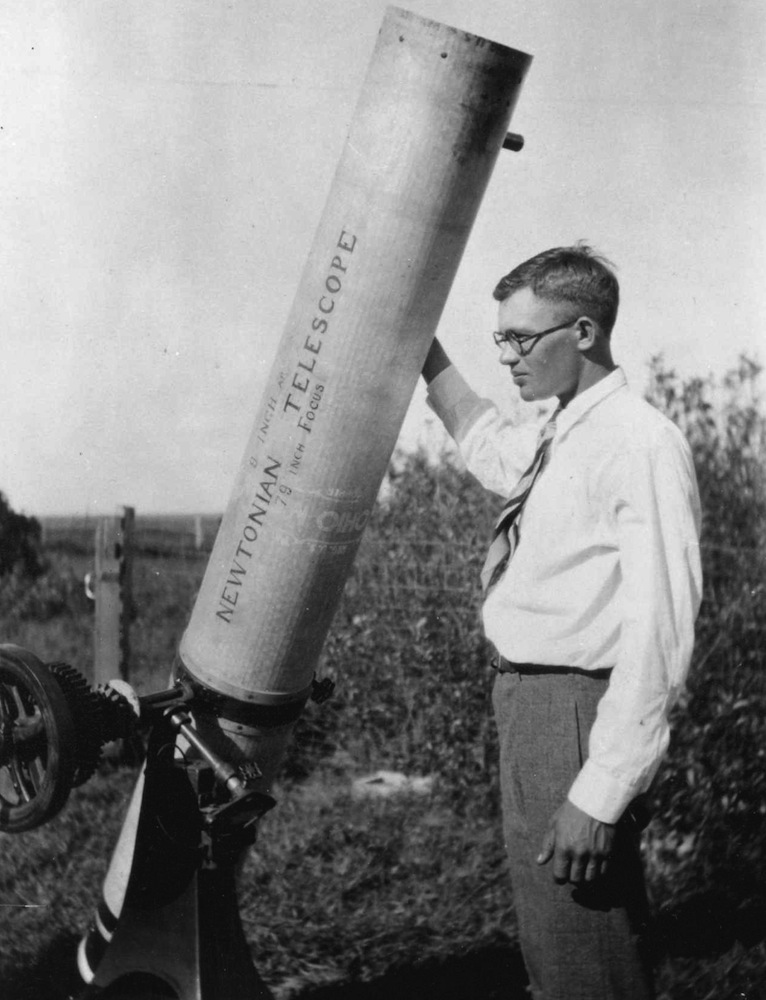
Clyde William Tombaugh, the American astronomer who discovered Pluto in 1930.

Following the discovery of the planet Neptune in 1846, there was considerable speculation that another planet might exist beyond its orbit. The search began in the mid-19th century but culminated at the start of the 20th century with a quest for Planet X. Percival Lowell proposed the Planet X hypothesis to explain apparent discrepancies in the orbits of the gas giants, particularly Uranus and Neptune, speculating that the gravity of a large unseen planet could have perturbed Uranus enough to account for the irregularities. The discovery of Pluto by Clyde Tombaugh in 1930 initially appeared to validate Lowell's hypothesis, and Pluto was considered the ninth planet until 2006.

1931 Heavy hydrogen

- Deuterium, also called heavy hydrogen, is a stable isotope of hydrogen with a natural abundance in the oceans of Earth of approximately one atom in 6500 of hydrogen (~154 PPM). It was discovered in 1931 by Harold Urey, who obtained a sample of hydrogen enriched in deuterium by distillation at low temperature and pressure.

1931 Cosmic radio waves

- Radio astronomy is a subfield of astronomy that studies celestial objects at radio frequencies. While trying to track down a source of electrical interference on telephone transmissions, Karl Guthe Jansky of Bell Telephone Laboratories discovered radio waves emanating from stars in outer space while investigating static that interfered with short wave transatlantic voice transmissions. Thus, the field of radio astronomy was born.

1932 Positrons

- The existence of positrons was first postulated in 1928 by Paul Dirac as a consequence of the Dirac equation and later discovered in 1932 by Carl D. Anderson, who gave the positron its name.

1932 Homeostasis

- Homeostasis is the property of a system, either open or closed, that regulates its internal environment so as to maintain a stable, constant condition. It was first proposed and coined by Walter Bradford Cannon, a former professor and chairman of the Department of Physiology at Harvard Medical School, and popularized it in his book The Wisdom of the Body.

1933 Heavy water

- Harold Urey discovered the isotope deuterium in 1931 and was later able to concentrate it in water. Urey's mentor Gilbert Newton Lewis isolated the first sample of pure heavy water by electrolysis in 1933.

1933 Polyvinylidene chloride

- Polyvinylidene chloride is a polymer derived from vinylidene chloride. Its use can be found in water-based coating, the production of household items and industrial products. Ralph Wiley, a Dow Chemical lab worker, accidentally discovered polyvinylidene chloride in 1933.

1936 Elliptical galaxies

- An elliptical galaxy is a galaxy having an approximately elliptical shape and a smooth, nearly featureless brightness profile. They range in shape from nearly spherical to highly flattened and in size from hundreds of millions to over one trillion stars. It was originally described by Edwin Hubble in his 1936 work "The Realm of the Nebulae"

1936 Muons

- The muon is an elementary particle similar to the electron, with negative electric charge and a spin of 1/2. It was discovered by Carl D. Anderson and Seth Henry Neddermeyer in 1936 while they studied cosmic radiation.

1936 Vitamin E

- Tocopherol, a class of chemical compounds of which many have vitamin E activity, describes a series of organic compounds consisting of various methylated phenols. During feeding experiments with rats Herbert McLean Evans concluded in 1922 that besides vitamins B and C, an unknown vitamin existed. Although every other nutrition was present, the rats were not fertile. This condition could be changed by additional feeding with wheat germ. It took several years until 1936 when the substance was isolated from wheat germ and the formula C_{29}H_{50}O_{2} was determined by Herbert McLean Evans and K.S. Bishop. The structure was determined shortly thereafter in 1938.

1936 Sodium thiopental

- Sodium thiopental, better known as Sodium Pentothal, thiopentone sodium, or trapanal, is a rapid-onset short-acting barbiturate. It was discovered in the early 1936 by Ernest H. Volwiler and Donalee L. Tabern while working for Abbott Laboratories.

1937 Niacin

- Niacin, also known as vitamin B_{3}, is a water-soluble vitamin which prevents the deficiency disease pellagra. Niacin was extracted from livers by Conrad Elvehjem who later discovered the active ingredient, then referred to as the "pellagra-preventing factor" and the "anti-blacktongue factor".

1937 Electron capture

- Electron capture is a decay mode for isotopes that will occur when there are too many protons in the nucleus of an atom and insufficient energy to emit a positron. However, it continues to be a viable decay mode for radioactive isotopes that can decay by positron emission. K-electron capture was discovered by Luis Alvarez, who demonstrated it in 1937 and reported it in The Physical Review in April 1938.

1938 Fluropolymers

- A fluoropolymer is a fluorocarbon based polymer with multiple strong carbon–fluorine bonds. It is characterized by a high resistance to solvents, acids, and bases. Fluoropolymers were discovered in 1938 by Dr. Roy Plunkett when he accidentally polymerized tetrafluoroethylene to form polytetrafluoroethylene.

1938 Animal echolocation

- Echolocation, also called biosonar, is the biological sonar used by several animals such as dolphins, shrews, bats, and whales. The term was coined by Donald Griffin and Robert Galambos, who discovered its use by bats in 1938.

1938 Carme

- Carme is a retrograde irregular satellite of Jupiter. It was discovered by Seth Barnes Nicholson at Mount Wilson Observatory in California in July 1938.

1938 Lysithea

- Lysithea is a prograde irregular satellite of Jupiter. It was discovered by Seth Barnes Nicholson in 1938 at Mount Wilson Observatory.

1940 Plutonium

- Plutonium is a synthetic transuranic radioactive chemical element with the chemical symbol Pu and atomic number 94. It is an actinide metal of silvery-white appearance that tarnishes when exposed to air, forming a dull coating when oxidized. Plutonium was co-discovered by Glenn T. Seaborg, A.C. Wahl, and J.W. Kennedy in 1940.

1942 Cyanoacrylate

- Cyanoacrylates are a class of fast-acting adhesives and glues. Better known under the brand name "Super Glue," cyanoacrylates are used to assemble prototype electronics (see Wire wrap), flying model aircraft, and as retention dressings for nuts and bolts. Their effectiveness in bonding metal and general versatility have also made them popular for use in simple woodworking, industrial binding, and appliance repair. The history of cyanoacrylates is one of accidental discovery when researchers under Dr. Harry Coover conducted experiments on adhesive chemicals in order to devise a clear plastic that could be used for precision gunsights for soldiers fighting in World War II. Failing in their experimentations, the practical usefulness of cyanoarcrylates did not materialize until much later when in 1951, Coover, who was then working at Eastman Kodak, came to the realization that the sticky adhesives had unique properties in that they required no heat or pressure to permanently bond two items together. In light of his invention of "Super Glue," Coover filed U.S. patent #2,768,109 on June 2, 1954, and it was issued to him on October 23, 1956.

1943 Streptomycin

- Streptomycin is an antibiotic drug, the first of a class of drugs called aminoglycosides to be discovered, and was the first antibiotic remedy for tuberculosis. Streptomycin cannot be given orally as it must be administered by regular intramuscular injection. In 1943, Albert Schatz discovered Streptomycin.

1944 Americium

- Americium is a synthetic element that has the symbol Am and atomic number 95. A radioactive metallic element, americium is an actinide that is used in commercial ionization chamber smoke detectors, as well as in neutron sources and industrial gauges. Americium was co-discovered by Glenn T. Seaborg, Ralph James, L. Morgan, and Albert Ghiorso during their work on the Manhattan Project in 1944.

1944 Curium

- Curium is a synthetic chemical element with the symbol Cm and atomic number 96. A radioactive metallic transuranic element of the actinide series, curium is produced by bombarding plutonium with alpha particles (helium ions) and was named after Marie Curie and her husband Pierre Curie. Curium was co-discovered by Glenn T. Seaborg, Ralph A. James, and Albert Ghiorso at the University of California at Berkeley in 1944.

1945 Promethium

- Promethium is a chemical element whose existence was first predicted by Bohuslav Brauner in 1902. It was first discovered and proven to exist at Oak Ridge National Laboratory (ORNL) in 1945 by Jacob A. Marinsky, Lawrence E. Glendenin, and Charles D. Coryell by separation and analysis of the fission products of uranium fuel irradiated in the Graphite Reactor.

1946 Cloud seeding

- Cloud seeding, a form of weather modification, is the attempt to change the amount or type of precipitation that falls from clouds, by dispersing substances into the air that serve as cloud condensation or ice nuclei, which alter the microphysical processes within the cloud. The usual intent is to increase precipitation but hail and fog suppression are also widely practiced in airports. The method's use has ranged from increasing precipitation in areas experiencing drought to removing radioactive particles from clouds. Cloud seeding was discovered by Vincent Schaefer in 1946.

1948 Warfarin

- Warfarin is an anticoagulant and pesticide. It was initially used as a pesticide but was later found to be effective and relatively safe for preventing thrombosis and embolism in many disorders and is currently the most widely used anticoagulant worldwide. It was discovered by Karl Paul Link and chemists at the University of Wisconsin–Madison.

1948 Miranda

- Miranda is the smallest and innermost of Uranus' five major moons. It was discovered by Gerard Kuiper on February 2, 1948, at McDonald Observatory.

1948 Serotonin

- Seratonin is a monoamine neurotransmitter synthesized in serotonergic neurons in the central nervous system (CNS) and enterochromaffin cells in the gastrointestinal tract of animals including humans. It was isolated and named in 1948 by Maurice M. Rapport, Arda Green, and Irvine Page of the Cleveland Clinic.

1948 Tetracycline

- Tetracycline is a broad-spectrum polyketide antibiotic indicated for use against many bacterial infections. It is commonly used to treat acne today, and played a historical role in stamping out cholera in the developed world. It was discovered by Benjamin Minge Duggar in 1948.

1949 Nereid

- Nereid, also known as Neptune II, is a moon of Neptune. Nereid was discovered on May 1, 1949, by Gerard Kuiper, who proposed the name in the report of his discovery. It is named after the Nereids, sea-nymphs of Greek mythology.

1949 Berkelium

- Berkelium is a synthetic element with the symbol Bk and atomic number 97. A radioactive metallic element in the actinide series, berkelium was first synthesized by bombarding americium with alpha particles (helium ions) and was named for the University of California at Berkeley. Berkelium was co-discovered in December 1949 by Glenn T. Seaborg, Stanley G. Thompson, and Albert Ghiorso.

1950 Californium

- Californium is a radioactive metallic chemical element with the symbol Cf and atomic number 98. The element was first produced by bombarding curium with alpha particles (helium ions) at the University of California, Berkeley. It was the sixth transuranic element to be synthesized. Californium is one of the highest atomic mass elements to have been produced in weighable amounts. It is named for the U.S. state of California and the University of California. Californium was co-discovered by Stanley G. Thompson, Albert Ghiorso, and Glenn T. Seaborg in 1950.

1951 Barium stars

- Barium stars are G to K class giants, whose spectra indicate an overabundance of s-process elements by the presence of singly ionized barium, Ba II, at λ 455.4 nm. Barium stars also show enhanced spectral features of carbon, the bands of the molecules CH, CN and C2. The class was originally recognized and defined by William Bidelman and Philip Keenan.

1951 Ananke

- Ananke is a retrograde irregular satellite of Jupiter. It was discovered by Seth Barnes Nicholson at Mount Wilson Observatory in 1951.

1952 Polio vaccine

- Vaccination works by priming the immune system with an 'immunogen'. Stimulating immune response, via use of an infectious agent, is known as immunization. The development of immunity to polio efficiently blocks person-to-person transmission of wild poliovirus, thereby protecting both individual vaccine recipients and the wider community. In 1952, Dr. Jonas Salk announced his discovery of a trial vaccine for Polio, or poliomyelitis. Salk's vaccine was composed of "killed" polio virus, which retained the ability to immunize without the risk of infecting the patient. In 1954, Salk published his findings in the Journal of the American Medical Association, and nationwide testing was carried out. In 1955, Salk's polio vaccine was made public.

1952 Einsteinium

- Einsteinium is a metallic synthetic element. On the periodic table, it is represented by the symbol Es and atomic number 99. It is the seventh transuranic element, and an actinide. It was named in honor of Albert Einstein. Einsteinium was discovered by Albert Ghioirso in December 1952.

1952 Rapid eye movement

- Rapid eye movement (REM) sleep is a normal stage of sleep characterized by rapid movements of the eyes. REM sleep is classified into two categories: tonic and phasic. The phenomenon of REM sleep and its association with dreaming was discovered by Eugene Aserinsky and Nathaniel Kleitman with assistance from William C. Dement, a medical student at the time, in 1952 during their tenures at the University of Chicago. Kleitman and Aserinsky's seminal article was published September 10, 1953.

1953 DNA structure

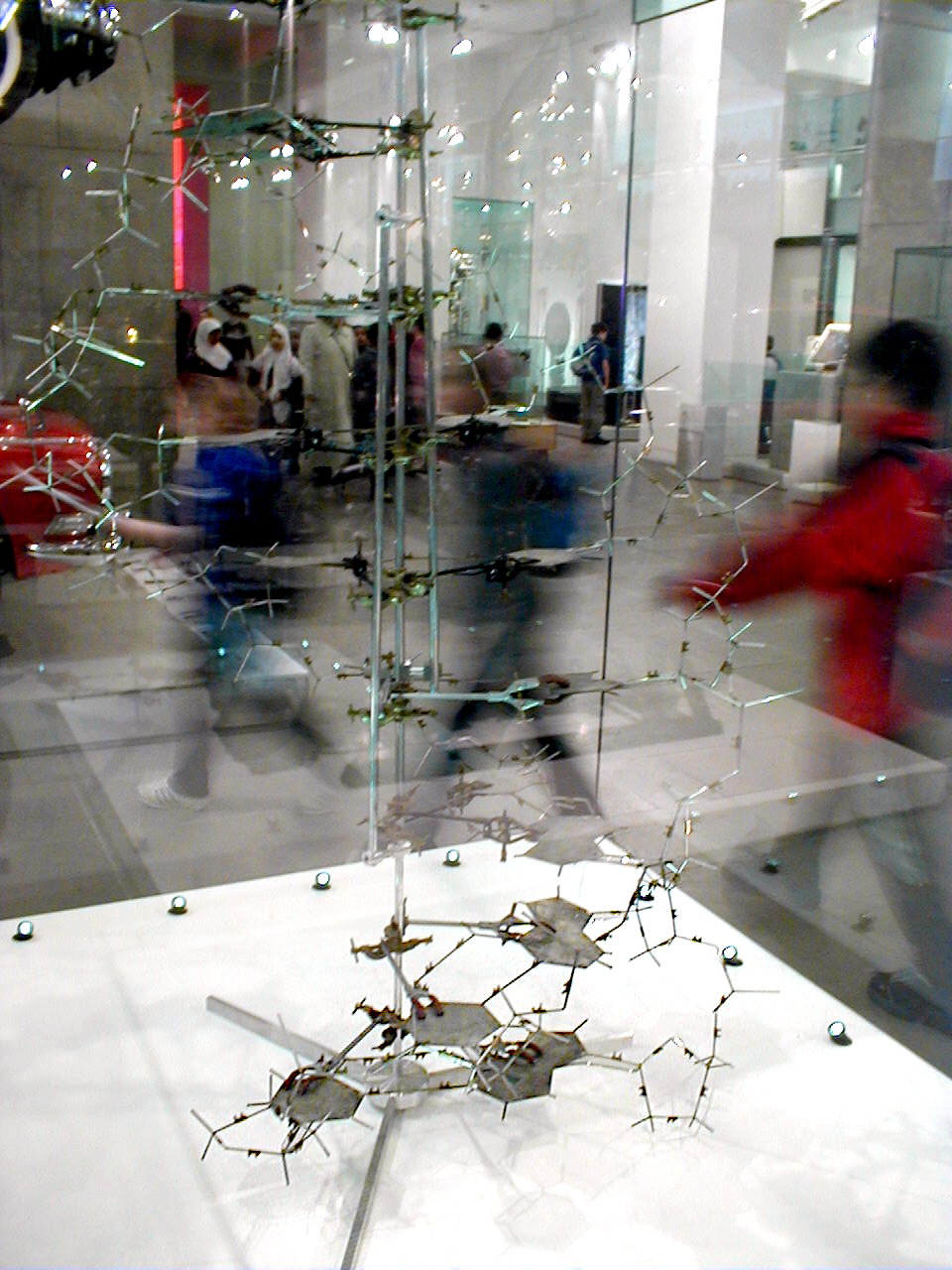
Watson-Crick DNA model of 1953, was reconstructed largely from its original pieces in 1973 and donated to the Science Museum in London.

In 1953, based on X-ray diffraction images and the information that the bases were paired, James D. Watson along with Francis Crick co-discovered what is now widely accepted as the first accurate double-helix model of DNA structure.

1955 Mendelevium

- Mendelevium is a synthetic element with the symbol Md (formerly Mv) and the atomic number 101. A metallic radioactive transuranic element of the actinides, mendelevium is usually synthesized by bombarding einsteinium with alpha particles and was named after the Russian chemist Dmitri Mendeleev, who was responsible for the Periodic Table. Mendelevium was co-discovered by Albert Ghiorso, Bernard G. Harvey, Gregory R. Choppin, Stanley G. Thompson, and Glenn T. Seaborg in 1955.

1955 Antiproton

- The antiproton is the antiparticle of the proton. It was discovered by University of California, Berkeley physicists Thomas Ypsilantis, Emilio Segrè, Clyde Wiegand, and Owen Chamberlain in 1955.

1956 Porous silicon

- Porous silicon (pSi) is a form of the chemical element silicon which has an introduced nanoporous holes in its microstructure, rendering a large surface to volume ratio in the order of 500m2/cm3. It was first discovered by accident in 1956 at Bell Labs by Arthur Uhlir Jr. and Ingeborg Uhlir.

1956 Kaon

- A kaon is any one of a group of four mesons distinguished by the fact that they carry a quantum number called strangeness. It was first discovered by Leon Lederman and a group of scientists from Columbia University at Brookhaven National Laboratory.

1956 Antineutron

- The antineutron is the antiparticle of the neutron. An antineutron has the same mass as a neutron, and no net electric charge. However, it is different from a neutron by being composed of anti-quarks, rather than quarks. It was discovered by Bruce Cork, William Wenzell, Glenn Lambertson, and Oreste Piccioni in 1956.

1956 Neutrino

- Neutrinos are elementary particles that travel close to the speed of light, lack an electric charge, are able to pass through ordinary matter almost undisturbed, and are thus extremely difficult to detect. The neutrino was first postulated in 1930 by Wolfgang Pauli and later discovered in 1956 by Clyde Cowan, Frederick Reines, F. B. Harrison, H. W. Kruse, and A. D. McGuire.

1956 Nucleic acid hybridization

- Hybridization, discovered by Alexander Rich and David R. Davies in 1956, is the process of combining complementary, single-stranded nucleic acids into a single molecule.

1958 Van Allen radiation belt

- The Van Allen radiation belt is a torus of energy charged particles around Earth, held in place by Earth's magnetic field. On the sun side, it is compressed because of the solar wind and on the other side, it is elongated to around three earth radii. This creates a cavity called the Chapman Ferraro Cavity, in which the Van Allen radiation belts reside. The existence of the belt was confirmed by the Explorer 1 and Explorer 3 missions in early 1958, under Dr. James Van Allen at the University of Iowa.

1959 Antiproton

- The antiproton is the antiparticle of the proton. It was discovered in 1955 by University of California, Berkeley physicists Owen Chamberlain and Emilio Segrè for which they earned the 1959 Nobel Prize in Physics.

1960 Seafloor spreading

- Seafloor spreading occurs at mid-ocean ridges, where new oceanic crust is formed through volcanic activity and then gradually moves away from the ridge. Seafloor spreading helps explain continental drift in the theory of plate tectonics. It was first proposed by Harry Hammond Hess and Robert S. Dietz in 1960.

1961 Eta meson

- The eta meson is a meson made of a mix of up quark, down quark, strange quark, quarks, and anti-quarks. It was discovered by a team at the University of California, Berkeley using the Bevatron.

1964 Xi baryon

- In particle physics, subatomic particle (Xi) is a name given to a range of baryons with one up or down quark and two heavier quarks. They are sometimes called the cascade particles because of their unstable state, they decay rapidly into lighter particles through a chain of decays. The first discovery of the Xi particle was at Brookhaven National Laboratory in 1964.

1964 Cosmic microwave background radiation

- In cosmology, the cosmic microwave background radiation CMB is a form of electromagnetic radiation filling the universe. The CMB's discovery in 1964 by astronomers Arno Penzias and Robert Wilson was the culmination of work initiated in the 1940s, earning them a Nobel Prize in 1978.

1964 Quark

- A quark is a type of elementary particle found in nucleons and other subatomic particles. They are a major constituent of matter, along with leptons. The quark model was first postulated independently by physicist Murray Gell-Mann in 1964.

1964 1930 Lucifer

- 1930 Lucifer was a main-belt asteroid discovered at the United States Naval Observatory Flagstaff Station (NOFS) in Flagstaff, Arizona on October 29, 1964, by American astronomer Elizabeth Roemer.

1964 Hepatitis B virus

- The Hepatitis B virus was discovered in 1965 by Baruch Blumberg, while working at the National Institutes of Health.

1965 Aspartame

- Aspartame is the name for an artificial, non-saccharide sweetener, aspartyl-phenylalanine-1-methyl ester; that is, a methyl ester of the dipeptide of the amino acidsaspartic acid and phenylalanine. Aspartame was discovered in 1965 by James M. Schlatter, a chemist working for G.D. Searle & Company. Schlatter had synthesized aspartame in the course of producing an anti-ulcer drug candidate.

1965 Pulsating white dwarfs

- A pulsating white dwarf is a white dwarf star whose luminosity varies due to non-radial gravity wave pulsations within itself. The first pulsating white dwarf was discovered by Arlo U. Landolt when he observed in 1965 and 1966 that the luminosity of HL Tau 76 varied with a period of approximately 12.5 minutes.

1968 Up quark

- The up quark is a first-generation quark with a charge of +(2/3)e. The existence of up quarks was first postulated when Murray Gell-Mann and George Zweig developed the quark model in 1964, and the first evidence for them was found in deep inelastic scattering experiments in 1968.

1968 Down quark

- The down quark is a first-generation quark with a charge of −1/3. It is the second-lightest of all the six of quarks, the lightest being the up quark. Down quarks are most commonly found in nucleons. Its protons contains one down quark and two up quarks, while neutrons contain two down quarks and one up quark. Down quarks were theorized by Murray Gell-Mann and George Zweig when they discovered the quark model in 1968.

1969 Mosher's acid

- Mosher's acid, or α-methoxytrifluorophenylacetic acid, discovered by Harry S. Mosher in 1969, is a carboxylic acid which was first used as a chiral derivitizing agent.

1969 Interstellar formaldehyde

- Interstellar formaldehyde was first discovered in 1969 by Lewis Snyder, David Buhl, B. Zuckerman and Patrick Palmer using the National Radio Astronomy Observatory. Formaldehyde was detected by means of the 111 - 110 ground state rotational transition at 4830 MHz.

1970 Reverse transcriptase

- In biochemistry, a reverse transcriptase, also known as RNA-dependent DNA polymerase, is a DNA polymerase enzyme that transcribes single-stranded RNA into double-stranded DNA. It was discovered by Howard Temin at the University of Wisconsin–Madison, and independently by David Baltimore in 1970 at Massachusetts Institute of Technology.

1972 Opiate receptors

- Opioid receptors are a group of G protein-coupled receptors with opioids as ligands. The endogenous opioids are dynorphins, enkephalins, endorphins, endomorphins, and nociceptin. The opioid receptors are ~40% identical to somatostatin receptors (SSTRs). Opiate receptors were discovered in 1972 by the American neuroscientist and pharmacologist named Candace Pert.

1974 Australopithecus "Lucy"

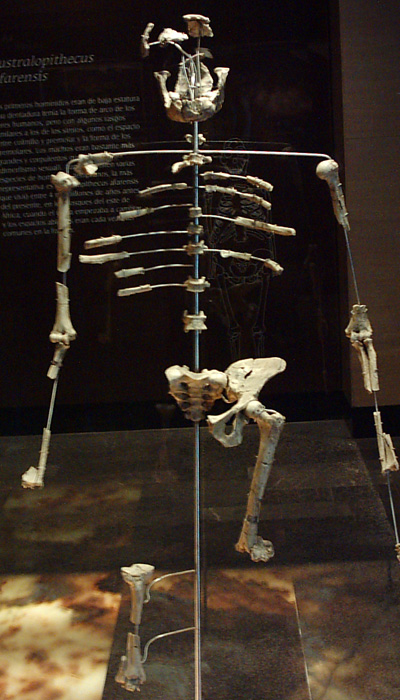
Full replica of Lucy's (Australopithecus afarensis) skeleton in the Museo Nacional de Antropología at Mexico City.

Lucy is the common name of AL 288–1, several hundred pieces of bone representing about 40% of the skeleton of an individual Australopithecus afarensis. Lucy is reckoned to have lived 3.2 million years ago. This hominid was significant as the skeleton shows evidence of small skull capacity akin to that of non-human apes and of bipedal upright walk akin to that of humans, providing further evidence that bipedalism preceded increase in brain size in human evolution. While working in collaboration with a joint French-British-American team, Lucy was discovered in Hadar, Ethiopia on November 24, 1974, when American paleoanthropologist Donald Johanson, coaxed away from his paperwork by graduate student Tom Gray for a spur-of-the-moment survey, caught the glint of a white fossilized bone out of the corner of his eye, and recognized it as hominid. Later described as the first known member of Australopithecus afarensis. Dr. Johanson's girlfriend suggested she be named "Lucy" after the Beatles' song "Lucy in the Sky with Diamonds" which was played repeatedly during the night of the discovery.

1974 J/ψ mesons

- The J/ψ is a subatomic particle, a flavor-neutral meson consisting of a charm quark and a charm anti-quark. Mesons formed by a bound state of a charm quark and a charm anti-quark are generally known as "charmonium". Its discovery was made independently by two research groups, one at the Stanford Linear Accelerator Center, headed by Burton Richter, and one at the Brookhaven National Laboratory, headed by Samuel Ting at Massachusetts Institute of Technology. They accidentally discovered they had found the same particle, and both announced their discoveries on November 11, 1974.

1974 Charm quark

- The charm quark is a second-generation quark with an electric charge of +2/3 e. It is the third most massive of the quarks, at about 1.5 GeV/c2 and roughly one and a half times the mass of the proton. It was predicted in 1964 by Sheldon Glashow and James Bjorken and first observed in November 1974, with the simultaneous discovery of the J/ψ|J/ψ meson charm particle at Stanford Linear Accererator Center by a group led by Burton Richter and at Brookhaven National Laboratory by a group led by Samuel C. C. Ting.

1974 Binary pulsars

- A binary pulsar is a pulsar with a binary companion, often another pulsar, white dwarf or neutron star. The first binary pulsar, PSR 1913+16 or the "Hulse-Taylor binary pulsar" was discovered in 1974 at Arecibo by Joseph Hooton Taylor, Jr. and Russell Hulse, for which they won the 1993 Nobel Prize in Physics.

1974 Leda

- Leda is a prograde irregular satellite of Jupiter. It was discovered by Charles T. Kowal at the Palomar Observatory on September 14, 1974.

1974 Seaborgium

- Seaborgium is a chemical element with the symbol Sg and atomic number 106. Seaborgium is a synthetic element whose most stable isotope 271Sg has a half-life of 1.9 minutes. Chemistry experiments with seaborgium have firmly placed it in group 6 as a heavier homologue to tungsten. Seaborgium was independently discovered by groups at the Joint Institute for Nuclear Research and Lawrence Berkeley National Laboratory in 1974, and was named in honor of the American chemist Glenn T. Seaborg.

1975 1983 Bok

- 1983 Bok is a minor planet discovered on June 9, 1975, by American astronomer Elizabeth Roemer at Kitt Peak National Observatory in Arizona. As a minor planet, 1983 Bok was named in honor of Bart J. and Priscilla Fairfield Bok.

1975 Themisto

- Themisto is a small prograde irregular satellite of Jupiter. It was discovered by Charles T. Kowal and Elizabeth Roemer in 1975.

1975 Amarillo Starlight

- The Amarillo Starlight is a 16.37-carat white diamond that was discovered in 1975 by W. W. Johnson of Amarillo, Texas while vacationing at the Crater of Diamonds State Park in Arkansas. The Amarillo Starlight was later cut into a 7.54-carat marquise shape.

1976 D mesons

- D mesons are the lightest particle containing charm quarks. They are often studied to gain knowledge on the weak interaction. Since the D meson is the lightest meson containing a charm quark, it must change the charm quark into another quark to decay. D mesons were discovered in 1976 during the Mark I experiments at the Stanford Linear Accelerator Center.

1976 Hepatitis B virus vaccine

- After Baruch Samuel Blumberg discovered the Hepatitis B virus in 1964, he later developed a diagnostic test and vaccine for the Hepatitis B virus in 1976.

1977 Tau lepton

- The tau lepton is a negatively charged elementary particle with a lifetime of 2.9×10−13 s and a mass of 1,777 MeV/c2. It was detected in a series of experiments between 1974 and 1977 by Martin Lewis Perl with his colleagues at the Lawrence Berkeley National Laboratory.

1977 Rings of Uranus

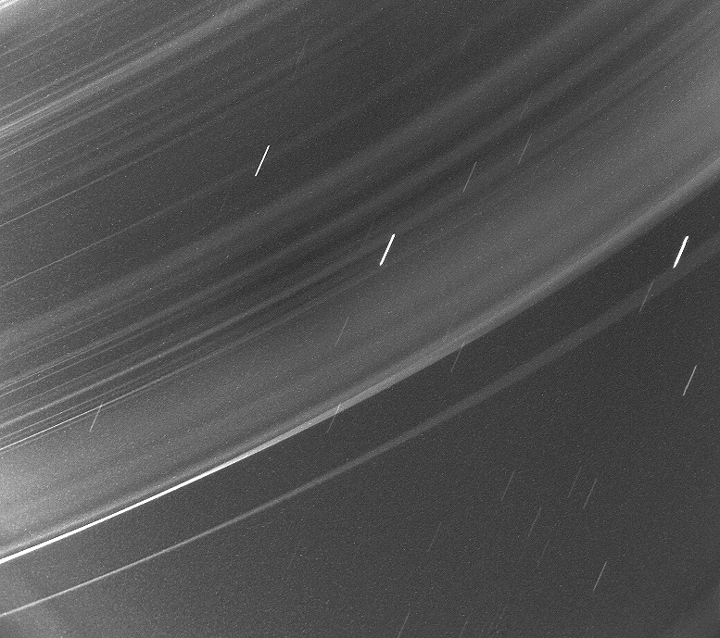
A long-exposure, high phase angle (172.5°) Voyager 2 image of Uranus' inner rings. In forward-scattered light, dust bands not visible in other images can be seen, as well as the recognized rings.

The planet Uranus has a system of rings intermediate in complexity between the more extensive set around Saturn and the simpler systems around Jupiter and Neptune. The rings of Uranus were discovered on March 10, 1977, by James L. Elliot, Edward W. Dunham, and Douglas J. Mink. More than 200 years ago, William Herschel also reported observing rings, but modern astronomers are skeptical that he could actually have noticed them, as they are very dark and faint.

1977 Upsilon mesons

- The upsilon meson is a flavorless meson formed from a bottom quark and its antiparticle. It was discovered by the E288 collaboration, headed by Leon Lederman, at Fermilab in 1977, and was the first particle containing a bottom quark to be discovered because it is the lightest that can be produced without additional massive particles. It has a mean lifetime of 1.21×10^{−20} second and a mass about 10 GeV.

1977 Bottom quark

- The bottom quark is a third-generation quark with a charge of −1/3e. The bottom quark was discovered by the E288 experiment at Fermilab in 1977 when collisions produced bottomonium.

1978 Restriction endonucleases

- A restriction enzyme is an enzyme that cuts double-stranded or single stranded DNA at specific recognition nucleotide sequences known as restriction sites. Such enzymes, found in bacteria and archaea, are thought to have evolved to provide a defense mechanism against invading viruses. Inside a bacterial host, the restriction enzymes selectively cut up foreign DNA in a process called restriction; host DNA is methylated by a modification enzyme to protect it from the restriction enzyme's activity. The Nobel Prize in Medicine was awarded, in 1978, to Daniel Nathans, Werner Arber, and Hamilton O. Smith for the discovery of restriction endonucleases.

1978 Charon

- Charon, discovered by James W. Christy on June 22, 1978, while working at the United States Naval Observatory, is the largest moon of the dwarf planet Pluto.

1979 Metis

- Metis is the innermost moon of Jupiter. It was discovered in 1979 by Stephen Synnott in images taken by Voyager 1.

1979 Thebe

- Thebe is the fourth of Jupiter's moons by distance from the planet. It was discovered by Stephen Synnott in images from the Voyager 1 space probe taken on March 5, 1979, while orbiting around Jupiter.

1979 Rings of Jupiter

- The planet Jupiter has a system of rings, known as the rings of Jupiter or the Jovian ring system. It was the third ring system to be discovered in the Solar System, after those of Saturn and Uranus and was first observed in 1979 by the Voyager 1 space probe.

1980 Oncogene

- An oncogene is a gene that is mutated or expressed at high levels, and thus helps turn a normal cell into a tumor cell. In the late 1970s, Robert Weinberg and his team of researchers began the search for a human oncogene. Using gene transfer techniques, researchers in his lab inserted DNA from human bladder tumor cells into normal animal cells. When the animal cells turned cancerous, Dr. Weinberg's associates began inserting smaller pieces of DNA into the normal cell. By 1980, they found a single fragment that turned the normal cell cancerous. This gene was found to belong to a sub-family of related genes, called ras, that was later discovered to play a role in causing bladder, lung, and colon cancer in both rats and humans. More results emerged in 1982 when Dr. Weinberg's laboratory discovered that a single, subtle genetic glitch in this oncogene topples the delicate balance between a bladder cell's normal and cancerous states.

1980 Pandora

- Pandora is an inner satellite of Saturn. It was discovered in 1980 from photos taken by Voyager 1, and was provisionally designated S/1980 S 26.

1980 Prometheus

- Prometheus is an inner satellite of Saturn that was discovered in 1980 from photos taken by Voyager 1. It was provisionally designated S/1980 S 27.

1980 Atlas

- Atlas is a moon of Saturn that was discovered by Richard Terrile in 1980 from Voyager photos and was designated S/1980 S 28.

1981 Larissa

- Larissa, also known as Neptune VII, is the fifth-closest inner satellite of Neptune. It was first discovered by Harold J. Reitsema, William B. Hubbard, Larry A. Lebofsky, and David J. Tholen based on fortuitous ground-based stellar occultation observations on May 24, 1981, and given the temporary designation S/1981 N 1, being announced on May 29, 1981.

1983 Pneumococcal polysaccharide vaccine

- Pneumococcal polysaccharide vaccine, also known as Pneumovax, is a vaccine used to prevent Streptococcus pneumoniae infections such as pneumonia and septicaemia. It was discovered by American scientists at Merck & Co. in 1983.

1984 Whydah wreckage

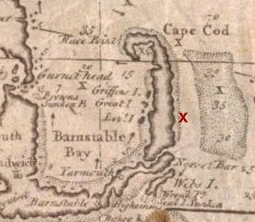
Location of Whydah Gally which sank in 1717, near Cape Cod. The red X marks the spot.

First launched in 1715 from London, England, the Whydah was a three-masted ship of galley-style design measuring 105 feet (32 m) in length, rated at 300 tons burden, and could travel at speeds up to 14.95 mph (24.06 km/h). Christened Whydah after the West African slave trading kingdom of Ouidah, the vessel was configured as a heavily armed trading and transport ship for use in the Atlantic slave trade, carrying goods from England to exchange for slaves in West Africa. It would then travel to the Caribbean to trade the slaves for precious metals, sugar, indigo, and medicinal ingredients, which would then be transported back to England. Captained by the English pirate Samuel Bellamy, the Whydah, on April 26, 1717, sailed into a violent storm dangerously close to Cape Cod and was eventually driven onto the shoals at Wellfleet, Massachusetts. At midnight she hit a sandbar in 16 feet (4.9 m) of water some 500 feet (150 m) from the coast of what is now Marconi Beach. Pummelled by 70-mile (110 km)-an-hour winds and 30 to 40-foot (12 m) waves, the main mast snapped, pulling the ship into some 30 feet (9.1 m) of water where she violently capsized, taking Bellamy, all but two of his 145 men, and over 4.5 tons of gold, silver and jewels with it. After years of exhaustive searching, it was in 1984 that world headlines were made when American archeological explorer Barry Clifford found the only solidly-identified pirate shipwreck ever discovered, the Whydah. Two-hundred thousand artifacts and sunken treasures were discovered in the shipwreck as well.

1985 Puck

- Puck is an inner satellite of Uranus. It was discovered in December 1985 by the Voyager 2 spacecraft.

1985 RMS Titanic wreckage

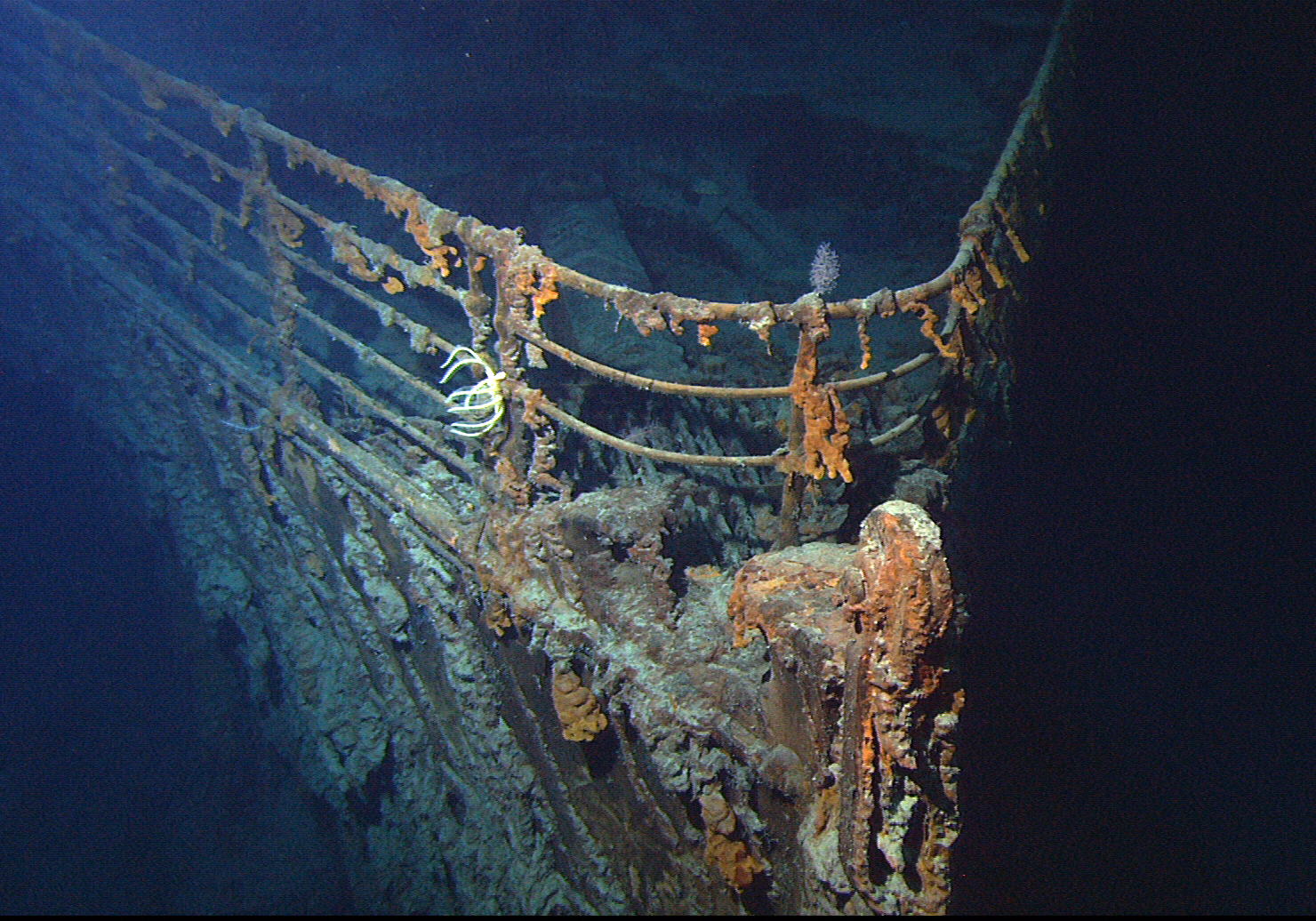
The bow of the wrecked RMS Titanic, photographed in June 2004

The RMS Titanic was an Olympic class passenger liner owned by the White Star Line and was built at the Harland and Wolff shipyard in Belfast, in what is now Northern Ireland. At the time of her construction, she was the largest passenger steamship in the world. Shortly before midnight on April 14, 1912, four days into the ship's maiden voyage, Titanic struck an iceberg and sank two hours and forty minutes later, early on April 15, 1912. The sinking resulted in the deaths of 1,517 of the 2,223 people on board, making it one of the deadliest peacetime maritime disasters in history. After nearly 74 years of being lost at sea on the bottom of the ocean floor, a joint Franco-American expedition led by American oceanographer Dr. Robert D. Ballard, discovered the wreckage of the RMS Titanic two miles (3.2 km) beneath the waves of the North Atlantic on September 1, 1985. Ballard was then forced to wait a year for weather conditions favorable to a crewed mission to view the wreck at close range. In 1986, Ballard and his two-man crew, in the ALVIN submersible, made the first two-and-a-half-hour descent to the ocean floor to view the wreck first-hand. Over the next few days, they descended again and again and, using the Jason Jr. remote camera, recorded the first scenes of the ruined interior of the luxury liner.

1986 Portia

- Portia is an inner satellite of Uranus. It was discovered from the images taken by Voyager 2 on January 3, 1986, and was given the temporary designation S/1986 U 1.

1986 Juliet

- Juliet is an inner satellite of Uranus. It was discovered from the images taken by Voyager 2 on January 3, 1986, and was given the temporary designation S/1986 U 2.

1986 Cressida

- Cressida is an inner satellite of Uranus. It was discovered from the images taken by Voyager 2 on January 9, 1986, and was given the temporary designation S/1986 U 3.

1986 Rosalind

- Rosalind is an inner satellite of Uranus. It was discovered from the images taken by Voyager 2 on January 13, 1986, and was given the temporary designation S/1986 U 4.

1986 Belinda

- Belinda is an inner satellite of Uranus. It was discovered from the images taken by Voyager 2 on January 13, 1986, and was given the temporary designation S/1986 U 5.

1986 Desdemona

- Desdemona is an inner satellite of Uranus. It was discovered from the images taken by Voyager 2 on January 13, 1986, and was given the temporary designation S/1986 U 6.

1986 Cordelia

- Cordelia is the inner satellite of Uranus. It was discovered from the images taken by Voyager 2 on January 20, 1986, and was given the temporary designation S/1986 U 7.

1986 Ophelia

- Ophelia is an inner satellite of Uranus. It was discovered from the images taken by Voyager 2 on January 20, 1986, and was given the temporary designation S/1986 U 8.

1986 Bianca

- Bianca is an inner satellite of Uranus. It was discovered from the images taken by Voyager 2 on January 23, 1986, and was given the temporary designation S/1986 U 9.

1986 Tumor suppressor gene

- A tumor suppressor gene, or anti-oncogene, is a gene that protects a cell from one step on the path to cancer. When this gene is mutated to cause a loss or reduction in its function, the cell can progress to cancer, usually in combination with other genetic changes. In 1986, Robert Weinberg and a team of researchers working under his direction made a seminal discovery when they isolated Rb, or the retinoblastoma protein, the first known growth-suppressor gene.

1989 Rings of Neptune

- The rings of Neptune were discovered in 1989 by the Voyager 2 spacecraft.

1989 Proteus

- Proteus, also known as Neptune VIII, is Neptune's largest inner satellite. Proteus was discovered from the images taken by Voyager 2 during the Neptune flyby in 1989.

1989 Despina

- Despina, also known as Neptune V, is the third-closest inner satellite of Neptune. Despina was discovered in late July 1989 from the images taken by the Voyager 2. It was given the temporary designation S/1989 N 3.

1989 Galatea

- Galatea, also known as Neptune VI, is the fourth-closest inner satellite of Neptune. Galatea was discovered in late July 1989 from the images taken by the Voyager 2. It was given the temporary designation S/1989 N 4.

1989 Thalassa

- Thalassa, also known as Neptune IV, is the second inner satellite of Neptune. It was discovered sometime before mid-September 1989 from the images taken by the Voyager 2. It was given the temporary designation S/1989 N 5.

1989 Naiad

- Naiad, also known as Neptune III, is the inner satellite of Neptune. It was discovered sometime before mid-September 1989 from the images taken by the Voyager 2. The last moon to be discovered during the flyby, it was designated S/1989 N 6.

1989 Bismarck wreckage

- The German battleship Bismarck was one of the most famous warships of World War II. As the lead ship of the Bismarck class, and named after the 19th century German Chancellor Otto von Bismarck, Bismarck displaced more than 50,000 tonnes fully loaded and was the largest warship then commissioned. Fleet Air Arm Swordfish biplanes launched from the carrier HMS Ark Royal torpedoed the ship and jammed her rudder, allowing Royal Navy units to catch up with her. In the ensuing battle on the morning of May 27, 1941, Bismarck was heavily attacked for almost two hours before sinking. After the discovery of the wreckage of the RMS Titanic in 1985, Dr. Robert D. Ballard's next goal was to find and film the wreck of the Bismarck. The search for the wreck began in July 1988, but his first expedition brought no success. A second expedition was mounted in late May 1989, and on June 8, 1989, after combing an area of some 200 square miles (520 km^{2}), Ballard and his team finally found Bismarck's remains. The wreck lies in the bottom of the Atlantic Ocean some 600 miles (970 km) west of Brest, France at a depth of 4,790 meters (15,720 feet).

1990 Strawn-Wagner Diamond

The Strawn-Wagner Diamond is a rare 3.03 carat diamond that is certified by the American Gem Society (AGS) as the world's most perfect diamond in terms of its cut and the highest grade possible, the "Triple Zero". The Strawn-Wagner Diamond was discovered in 1990 at the Crater of Diamonds State Park by Shirley Strawn of Murfreesboro, Arkansas.

1993 Comet Shoemaker-Levy 9

- Comet Shoemaker-Levy 9 was a comet that broke apart and collided with Jupiter in July 1994, providing the first direct observation of an extraterrestrial collision of solar system objects. The collision provided new information about Jupiter and highlighted its role in reducing space debris in the inner solar system. Comet Shoemaker-Levy 9 was co-discovered photographically by the husband and wife scientific team of Carolyn S. Shoemaker and Eugene M. Shoemaker along with Canadian-born astronomer David H. Levy on March 24, 1993, using the 0.46-m (18-in.) Schmidt telescope at Palomar Observatory in California. Its discovery was a serendipitous product of their continuing search for "near-Earth objects", and the "9" indicates that it was the ninth short-period comet (period less than 200 years) discovered by this team.

1995 Top quark

- The top quark is the third-generation up-type quark with a charge of +(2/3)e. It was discovered in 1995 by the CDF and D0 experiments at Fermilab and is the most massive of known elementary particles.

1995 Comet Hale-Bopp

- Comet Hale-Bopp was arguably the most widely observed comet of the 20th century, and one of the brightest seen for many decades and it was visible to the naked eye for a record 18 months when it passed near planet Earth. Hale-Bopp was discovered by Alan Hale and Thomas Bopp on July 23, 1995, at a great distance from the Sun, raising expectations that the comet would brighten considerably by the time it passed close to Earth. Although predicting the brightness of comets with any degree of accuracy is very difficult, Hale-Bopp met or exceeded most predictions when it passed perihelion on April 1, 1997.

1998 USS Yorktown (CV-5) wreckage

- The third USS Yorktown in the United States Navy, lead ship of the Yorktown class of aircraft carriers, was laid down on May 21, 1934, at Newport News, Virginia, by the Newport News Shipbuilding and Drydock Company. Yorktown was launched on April 4, 1936, sponsored by First Lady Eleanor Roosevelt, and commissioned at Norfolk, Virginia, on September 30, 1937, with Captain Ernest D. McWhorter in command. Yorktown was hit by air-launched torpedoes during the Battle of Midway on June 6, 1942. Hiryū, the sole surviving Japanese aircraft carrier, wasted little time in counter-attacking. The first wave of Japanese dive bombers badly damaged Yorktown with three bomb hits that snuffed out her boilers, immobilizing her, yet her damage control teams patched her up so effectively that the second wave's torpedo bombers mistook her for an undamaged carrier. Despite Japanese hopes to even the odds by eliminating two carriers with two strikes, Yorktown absorbed both Japanese attacks, the second wave mistakenly believing Yorktown had already been sunk and they were attacking USS Enterprise. After two torpedo hits, Yorktown lost power and developed a 26° list to port, which put her out of action and forced Admiral Frank J. Fletcher to move his command staff to the heavy cruiser Astoria. The second attempt at salvage, however, would never be made. Throughout the night of June 6 and into the morning of June 7, Yorktown remained stubbornly afloat. By 0530 on June 7, however, the men in the ships nearby noted that the carrier's list was rapidly increasing to port. At 0701, the ship turned over on her port side and sank in 3,000 fathoms (5,500 m) of water, her battle flags still flying. On May 19, 1998, the wreck of the Yorktown was discovered by Dr. Robert D. Ballard, American oceanographer and discoverer of the wreck of the RMS Titanic. The wreck of the Yorktown was found 3 miles (4.8 km) beneath the surface and was photographed.

1998 Embryonic stem cell lines

- A breakthrough in human embryonic stem cell research came in November 1998 when a group led by Dr. James Thomson at the University of Wisconsin–Madison first discovered a technique in order to isolate and grow cells which derived from human blastocysts, could one day lead to major medical advancements in organ transplantation as well as gene therapy and treatment of maladies such as paralysis, diabetes, cancer, and AIDS.

== Twenty-first century ==
2001 Interstellar vinyl alcohol

- Between May and June 2001, astronomers A. J. Apponi and Barry Turner co-discovered vinyl alcohol in the molecular cloud Sagittarius B using the National Science Foundation's 12-meter radio telescope at the Kitt Peak National Observatory.

2003 Sedna

- 90377 Sedna is a trans-Neptunian object and a likely dwarf planet. For most of its orbit Sedna is farther from the Sun than any other known dwarf planet candidate. In 2003, Sedna was co-discovered by Michael E. Brown, Chad Trujillo, and David Rabinowitz using the Samuel Oschin Telescope at Palomar Observatory.

2003 Psamathe

- Psamathe, also known as Neptune X, is a retrograde irregular satellite of Neptune. Psamathe was co-discovered by Scott S. Sheppard and David C. Jewitt in 2003.

2003 Mab

- Mab is an inner satellite of Uranus. It was co-discovered by Mark R. Showalter and Jack J. Lissauer in 2003 using the Hubble Space Telescope.

2003 Perdita

- Perdita is an inner satellite of Uranus. Perdita's discovery was complicated. The first photographs of Perdita were taken by the Voyager 2 spacecraft in 1986, but it was not recognized from the photographs for more than a decade. In 1999, the moon was noticed by Erich Karkoschka and reported. Because no further pictures could be taken to confirm its existence, it was officially demoted in 2001. However, in 2003, pictures taken by the Hubble Space Telescope managed to pick up an object where Perdita was supposed to be, finally confirming its existence.

2003 Cupid

- Cupid is an inner satellite of Uranus. It was co-discovered by Mark R. Showalter and Jack J. Lissauer in 2003 using the Hubble Space Telescope.

2004 Orcus

- 90482 Orcus is a large Kuiper Belt object (KBO) with a large companion and is likely a dwarf planet. Orcus was co-discovered by Chad Trujillo, Michael E. Brown, and David Rabinowitz in 2004.

2005 Makemake

- Makemake, formally designated (136472) Makemake, is the third-largest known dwarf planet in the Solar System and one of the two largest Kuiper belt objects (KBO). Its diameter is roughly three-quarters that of Pluto. Makemake has no known satellites, which makes it unique among the largest KBOs. Makemake was first co-discovered in March 2005 by American astronomers Michael E. Brown, Chad Trujillo, and David Rabinowitz at the Palomar Observatory.

2005 Eris

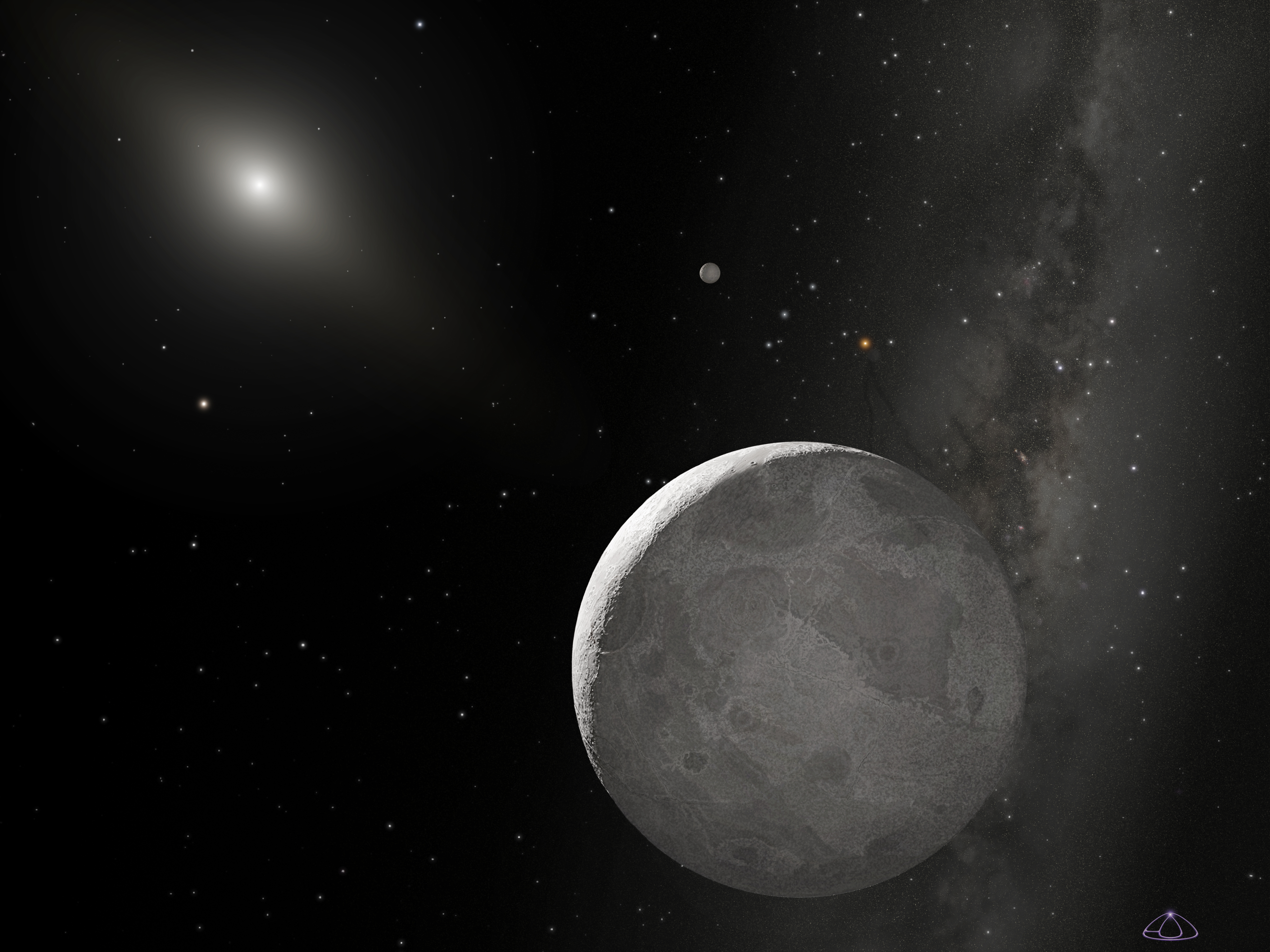
Artist impression of Eris and Dysnomia. Eris is the main object, Dysnomia the small grey disk just above it. The flaring object top-left is the Sun.

Eris, formal designation 136199 Eris, is the largest-known dwarf planet in the Solar System and the ninth-largest body known to orbit the Sun directly. It is approximately 2,500 kilometres in diameter and 27% more massive than the dwarf planet Pluto. Eris was discovered in 2005 at W. M. Keck Observatory by American astronomer Michael E. Brown.

2005 Dysnomia

Dysnomia, officially (136199) Eris I Dysnomia, is the only known moon of the dwarf planet Eris. In conjunction of finding Eris, American astronomer Michael E. Brown discovered Eris' satellite, Dysnomia, at W. M. Keck Observatory in 2005.

2005 Hydra

Hydra is the outer-most natural satellite of Pluto. It was discovered along with Nix in June 2005 by the Hubble Space Telescope's Pluto Companion Search Team, which is composed of Hal A. Weaver, Alan Stern, Max J. Mutchler, Andrew J. Steffl, Marc W. Buie, William J. Merline, John R. Spencer, Eliot F. Young, and Leslie A. Young.

2005 Nix

Nix is a natural satellite of Pluto. It was discovered along with Hydra in June 2005 by the Hubble Space Telescope's Pluto Companion Search Team, composed of Hal A. Weaver, Alan Stern, Max J. Mutchler, Andrew J. Steffl, Marc W. Buie, William J. Merline, John R. Spencer, Eliot F. Young, and Leslie A. Young.

2005 KV63 at the Valley of the Kings

- KV63 is the most recently opened chamber in Egypt's Valley of the Kings pharaonic necropolis. Initially believed to be a royal tomb, it is now believed to have been an ancient storage chamber for the mummification process. The 2005 discovery of KV63, located about 50 feet (15 m) away from King Tut's tomb, is credited to American Egyptologist Dr. Otto Schaden and his team from the University of Memphis.

2007 Human genome and variation mapping

- The human genome is the genome of Homo sapiens, which is stored on 23 chromosome pairs. Whereas a genome sequence lists the order of every DNA base in a genome, a genome map identifies the landmarks. A genome map is less detailed than a genome sequence and aids in navigating around the genome. While working at the National Institute of Health, Craig Venter discovered a technique for rapidly identifying all of the mRNAs present in a cell, and began to use it to identify human brain genes. The short cDNA sequence fragments discovered by this method are called expressed sequence tags. Through his scientific research of bringing the world one step closer to personalized medicine, Craig Venter was listed on Time Magazine's 2007 and 2008 Time 100 list of the most influential people in the world.

2007 Di-positronium

- The di-positronium is a molecule consisting of two atoms of positronium. It was predicted to exist in 1946 by John Archibald Wheeler and subsequently studied theoretically, but was not observed until 2007 in an experiment done by David Cassidy and Allen Mills at the University of California, Riverside.

== See also ==
- Bone Wars
- Discovery of Pluto
- George Washington Carver Peanut Discoveries
- History of United States patent law
- List of African-American inventors and scientists
- List of asteroids discovered by Carolyn Shoemaker
- Lemelson–MIT Prize
- NASA spin-off
- National Geographic Society
- National Inventors Hall of Fame
- Native American contributions
- Science and technology in the United States
- Smithsonian Institution
- Technological and industrial history of the United States
- Timeline of United States inventions
- United States Patent and Trademark Office
- United States patent law
- Yankee ingenuity
