= Kelsey Lake Diamond Mine =

Diamond mine in Colorado, US, 1996–2001

- Location in Colorado
- Location: Larimer County, Colorado, 25 miles south of Laramie, Wyoming,Colorado,United States; 40°59′38″N 105°30′18″W
- Products: Diamonds
- Opened: 1996; 30 years ago
- Closed: 2001; 25 years ago

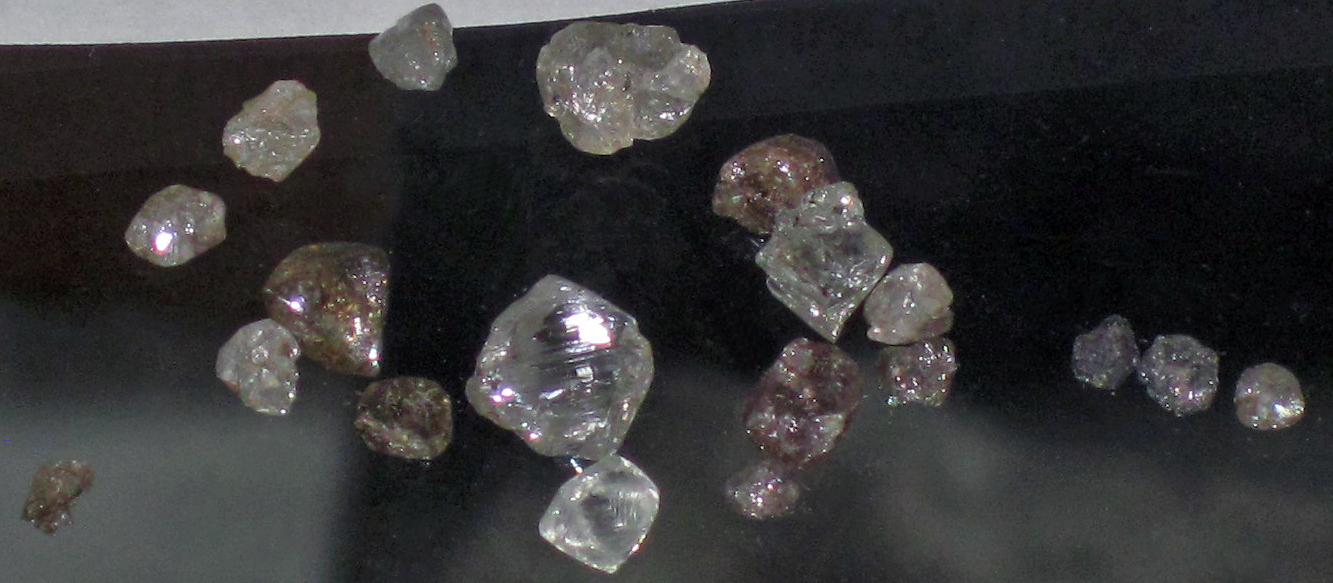
Diamonds from a prospect in the State Line Kimberlite Field, Colorado-Wyoming

Kelsey Lake Diamond Mine is a defunct diamond mine in the U.S. state of Colorado. It is located in the State Line Kimberlite District, near the Wyoming border, and consists of nine kimberlite volcanic pipes, of which two were open-pit mined.

At the time it was operating, it was the United States' only modern diamond mine, and only the second commercial diamond mining operation in North America, the first being in the Crater of Diamonds State Park, Arkansas which was mined in the early 1900s.

== History ==
Ever since diamonds had first been found in the State Line Kimberlite District in 1976, interest had been high in locating a viable commercial mining operation. Geologist Howard Coopersmith headed the Diamond Company L.N. which explored the feasibility of mining diamonds at the Kelsey Lake site. In 1995 Australian firm Redaurum acquired controlling interest in Diamond Co. and proceeded to lease mining rights for the land around Kelsey Lake . Commercial output started in May 1996. After mining and selling approximately 200 carats worth of diamonds, Redaurum was sued by Union Pacific who had originally sold the land in 1896 but claimed that it held on to the mineral rights. The two parties settled the lawsuit but in September 1997 Redaurum decided to liquidate its diamond properties to concentrate on exploration.

The mine was operated sporadically until the operation was acquired by McKenzie Bay International Ltd. in 2000. McKenzie bought the mine management firm Diamond Co. from Chapter 11 bankruptcy, transferred all its assets to a subsidiary, Great Western Diamond Co., and invested $2 million in new equipment for the mine. In 2001, McKenzie tried to sell the mine to focus on mining vanadium after the price of that metal rose dramatically. However, due to a dispute with the landowner over royalty payments, the sale fell through and McKenzie was unable to find another buyer. The mine ceased operations in 2001, and the site was fully reclaimed by 2006.

== Production ==
Of the nine volcanic pipes found, three were reported to contain diamonds, and two (KL-1 and KL-2) were mined. These two pipes are each approximately 10.5 acres (4.2 ha) in area, are at least 350 feet (110 m) deep, and are situated 0.5 miles (0.80 km) apart. Bulk sampling during exploration in 1990 and 1991 recovered grades of 3.4 to 4.5 carats per hundred tons (cpht) for diamonds larger than 2 millimetres (0.079 in). Of the diamonds recovered, 50-65% were gem quality, and 25-30% of those were 1 carat (0.20 g) or larger.

While Redaurum ran the operation, the mine ran at half-capacity and produced almost 12,000 carats in 1996 and 9,000 carats in 1997. Due to Redaurum's African operations taking most of their time and capital, during their tenure the mine was unprofitable. In addition McKenzie Bay estimated that due to Redaurum's outdated equipment only 40% of the mined ore yielded diamonds, on the order of 1.5 cpht.

When McKenzie Bay first acquired the mine, they estimated with their equipment improvements that they could recover 3.5 cpht from the ore. They also estimated that each of the two pipes being mined had about 340,000 carats worth of gems and could be profitably mined for about 10 years. The previous owners had a marketing agreement with local Denver diamond dealers to sell them Kelsey Lake diamonds for $115 per carat. If production had risen to the expected levels of 60,000 carats per year, McKenzie Bay expected to make $6.9 million annually. However, with the rising prices of vanadium McKenzie Bay shifted their focus away from Kelsey Lake and began mine reclamation procedures in 2003.

== Diamonds ==
The price of diamonds depends mainly on the 4 C's of diamonds - carat, color, clarity, cut. Because of this pricing system large gemstones are worth more than a comparable mass of smaller stones. For this reason a successful diamond mining operation can't rely solely on the mass of carats recovered. The Kelsey Lake mine has produced some large stones.

In 1994 a 14.2-carat, gem-quality white diamond was recovered. At the time the sixth-largest diamond ever found in North America, it was described as "almost flawless" and estimated to be worth $250,000.

In 1996 the largest diamond found at the mine was discovered. Named the "Colorado Diamond," it was a 28.3-carat (5.66 g) yellow stone and the fifth-largest diamond found in North America. The gem was cut and polished by legendary New York diamond cutter Bill Goldberg which yielded a 5.39-carat (1.078 g) faceted stone that sold for $87,500.

In July 1997, the company found two gem-quality stones weighing in at 16.3 carats and 28.2 carats. The 28.2 carat diamond was cut into a 16.86-carat stone, one of the largest finished stones ever produced in North America. The cut diamond is bigger than the gemstone produced from the "Uncle Sam" diamond, which was cut into a 12.42-carat stone.
