= Star of Murfreesboro =

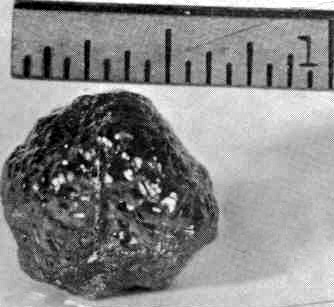
The Star of Murfreesboro

The Star of Murfreesboro is a 34.25 carats (6.850 g) blue diamond that is eleven-sixteenths of an inch (17 mm) in diameter. The diamond was found by John Pollock at the Arkansas Diamond Mine near Murfreesboro, Arkansas. Pollock found the diamond on March 1, 1964. It is the largest diamond ever found by a tourist in the Arkansas area. It was valued at $15,000.00 in 1964 ($152,076 in 2024).

The Star of Murfreesboro was featured in the September, 1966, edition of the Lapidary Journal article "60th Anniversary – Discovery of Diamonds in Arkansas".

As of 2006 the Pollock family still owned the diamond. It is occasionally loaned out for display at museums and gem shows.

The Arkansas Diamond Mine area is now contained in the Crater of Diamonds State Park.

== See also ==
- List of diamonds
