= Henry Dunay =

American goldsmith and jewelry designer (1935–2023)

- Born: 1 May 1935; Jersey City, New Jersey, U.S.
- Died: 10 November 2023 (aged 88); Brooklyn, New York, U.S.
- Known for: Jewelry
- Website: www.hddinc.net

Henry Paul Dunay (born Henry Loniewski, 1 May 1935 – 10 November 2023) was an American goldsmith and jewelry designer, best known for his fine scratched surface technique known as Sabi.

== Biography ==
Born Henry Loniewski in Jersey City, New Jersey, on May 1, 1935, he was the second of three sons of Polish Americans Henry and Helen Loniewski. At the age of 18, feeling that the name Loniewski would be an impediment, he changed it to Dunay, his mother’s short and memorable maiden name.

Dunay died in Brooklyn, New York, on November 10, 2023, at the age of 87.

== History ==
Having apprenticed in the workshop of New York City jeweler Rudolph Cacioli at the age of 14, Dunay learned the fine art of creating jewelry. Though starting as an errand boy, he quickly worked his way up to becoming a master model maker and setter at a remarkably young age, impressing Cacioli with the fineness of his work and the refinement of his proportions and curves. Observing that most jewelry in shop windows he peered into followed the same styles and dimensions, he started his own firm in 1956. Taking on work from other manufacturers, including Harry Winston, to support himself initially, Dunay quickly found success and fame after winning the De Beers Diamond International Award, which led to images of his designs being shown around the world.

Soon, Henry Dunay jewelry could be found in some of the most important jewelry stores, where shoppers were drawn to its unique style, sensuous curves, and exceptional craftsmanship. Jewelry was soon followed by timepieces, fragrances, and objet d'art. A key supporter was Neiman Marcus sachem Stanley Marcus, whose collaboration with Dunay represented the store's first forray into the sale of branded designer jewelry.

Dunay achieved notable success after the introduction of the Sabi finish. Inspired by the Japanese wabi-sabi aesthetic, which embraces asymmetry, simplicity, and the integrity of natural processes and objects. Described initially as "simple elegance," Sabi consisted of finely hand-etched lines that require remarkable precision and skill by Dunay to create the sophisticated look. Coinciding with the brand's rising popularity in Japan and the growing influence of Far Eastern cultures on its designs, Sabi once again affirmed Dunay's position as a leading jewelry designer, artist and trendsetter in the world of fine jewelry.

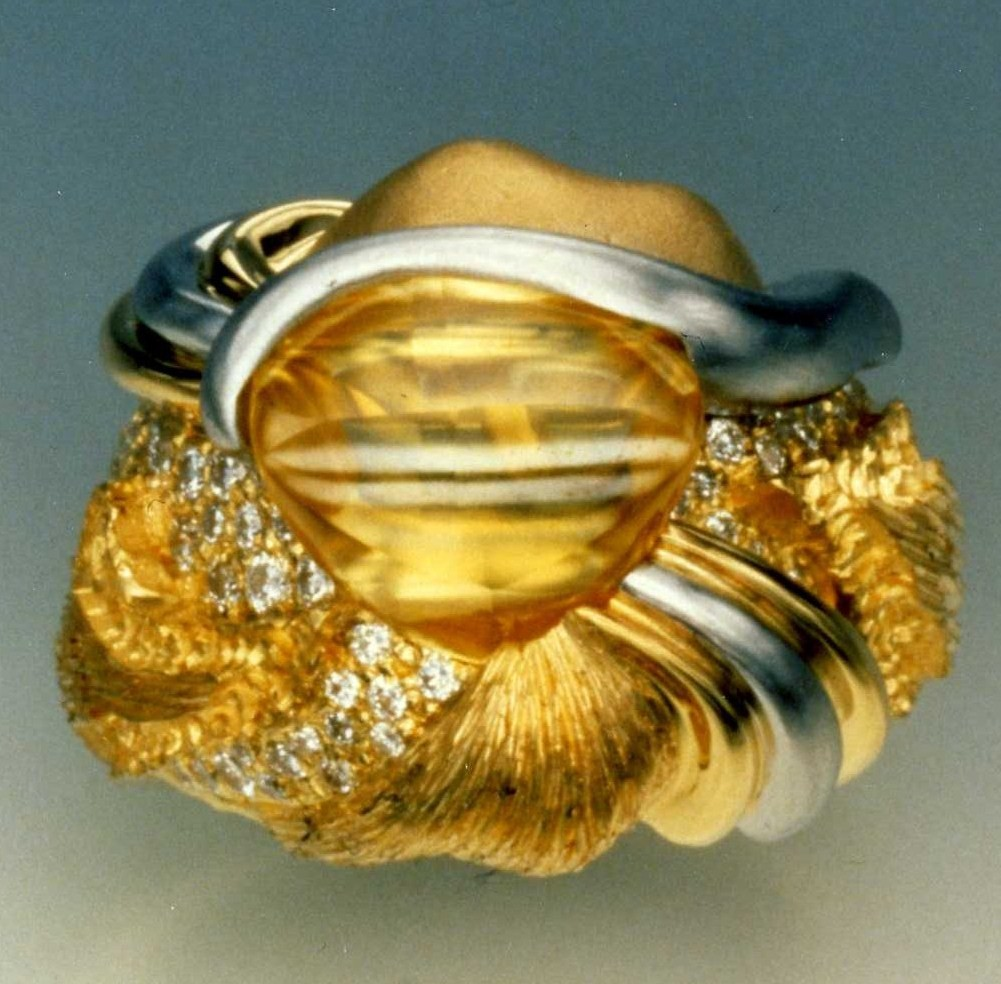
1992 Cynnabar ring for Hillary Clinton

Dunay designed a ring from an uncut Arkansas diamond for Hillary Clinton to wear to the 1993 inaugural balls.

Due to the impacts of the Great Recession, Henry Dunay Designs and its inventory valued at $50 million was sold at auction in December 2009. He later formed a new company, H.D.D. Inc., focusing on custom pieces.

Dunay continued to design and hand fabricate jewelry in New York City's Diamond District until his death.

== Awards ==
Henry Dunay won over 50 awards over fifty years. Dunay is the four time winner of the Diamond International award.

- 2001 Best in Design: Pearls Couture Jewelry Collection & Conference
- 2000 Robb Report Magazine June 12 Annual Best of the Best Jewelry Designer in the World
- 1999 Robb Report Magazine June 11 Annual Best of the Best Jewelry Designer in the World
- 1999 Robb Report Magazine Best American Jewelry Designer
- 1996 Contemporary Design Group Hall of Fame
- 1995 Watch and Clock Review First Prize
- 1995 Watch and Clock Review Citation for Excellence
- 1994 Diamonds International Award
- 1993 Lifetime Achievement Award- Modern Jewelry Magazine
- 1993 Diamond Today Award
- 1988 Spectrum Award- Gemstone Jewelry Design Competition awarded by the American Gem Trade Administration
- 1987 DeBeer's Men's Collection Award
- 1985 Platinum Award Japan
- 1985 Diamonds Today Award
- 1984 Spectrum Award- Gemstone Jewelry Design Competition awarded by the American Gem Trade Administration
- 1983 Johnston Matthey Platinum Design Award
- 1983 Award for Outstanding Achievement in Cultural Pearl Jewelry Design
- 1982 Johnston Matthey Platinum Design Award
- 1982 Diamonds International 3× Winner
- 1981 Cultured Pearl Association of Japan's Judge's Prize
- 1977 Diamonds Today Award
- 1975 Diamonds Today Award
- 1975 American Manufacturing Jewelers & Silversmiths Award
- 1970 Diamonds for Christmas Award
- 1969 Prix de Ville de Geneve de la Bijoutiere, del Joaiolerie, de l'Horlojerie et de l'Emaillllerie
- 1967 Diamonds International Award
