= Canary Diamond =

17.86 carat gem found in the US

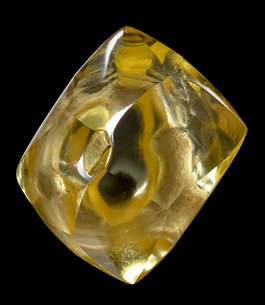
Canary Diamond

The Canary Diamond is an uncut canary-yellow 17.86 carat diamond found in 1917 at what is now the Crater of Diamonds State Park in Arkansas. It is in the collection of the Smithsonian Museum of Natural History. The diamond was in the collection of civil engineer and mineral collector Washington Roebling; his son donated it, along with the rest of Roebling's collection, to the museum in 1926 after Roebling's death.

== See also ==
- List of diamonds
