= Amarillo Starlight =

Diamond found in Arkansas, United States

The Amarillo Starlight is the largest diamond found by a park visitor in the Crater of Diamonds State Park in Arkansas since 1972, when it was established as a state park. The Amarillo Starlight was found by W. W. Johnson of Amarillo, Texas in 1975 while he was vacationing at the park with his family. When unearthed, it was a 16.37 carats (3.274 g) white diamond, but it has since been cut into a 7.54 carats (1.508 g) marquise shape. Its value has been estimated between $150,000 and $175,000.

== See also ==
- List of diamonds

== Sources ==
- Crater of Diamonds State Park
- Largest diamond found in park
