= Uncle Sam (diamond) =

American diamond found 1924

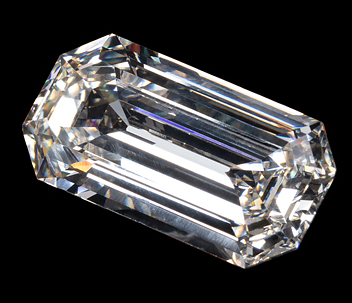
Uncle Sam diamond

Uncle Sam is the nickname for the largest diamond ever discovered in the United States. It was found in 1924 in Murfreesboro, Arkansas, at the Prairie Creek pipe mine, which later became known as the Crater of Diamonds State Park. The diamond was named "Uncle Sam" after the nickname of its finder, Wesley Oley Basham, a worker at the Arkansas Diamond Corporation.

The rough diamond as originally discovered weighed 40.23 carats (8.046 g). It was faceted twice by Schenck & Van Haelen of New York, which specialized in Arkansas diamonds, handling over 14,000. The company described those diamonds as being so hard that they could only be cut using powder of other Arkansas diamonds. The final result was a 12.42-carat (2.484 g) emerald-cut gem. It was characterized as M on the diamond color scale; this nominally corresponds to a faint yellow color, but the visual impression of Uncle Sam has been variously described as white or slight pink. Judging from the color, the diamond is most likely of pure IIa diamond type, meaning the number of impurities it has is only a few parts per million. The clarity of the stone was assessed as VVS1, which stands for Very Very Slightly Included and means the stone has minute non-diamond inclusions that are difficult for a skilled grader to see under 10x magnification.

The diamond was owned by Peikin Jewelers of Fifth Avenue, New York. It was lent by Peikin to the American Museum of Natural History for temporary display and storage. According to some reports, in 1971 it was acquired by a Boston dealer, Sidney de Young, and sold for US$150,000 to an anonymous private collector.

It was later acquired by Peter Buck, who donated it to the Smithsonian Museum of Natural History in June of 2022. It is displayed alongside the Canary Diamond, an uncut stone found at the Arkansas site in 1917.

The discovery of Uncle Sam arguably rescued the Arkansas Diamond Corporation, which had a debt over $276,470 (equivalent to $5.1 million in 2024) by that time and was going to be shut down in the winter of 1924. The number of diamonds found on the surface was decreasing, and the cost of digging operations was estimated as higher than the expected diamond recovery. The value of the diamond was not sufficient to cover the debts, but the discovery lifted spirits enough to keep the surface operations going.

== See also ==
- Crater of Diamonds State Park
- List of diamonds
