= Strawn-Wagner Diamond =

Diamond found in 1990

The Strawn-Wagner Diamond is one of a relatively few colorless, internally flawless diamonds ever found, weighing 3.03 carat (620 mg). It was found in 1990 by Shirley Strawn of Murfreesboro, Arkansas, in the Crater of Diamonds State Park public search field. It was cut to 1.09 carats (220 mg) in 1997, and graded a "perfect" 0/0/0 by the American Gem Society (AGS) in 1998 and graded perfect by the Gemological Institute of America, making it the first diamond from Arkansas to receive such an AGS grading. The diamond is considered one-in-a-billion, according to Peter Yantzer, the AGS Laboratory Director.

The diamond is in the collection of the Crater of Diamonds State Park after the park purchased it for $34,700.

== See also ==
- List of diamonds
