= Crater of Diamonds State Park =

Diamond mine and park in Arkansas, US

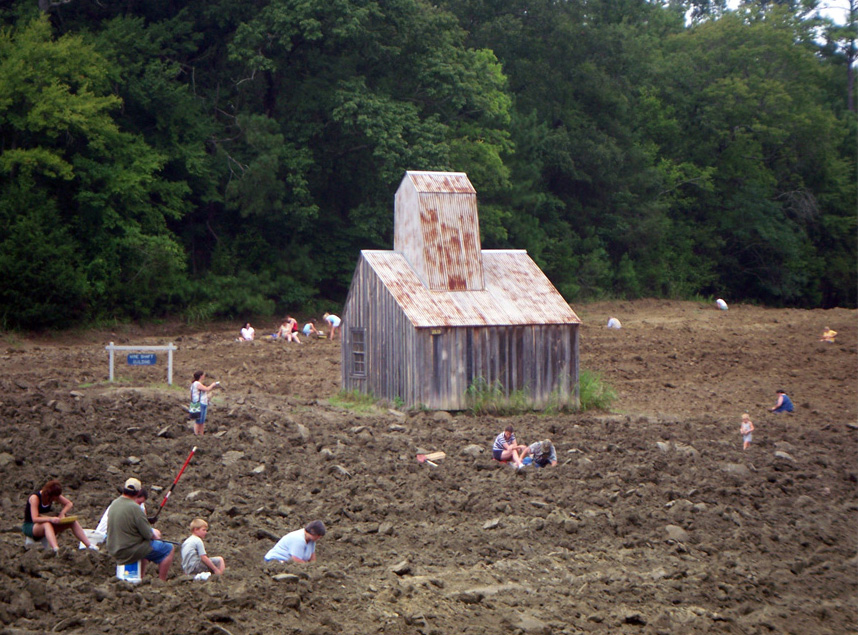

- Location within Arkansas Location within the United States
- Interactive map of Crater of Diamonds State Park
- Location: Murfreesboro, Arkansas United States
- Coordinates: 34°01′56″N 93°40′13″W
- Area: 911 acres (369 ha)
- Established: October 25, 2002
- Administrator: Arkansas Department of Parks, Heritage and Tourism
- Website: Official website
- Arkansas State Parks

Crater of Diamonds State Park is a 911-acre (369 ha) Arkansas state park in Pike County, Arkansas, in the United States. The park has a 37.5-acre (15.2-hectare) plowed field which is one of the few diamond-bearing sites accessible to the public. Diamonds have been discovered in the field continuously since 1906, including the graded-perfect Strawn-Wagner Diamond, found in 1990, and the Uncle Sam, found in 1924, which at over 40 carats is the largest diamond ever found in the United States.

The site became a state park in 1972 when the Arkansas Department of Parks and Tourism purchased the site from private owners in Dallas, Texas, which had operated the site as a tourist attraction.

== History ==
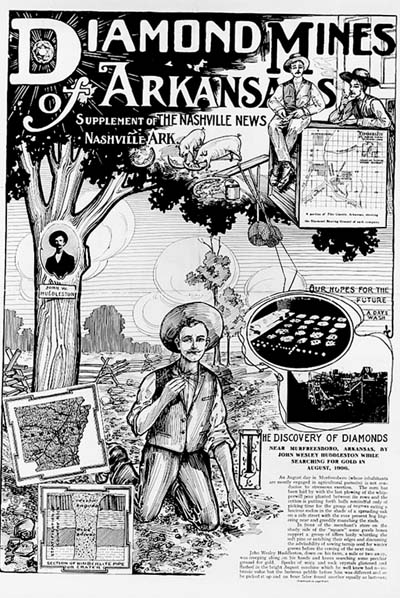
A supplement to the Nashville News of nearby Nashville, Arkansas, advertising diamonds mining in the early 1900s

In 1889, Arkansas state geologist John Branner investigated the site of an 1842 report noting an igneous intrusion amidst sedimentary rock near Murfreesboro. He determined it was kimberlite, but without any associated diamonds. In early 1906, John Wesley Huddleston purchased the area looking for gold. Instead, that August he found two diamonds, 3- and 4.5-carats identified by George Frederick Kunz. Visiting the site with Henry Stephens Washington, Kunz noted of the 140 diamonds collected from the surface, "They are absolutely perfect and are equal to the finest stones [of Africa] or that were ever found in India...Economical extraction [should be entirely] successful." The Arkansas Diamond Company was formed, headed by the Little Rock banker Samuel Reyburn, and Huddleston sold out for $36,000. Kunz and Washington prepared a mining plan for the 73 acre orebody, and initially 1400 diamonds were found in the regolith. Soon ten thousand prospectors started to search the outlying area for diamonds, and for fifty cents a day they could keep any diamonds found on the neighboring Mauney property. The Mauneys also sold lots for the town of Kimberly, which soon contained stores, restaurants, and a hotel. In 1908, the Arkansas Diamond Company hired John Fuller, a former De Beers engineer. Yet money was wasted, and the thousands of diamonds mined were mainly less than half a carat, and the few large ones were industrial grade. In 1912, the mine closed after running out of financial capital. Only a watchman and assistants continued looking for diamonds.

In 1912, Austin Q. Millar and his son Howard Millar rented and bought surrounding Murfreesboro properties, including the Mauney place, and established an ore processing system. For the next seven years, they mined thousands of modest stones. On 13 January 1919, the operation ended after arson burned the entire place.

In 1919, the Arkansas Diamond Company reorganized and hired Stanley Zimmerman, another engineer. However, he condemned the mine, and the company failed a second time. The 3000 gem-quality diamonds that had been stockpiled were later acquired by mortgage holder J.P. Morgan & Co. vice president Tom Cochran. The collection included the 40.23 carat Uncle Sam, discovered in 1924.

During the 1920s, the Arkansas Diamond Company was able to restart a small operation in which some diamonds were recovered before operations ended in 1932.

In 1941, Charles Wilkinson bought the property. During WWII, Wilkinson sent Arkansas Governor Homer Martin Adkins, Senator Hattie Caraway, and the head of Schenck & Van Haelen jewelers, to convince President Franklin Roosevelt to reopen the pipe, since the country was in need of industrial diamonds. The United States Bureau of Mines excavated 435 tons from the first 50 feet, but by 1944, had found only 32 diamonds, averaging a quarter-carat each. With the war over, the mine closed.

In 1951 The Diamond Preserve opened as a diamond mining attraction, followed the next year by Millar's Crater of Diamonds. In 1956, Winifred Parker found the 15.36-carat white Star of Arkansas. In 1957, Ruth McRae found the 3.11-carat white Eisenhower Diamond. In 1969, Millar sold his property to General Earth Minerals. In 1971, the Arkansas State Parks, Recreation, and Travel Commission voted to acquire the property for a state park.

== Geology ==
The Early Cretaceous Prairie Creek Diatreme outcrops include magmatic lamproite, pyroclastic lamproite where diamonds are recovered, and maar epiclastics. According to Howard and Hanson, "Lamproites form from partially melted mantle at depths exceeding 93 miles. The rising material is forced to the surface in volcanic pipes, bringing with it xenoliths and xenocryst diamonds from the harzburgitic peridotite or eclogite mantle regions where diamond formation is stabilized. In the instance of the Arkansas lamproites, the diamonds are of eclogite host origin."

In 2002, research by geologist Dennis Dunn (Ph.D. dissertation 2002) found that the diamondiferous epiclastic rocks range from olivine lamproite to phlogopite and olivine-rich tuffs. The chemistry of the mantle xenolith created maximum pressures of around 5 GPa and temperatures of 1000 °C for the upper mantle origin of the lamproitic magma.

== Recreation ==
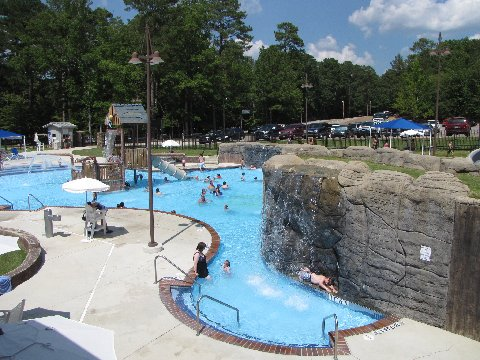
Pool at Crater of Diamonds State Park

Crater of Diamonds State Park is known for its 37.5-acre (15.2 ha) plowed field on which visitors can hunt for diamonds and other semi-precious gems. On average, two diamonds are found per day by park visitors. A visitor center contains information about the geology of the park, a gift shop, and a cafe. Interested persons can visit the Diamond Discovery Center, which offers an interpretive look at prospecting for diamonds. The Diamond Springs aquatic playground, enclosed pavilion, trails, and picnic areas surround the diamond field. The park offers camping facilities near the Little Missouri River.

=== Diamond mine ===
Crater of Diamonds State Park is situated over an eroded lamproite volcanic pipe. The park is open to the public and, for a small fee, rockhounds and visitors can dig for diamonds and other gemstones. Park visitors find more than 600 diamonds each year of all colors and grades. As of 2015, over 75,000 diamonds had been found in the crater. Visitors may keep any gemstone they find regardless of value.

In addition to diamonds, visitors may find semi-precious gems such as amethyst, agate, and jasper or approximately 40 other minerals such as garnet, phlogopite, quartz, baryte, and calcite.

== Diamonds found ==
Year	Diamond Name	Image	Weight (carat)	Weight (gram)	Color	Finder	Notes
1917	Canary		17.86	3.572	canary yellow	Lee J. Wagner of the Arkansas Diamond Company	Donated in 1926 to the National Museum of Natural History by the heirs of Washington Roebling
1924	Uncle Sam		40.23	8.046		Wesley Oley Basham	Largest diamond ever discovered in the United States; as of 2022 in the collection of the Smithsonian
1956	Star of Arkansas		15.33	3.066		Winifred Parker	
1964	Star of Murfreesboro		34.25	6.850		John Pollock	Largest diamond ever found by a tourist in the Arkansas area; it was valued at $15,000 in 1964.
1975	Amarillo Starlight		16.37	3.274		W. W. Johnson	Cut into a 7.54 carats (1.508 g) marquise.
1977	Kahn Canary		4.25	0.850	canary yellow	George Stepp	Uncut and naturally flawless. Set by Dunay into a ring for Hillary Clinton for a 1993 inaugural ball
1981	Star of Shreveport		8.82	1.764		Carroll Blankenship	
1990	Strawn-Wagner Diamond		3.09	0.618	white	Shirley Strawn	Found by a local resident, graded perfect. In the collection of the park.
2015	Esperanza Diamond		8.52	1.704	Type IIa, D IF	Bobbie Oskarson	Flawless or near flawless. Cut and polished in Arkansas by Mike Botha After cutting and polishing it was to be set by Erica Courtney then auctioned by Heritage Auctions.
2024	Carine Diamond		7.46	1.492	Chocolate	Julien Navas	Chocolate-colored. Eighth-largest diamond found in the United States. Found by Julien Navas for a wedding ring for his fiancée Carine Eizlini

== See also ==
- Kelsey Lake Diamond Mine, defunct similar commercial operation in Colorado
- National Register of Historic Places listings in Pike County, Arkansas
- List of diamonds
