= National Register of Historic Places listings in Pike County, Arkansas =

Location of Pike County in Arkansas

This is a list of the National Register of Historic Places listings in Pike County, Arkansas.

This is intended to be a complete list of the properties on the National Register of Historic Places in Pike County, Arkansas, United States. The locations of National Register properties for which the latitude and longitude coordinates are included below, may be seen in a map.

There are 9 properties listed on the National Register in the county.

Contents: Counties in Arkansas
- Arkansas
- Ashley
- Baxter
- Benton
- Boone
- Bradley
- Calhoun
- Carroll
- Chicot
- Clark
- Clay
- Cleburne
- Cleveland
- Columbia
- Conway
- Craighead
- Crawford
- Crittenden
- Cross
- Dallas
- Desha
- Drew
- Faulkner
- Franklin
- Fulton
- Garland
- Grant
- Greene
- Hempstead
- Hot Spring
- Howard
- Independence
- Izard
- Jackson
- Jefferson
- Johnson
- Lafayette
- Lawrence
- Lee
- Lincoln
- Little River
- Logan
- Lonoke
- Madison
- Marion
- Miller
- Mississippi
- Monroe
- Montgomery
- Nevada
- Newton
- Ouachita
- Perry
- Phillips
- Pike
- Poinsett
- Polk
- Pope
- Prairie
- Pulaski (Little Rock)
- Randolph
- St. Francis
- Saline
- Scott
- Searcy
- Sebastian
- Sevier
- Sharp
- Stone
- Union
- Van Buren
- Washington
- White
- Woodruff
- Yell

This National Park Service list is complete through NPS recent listings posted May 1, 2026.

== Current listings ==
	Name on the Register	Image	Date listed	Location	City or town	Description
1	Conway Hotel	Conway Hotel	March 6, 1986 (#86000384)	108 Courthouse Sq. 34°03′46″N 93°40′33″W	Murfreesboro	
2	Crater of Diamonds State Park	Crater of Diamonds State Park	June 18, 1973 (#73000386)	Southeast of Murfreesboro; 34°02′03″N 93°40′22″W	Murfreesboro	
3	Glenwood Iron Mountain Railroad Depot	Glenwood Iron Mountain Railroad Depot	June 28, 1996 (#96000692)	West of the junction of a Union Pacific Railroad line and U.S. Route 70; 34°19′17″N 93°32′45″W	Glenwood	
4	Jones General Store and Esso Station	Jones General Store and Esso Station	June 13, 2000 (#00000609)	Highway 84, W. 34°18′42″N 93°51′03″W	Langley	
5	Murfreesboro Cities Service Station	Murfreesboro Cities Service Station	May 19, 2003 (#03000400)	Northeastern side of the town square 34°03′45″N 93°41′22″W	Murfreesboro	
6	Pike County Courthouse	Pike County Courthouse	October 16, 1986 (#86002863)	Courthouse Sq. 34°03′43″N 93°41′23″W	Murfreesboro	
7	Rosenwald School	Rosenwald School	September 17, 1990 (#90001381)	Highway 26; 34°02′13″N 93°27′17″W	Delight	
8	Self Creek Bridge	Self Creek Bridge	June 9, 2000 (#00000635)	U.S. Route 70 across Self Creek and Lake Greeson; 34°14′11″N 93°45′24″W	Daisy	
9	Shelton-Lockeby House	Shelton-Lockeby House	September 28, 2005 (#05001079)	Springhill Church Rd. 34°03′28″N 93°44′43″W	Murfreesboro	

== Former listings ==
	Name on the Register	Image	Date listed	Date removed	Location	City or town	Description
1	O'Neel-Blackburn House		June 18, 1973 (#76000446)	October 4, 1999	W of Daisy off U.S. 70	Daisy vicinity	

== See also ==
- List of National Historic Landmarks in Arkansas
- National Register of Historic Places listings in Arkansas
