= Murfreesboro High School =

Location
- 605 Third Avenue; Murfreesboro, Arkansas 71958; United States
- Coordinates: 33°54′33″N 93°11′18″W

Information
- School type: Public
- School district: South Pike County School District (formerly Murfreesboro School District)
- Authority: Arkansas Department of Education (ADE)
- CEEB code: 041800
- Dean: Cheyana Burns
- Principal: Davey Jones
- Teaching staff: 45.06 (FTE)
- Grades: 7–12
- Enrollment: 323 (2023-2024)
- Student to teacher ratio: 7.17
- Education system: ADE Smart Core curriculum
- Classes offered: Regular, Advanced Placement
- Hours in school day: 7:51 to 3:22
- Campus type: Rural
- Colors: Red and White
- Athletics: football, cross country, basketball, baseball, softball, track & field, cheer, tennis, golf
- Athletics conference: 3A Region 7 (football); 2A Region 7 East (basketball)
- Mascot: Rattlesnake
- Team name: Murfreesboro Rattlers
- Accreditation: ADE
- Website: www.rattlers.org

Murfreesboro High School is an accredited public high school serving students in grades seven through twelve in the rural community of Murfreesboro, Arkansas, United States. It is one of three public high schools in Pike County. With more than 200 students, it is the sole high school of the South Pike County School District.

In addition to Murfreesboro, the district, and by extension the high school, also serves Delight, Antoine, Bowen, Billstown, Pike City, and Pisgah.

== History ==
On May 28, 1997, the school was destroyed in a fire. Its current campus opened in 1999.

Its school district was previously named the Murfreesboro School District. On July 1, 2010, the Murfreesboro district merged with the Delight School District to form the South Pike County School District. The Murfreesboro district absorbed the Delight district and then changed its name to South Pike County School District.

== Academics ==
The school is accredited by the Arkansas Department of Education (ADE). For the 2009–10 school year, Murfreesboro High School is rated by the ADE at Whole School Improvement - Achieving Year 2 in Adequate Yearly Progress.

The assumed course of study follows the Smart Core curriculum developed the Arkansas Department of Education (ADE), which requires students to complete at least 24 credit units before graduation. Students engage in regular (core) and career focus courses and exams and may select Advanced Placement (AP) coursework and exams that may lead to college credit.

Murfreesboro High School is listed Unranked in the Best High Schools Report 2012 by U.S. News & World Report.

== Extracurricular activities ==
The Murfreesboro High School mascot and athletic emblem is the rattlesnake stylized as the Rattlers with the school colors of red and white.

=== Athletics ===
The Murfreesboro Rattlers participate in various interscholastic activities in the 2A Classification within the 3A Region 7 (Football) Conference and 2A Region 7 (Basketball) Conference as administered by the Arkansas Activities Association. The Rattlers school athletic activities include football, basketball (boys/girls), tennis (boys/girls), baseball, softball, and track and field (boys/girls), golf (boys/girls)
