= Lodi, Arkansas =

Unincorporated community in Arkansas, United States

Coordinates: 34°18′39″N 93°42′27″W

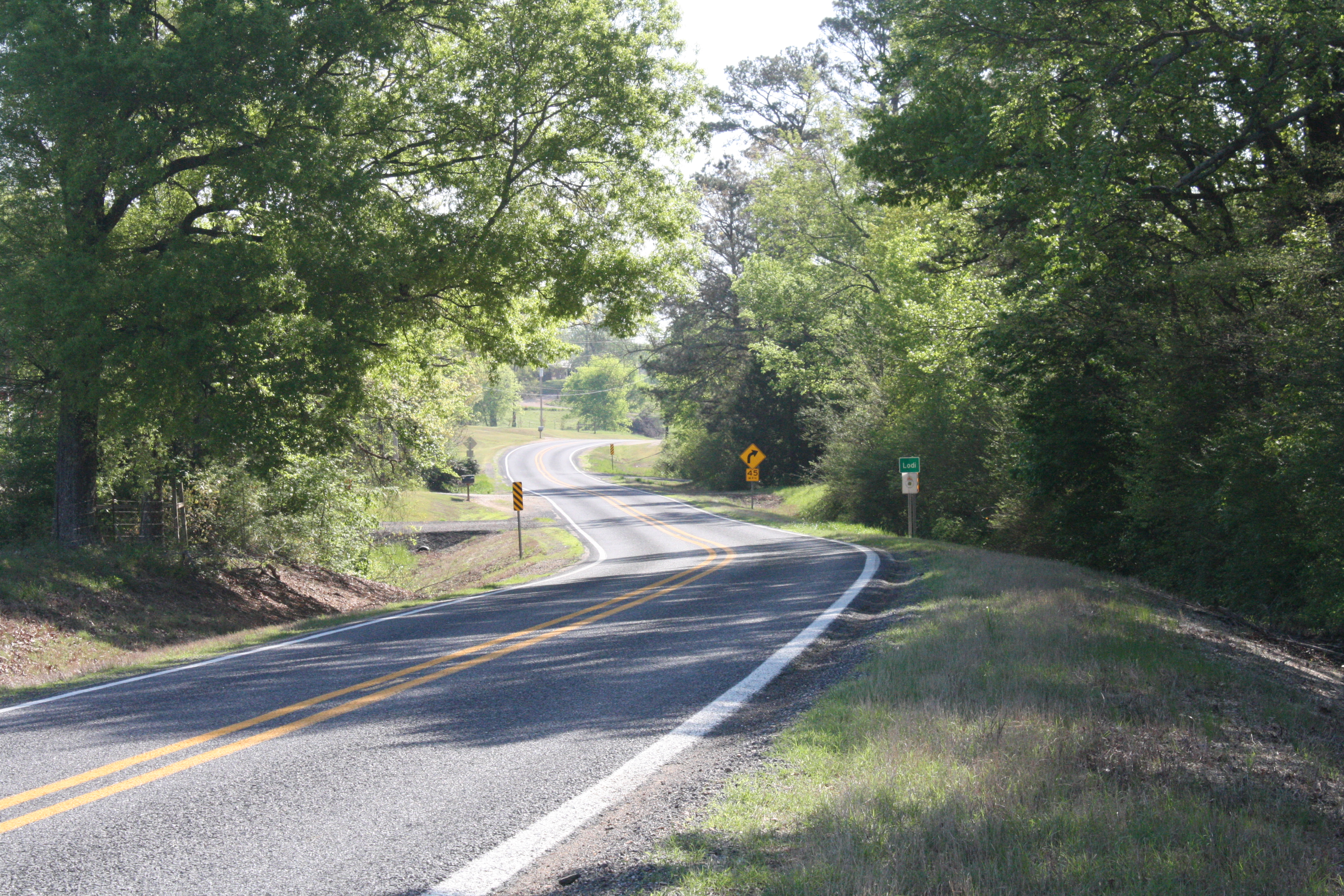
Sign for Lodi along AR 84

Lodi is an unincorporated community in northern Pike County, Arkansas, United States.

The community is on Arkansas Highway 84 between Langley (7 miles to the west) and Salem (4.5 miles to the east). Daisy on Lake Greeson is five miles to the south.
