= Shelton House =

Shelton House may refer to:

- Shelton-Lockeby House, Murfreesboro, AR, listed on the NRHP in Arkansas
- Shelton-Rich Farmstead, Webb City, AR, listed on the NRHP in Arkansas
- William Shelton House, Windsor, CT, listed on the NRHP in Connecticut
- David Shelton House, Talbotton, GA, listed on the NRHP in Georgia
- Shelton House (Raymond, Mississippi), listed on the NRHP in Mississippi
- Shelton Plantation House, Edenton, NC, listed on the NRHP in North Carolina
- Shelton House (Waynesville, North Carolina), listed on the NRHP in North Carolina
- Shelton-McMurphey House and Grounds, Eugene, OR, listed on the NRHP in Oregon
- Shelton-Houghton House, Amarillo, TX, listed on the NRHP in Texas
- William and Mary Shelton Farmstead, Seven Mile Creek, WI, listed on the NRHP in Wisconsin
