= Self Creek Bridge =

- U.S. National Register of Historic Places
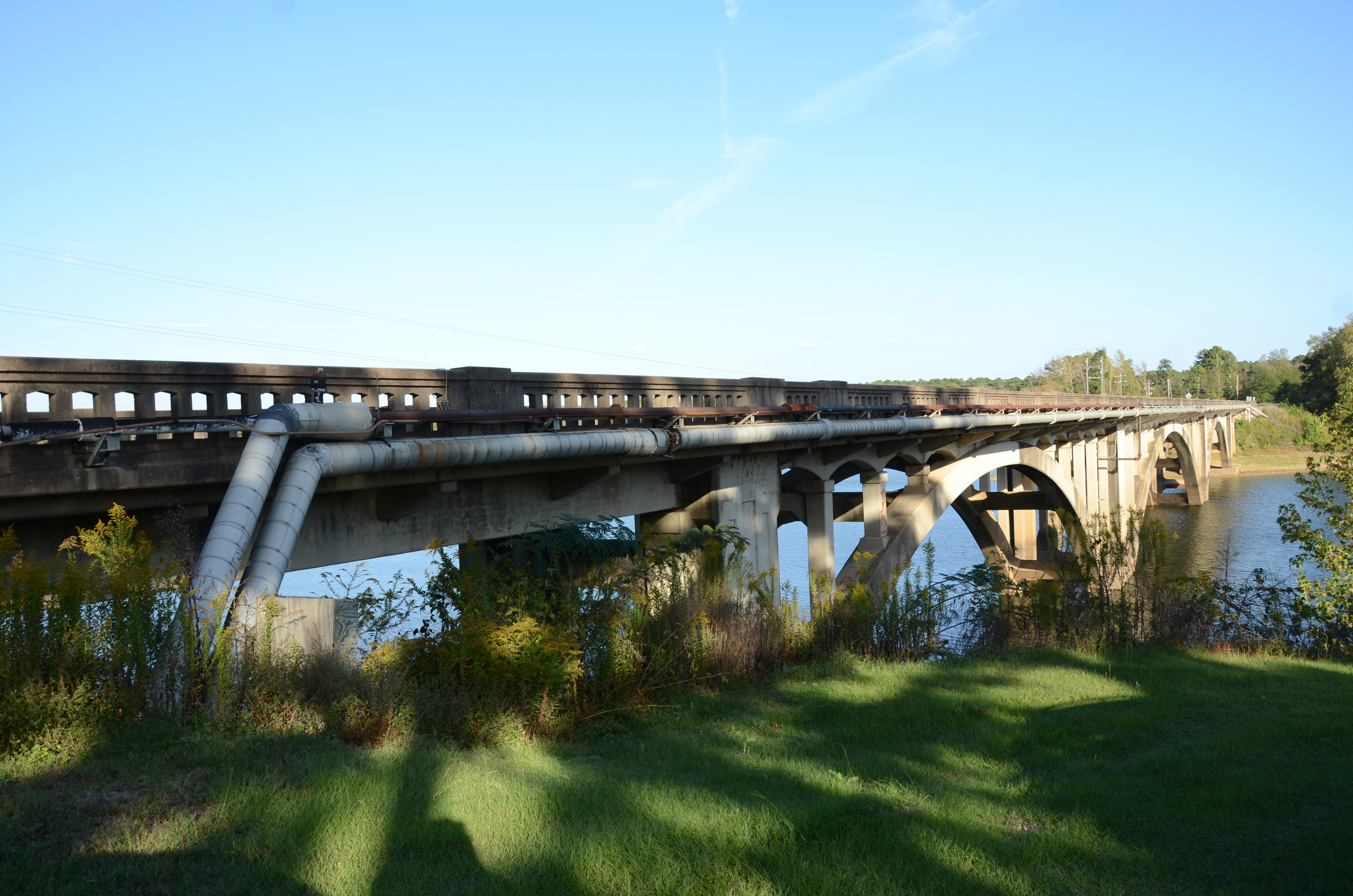

- Location within Arkansas Location within the United States
- Nearest city: Daisy, Arkansas
- Coordinates: 34°14′11″N 93°45′24″W
- Area: less than one acre
- Built: 1949
- Built by: D.F. Jones Construction
- Architect: Arkansas Department of Transportation
- Architectural style: Open spandrel deck arch
- MPS: Historic Bridges of Arkansas MPS
- NRHP reference No.: 00000635
- Added to NRHP: June 9, 2000

The Self Creek Bridge is a historic bridge near Daisy, Arkansas. The open spandrel deck arch bridge carries U.S. Route 70 over Self Creek near its mouth at Lake Greeson. It was built in 1949 at a cost of $287,000. It has three spans, with a total length of 692 feet (211 m). The bridge was built because the construction of the dam which impounds the lake required re-routing of the highway.

The bridge was listed on the National Register of Historic Places in 2000.

== See also ==
- List of bridges on the National Register of Historic Places in Arkansas
- National Register of Historic Places listings in Pike County, Arkansas
