= Murfreesboro Cities Service Station =

- U.S. National Register of Historic Places
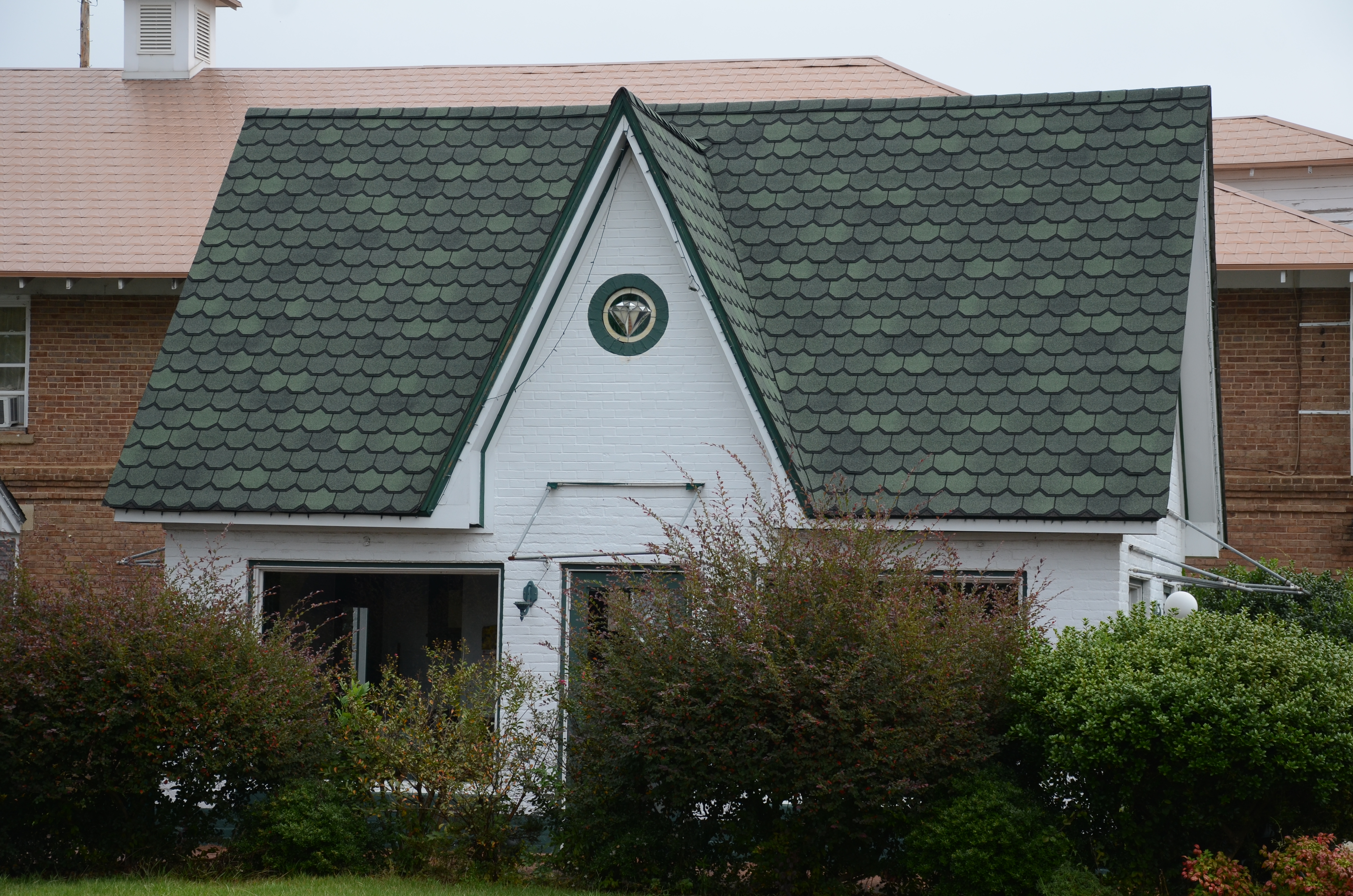

- Location within Arkansas Location within the United States
- Location: NE side of the Town Square, Murfreesboro, Arkansas
- Coordinates: 34°3′45″N 93°41′22″W
- Area: less than one acre
- Built: 1939
- Built by: Cities Service (now Citgo)
- Architect: A.P. Terrell
- Architectural style: Tudor Revival
- MPS: Arkansas Highway History and Architecture MPS
- NRHP reference No.: 03000400
- Added to NRHP: May 19, 2003

The Murfreesboro Cities Service Station is a historic automotive service station on Arkansas Highway 26, facing the northeast side of the town square in Murfreesboro, Arkansas. It is a simple single-story brick building with a cross-gable roof and modest English Revival styling. It was built in 1939 by A. P. Terrell, a local builder, using bricks from a building that had previously stood on the site. It was operated as a Cities Service (later Citgo) gas station into the 1980s, and was purchased by the Murfreesboro Community Foundation in 1989. The building plan for this structure is similar to that of other surviving Cities Service stations, including a station in Rison and another in Clinton.

The station was listed on the National Register of Historic Places in 2003.

== See also ==
- Jones General Store and Esso Station: Also in Pike County, Arkansas
- National Register of Historic Places listings in Pike County, Arkansas
