= Glenwood station =

Glenwood station may refer to:

- Glenwood station (Rochester), a former rapid transit station in Rochester, New York
- Glenwood station (Metro-North), a Metro-North commuter rail station in Yonkers, New York
- Glenwood Springs station, a railway station in Glenwood Springs, Colorado
- Glenwood Iron Mountain Railroad Depot, a historic train station in Glenwood, Arkansas

== See also ==
- Glenwood Generating Station, a power station in Glenwood Landing, New York
- Yonkers Power Station, an abandoned electrical plant in Glenwood, New York
