= Shelton-Lockeby House =

Historic house in Arkansas, United States

- U.S. National Register of Historic Places
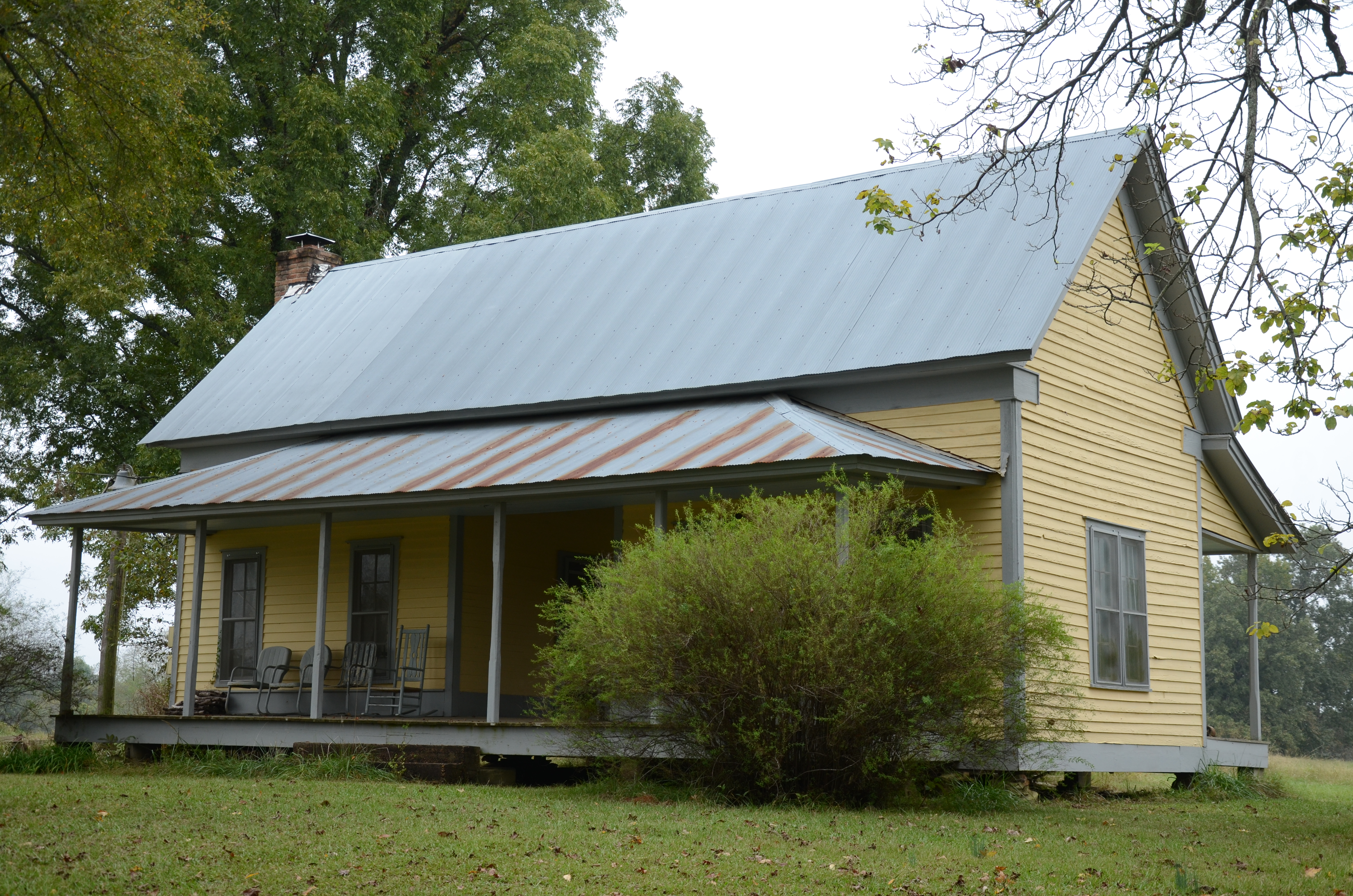

- Location within Arkansas Location within the United States
- Nearest city: Murfreesboro, Arkansas
- Coordinates: 34°3′28″N 93°44′43″W
- Area: 47 acres (19 ha)
- Built: 1905
- Architectural style: Dog-trot
- NRHP reference No.: 05001079
- Added to NRHP: September 28, 2005

The Shelton-Lockeby House is a historic house in rural Pike County, Arkansas. It is located on Springhill Church Road, about 0.6 miles (0.97 km) from its junction with Nathan Road, about 6 miles (9.7 km) west of the county seat Murfreesboro. The house is a dogtrot built in 1905 by Jim Lockeby. The house has been little altered since its construction, and is supplied with electricity but not running water. The only major addition has been kitchen cabinets. It is the best-preserved form of this type of house in the county.

The house, along with its surrounding 47 acres (19 ha), was listed on the National Register of Historic Places in 2005.

== See also ==
- National Register of Historic Places listings in Pike County, Arkansas
