= Kirby High School (Arkansas) =

Location
- 2614 AR 27 North; Kirby, Pike County, Arkansas 71950; United States
- Coordinates: 34°14′53″N 93°38′22″W

Information
- School type: Public comprehensive
- School district: Kirby School District
- Superintendent: Pike Palmer
- CEEB code: 040340
- NCES School ID: 050849000566
- Teaching staff: 29.77 (on FTE basis)
- Grades: 7–12
- Gender: Co-educational
- Enrollment: 199 (2023-2024)
- Student to teacher ratio: 6.68
- Education system: ADE Smart Core
- Classes offered: Regular, Advanced Placement (AP)
- Colors: Maroon and gray
- Athletics: Golf, basketball, baseball, softball, track
- Athletics conference: 1A-7 West
- Mascot: Trojans
- Team name: Kirby Trojans
- Accreditation: ADE
- Website: www.kirbytrojans.net

Kirby High School is an accredited public high school located in the rural community of Kirby, Arkansas, United States. The school provides comprehensive secondary education for more than 200 students each year in grades 7 through 12. It is one of three public high schools in Pike County, Arkansas and the only high school administered by the Kirby School District.

== Academics ==
Kirby High School is accredited by the Arkansas Department of Education (ADE). The assumed course of study follows the Smart Core curriculum developed by the ADE. Students complete regular (core and elective) and career focus coursework and exams and may take Advanced Placement (AP) courses and exams with the opportunity to receive college credit. Kirby is a member of the Dawson Education Service Cooperative, which provides career and technical education programs for the area's high school students in multiple school districts.

== Athletics ==
The Kirby High School mascot and athletic emblem are the Trojans, with maroon and gray serving as the school colors.

The Kirby Trojans compete in interscholastic activities within the 1A Classification from the 1A-7 West Conference as administered by the Arkansas Activities Association. The Trojans participate in golf (boys/girls), basketball (boys/girls), baseball, and softball.
