= Kirby School District =

School district in Arkansas, United States

Address
- 2614 Highway 27 North Kirby, Arkansas, 71950; United States

District information
- Type: Public
- Grades: PreK–12
- NCES District ID: 0508490

Students and staff
- Students: 423
- Teachers: 42.05
- Staff: 23.13
- Student–teacher ratio: 10.06

Other information
- Website: www.kirbytrojans.net

Kirby School District is a school district headquartered in Kirby, Arkansas. It is one of three school districts in Pike County.

The district includes Kirby, Daisy, and a small slice of Glenwood.

== Schools ==
- Kirby High School
- Kirby Elementary School
