= South Pike County School District =

School district in Arkansas, United States

Address
- 605 3rd Ave Murfreesboro, Arkansas, 71958; United States

District information
- Grades: Pre-K–12
- Established: 2010; 16 years ago
- Superintendent: Tanya Wilcher
- Accreditation: Arkansas Department of Education
- Schools: 2
- NCES District ID: 0510320

Students and staff
- Students: 725
- Teachers: 89.33
- Staff: 58.25
- Student–teacher ratio: 8.12
- District mascot: Rattlers
- Colors: Red; White

Other information
- Website: www.rattlers.org

South Pike County School District, formerly Murfreesboro School District, is a public school district based in Murfreesboro, Arkansas, USA.

The school district encompasses 219.99 square miles (569.8 km^{2}) of land in Pike and Clark counties. In addition to Murfreesboro, the district also serves Delight, Antoine, Bowen, Billstown, Pike City and Pisgah.

== History ==
On February 25, 2010, the Delight School District, which was required to merge with another school district due to its low student population, asked the Arkansas Board of Education to be merged into the adjacent Murfreesboro district.

On July 1, 2010, the Murfreesboro School District and the Delight School District merged to form the South Pike County School District. The Murfreesboro district absorbed the Delight district and then changed its name to South Pike County School District.

== Demographics ==
In 2010, the pre-merger Murfreesboro district had 545 students, including 482 Whites, 26 Hispanics, and 24 African-Americans.

== Schools ==
- Murfreesboro Elementary School, serving prekindergarten through grade 6.
- Murfreesboro High School, serving grades 7 through 12.
