= Conway Hotel =

- U.S. National Register of Historic Places
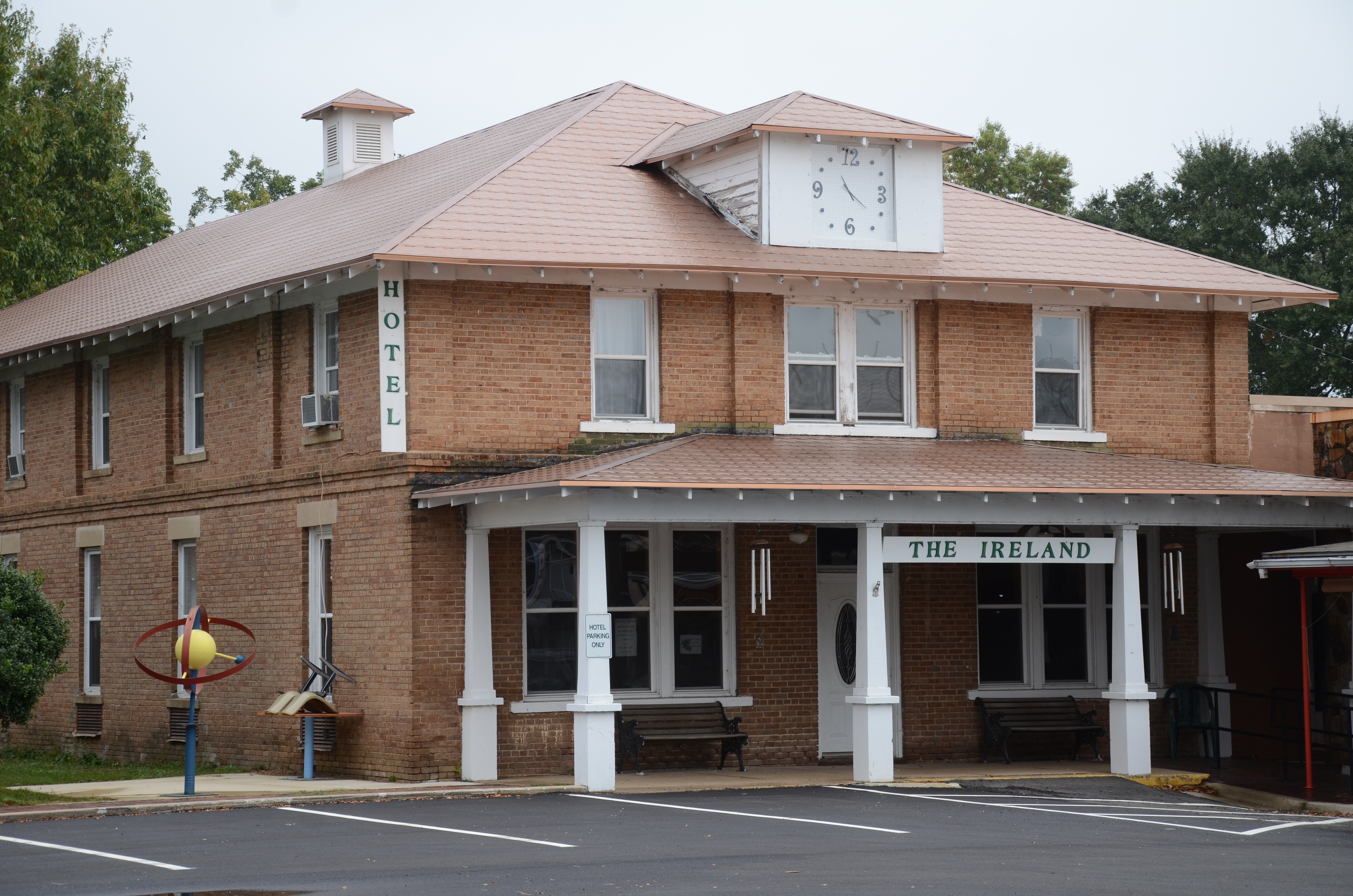

- Location within Arkansas Location within the United States
- Location: 108 Courthouse Sq., Murfreesboro, Arkansas
- Coordinates: 34°3′46″N 93°40′33″W
- Area: less than one acre
- Built: 1913
- Architect: W. J. Lockeby
- NRHP reference No.: 86000384
- Added to NRHP: March 6, 1986

The Conway Hotel is a historic hotel building at 108 Courthouse Square in Murfreesboro, Arkansas. Built in 1913, it was the first brick hotel building in the rural town; it was built in response to an influx of diamond miners into the area after the Crater of Diamonds was discovered. It is a two-story structure with modest Craftsman styling.

The building was listed on the National Register of Historic Places in 1986.

== See also ==
- National Register of Historic Places listings in Pike County, Arkansas
