= Kirby, Arkansas =

- Census-designated place
- Location of Kirby in Pike County, Arkansas.

- Location within Arkansas
- Coordinates: 34°15′01″N 93°38′29″W
- Country: United States
- State: Arkansas
- County: Pike

Area
  - Total: 15.40 sq mi (39.88 km^{2})
  - Land: 14.48 sq mi (37.50 km^{2})
  - Water: 0.92 sq mi (2.39 km^{2})
- Elevation: 666 ft (203 m)

Population (2020)
  - Total: 721
  - Density: 49.8/sq mi (19.23/km^{2})
- Time zone: UTC-6 (Central (CST))
  - Summer (DST): UTC-5 (CDT)
- Area code: 870
- GNIS feature ID: 2612128

Kirby is an unincorporated census-designated place in northern Pike County, Arkansas, United States. The community lies on U.S. Route 70; it is located halfway between Daisy and Glenwood. Per the 2020 census, the population was 721.

== Education ==
Public education for elementary and secondary school students is provided by the Kirby School District, which includes:

- Kirby Elementary School, serving kindergarten through grade 6.
- Kirby High School, serving grades 7 through 12.

The schools' mascot and athletic teams are the Trojans with maroon and gray as the school colors.

== Demographics ==
Historical population
Census	Pop.	Note	%±
2010	786		—
2020	721		−8.3%
U.S. Decennial Census; 2010 2020

=== 2020 census ===
Kirby CDP, Georgia – Demographic Profile (NH = Non-Hispanic) Note: the US Census treats Hispanic/Latino as an ethnic category. This table excludes Latinos from the racial categories and assigns them to a separate category. Hispanics/Latinos may be of any race.
Race / Ethnicity	Pop 2010	Pop 2020	% 2010	% 2020
White alone (NH)	761	645	96.82%	89.46%
Black or African American alone (NH)	1	0	0.13%	0.00%
Native American or Alaska Native alone (NH)	0	1	0.00%	0.14%
Asian alone (NH)	0	0	0.00%	0.00%
Pacific Islander alone (NH)	0	0	0.00%	0.00%
Some Other Race alone (NH)	0	2	0.00%	0.28%
Mixed Race/Multi-Racial (NH)	18	45	2.29%	6.24%
Hispanic or Latino (any race)	6	28	0.76%	3.88%
Total	786	721	100.00%	100.00%
