= Ka-Do-Ha Indian Village =

Tourist Attraction in Arkansas, USA

Coordinates: 34°3′52.09″N 93°43′55.56″W

Ka-Do-Ha Indian Village is a tourist attraction near Murfreesboro, Arkansas. The site may be a late Caddo settlement (Caddo Mound Builders), but has never been professionally excavated.
