= Billstown, Arkansas =

Unincorporated community in Arkansas, United States

- Unincorporated community
- Location within Arkansas Location within the United States
- Coordinates: 33°58′51″N 93°34′16″W
- Country: United States
- State: Arkansas
- County: Pike
- Elevation: 328 ft (100 m)
- Time zone: UTC-6 (Central (CST))
  - Summer (DST): UTC-5 (CDT)
- Area code: 870
- GNIS feature ID: 76349

Billstown (also Bills Town, Bills) is an unincorporated community in Pike County, Arkansas, United States. Billstown is located on Arkansas Highway 301 near the Little Missouri River. First settled in 1858, Billstown has active timber and some cattle farming.

== Education ==
It is in the South Pike County School District.

It was previously in the Delight School District. On July 1, 2010, the Delight district merged with the Murfreesboro district to form the South Pike County School District. Before World War II, Billstown supported a small elementary school at the Billstown Cemetery.

== Notable people ==
- Glen Campbell (1936–2017), singer, actor, and entertainer, was born in Billstown and buried in the Campbell family cemetery in Billstown.
- Rep. Alvis W. Stokes (1907–1986) born in Billstown, served in the state legislature in 1959 and 1961, as well as judge for Pike County. An active poultry and cattle farmer, he also served on the board of the Bank of Delight. Prior to World War II, he owned and operated a nursery and produced sorghum molasses under the business name W.R. Stokes & Son. He is buried with his wife Clarice E. Stokes, teacher and homemaker, in Delight, Arkansas.
