= Quicksilver Rush =

The Quicksilver Rush (ca. early 1930s) was a mining rush for cinnabar in southwest Arkansas and the Ozarks, mostly in Pike and Clark counties, beginning around 1931, in the early days of the Great Depression when people were desperate for jobs.

The mining of cinnabar sparked a brief but immediate employment boom for the towns of Amity, Murfreesboro, and Graysonia. The latter was at the end of being a booming mill town, and was in the process of closing its mills, with its population of over one thousand people now being unemployed. For a brief time, it appeared that the discovery of cinnabar would save that town.

The rush also caused an influx of around one thousand people not from the area, which increased the local economy in the way of supplies and whiskey sales. Miners rushed to lay claims for mining rights, mostly in a mountainous area about five miles south of Amity in the foothills of the Ouachita Mountains. Two companies, "Southwestern Quicksilver Company" and the "Arkansas Quicksilver Company", were the main employers. The rush was short-lived, but did provide employment in the area for almost a decade. With cinnabar being more readily available from other sources, the mines eventually closed, and by the beginning of World War II all mining of any significance had ended, and by this time the rush itself had been over for a number of years.

In 1939, the area produced more than 1,200 steel flasks (standard unit of measure containing 76 pounds (34 kg)) for shipment.
