= Jones General Store and Esso Station =

- U.S. National Register of Historic Places
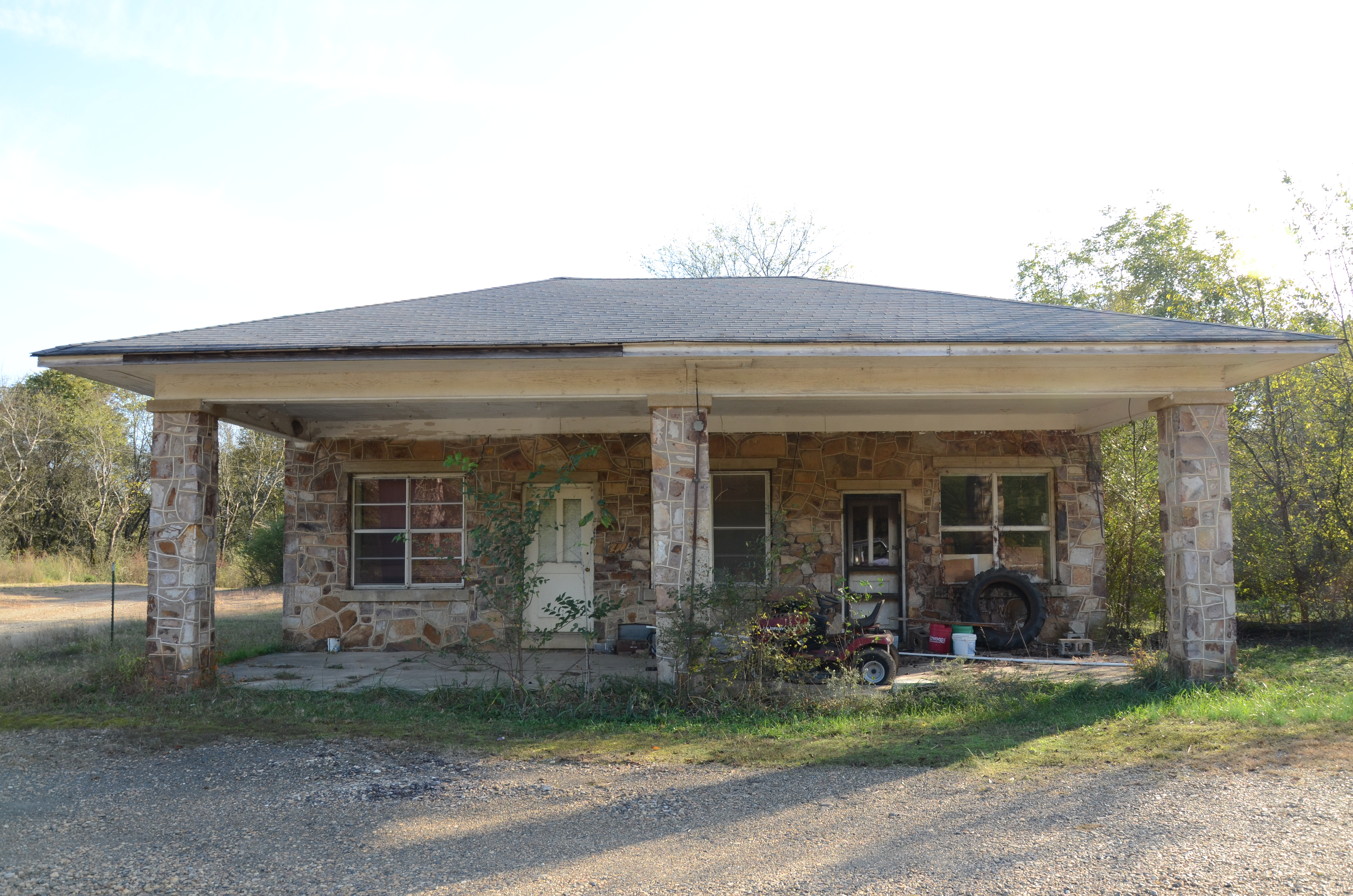

- Location within Arkansas Location within the United States
- Nearest city: Langley, Arkansas
- Coordinates: 34°18′42″N 93°51′3″W
- Area: less than one acre
- Built: 1939
- Architectural style: Bungalow/craftsman
- MPS: Arkansas Highway History and Architecture MPS
- NRHP reference No.: 00000609
- Added to NRHP: June 13, 2000

The Jones General Store and Esso Station is a historic Esso automotive service station and general store on Arkansas Highway 84 in Langley, Arkansas. It is a single-story structure built out of fieldstone, with concrete door and window lintels. The car porch extends in front of the building, supported by three fieldstone columns topped by simple capitals. It was built in 1939, and served as the town's general store, operated by Johnny Jones, until the 1980s, when the store closed and the building was converted to residential use. The building is locally significant in part for a circular millstone, used in the town's first gristmill, which is embedded in the wall near the eastern corner.

The property was listed on the National Register of Historic Places in 2000.

== See also ==
- Murfreesboro Cities Service Station: Also in Pike County, Arkansas
- National Register of Historic Places listings in Pike County, Arkansas
