= Rosenwald School (Delight, Arkansas) =

- U.S. National Register of Historic Places
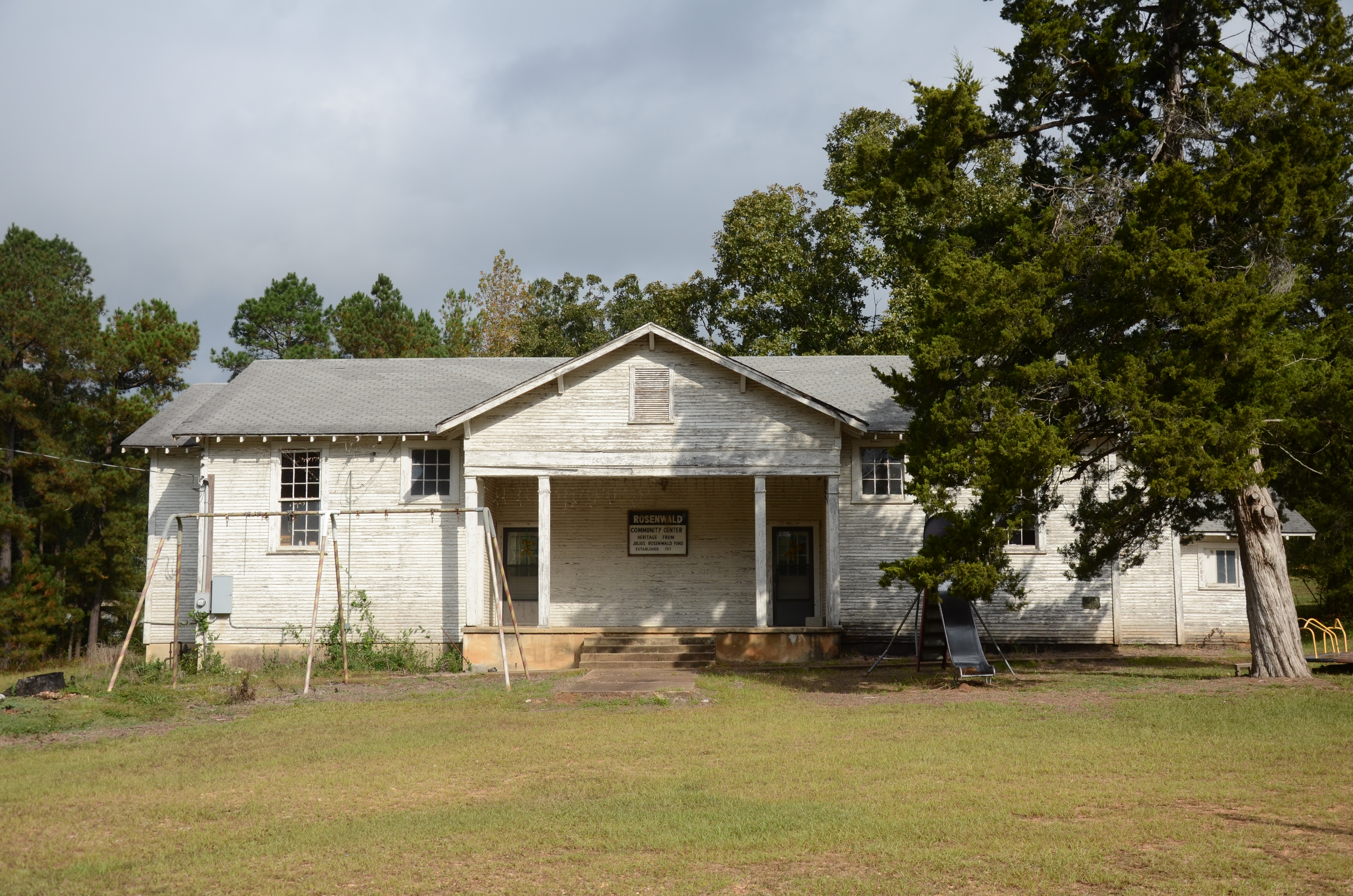

- Location within Arkansas Location within the United States
- Nearest city: Delight, Arkansas
- Coordinates: 34°2′13″N 93°27′17″W
- Area: less than one acre
- Built: 1938
- Built by: Works Progress Administration
- Architectural style: Colonial Revival
- NRHP reference No.: 90001381
- Added to NRHP: September 17, 1990

Rosenwald School is a Rosenwald school on Arkansas Highway 26 in Delight, Arkansas. The school, a single-story wood-frame structure with a gable roof, was built in 1938 by the Works Progress Administration. Philanthropist Julius Rosenwald sponsored the Rosenwald schools to provide education for African-Americans in rural communities; the Julius Rosenwald Fund helped build 389 schools in Arkansas, including the one in Delight. The school closed in the 1970s, when many of the Rosenwald schools closed due to desegregation. It is now used as a local community center.

The Rosenwald School was added to the National Register of Historic Places in 1990.

== See also ==
- National Register of Historic Places listings in Pike County, Arkansas
