= Glenwood station (Arkansas) =

- Glenwood Iron Mountain Railroad Depot
- U.S. National Register of Historic Places
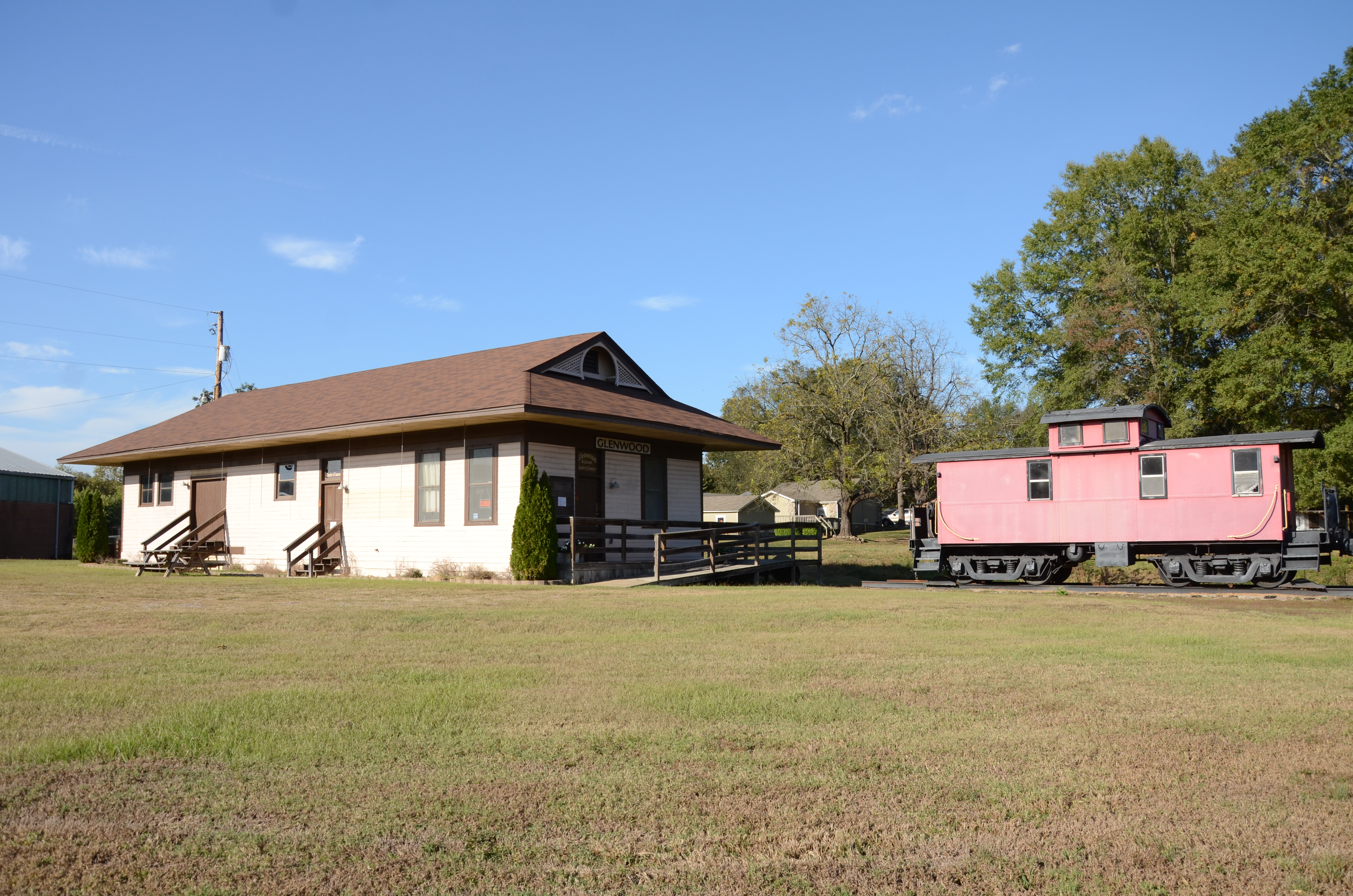

- Location within Arkansas Location within the United States
- Location: W of jct. of Union Pacific RR and US 70, Glenwood, Arkansas
- Coordinates: 34°19′17″N 93°32′45″W
- Area: less than one acre
- Architectural style: Plain Traditional
- MPS: Historic Railroad Depots of Arkansas MPS
- NRHP reference No.: 96000692
- Added to NRHP: June 28, 1996

The Glenwood Iron Mountain Railroad Depot is a historic train station building in Glenwood, Arkansas. It is a single-story wood-frame structure, located just west of the point were U.S. Route 70 crosses the Union Pacific tracks. It was built c. 1910 by the St. Louis, Iron Mountain and Southern Railway, and used by that railroad and its successor, the Missouri Pacific Railroad until 1969. It was sold that year and relocated out of town for use as a hay barn. The city purchased the building in 1995, and returned it to a location a short way south of its original location, which is now occupied by a major road intersection.

The depot was listed on the National Register of Historic Places in 1996.

== See also ==
- National Register of Historic Places listings in Pike County, Arkansas

Preceding station	Missouri Pacific Railroad	Following station
Norman Terminus	Norman - Natchez	Graysonia toward Natchez
