= National Register of Historic Places listings in Arkansas =

This is a list of properties and historic districts in Arkansas that are listed on the National Register of Historic Places. There are more than 2,600 listings in the state, including at least 8 listings in each of Arkansas's 75 counties.

Contents: Counties in Arkansas
- Arkansas
- Ashley
- Baxter
- Benton
- Boone
- Bradley
- Calhoun
- Carroll
- Chicot
- Clark
- Clay
- Cleburne
- Cleveland
- Columbia
- Conway
- Craighead
- Crawford
- Crittenden
- Cross
- Dallas
- Desha
- Drew
- Faulkner
- Franklin
- Fulton
- Garland
- Grant
- Greene
- Hempstead
- Hot Spring
- Howard
- Independence
- Izard
- Jackson
- Jefferson
- Johnson
- Lafayette
- Lawrence
- Lee
- Lincoln
- Little River
- Logan
- Lonoke
- Madison
- Marion
- Miller
- Mississippi
- Monroe
- Montgomery
- Nevada
- Newton
- Ouachita
- Perry
- Phillips
- Pike
- Poinsett
- Polk
- Pope
- Prairie
- Pulaski (Little Rock)
- Randolph
- St. Francis
- Saline
- Scott
- Searcy
- Sebastian
- Sevier
- Sharp
- Stone
- Union
- Van Buren
- Washington
- White
- Woodruff
- Yell

This National Park Service list is complete through NPS recent listings posted October 9, 2026.

== Numbers of properties and districts by county ==
The following are tallies of current listings in Arkansas on the National Register of Historic Places. These counts are based on entries in the National Register Information Database as of April 24, 2008 and new weekly listings posted since then on the National Register of Historic Places web site. There are frequent additions to the listings and occasional delistings and the counts here are not official. Also, the counts in this table exclude boundary increase and decrease listings which modify the area covered by an existing property or district and which carry a separate National Register reference number.

	County	# of Sites
1	Arkansas	26
2	Ashley	28
3	Baxter	23
4	Benton	136
5	Boone	21
6	Bradley	17
7	Calhoun	10
8	Carroll	30
9	Chicot	22
10	Clark	44
11	Clay	17
12	Cleburne	18
13	Cleveland	14
14	Columbia	24
15	Conway	60
16	Craighead	24
17	Crawford	33
18	Crittenden	18
19	Cross	18
20	Dallas	42
21	Desha	27
22	Drew	27
23	Faulkner	66
24	Franklin	23
25	Fulton	10
26	Garland	98
27	Grant	11
28	Greene	18
29	Hempstead	28
30	Hot Spring	31
31	Howard	13
32	Independence	45
33	Izard	18
34	Jackson	15
35	Jefferson	75
36	Johnson	35
37	Lafayette	10
38	Lawrence	27
39	Lee	12
40	Lincoln	9
41	Little River	16
42	Logan	44
43	Lonoke	35
44	Madison	12
45	Marion	26
46	Miller	35
47	Mississippi	44
48	Monroe	41
49	Montgomery	14
50	Nevada	19
51	Newton	14
52	Ouachita	41
53	Perry	14
54	Phillips	58
55	Pike	9
56	Poinsett	21
57	Polk	32
58	Pope	43
59	Prairie	15
60.1	Pulaski: Little Rock	281
60.2	Pulaski: Other	91
60.3	Pulaski Total	372
61	Randolph	18
62	St. Francis	16
63	Saline	22
64	Scott	14
65	Searcy	53
66	Sebastian	60
67	Sevier	18
68	Sharp	28
69	Stone	57
70	Union	40
71	Van Buren	17
72	Washington	154
73	White	187
74	Woodruff	17
75	Yell	30
(duplicates):		(8)
TOTAL		2,851

== See also ==
- List of National Historic Landmarks in Arkansas
- List of bridges on the National Register of Historic Places in Arkansas
- List of historical societies in Arkansas
