= Delight School District =

Defunct school district in Arkansas, United States

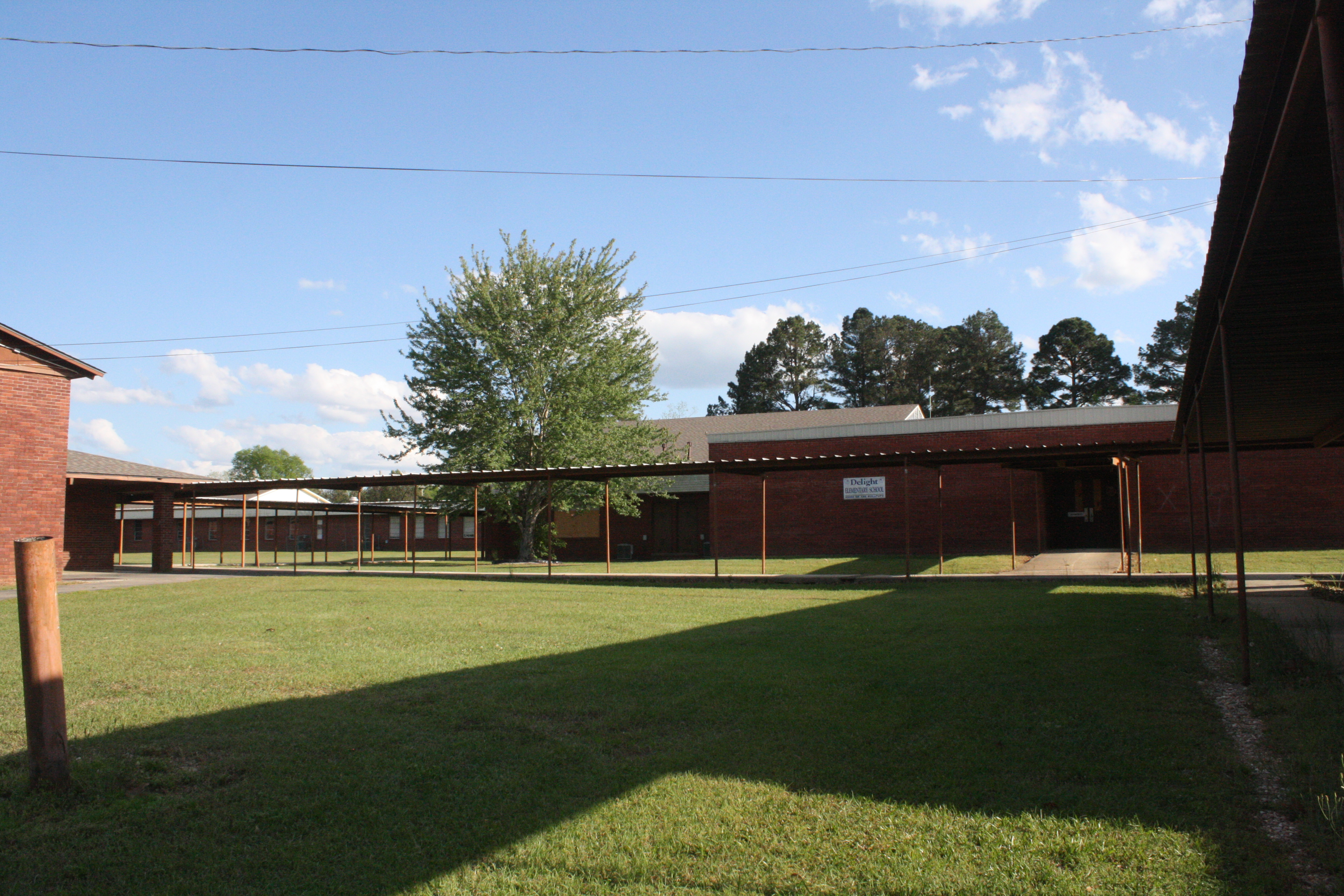

Location
- Delight Arkansas; United States
- Coordinates: 34°1′43.41″N 93°29′58.01″W

District information
- Established: 1972
- Closed: July 1, 2010

Delight School District No. 44 or Delight Public Schools was a school district headquartered in Delight, Arkansas. It operated an elementary school and a high school. The district occupied portions of Pike and Clark counties.

In addition to Delight, the district served residents of Antoine, Bowen, Billstown, Pike City, and Pisgah. The district also stated it served Okolona; Okolona itself is within the Gurdon School District.

In 2001 the Delight district had 29 preschool students; that year it also had 206 elementary school students and 170 secondary students for a total of 376 in K-12. In 2010 it merged into the South Pike County School District.

== History ==
Sometime before 1900 a two-story building was constructed to serve as the community's school; in 1924 a fire destroyed the building. In 1926 grades 11 and 12 opened; the district previously went to grade 10. In 1927 Coach N.C. Crain asked athletes to pick the school colors and mascot while traveling to an athletics match.

On July 1, 1987, the Okolona School District was dissolved; a portion went to the Delight School District.

By 2010 the student population of Delight had fallen below 350, which required the district to be merged into another district under Arkansas law. That year the Delight district and the Weiner School District, another school district under the 350 student limit, attempted a voluntary merger, but the Arkansas Board of Education (ABE) declined on the grounds of the two districts being too far apart. Weiner instead ultimately merged with the Harrisburg School District.

On February 25, 2010, the Delight district asked the ABE to be instead merged into the adjacent Murfreesboro School District, which had 545 students. On July 1, 2010, the Delight district merged with the Murfreesboro district to form the South Pike County School District.

== Campus ==
The campus had main classroom buildings for elementary and secondary students. It also had a preschool building, a cafeteria, a gymnasium, a home economics building, a building for biological sciences and business classes, an art building, an agricultural classroom/shop facility, the Pickett Building, and a bus barn.

In 1978 the main classroom buildings for both elementary and secondary levels opened. The final gymnasium opened in 1982, replacing a 1950 building that was destroyed in a fire in 1982. The Works Progress Administration (WPA) had built a previous high school building. The WPA also built the agriculture, Pickett, and home economics facilities. The cafeteria built in 1965, received a renovation about 15–20 years later. The campus was turned over to the city of Delight in 2021.
