= Salem, Pike County, Arkansas =

Coordinates: 34°18′40″N 93°37′04″W

Salem is an unincorporated community in Pike County, Arkansas.
