= Delight, Arkansas =

- Town
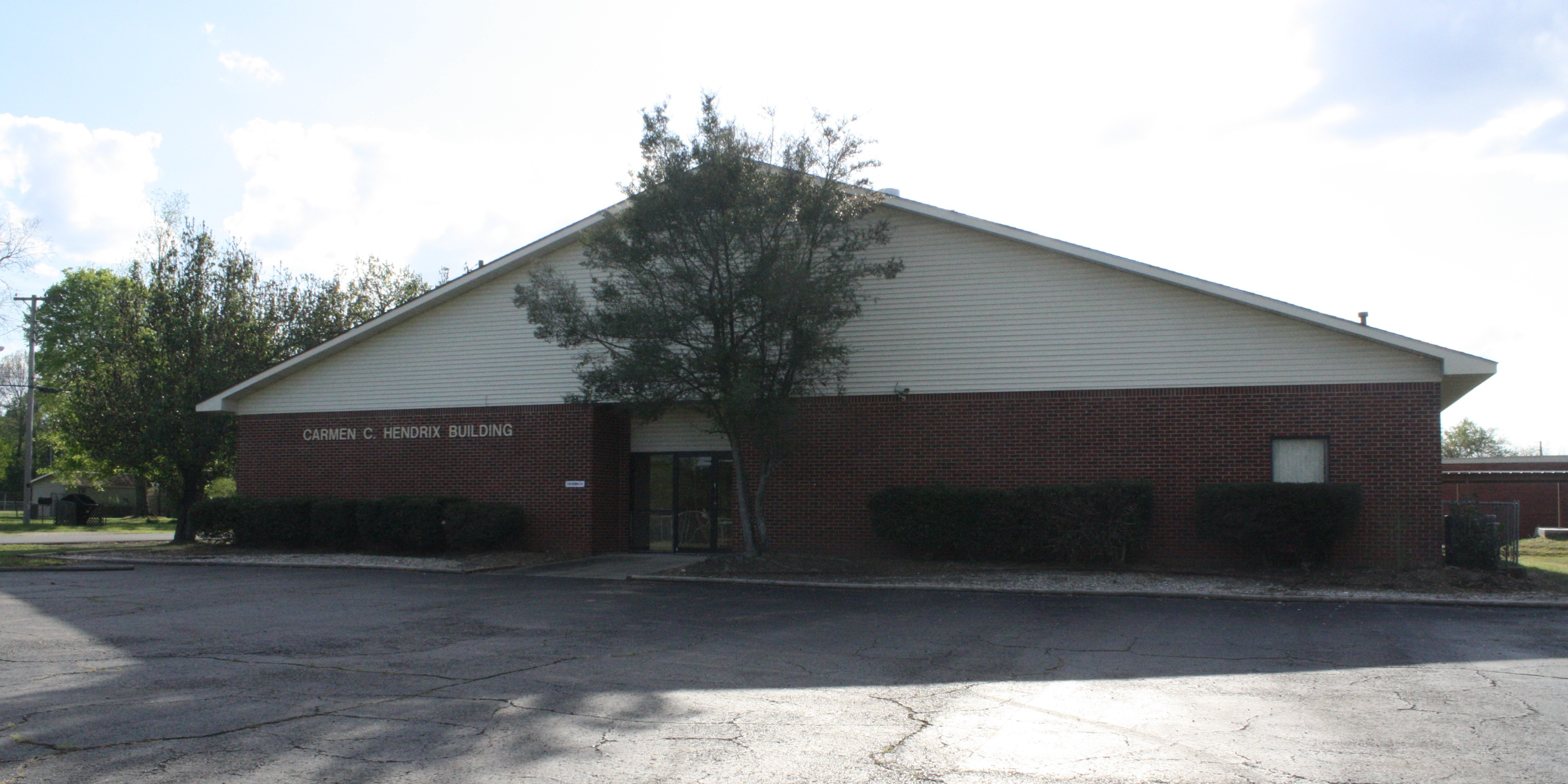
- Carmen C. Hendrix Building

- Location of Delight in Pike County, Arkansas.
- Coordinates: 34°01′45″N 93°30′16″W
- Country: United States
- State: Arkansas
- County: Pike

Area
  - Total: 0.55 sq mi (1.43 km^{2})
  - Land: 0.55 sq mi (1.43 km^{2})
  - Water: 0.0039 sq mi (0.01 km^{2})
- Elevation: 361 ft (110 m)

Population (2020)
  - Total: 288
  - Estimate (2025): 280 ▼
  - Density: 522.3/sq mi (201.65/km^{2})
- Time zone: UTC-6 (Central (CST))
  - Summer (DST): UTC-5 (CDT)
- ZIP code: 71940
- Area code: 870
- FIPS code: 05-18100
- GNIS feature ID: 2404211
- Website: cityofdelight.com

Delight is a town in Pike County, Arkansas, United States. The population was 288 at the 2020 census.

== History ==
Several decades after Pike County was formed and almost seventy years after Arkansas became a state, Delight became an incorporated town. The earliest known inhabitants of the area were the Quapaw Indians, a tribe of the great Dakotas who at one time had a population of many thousands. By the end of the eighteenth century, white settlers had begun making their homes near the banks of Wolf Creek. Some of the earliest residents of the area were the Kirkhams, Kelleys, Dixons, Dosses, Carpenters, Dosseys, Mobleys, Wards, Greens, Lambs, Reeves, Griffins, Clingmans, Wilsons, and Hancocks. On January 18, 1832, a post office was granted and called "Wolf Creek". In the 1833 Territorial Papers of the United States proposals for mail contracts in Arkansas Territory, Wolf Creek was identified as a mail stop between Little Rock and Hempstead County Courthouse, which was in Washington at that time. The Wolf Creek post office was listed again in 1834, and the amount of postage from the Wolf Creek post office was $13.73 for that year.

On August 21, 1873, Samuel Hasley purchased almost 43 acres of land from the United States for $1.25 an acre. This acreage covers the present site of Delight. A few years later the land was sold to S. B. Dixon and wife, Nancy, who in turn sold it to Abner H. Hancock for $500. On January 4, 1853, he deeded it to David Mobley for the consideration of $700. This land remained in the Mobley family until 1860 when the heirs to David Mobley, then deceased, granted to convey their rights, titles, and interest to William H. Kirkham, his son in law, for the sum of $800. On December 13, 1895, Southwestern Arkansas, an Indian Territory Railroad Company, paid William H. Kirkham $1.00 for a 100-foot right-of-way and other territory through which their railroad was to be built. As the people of the community learned of the coming of the railroad, excitement grew. The prospects of train service brought new life into the community. A town site was provided and the location of the railroad station was selected. As William H. Kirkham, now a Confederate Army Veteran, had generously donated the town site, it was decided that he should choose the town's name. Kirkham said, "This is such a delightful place to live, we shall call the town Delight." The Pike County Court Record B, page 413, contains the proceedings for the incorporation Delight. On July 25, 1904, the petition for incorporation was read before the court and properly filed. It was recorded on September 9, 1905, with John Brock as the first mayor.

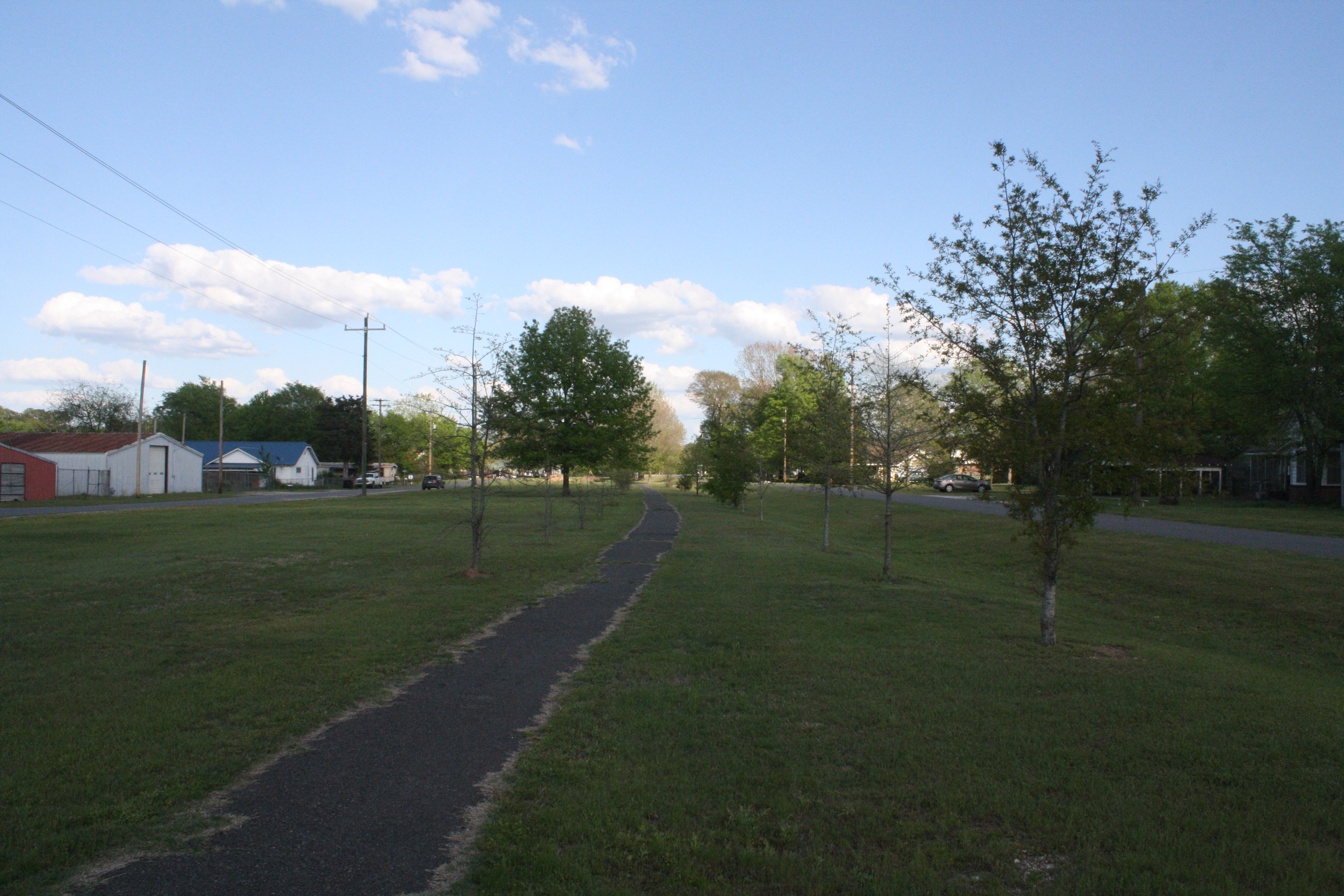
The former railroad right-of-way has been turned into a park

The coming of the new railroad brought new industry to Delight. R.B. F Key was interested in the timber business and he saw in the forests of virgin timber a veritable gold mine. He secured a site and proceeded to build a saw mill and planer. Early on a morning 1897 the whistle sounded and the wheels began to turn. Lumber was shipped far and near on the railroad but it was also used to build new houses for the residents of the Delight. Business boomed and so did Delight. Near the town, large deposits of gravel offered more industry. So carloads of gravel was also shipped over the new railroad. Key built a large hotel to accommodate the drummers who descended on the town to sell their wares to the rapidly expanding business district. Some of the early merchants were A. E. Westbrook, C. E. Reid, Bose and Jim Bratton, and the Geiser brothers. O. L Mckinney owned and operated the first cold drink stand. As the town grew, a need for a doctor arose. Antoine, a neighboring town 5 miles away, had shared its Kirkham with the community of Delight for a number of years. So Rice was the first to become the town's physician in 1903. After Rice, Rodgers moved to Delight from Mississippi and practiced medicine for several years. Other doctors who gave unstintingly of their time were Walls, Newt Slaughter, Joe Thomasson, W. P. Hemby, and B. S. Stokes. brother, Hosea, operated a drug store. Ed Brewer became the town's first post master.

About the year 1909 Key sold his saw mill and planer to the Blakely brothers and for six to seven years they continued to operate the mill. But the forest had been mostly cut over and the saw mill business could no longer be profitable to the owners. So the business was closed and people became interested in other work. Farming was one of the principal occupations with cotton as the leading crop. By 1919 Delight was a very good cotton market. The twenties were very prosperous years. Money was plentiful and credit was easy. When the depression hit in 1930, Delight, like, all other towns and cities across the nation, became paralyzed with fear. But they never gave up hope for a better day. And that day came in 1936, when the Ozan Lumber Company of Prescott began construction of a large saw mill and planer and by January 1937 the wheels of industry began to turn again for the city. New housing projects were completed and for the second time Delight became a thriving mill town.

== Demographics ==
Historical population
Census	Pop.	Note	%±
1910	539		—
1920	391		−27.5%
1930	408		4.3%
1940	481		17.9%
1950	574		19.3%
1960	446		−22.3%
1970	439		−1.6%
1980	431		−1.8%
1990	311		−27.8%
2000	311		0.0%
2010	279		−10.3%
2020	288		3.2%
2025 (est.)	280	▼	−2.8%
U.S. Decennial Census; 2014 Estimate

As of the census of 1990, there were 311 people, 135 households, and 85 families residing in the town. The population density was 682.4 inhabitants per square mile (263.5/km^{2}). There were 168 housing units at an average density of 368.6 per square mile (142.3/km^{2}). The racial makeup of the town was 95.50% White, 0.96% Black or African American, 3.22% Native American and 0.32% Asian. 0.32% of the population were Hispanic or Latino of any race.

There were 135 households, out of which 28.9% had children under the age of 18 living with them, 53.3% were married couples living together, 9.6% had a female householder with no husband present, and 36.3% were non-families. 34.1% of all households were made up of individuals, and 21.5% had someone living alone who was 65 years of age or older. The average household size was 2.30 and the average family size was 2.97.

In the town the population was spread out, with 26.0% under the age of 18, 6.8% from 18 to 24, 24.8% from 25 to 44, 21.9% from 45 to 64, and 20.6% who were 65 years of age or older. The median age was 39 years. For every 100 females, there were 82.9 males. For every 100 females age 18 and over, there were 79.7 males.

The median income for a household was $23,977, and the median income for a family was $33,125. Males had a median income of $26,375 versus $20,938 for females. The per capita income for the city was $12,749. About 17.6% of families and 26.0% of the population were below the poverty line, including 37.8% of those under age 18 and 29.4% of those age 65 or over.

== Education ==
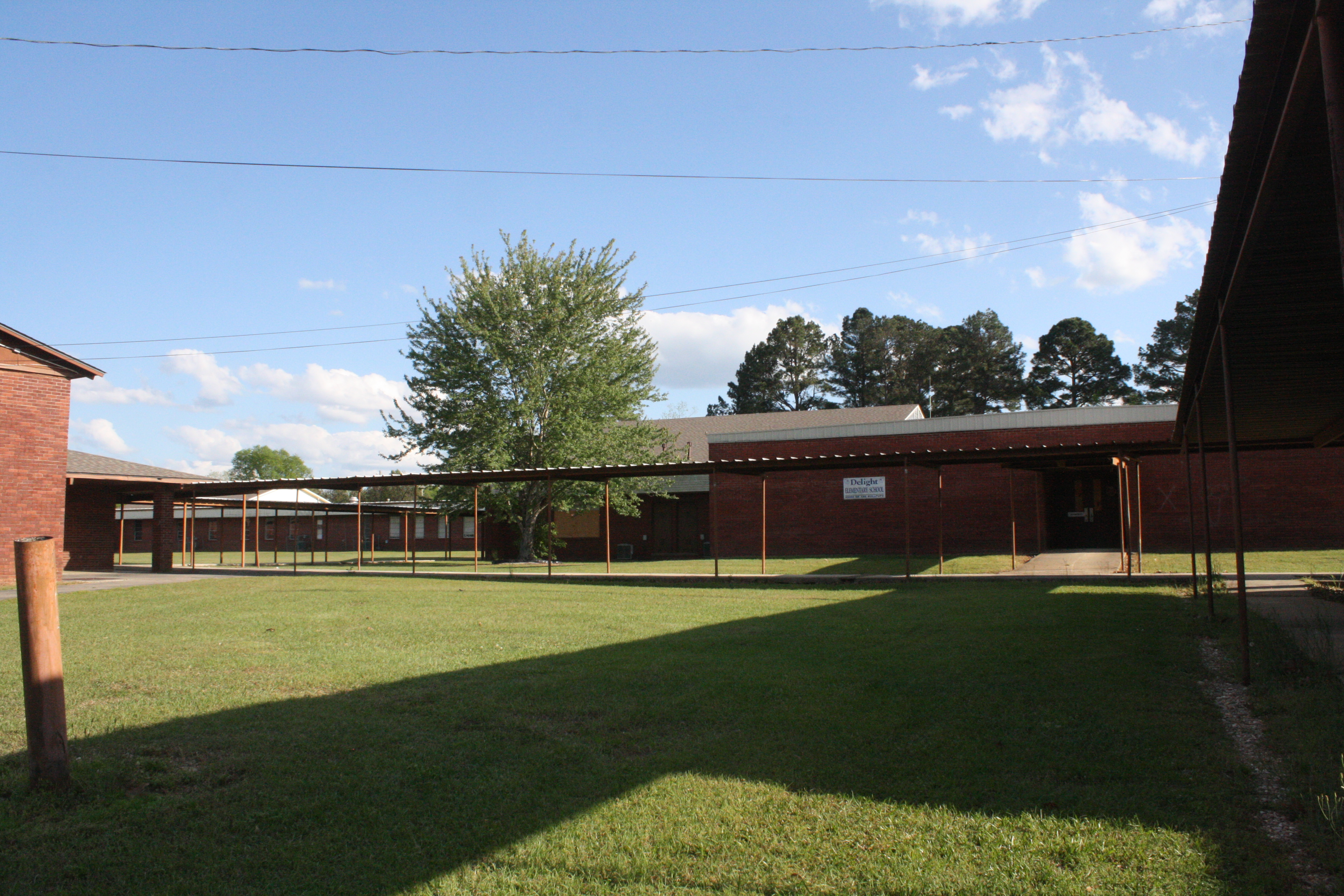
Former Delight Elementary School

The community is in the South Pike County School District, which operates Murfreesboro Elementary School and Murfreesboro High School.

It was previously a part of the Delight School District, which operated Delight Elementary and Delight High School. On July 1, 2010, the Delight district merged with the Murfreesboro School District to form the South Pike County School District.

The Delight High School mascot was a bulldog and colors are blue and gold. Throughout Delight's history basketball has always been a huge part of the community. With a winning tradition the Bulldogs captured state basketball titles in '55,'64, and '94. Along with basketball titles the Lady Bulldogs cheerleaders won the state cheer title in '02.

Delight High School was suddenly closed in 2010 for lack of students. Nowadays, some students attend Murfreesboro High, located 12 miles away while others go to Blevins High School, which is 15 miles away.

The community historically had a Rosenwald School. In 1965, Delight High School integrated with Simmons High School in Okolona.

== Notable people ==
- Jimmie Lou Fisher, Arkansas' longest-serving state treasurer.
- Ralphie May, comedian, described spending childhood summers at his grandfather's farm in Delight in his act.
- Scott Reeves, actor and country music singer
- Gus Wingfield, former Arkansas state treasurer and Arkansas state auditor; moved to Delight as a child.
