= Murfreesboro, Arkansas =

- City
- Location of Murfreesboro in Pike County, Arkansas.
- Coordinates: 34°03′38″N 93°41′40″W
- Country: United States
- State: Arkansas
- County: Pike

Area
  - Total: 3.71 sq mi (9.61 km^{2})
  - Land: 3.68 sq mi (9.52 km^{2})
  - Water: 0.035 sq mi (0.09 km^{2})
- Elevation: 345 ft (105 m)

Population (2020)
  - Total: 1,495
  - Estimate (2025): 1,443 ▼
  - Density: 406.7/sq mi (157.01/km^{2})
- Time zone: UTC-6 (Central (CST))
  - Summer (DST): UTC-5 (CDT)
- ZIP code: 71958
- Area code: 870
- FIPS code: 05-48290
- GNIS feature ID: 2404341
- Website: murfreesboroar.gov

Murfreesboro is a city in and the county seat of Pike County, Arkansas, United States. As of the 2020 census, Murfreesboro had a population of 1,495. The Crater of Diamonds State Park is located approximately 1 mile southeast of the city.

== History ==
Located in Murfreesboro is the 1,000-year-old Ka-Do-Ha Indian Village and museum dedicated to it, which offers a field that can be excavated for authentic arrowheads.

== Geography ==
According to the United States Census Bureau, the city has a total area of 2.0 square miles (5.2 km^{2}), all land.

=== Climate ===
Climate data for Murfreesboro, Arkansas (1991–2020 normals, extremes 1970–present)
Month	Jan	Feb	Mar	Apr	May	Jun	Jul	Aug	Sep	Oct	Nov	Dec	Year
Record high °F (°C)	78 (26)	86 (30)	86 (30)	93 (34)	95 (35)	104 (40)	108 (42)	109 (43)	108 (42)	92 (33)	86 (30)	80 (27)	109 (43)
Mean maximum °F (°C)	70.4 (21.3)	73.9 (23.3)	80.3 (26.8)	84.1 (28.9)	88.1 (31.2)	92.8 (33.8)	97.3 (36.3)	98.0 (36.7)	94.3 (34.6)	87.2 (30.7)	77.6 (25.3)	71.1 (21.7)	99.5 (37.5)
Mean daily maximum °F (°C)	51.4 (10.8)	56.0 (13.3)	64.3 (17.9)	72.0 (22.2)	78.9 (26.1)	86.0 (30.0)	90.4 (32.4)	90.7 (32.6)	84.9 (29.4)	74.3 (23.5)	62.5 (16.9)	53.8 (12.1)	72.1 (22.3)
Daily mean °F (°C)	40.0 (4.4)	43.8 (6.6)	51.4 (10.8)	59.0 (15.0)	67.6 (19.8)	75.2 (24.0)	79.1 (26.2)	78.9 (26.1)	72.5 (22.5)	61.1 (16.2)	50.1 (10.1)	42.4 (5.8)	60.1 (15.6)
Mean daily minimum °F (°C)	28.6 (−1.9)	31.6 (−0.2)	38.5 (3.6)	46.0 (7.8)	56.3 (13.5)	64.3 (17.9)	67.7 (19.8)	67.0 (19.4)	60.0 (15.6)	47.8 (8.8)	37.7 (3.2)	30.9 (−0.6)	48.0 (8.9)
Mean minimum °F (°C)	14.1 (−9.9)	19.4 (−7.0)	23.2 (−4.9)	31.1 (−0.5)	42.0 (5.6)	55.6 (13.1)	61.2 (16.2)	60.1 (15.6)	47.1 (8.4)	32.3 (0.2)	23.6 (−4.7)	17.6 (−8.0)	11.4 (−11.4)
Record low °F (°C)	−1 (−18)	−13 (−25)	13 (−11)	22 (−6)	33 (1)	46 (8)	52 (11)	51 (11)	33 (1)	21 (−6)	9 (−13)	−2 (−19)	−13 (−25)
Average precipitation inches (mm)	4.24 (108)	4.39 (112)	5.90 (150)	5.99 (152)	6.41 (163)	3.80 (97)	4.50 (114)	3.86 (98)	4.13 (105)	5.22 (133)	4.65 (118)	5.26 (134)	58.35 (1,482)
Average snowfall inches (cm)	0.8 (2.0)	0.4 (1.0)	0.1 (0.25)	0.0 (0.0)	0.0 (0.0)	0.0 (0.0)	0.0 (0.0)	0.0 (0.0)	0.0 (0.0)	0.0 (0.0)	0.0 (0.0)	0.1 (0.25)	1.4 (3.6)
Average precipitation days (≥ 0.01 in)	9.2	8.8	9.8	9.0	9.0	7.6	7.3	6.6	6.3	7.8	8.6	9.2	99.2
Average snowy days (≥ 0.1 in)	0.2	0.2	0.1	0.0	0.0	0.0	0.0	0.0	0.0	0.0	0.0	0.0	0.5
Source: NOAA

== Demographics ==
Historical population
Census	Pop.	Note	%±
1880	84		—
1890	159		89.3%
1900	200		25.8%
1910	516		158.0%
1920	730		41.5%
1930	733		0.4%
1940	835		13.9%
1950	1,079		29.2%
1960	1,096		1.6%
1970	1,350		23.2%
1980	1,883		39.5%
1990	1,542		−18.1%
2000	1,764		14.4%
2010	1,641		−7.0%
2020	1,495		−8.9%
2025 (est.)	1,443	▼	−3.5%
U.S. Decennial Census

=== 2020 census ===
Murfreesboro racial composition
Race	Number	Percentage
White (non-Hispanic)	1,269	84.88%
Black or African American (non-Hispanic)	75	5.02%
Native American	13	0.87%
Asian	2	0.13%
Other/Mixed	82	5.48%
Hispanic or Latino	54	3.61%

As of the 2020 census, Murfreesboro had a population of 1,495. The median age was 45.2 years. 20.2% of residents were under the age of 18 and 22.2% were 65 years of age or older. For every 100 females, there were 95.4 males, and for every 100 females age 18 and over, there were 90.9 males age 18 and over.

0.0% of residents lived in urban areas, while 100.0% lived in rural areas.

There were 621 households and 511 families in Murfreesboro, of which 29.5% had children under the age of 18 living in them. Of all households, 44.1% were married-couple households, 17.6% were households with a male householder and no spouse or partner present, and 32.4% were households with a female householder and no spouse or partner present. About 32.0% of all households were made up of individuals and 16.9% had someone living alone who was 65 years of age or older.

There were 742 housing units, of which 16.3% were vacant. The homeowner vacancy rate was 2.1% and the rental vacancy rate was 10.0%.

=== 2000 census ===
As of the census of 2000, there were 1,764 people, 732 households, and 485 families residing in the city. The population density was 906.5 inhabitants per square mile (350.0/km^{2}). There were 830 housing units at an average density of 426.5 per square mile (164.7/km^{2}). The racial makeup of the city was 89.23% White, 7.31% Black or African American, 1.08% Native American, 0.11% Asian, 0.91% from other races, and 1.36% from two or more races. 1.36% of the population were Hispanic or Latino of any race.

There were 732 households, out of which 30.2% had children under the age of 18 living with them, 51.5% were married couples living together, 12.3% had a female householder with no husband present, and 33.7% were non-families. 31.1% of all households were made up of individuals, and 18.7% had someone living alone who was 65 years of age or older. The average household size was 2.32 and the average family size was 2.89.

In the city, the population was spread out, with 24.4% under the age of 18, 6.3% from 18 to 24, 26.0% from 25 to 44, 22.4% from 45 to 64, and 20.9% who were 65 years of age or older. The median age was 40 years. For every 100 females, there were 85.9 males. For every 100 females age 18 and over, there were 81.7 males.

The median income for a household in the city was $26,806, and the median income for a family was $33,456. Males had a median income of $26,300 versus $18,523 for females. The per capita income for the city was $17,124. About 11.0% of families and 14.1% of the population were below the poverty line, including 13.7% of those under age 18 and 16.3% of those age 65 or over.

== Education ==
Public education for elementary and secondary school students is provided by South Pike County School District, which includes Murfreesboro High School, serving grades 7 through 12.

On July 1, 2010, the Murfreesboro School District and the Delight School District merged to form the South Pike County School District. The Murfreesboro district absorbed the Delight district and then changed its name to South Pike County School District.

== See also ==
- Quicksilver Rush
