= Daisy, Arkansas =

- Town
- Location of Daisy in Pike County, Arkansas.
- Coordinates: 34°14′06″N 93°44′45″W
- Country: United States
- State: Arkansas
- County: Pike

Area
  - Total: 1.45 sq mi (3.76 km^{2})
  - Land: 1.14 sq mi (2.95 km^{2})
  - Water: 0.31 sq mi (0.81 km^{2})
- Elevation: 571 ft (174 m)

Population (2020)
  - Total: 88
  - Estimate (2025): 82 ▼
  - Density: 77.2/sq mi (29.79/km^{2})
- Time zone: UTC-6 (Central (CST))
  - Summer (DST): UTC-5 (CDT)
- FIPS code: 05-17140
- GNIS feature ID: 2406349

Daisy is a town in Pike County, Arkansas, United States. Its population is 88 as of the 2020 census. Daisy is also the home of Daisy State Park.

== Geography ==
According to the United States Census Bureau, the town has a total area of 3.7 km^{2} (1.4 sq mi), of which 3.0 km^{2} (1.2 sq mi) is land and 0.8 km^{2} (0.31 sq mi) (20.14%) is water.

Daisy also includes a portion of Lake Greeson.

== Demographics ==
Historical population
Census	Pop.	Note	%±
1910	136		—
1920	130		−4.4%
1930	100		−23.1%
1940	82		−18.0%
1950	74		−9.8%
1960	86		16.2%
1970	100		16.3%
1980	177		77.0%
1990	122		−31.1%
2000	118		−3.3%
2010	115		−2.5%
2020	88		−23.5%
2025 (est.)	82	▼	−6.8%
U.S. Decennial Census; 2014 Estimate

As per the 2000 census, there are 118 people, 52 households, and 34 families residing in the town. The population density was 39.6 people/km^{2} (103 people/mi^{2}). There were 119 housing units at an average density of 40.0 units/km^{2} (104 units/mi^{2}). The racial makeup of the town was 96.61% White, 1.69% Black or African American, and 1.69% from two or more races.

There were 52 households, out of which 17.3% had children under the age of 18 living with them, 59.6% were married couples living together, 7.7% had a female householder with no husband present, and 32.7% were non-families. 25.0% of all households were made up of individuals, and 7.7% had someone living alone who was 65 years of age or older. The average household size was 2.27 and the average family size was 2.71.

In the town, the population was spread out, with 15.3% under the age of 18, 5.9% from 18 to 24, 28.0% from 25 to 44, 33.9% from 45 to 64, and 16.9% who were 65 years of age or older. The median age was 45 years. For every 100 females, there were 84.4 males. For every 100 females age 18 and over, there were 85.2 males.

The median income for a household in the town was $26,607, and the median income for a family was $26,250. Males had a median income of $23,125 versus $13,750 for females. The per capita income for the town was $11,896. There were 17.1% of families and 27.4% of the population living below the poverty line, including 33.3% of under eighteens and none of those over 64.

== Education ==
It is in the Kirby School District.
