= Pike County, Arkansas =

County in Arkansas, United States

- County
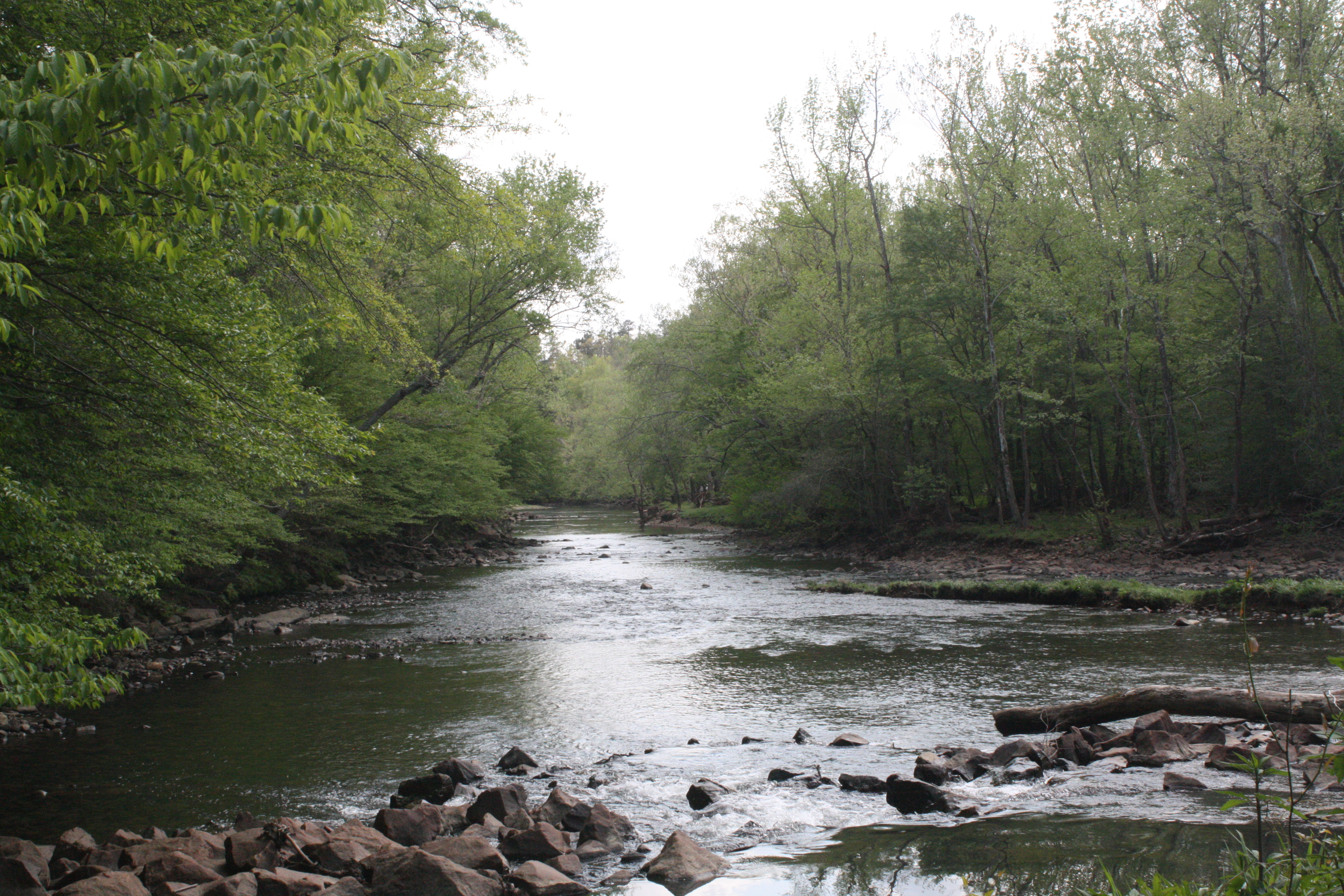
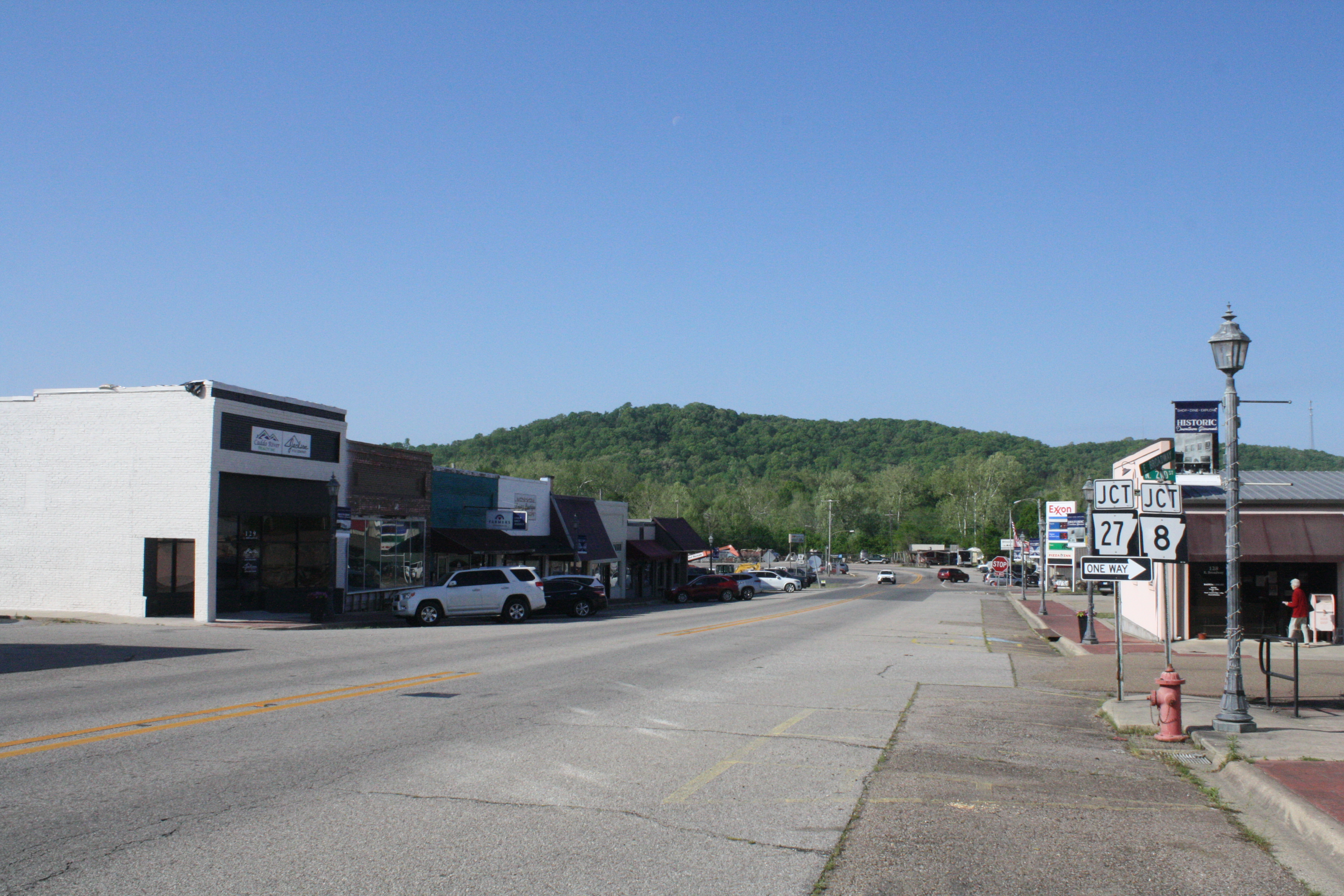
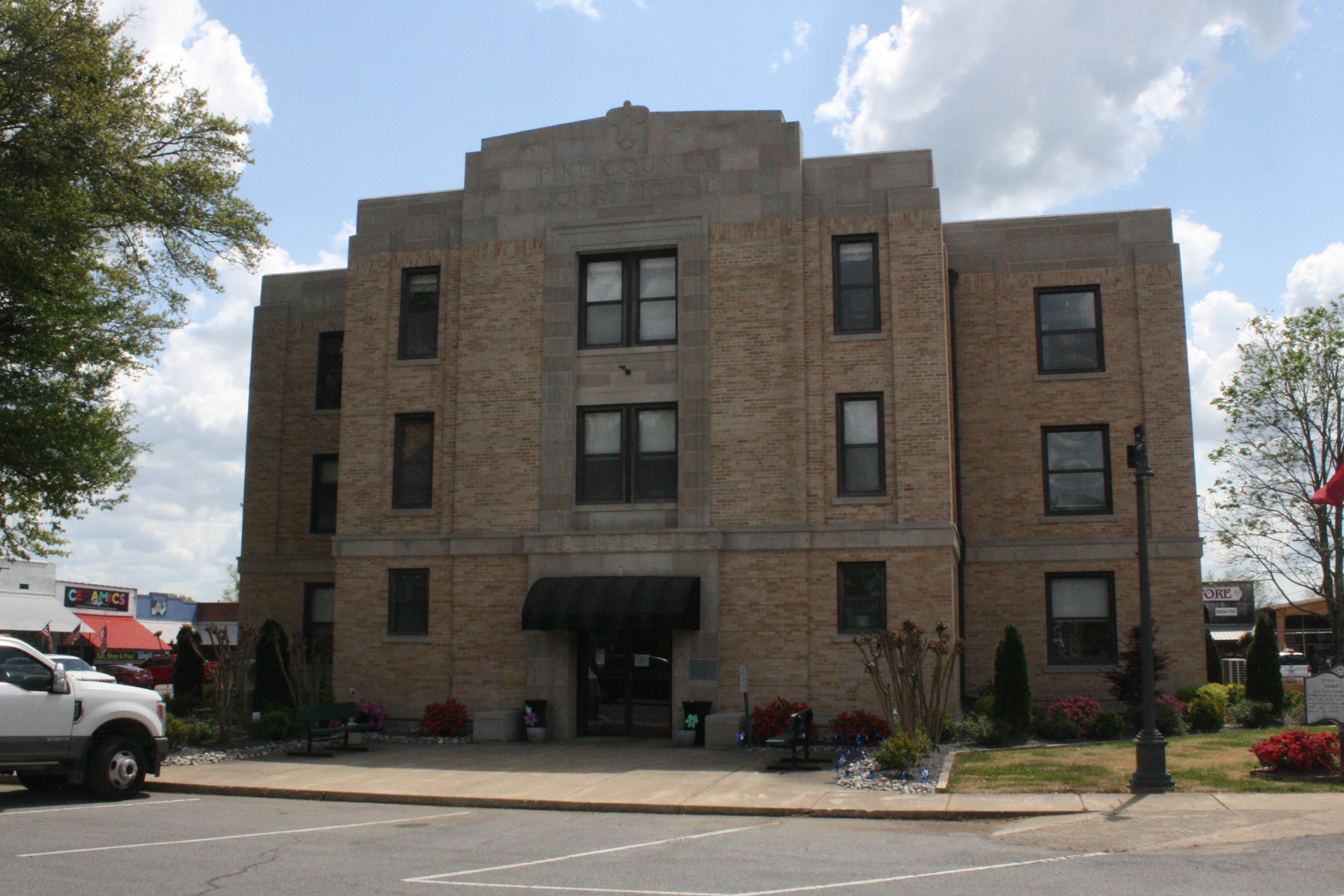
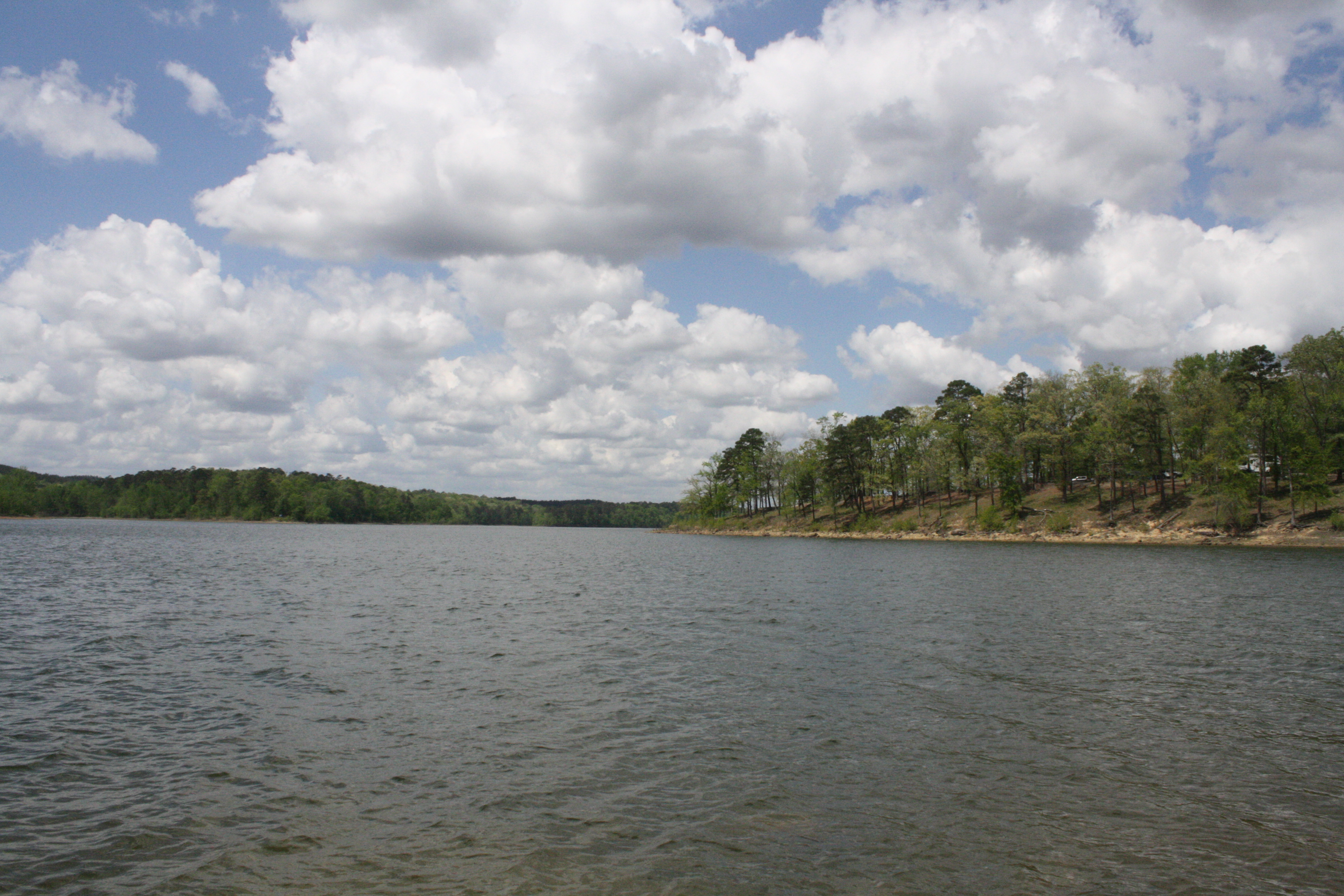
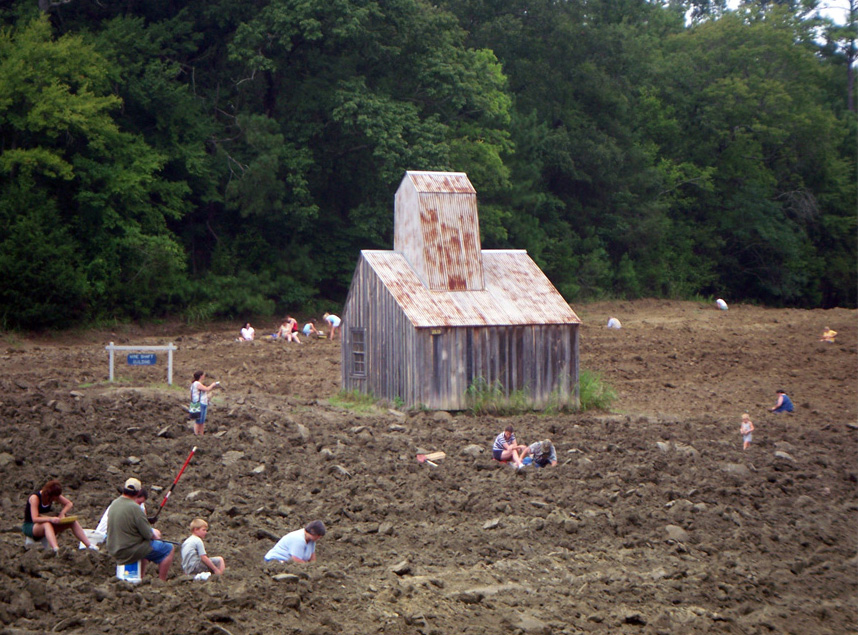
- Little Missouri River Downtown Glenwood, Arkansas Pike County Courthouse Daisy State Park Crater of Diamonds State Park

- Location within the U.S. state of Arkansas
- Coordinates: 34°10′00″N 93°39′27″W
- Country: United States
- State: Arkansas
- Founded: November 1, 1833
- Named for: Zebulon Pike
- Seat: Murfreesboro
- Largest city: Glenwood

Area
  - Total: 614 sq mi (1,590 km^{2})
  - Land: 601 sq mi (1,560 km^{2})
  - Water: 14 sq mi (36 km^{2})

Population (2020)
  - Total: 10,171
  - Estimate (2025): 9,964 ▼
  - Density: 16.9/sq mi (6.53/km^{2})
- Time zone: UTC−6 (Central)
  - Summer (DST): UTC−5 (CDT)
- Congressional district: 4th
- Website: pikecountyar.org

Pike County is a county located in the U.S. state of Arkansas. As of the 2020 census, the population was 10,171. The county seat is Murfreesboro. Pike County is Arkansas's 25th county, formed on November 1, 1833, and named for Lieutenant Zebulon Pike, the explorer for whom Pikes Peak is named. It is an alcohol prohibition or dry county.

== History ==
The first known residents of the area now considered Pike County were Native Americans. The Quapaw tribe was prominent in the area, as well as the Kadohadacho, and Cahinnio tribes. Expeditions led by Hernando de Soto and Sieur de La Salle passed through the area. Around 1800, the Kadohadocho tribe migrated to Texas to avoid further repeated attacks by the Osage, who would venture in from the Oklahoma area.

Pike County was part of the Louisiana Purchase of 1803, and on November 1, 1833, Pike County was created out of Clark and Hempstead counties by the Arkansas territorial legislature and named after Zebulon Pike. A post office was established in what is now Murfreesboro, with the town itself receiving its name from some of its first residents having originated from Murfreesboro, Tennessee. Until it was officially named, Murfreesboro had been referred to as "Forks of the Missouri" or "Three Forks.” Much of the county's documented history was destroyed in the court house fires of 1855 and 1895.

During the Civil War, Pike County men formed two full companies for service in regiments formed in Montgomery County, in the Confederate Army, with the most active being the 4th Arkansas Infantry Regiment, and the county was firmly in support of the Confederate States of America. In 1864, Murfreesboro served as a winter quarters for the Confederate regiments assigned to that area, with Union Army regiments wintering just eighteen miles away in and around Antoine.

In 1900, Martin White Greeson, who owned property in Pike County and also owned and operated the Murfreesboro-Nashville Southwest RailRoad, began campaigning for a dam on the Little Missouri River to alleviate flooding. It was not until 1941 that the project was approved, and construction began on June 1, 1948, and was completed on July 12, 1951. The lake created by the dam was named Lake Greeson in Greeson's honor.

In the early 20th century, Rosboro, Arkansas was the headquarters of one of the state's most productive lumber mills and received its name from Thomas Whitaker Rosborough, owner of the lumber company. That company, originating in Rosboro, eventually moved to Springfield, Oregon, where today it is one of the largest forest product producers in the U.S., and it operates under the name of the "Rosboro Timber Company.”

During World War II, Murfreesboro was used as a site to house and work German prisoners of war.

Since the late 19th century, the county's main source of employment has been the timber industry.

== Geography ==
According to the U.S. Census Bureau, the county has a total area of 614 square miles (1,590 km^{2}), of which 601 square miles (1,560 km^{2}) is land and 14 square miles (36 km^{2}) (2.2%) is water.

=== Major highways ===
- U.S. Highway 70
- Highway 8
- Highway 19
- Highway 26
- Highway 27
- Highway 29
- Highway 84
- Highway 195
- Highway 301
- Highway 369
- Highway 379

=== Adjacent counties ===
- Montgomery County (north)
- Clark County (east)
- Nevada County (southeast)
- Hempstead County (south)
- Howard County (west)
- Polk County (northwest)

=== National protected area ===
- Ouachita National Forest (part)

== Demographics ==
Historical population
Census	Pop.	Note	%±
1840	969		—
1850	1,861		92.1%
1860	4,025		116.3%
1870	3,788		−5.9%
1880	6,345		67.5%
1890	8,537		34.5%
1900	10,301		20.7%
1910	12,565		22.0%
1920	12,397		−1.3%
1930	11,792		−4.9%
1940	11,786		−0.1%
1950	10,032		−14.9%
1960	7,864		−21.6%
1970	8,711		10.8%
1980	10,373		19.1%
1990	10,086		−2.8%
2000	11,303		12.1%
2010	11,291		−0.1%
2020	10,171		−9.9%
2025 (est.)	9,964	▼	−2.0%
U.S. Decennial Census; 1790–1960 1900–1990; 1990–2000 2010–2016

=== 2020 census ===
As of the 2020 census, the county had a population of 10,171. The median age was 44.1 years. 22.4% of residents were under the age of 18 and 20.9% of residents were 65 years of age or older. For every 100 females there were 98.4 males, and for every 100 females age 18 and over there were 97.5 males age 18 and over.

The racial makeup of the county was 85.4% White, 2.4% Black or African American, 0.9% American Indian and Alaska Native, 0.2% Asian, <0.1% Native Hawaiian and Pacific Islander, 5.0% from some other race, and 6.2% from two or more races. Hispanic or Latino residents of any race comprised 8.2% of the population.

<0.1% of residents lived in urban areas, while 100.0% lived in rural areas.

There were 4,128 households in the county, of which 30.1% had children under the age of 18 living in them. Of all households, 51.2% were married-couple households, 18.9% were households with a male householder and no spouse or partner present, and 24.5% were households with a female householder and no spouse or partner present. About 28.5% of all households were made up of individuals and 14.6% had someone living alone who was 65 years of age or older.

There were 5,289 housing units, of which 22.0% were vacant. Among occupied housing units, 76.3% were owner-occupied and 23.7% were renter-occupied. The homeowner vacancy rate was 2.0% and the rental vacancy rate was 11.4%.

=== 2000 census ===
As of the 2000 census, there were 11,303 people, 4,504 households, and 3,265 families residing in the county. The population density was 19 people per square mile (7.3 people/km^{2}). There were 5,536 housing units at an average density of 9 units per square mile (3.5 units/km^{2}). The racial makeup of the county was 92.04% White, 3.47% Black or African American, 0.65% Native American, 0.16% Asian, 0.02% Pacific Islander, 2.60% from other races, and 1.07% from two or more races. 3.57% of the population were Hispanic or Latino of any race.

There were 4,504 households, out of which 32.10% had children under the age of 18 living with them, 60.90% were married couples living together, 8.30% had a female householder with no husband present, and 27.50% were non-families. 25.20% of all households were made up of individuals, and 13.40% had someone living alone who was 65 years of age or older. The average household size was 2.47 and the average family size was 2.94.

In the county, the population was spread out, with 24.90% under the age of 18, 7.30% from 18 to 24, 26.40% from 25 to 44, 24.50% from 45 to 64, and 17.00% who were 65 years of age or older. The median age was 39 years. For every 100 females there were 97.20 males. For every 100 females age 18 and over, there were 93.40 males.

The median income for a household in the county was $27,695, and the median income for a family was $32,883. Males had a median income of $27,294 versus $17,266 for females. The per capita income for the county was $15,385. About 12.80% of families and 16.80% of the population were below the poverty line, including 20.80% of those under age 18 and 20.20% of those age 65 or over.

== Government ==
=== Government ===
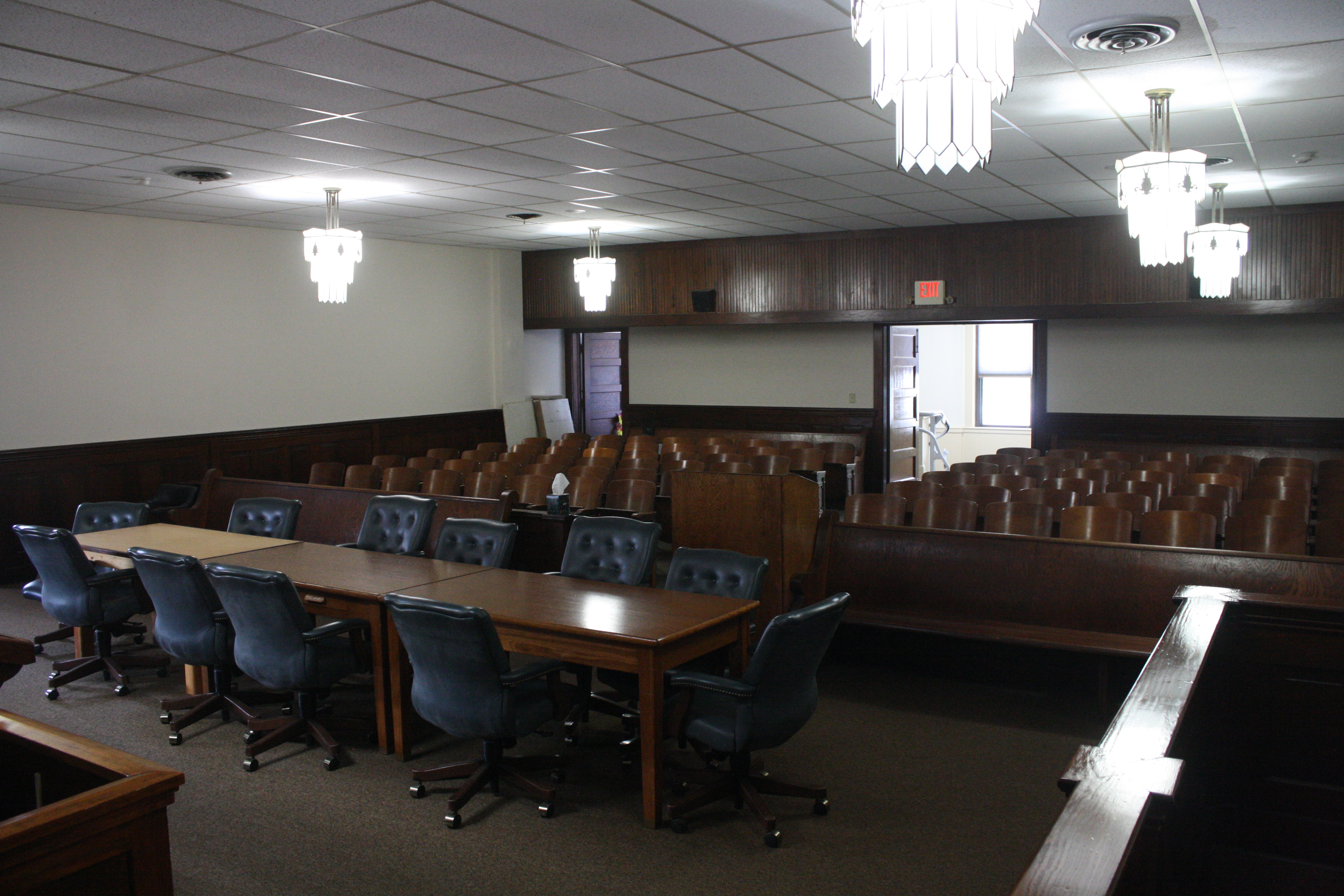
Quorum court meeting room at the Pike County Courthouse

The county government is a constitutional body granted specific powers by the Constitution of Arkansas and the Arkansas Code. The quorum court is the legislative branch of the county government and controls all spending and revenue collection. Representatives are called justices of the peace and are elected from county districts every even-numbered year. The number of districts in a county vary from nine to fifteen, and district boundaries are drawn by the county election commission. The Pike County Quorum Court has nine members. Presiding over quorum court meetings is the county judge, who serves as the chief operating officer of the county. The county judge is elected at-large and does not vote in quorum court business, although capable of vetoing quorum court decisions.

Pike County, Arkansas Elected countywide officials
Position	Officeholder	Party
County Judge	Eddie Howard	Republican
County Clerk	Randee Edwards	Republican
Circuit Clerk	Sabrina Williams	Republican
Sheriff/Collector	Travis Hill	Republican
Treasurer	Loletia Rather	Republican
Assessor	Staci Stewart	Republican
Coroner	Dawn Friedman	Republican

The composition of the Quorum Court following the 2024 elections is 6 Republicans and 3 Democrats. Justices of the Peace (members) of the Quorum Court following the elections are:

- District 1: Randy Lamb (R)
- District 2: Robbie Crocker (R)
- District 3: Seth Henry Kirkham (R)
- District 4: Leotis Snowden (D)
- District 5: Jerry Fendley (D)
- District 6: Kip Holbrook (R)
- District 7: Richard Mohlenhoff (R)
- District 8: John J. Plyler Jr. (R)
- District 9: Paul S. Baker (D)

Additionally, the townships of Pike County are entitled to elect their own respective constables, as set forth by the Constitution of Arkansas. Constables are largely of historical significance as they were used to keep the peace in rural areas when travel was more difficult. The township constables as of the 2024 elections are:

- Missouri: Ricky Branch (D)

=== Politics ===
Over the past few election cycles Pike County has trended heavily towards the GOP. The last Democrat (as of 2024) to carry this county was Bill Clinton in 1996.

United States presidential election results for Pike County, Arkansas
Year	Republican		Democratic		Third party(ies)	
Year	No.	%	No.	%	No.	%
1896	231	21.04%	864	78.69%	3	0.27%
1900	413	42.19%	566	57.81%	0	0.00%
1904	517	51.19%	432	42.77%	61	6.04%
1908	601	49.96%	568	47.22%	34	2.83%
1912	331	29.45%	603	53.65%	190	16.90%
1916	605	33.93%	1,178	66.07%	0	0.00%
1920	921	50.69%	849	46.73%	47	2.59%
1924	378	31.93%	732	61.82%	74	6.25%
1928	698	47.07%	779	52.53%	6	0.40%
1932	176	10.61%	1,480	89.21%	3	0.18%
1936	283	22.14%	994	77.78%	1	0.08%
1940	424	30.09%	974	69.13%	11	0.78%
1944	405	31.35%	877	67.88%	10	0.77%
1948	256	18.95%	997	73.80%	98	7.25%
1952	742	38.29%	1,163	60.01%	33	1.70%
1956	905	47.56%	985	51.76%	13	0.68%
1960	1,013	48.19%	997	47.43%	92	4.38%
1964	1,241	44.53%	1,531	54.93%	15	0.54%
1968	1,104	33.51%	656	19.91%	1,535	46.59%
1972	2,316	73.69%	798	25.39%	29	0.92%
1976	1,234	30.35%	2,822	69.40%	10	0.25%
1980	1,916	46.77%	2,094	51.11%	87	2.12%
1984	2,665	64.72%	1,443	35.04%	10	0.24%
1988	2,105	55.44%	1,681	44.27%	11	0.29%
1992	1,577	37.26%	2,168	51.23%	487	11.51%
1996	1,401	32.86%	2,362	55.41%	500	11.73%
2000	2,275	57.29%	1,604	40.39%	92	2.32%
2004	2,013	59.79%	1,310	38.91%	44	1.31%
2008	2,727	68.76%	1,089	27.46%	150	3.78%
2012	2,847	75.16%	851	22.47%	90	2.38%
2016	3,150	79.13%	685	17.21%	146	3.67%
2020	3,519	82.88%	644	15.17%	83	1.95%
2024	3,746	85.96%	560	12.85%	52	1.19%

== Attractions ==
- Crater of Diamonds State Park & Water park

== Communities ==
=== Cities ===
- Delight
- Glenwood
- Murfreesboro (county seat)

=== Towns ===
- Antoine
- Daisy
- Nathan
- Pisgah
- Salem

=== Villages ===
- Pike City

=== Census designated place ===
- Kirby
- Newhope

=== Other unincorporated communities ===
- Billstown
- Highland
- Langley
- Lodi
- Rosboro

=== Townships ===
Townships in Arkansas are the divisions of a county. Each township includes unincorporated areas; some may have incorporated cities or towns within part of their boundaries. Arkansas townships have limited purposes in modern times. However, the United States census does list Arkansas population based on townships (sometimes referred to as "county subdivisions" or "minor civil divisions"). Townships are also of value for historical purposes in terms of genealogical research. Each town or city is within one or more townships in an Arkansas county based on census maps and publications. The townships of Pike County are listed below; listed in parentheses are the cities, towns, and/or census-designated places that are fully or partially inside the township.

- Antoine (most of CDP Kirby)
- Brewer
- Clark (Glenwood)
- Eagle (small part of CDP Kirby)
- Missouri (Delight)
- Mountain
- Muddy Fork
- Pike City
- Saline
- Self Creek (Daisy, part of CDP Kirby)
- Thompson (Murfreesboro)
- White
- Wolf Creek (Antoine)

== Notable residents ==
- Former U.S. Representative Thomas Dale Alford was born in Pike County.
- Singer Glen Campbell was born in Billstown, Arkansas, and raised in nearby Delight.
- Former Arkansas State Treasurer and state auditor Gus Wingfield was born in Antoine, Arkansas, and attended school in Delight.

== See also ==
- List of lakes in Pike County, Arkansas
- National Register of Historic Places listings in Pike County, Arkansas
- Quicksilver Rush
