= Stephens High School =

Location
- 315 West Chert Street; Stephens, Arkansas 71764; United States
- Coordinates: 33°24′49″N 93°4′16″W

Information
- School type: Public comprehensive
- Status: Closed
- School district: Stephens School District
- CEEB code: 042345
- NCES School ID: 051287001045
- Teaching staff: 17.65 (on FTE basis)
- Grades: 7–12
- Enrollment: 172 (2010–11)
- Student to teacher ratio: 9.75
- Education system: ADE Smart Core
- Classes offered: Regular (Core), Career Focus, Advanced Placement (AP)
- Colors: Black and gold
- Athletics conference: 1A 7 East (2012–14)
- Mascot: Roadrunner
- Team name: Stephens Roadrunners
- Accreditation: ADE
- Feeder to: Stephens Elementary School
- Affiliation: Arkansas Activities Association

Stephens High School was a comprehensive public high school located in Stephens, Arkansas, United States. The school provided secondary education in grades 7 through 12 for approximately 175 students. It was one of four public high schools in Ouachita County and is the sole high school administered by the Stephens School District.

The roadrunner was the mascot and the school colors were black and gold.

The Stephens school district was dissolved effective July 1, 2014, with portions given to the Camden Fairview School District, the Magnolia School District, and the Nevada School District.

== Academics ==
The Stephens High School and the rest of Stephens School District closed down after the 2013-2014 school year. The students who went to SHS were consolidated to three other schools: Nevada High School in Rosston, Magnolia High School in Magnolia, and Camden-Fairview High School in Camden.

== Athletics ==
The Stephens High School mascot and athletic emblem is the Roadrunner with school colors of black and gold.

The Stephens Roadrunners compete in interscholastic activities within the 1A Classification administered by the Arkansas Activities Association. The Leopards play within the 1A 7 East Conference. The Roadrunners participate in golf (boys/girls), basketball (boys/girls), cheer, baseball, fastpitch softball, and track and field (boys/girls).

== Notable people ==
- Frank Spooner (1955), Louisiana businessman and politician
