= Magnolia High School (Arkansas) =

Location
- 1400 High School Drive; Magnolia, Arkansas 71753; United States; 33°16′45″N 93°13′21″W

Information
- School type: Public
- School district: Magnolia School District
- NCES District ID: 0500044
- CEEB code: 041500
- NCES School ID: 050004400656
- Grades: 9–12
- Enrollment: 807 (2023-2024)
- Colors: Red and white
- Mascot: Panther
- Team name: Magnolia Panthers
- Affiliation: Arkansas Activities Association
- Website: www.magnoliaschools.net/o/mhs

Magnolia High School is a comprehensive public high school in Magnolia, Arkansas, United States that serves grades 9 through 12. It is one of three public high schools in Columbia County and the only high school managed by the Magnolia School District. It serves Magnolia, Village, McNeil, and Waldo.

== History ==
The high school's attendance area expanded due to consolidations in the 20th and 21st centuries. Village School District consolidated into the Magnolia district on July 1, 1986. The Walker School District consolidated into the Magnolia district on July 1, 2004. The Waldo School District consolidated into the Magnolia district on July 1, 2006. The Arkansas Board of Education voted to dissolve the Stephens School District in 2014, and the portion in Columbia County, serving McNeil and the surrounding area, was given to the Magnolia School District.

== Academics ==
=== Curriculum ===
The assumed course of study is the Smart Core curriculum developed by the Arkansas Department of Education. Students may engage in regular and Advanced Placement (AP) coursework and exams prior to graduation. Magnolia has been a charter member and accredited by AdvancED (formerly North Central Association) since 1924.

=== Awards and recognition ===
In 2012, Magnolia School District and its high school were recognized in the AP District of the Year Awards program in the College Board's 3rd Annual Honor Roll that consisted of 539 U.S. public school districts (6 in Arkansas) that simultaneously achieved increases in access to AP® courses for a broader number of students and improved the rate at which their AP students earned scores of 3 or higher on an AP Exam.

== Athletics ==
The Magnolia High School mascot is the Panther with school colors of red and white.

For 2012–14, the Magnolia Panthers participate in the 5A South Conference for interscholastic activities administered by the Arkansas Activities Association (AAA) including baseball, basketball (boys/girls), cheer, dance, cross country, football, golf (boys/girls), softball, and track and field.

The Panthers boys basketball team has captured seven state titles between 1971 and 1997. The boys track and field teams have won six state championships between 1972 and 2011.

== Notable alumni ==
- Billy Joe Daugherty (1970) — Pastor
- Lane Jean — Mayor of Magnolia prior to 2011; state representative from Columbia, Lafayette, and Miller counties since 2011
- James Herbert Jones — Arkansas Auditor of State and National Guard Adjutant General
