= WPS =

WPS may refer to:

== Computing and telecommunications ==
- Wi-Fi Protected Setup, a standard that attempts to automate secure wireless network set up and connection
- .wps, a file extension (including a list of programs using the extension)
- WPS Office, an office suite software developed by Kingsoft
- Nationwide Wireless Priority Service, a system in the United States for prioritizing emergency calls from mobile phones
- Web Processing Service, a web service interface specification from the Open Geo spatial Consortium
- WebSphere Process Server, an IBM service-oriented architecture offering
- Wi-Fi positioning system, a system that calculates the position of a device through nearby Wi-Fi access points
- Workplace Shell, a user interface of the IBM OS/2 operating system
- World Programming System, a development environment for the SAS programming language

== Education in the United States ==
- Walker Public Schools, a defunct school system in Columbia County, Arkansas
- Windermere Preparatory School, a private school in Florida
- Wilton Public School - See Wilton School District (North Dakota)
- Winchester Public Schools (Connecticut)
- Winchester Public Schools (Virginia)
- Winthrop Public Schools (Maine)
- Woodbury Public Schools, New Jersey
- Woodland Public Schools, Oklahoma
- Woodland Public Schools, Washington

== Organizations ==
=== Canada ===
- Windsor Police Service
- Winnipeg Police Service

=== United Kingdom ===
- Workers Party of Scotland, an anti-revisionist political party
- Women's Police Service, a voluntary organisation

=== United States ===
- Western Pipe and Steel Company
- Wisconsin Physicians Service Insurance Corporation, a not-for-profit health insurer
- Wisconsin Public Service, a utility company in northern Wisconsin
- Women's Professional Soccer, an association football league

== Other uses ==
- Women, Peace and Security Index, scores and ranks countries in terms of women's security, justice, and inclusion.
- Welding Procedure Specification
- West Philippine Sea
