= McNeil, Arkansas =

- City
- Location of McNeil in Columbia County, Arkansas.
- Coordinates: 33°20′53″N 93°12′30″W
- Country: United States
- State: Arkansas
- County: Columbia

Area
  - Total: 1.27 sq mi (3.28 km^{2})
  - Land: 1.27 sq mi (3.28 km^{2})
  - Water: 0 sq mi (0.00 km^{2})
- Elevation: 328 ft (100 m)

Population (2020)
  - Total: 381
  - Estimate (2025): 363 ▼
  - Density: 300.5/sq mi (116.02/km^{2})
- Time zone: UTC-6 (Central (CST))
  - Summer (DST): UTC-5 (CDT)
- ZIP code: 71752
- Area code: 870
- FIPS code: 05-43100
- GNIS feature ID: 2405054

McNeil is a town in Columbia County, Arkansas, United States. As of the 2020 census, McNeil had a population of 381. The community was named after William B. McNeil, founder of the College Hill Academy.

== Geography ==
McNeil is located in northern Columbia County 6 miles (10 km) north of downtown Magnolia, the county seat.

According to the United States Census Bureau, the town has a total area of 1.4 square miles (3.5 km^{2}), all land.

Logoly State Park, part of the Arkansas State Parks System, is located just east of McNeil, off Highway 79. Most of Logoly's 368 acres (1.49 km^{2}) comprise a State Natural Area that includes unique plant species and mineral springs.

=== Climate ===
The climate in this area is characterized by hot, humid summers and generally mild to cool winters. According to the Köppen Climate Classification system, McNeil has a humid subtropical climate, abbreviated "Cfa" on climate maps.

== Demographics ==
Historical population
| Census | Pop. | Note | %± |
|---|---|---|---|
| 1890 | 294 | | — |
| 1900 | 260 | | −11.6% |
| 1910 | 482 | | 85.4% |
| 1920 | 448 | | −7.1% |
| 1930 | 460 | | 2.7% |
| 1940 | 694 | | 50.9% |
| 1950 | 597 | | −14.0% |
| 1960 | 746 | | 25.0% |
| 1970 | 684 | | −8.3% |
| 1980 | 725 | | 6.0% |
| 1990 | 686 | | −5.4% |
| 2000 | 662 | | −3.5% |
| 2010 | 516 | | −22.1% |
| 2020 | 381 | | −26.2% |
| 2025 (est.) | 363 | ▼ | −4.7% |
U.S. Decennial Census

=== 2020 Census ===
McNeil, Arkansas – Racial and ethnic composition Note: the US Census treats Hispanic/Latino as an ethnic category. This table excludes Latinos from the racial categories and assigns them to a separate category. Hispanics/Latinos may be of any race.
| Race / Ethnicity (NH = Non-Hispanic) | Pop 2000 | Pop 2010 | Pop 2020 | % 2000 | % 2010 | % 2020 |
|---|---|---|---|---|---|---|
| White alone (NH) | 267 | 229 | 143 | 40.33% | 44.38% | 37.53% |
| Black or African American alone (NH) | 377 | 273 | 214 | 56.95% | 52.91% | 56.17% |
| Native American or Alaska Native alone (NH) | 0 | 1 | 0 | 0.00% | 0.19% | 0.00% |
| Asian alone (NH) | 1 | 0 | 0 | 0.15% | 0.00% | 0.00% |
| Pacific Islander alone (NH) | 0 | 0 | 0 | 0.00% | 0.00% | 0.00% |
| Some Other Race alone (NH) | 0 | 0 | 1 | 0.00% | 0.00% | 0.26% |
| Mixed Race or Multi-Racial (NH) | 8 | 4 | 21 | 1.21% | 0.78% | 5.51% |
| Hispanic or Latino (any race) | 9 | 9 | 2 | 1.36% | 1.74% | 0.52% |
| Total | 662 | 516 | 381 | 100.00% | 100.00% | 100.00% |

As of the census of 2000, there were 662 people, 237 households, and 165 families residing in the city. The population density was 493.4 inhabitants per square mile (190.5/km^{2}). There were 280 housing units at an average density of 208.7 per square mile (80.6/km^{2}). The racial makeup of the city was 40.33% White, 58.31% Black or African American, 0.15% Asian, and 1.21% from two or more races. 1.36% of the population were Hispanic or Latino of any race.

There were 237 households, out of which 35.4% had children under the age of 18 living with them, 43.5% were married couples living together, 21.5% had a female householder with no husband present, and 30.0% were non-families. 26.2% of all households were made up of individuals, and 9.7% had someone living alone who was 65 years of age or older. The average household size was 2.79 and the average family size was 3.34.

In the city, the population was spread out, with 31.1% under the age of 18, 11.2% from 18 to 24, 28.7% from 25 to 44, 17.8% from 45 to 64, and 11.2% who were 65 years of age or older. The median age was 30 years. For every 100 females, there were 97.6 males. For every 100 females age 18 and over, there were 90.8 males.

The median income for a household in the city was $21,136, and the median income for a family was $27,188. Males had a median income of $24,135 versus $16,563 for females. The per capita income for the city was $8,986. About 26.9% of families and 32.4% of the population were below the poverty line, including 43.2% of those under age 18 and 31.5% of those age 65 or over.

== Infrastructure ==
=== Highways ===
- U.S. Highway 79
- Arkansas Highway 98
- Arkansas Highway 98 Business

== Education ==
Students are assigned to the Magnolia School District which operates Magnolia High School.

It was previously in the McNeil School District. On July 1, 2004, it consolidated into the Stephens School District. According to the Stephens school district's attorney, Clay Fendley, there was, in the words of Mike McNeill of the Magnolia Reporter, "bitterness" resulting from the McNeil consolidation.

The Arkansas Board of Education (ABE) voted to dissolve the Stephens School District in 2014, and the portion serving McNeil was given to the Magnolia School District. Before the ABE made its final decision to break up the Stephens district, it was deciding whether to consolidate it entirely with the Nevada School District or divide it into three pieces. McNeil residents favored the split-up proposal because their children could go to school in Magnolia, which is closer to McNeil than Stephens; Magnolia is 6 miles (9.7 km) from McNeil.
