= McNeil School District =

Defunct school district in Arkansas, United States

McNeil School District was a school district headquartered in McNeil, Arkansas.

On July 1, 2004, it consolidated into the Stephens School District. According to the Stephens school district's attorney, Clay Fendley, there was, in the words of Mike McNeill of the Magnolia Reporter, "bitterness" resulting from the McNeil consolidation. The Arkansas Board of Education dissolved the Stephens district in 2013 and gave the portion serving McNeil and the surrounding area to the Magnolia School District.
