= Nevada High School (Arkansas) =

Location
- 6580 US Hwy 278; Rosston, Arkansas 71858; United States; 33°36′17″N 93°22′12″W

Information
- School type: Public comprehensive
- Status: Open
- School district: Nevada School District
- CEEB code: 042183
- NCES School ID: 050003001405
- Teaching staff: 33.63 (on FTE basis)
- Grades: 7–12
- Enrollment: 206 (2023–2024)
- Student to teacher ratio: 6.13
- Education system: ADE Smart Core
- Classes offered: Regular, Advanced Placement (AP)
- Campus type: Rural
- Colors: Blue and gray
- Athletics conference: 1A 7 East (2012–14)
- Sports: Golf, basketball, baseball, softball, track
- Mascot: Blue jay
- Team name: Nevada Blue Jays (& Lady Jays)
- Accreditation: ADE
- Affiliation: Arkansas Activities Association
- Website: www.nevadaschooldistrict.net

Nevada High School (NHS) is an accredited comprehensive public high school located in Rosston, Arkansas, United States. NHS provides secondary education for more than 220 students in grades 7 through 12. It is one of three public high schools in Nevada County and one of two schools administered by the Nevada School District.

Communities in its service area, aside from Rosston, are Bodcaw, Cale, Laneburg, Oak Grove, and Willisville.

== Academics ==
Nevada High School is accredited by the Arkansas Department of Education (ADE). The assumed course of study follows the ADE Smart Core curriculum, which requires students complete at least 22 units prior to graduation. Students complete regular coursework and exams and may take Advanced Placement (AP) courses and exam with the opportunity to receive college credit.

== Athletics ==
The Nevada High School mascot for academic and athletic teams is the blue jay with blue and gray serving as the school colors.

The Nevada Blue Jays compete in interscholastic activities within the 2A Classification, the state's second smallest classification administered by the Arkansas Activities Association. For 2012–14, the Blue Jays play within the 2A 6 Conference. Nevada fields junior varsity and varsity teams including baseball, basketball (boys/girls), and track and field (boys/girls).

- Track and field: The girls track team achieved a state track championship in 1992.
