= Willisville, Arkansas =

- Town
- Location of Willisville in Nevada County, Arkansas.
- Coordinates: 33°31′10″N 93°17′42″W
- Country: United States
- State: Arkansas
- County: Nevada

Area
  - Total: 1.61 sq mi (4.17 km^{2})
  - Land: 1.60 sq mi (4.14 km^{2})
  - Water: 0.012 sq mi (0.03 km^{2})
- Elevation: 348 ft (106 m)

Population (2020)
  - Total: 148
  - Estimate (2025): 146 ▼
  - Density: 92.7/sq mi (35.78/km^{2})
- Time zone: UTC-6 (Central (CST))
  - Summer (DST): UTC-5 (CDT)
- ZIP code: 71864
- Area code: 870
- FIPS code: 05-75770
- GNIS feature ID: 2406892

Willisville is a town in Nevada County, Arkansas, United States. The population was 148 at the 2020 census. It is part of the Hope Micropolitan Statistical Area.

== Geography ==
According to the United States Census Bureau, the town has a total area of 4.1 km^{2} (1.6 mi^{2}), all land.

== Demographics ==
Historical population
Census	Pop.	Note	%±
1980	209		—
1990	196		−6.2%
2000	188		−4.1%
2010	152		−19.1%
2020	148		−2.6%
2025 (est.)	146	▼	−1.4%
U.S. Decennial Census

As of the census of 2000, there were 188 people, 76 households, and 57 families residing in the town. The population density was 45.4/km^{2} (117.5/mi^{2}). There were 85 housing units at an average density of 20.5/km^{2} (53.1/mi^{2}). The racial makeup of the town was 79.26% White, 19.15% Black or African American, 1.06% Native American, and 0.53% from two or more races. 1.60% of the population were Hispanic or Latino of any race.

There were 76 households, out of which 30.3% had children under the age of 18 living with them, 65.8% were married couples living together, 10.5% had a female householder with no husband present, and 23.7% were non-families. 22.4% of all households were made up of individuals, and 9.2% had someone living alone who was 65 years of age or older. The average household size was 2.47 and the average family size was 2.88.

In the town, the population was spread out, with 25.5% under the age of 18, 6.9% from 18 to 24, 22.9% from 25 to 44, 28.2% from 45 to 64, and 16.5% who were 65 years of age or older. The median age was 41 years. For every 100 females, there were 102.2 males. For every 100 females age 18 and over, there were 97.2 males.

The median income for a household in the town was $28,750, and the median income for a family was $36,250. Males had a median income of $36,875 versus $12,188 for females. The per capita income for the town was $12,925. About 13.8% of families and 21.3% of the population were below the poverty line, including 31.1% of those under the age of eighteen and 5.9% of those 65 or over.

== Infrastructure ==
=== Highways ===
- U.S. Highway 371
- Arkansas Highway 32

== Education ==
=== Public Schools ===
Public education for elementary and secondary school students in Willisville is provided by the Nevada School District, which leads to graduation from Nevada High School. As of the 2014–2015 school year, the district encompasses 345.15 square miles (893.9 km2) of land, supports more than 400 students, and employs more than 80 educators and staff at its two schools and district offices

Nevada School District includes the following school facilities:

- Nevada Elementary School, serving kindergarten through grade 6.
- Nevada High School, serving grades 7 through 12.

On July 1, 1985 Willisville School District merged into the Nevada County School District.

== Notable person ==
- Joyce Elliott, Arkansas Senator, 33rd District.
