= Stephens, Arkansas =

- City
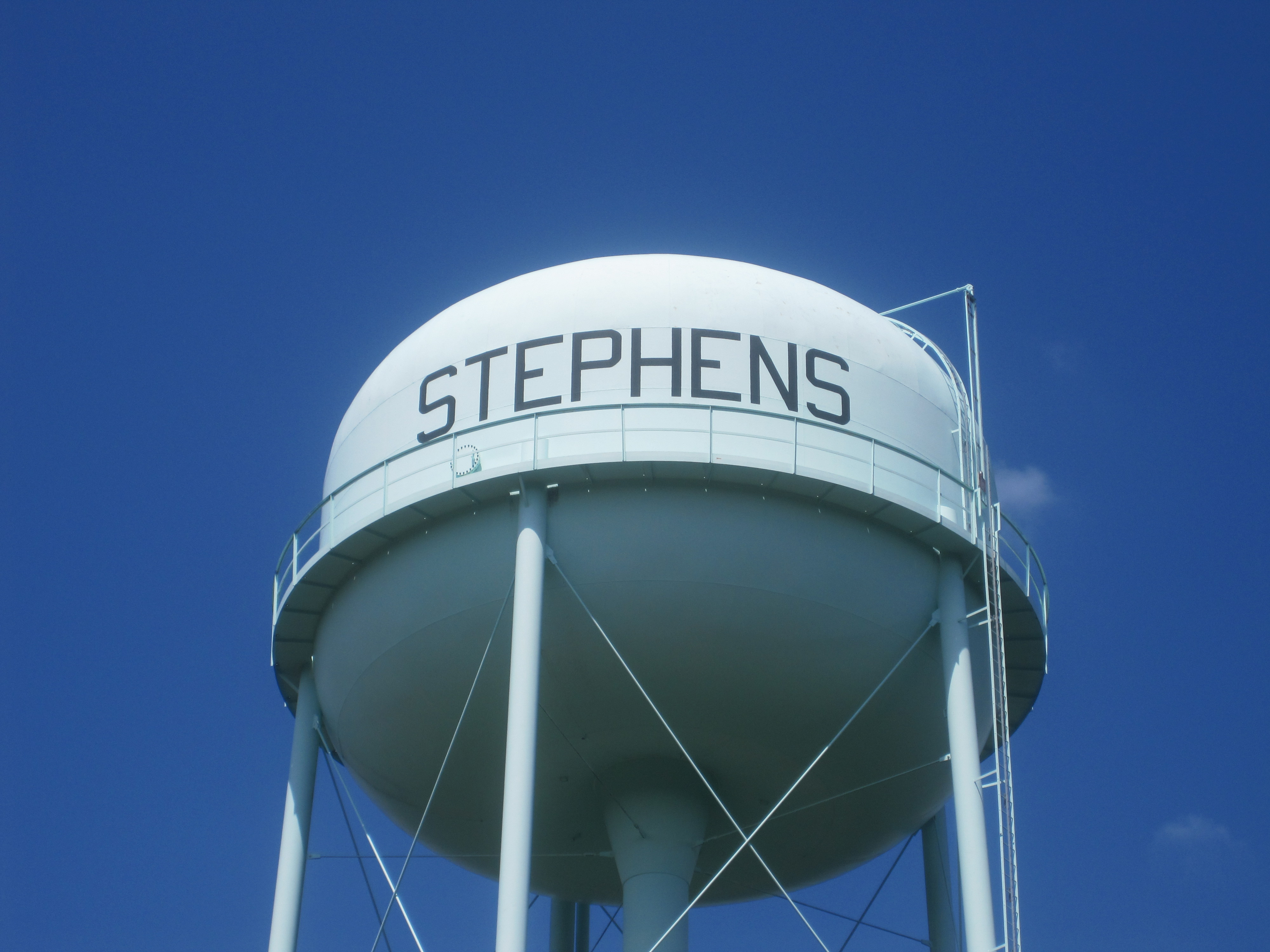
- Water tower in Stephens

- Location of Stephens in Ouachita County, Arkansas.
- Coordinates: 33°25′20″N 93°04′01″W
- Country: United States
- State: Arkansas
- County: Ouachita

Area
  - Total: 2.77 sq mi (7.17 km^{2})
  - Land: 2.76 sq mi (7.14 km^{2})
  - Water: 0.012 sq mi (0.03 km^{2})
- Elevation: 259 ft (79 m)

Population (2020)
  - Total: 770
  - Estimate (2025): 749 ▼
  - Density: 279.4/sq mi (107.89/km^{2})
- Time zone: UTC-6 (Central (CST))
  - Summer (DST): UTC-5 (CDT)
- ZIP code: 71764
- Area code: 870
- FIPS code: 05-66860
- GNIS feature ID: 2405528
- Website: cityofstephens.com

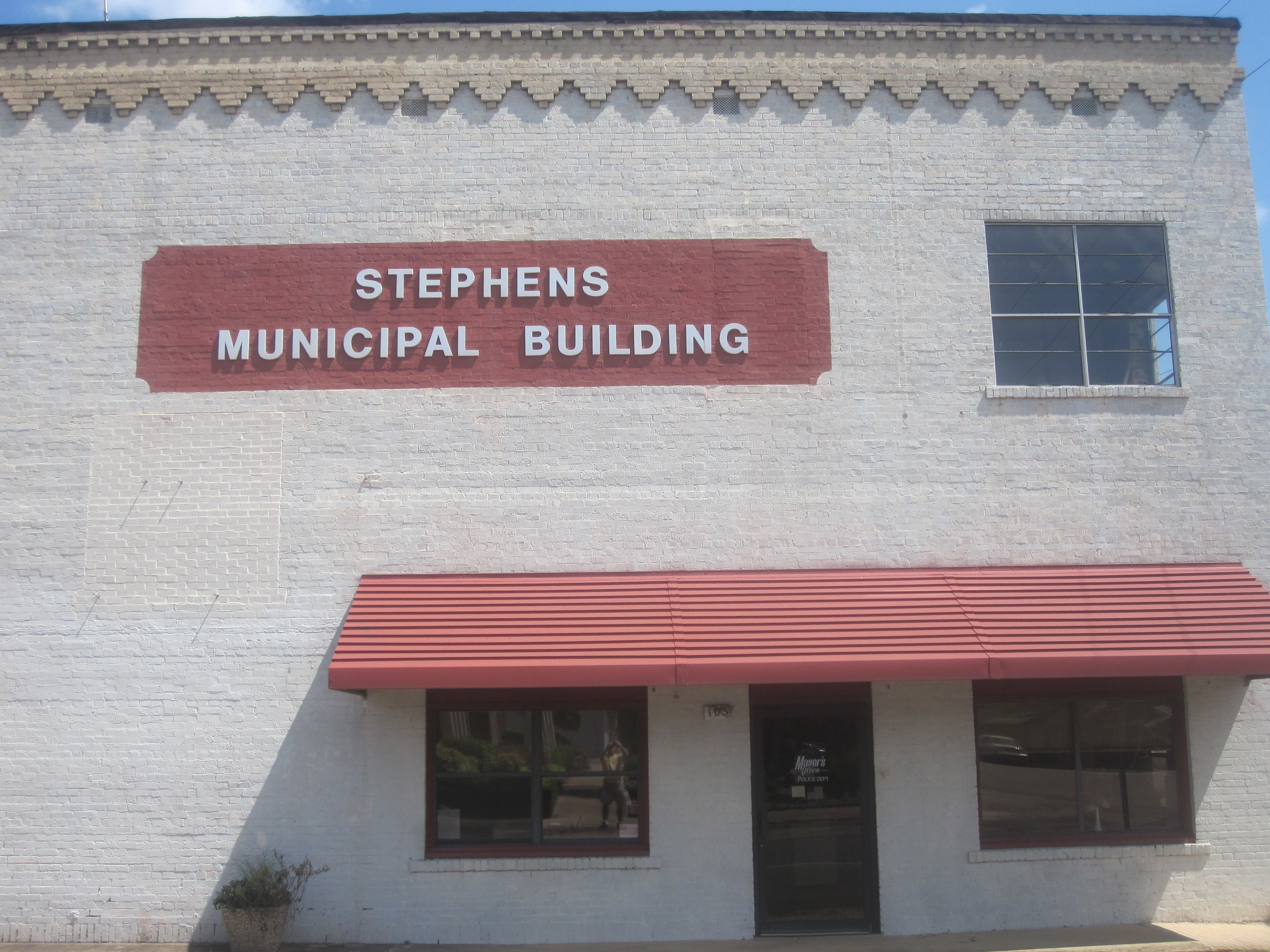
Stephens Municipal Building

Stephens is a city in southwest Ouachita County, Arkansas, United States. As of the 2020 census, Stephens had a population of 770. It is part of the Camden Micropolitan Statistical Area. Stephens was incorporated in 1889.

== Geography ==
According to the United States Census Bureau, the city has a total area of 2.8 square miles (7.3 km^{2}), of which 2.7 square miles (7.0 km^{2}) is land and 0.04 square miles (0.10 km^{2}) (0.73%) is water.

== Demographics ==
Historical population
Census	Pop.	Note	%±
1890	379		—
1900	407		7.4%
1910	572		40.5%
1920	769		34.4%
1930	1,045		35.9%
1940	998		−4.5%
1950	1,283		28.6%
1960	1,275		−0.6%
1970	1,184		−7.1%
1980	1,366		15.4%
1990	1,137		−16.8%
2000	1,152		1.3%
2010	891		−22.7%
2020	770		−13.6%
2025 (est.)	749	▼	−2.7%
U.S. Decennial Census

=== 2020 census ===
Stephens racial composition
Race	Num.	Perc.
White (non-Hispanic)	276	35.84%
Black or African American (non-Hispanic)	462	60.00%
Native American	4	0.52%
Other/Mixed	27	3.51%
Hispanic or Latino	1	0.13%

As of the 2020 United States census, there were 770 people, 376 households, and 237 families residing in the city.

=== 2010 census ===
As of the 2010 United States census, there were 891 people living in the city. The racial makeup of the city was 57.1% Black, 40.6% White, 0.1% Native American, 0.1% from some other race and 1.1% from two or more races. 0.9% were Hispanic or Latino of any race.

=== 2000 census ===
As of the census of 2000, there were 1,152 people, 448 households, and 317 families living in the city. The population density was 421.8 inhabitants per square mile (162.9/km^{2}). There were 509 housing units at an average density of 186.4 per square mile (72.0/km^{2}). The racial makeup of the city was 53.04% White, 45.83% Black or African American, 0.35% Native American, 0.17% from other races, and 0.61% from two or more races. 0.69% of the population were Hispanic or Latino of any race.

There were 448 households, out of which 30.6% had children under the age of 18 living with them, 47.8% were married couples living together, 19.9% had a female householder with no husband present, and 29.2% were non-families. 28.1% of all households were made up of individuals, and 19.4% had someone living alone who was 65 years of age or older. The average household size was 2.57 and the average family size was 3.14.

In the city, the population was spread out, with 28.3% under the age of 18, 8.5% from 18 to 24, 23.5% from 25 to 44, 22.0% from 45 to 64, and 17.7% who were 65 years of age or older. The median age was 37 years. For every 100 females, there were 79.2 males. For every 100 females age 18 and over, there were 74.3 males.

The median income for a household in the city was $22,045, and the median income for a family was $30,903. Males had a median income of $25,568 versus $20,333 for females. The per capita income for the city was $10,608. About 30.4% of families and 32.6% of the population were below the poverty line, including 41.7% of those under age 18 and 28.8% of those age 65 or over.

== Education ==
Students are zoned to the Camden Fairview School District, including Camden Fairview High School.

It was previously served by the Stephens School District, which operated Stephens High School. The Arkansas Board of Education voted to dissolve the Stephens district in April 2014. A portion in Ouachita County was assigned to Camden Fairview, affecting about 140 students. Camden Fairview took ownership of the Stephens district buildings in Stephens. In 2021, The Stephens Highschool was reopened under the ownership of The Apostolic Church of Stephens (ACTS Church) as a private school.

== Notable people ==
- Dee Brown, author
- Bobby Collier, American football player
- Barbara Hendricks, opera and lieder soprano singer
- Dick Hughes, baseball player, pitcher for the St. Louis Cardinals
- Joe Perry, NFL Hall of Fame running back
- Frank Spooner, Louisiana businessman and politician, born in Stephens in 1937.

== Gallery ==
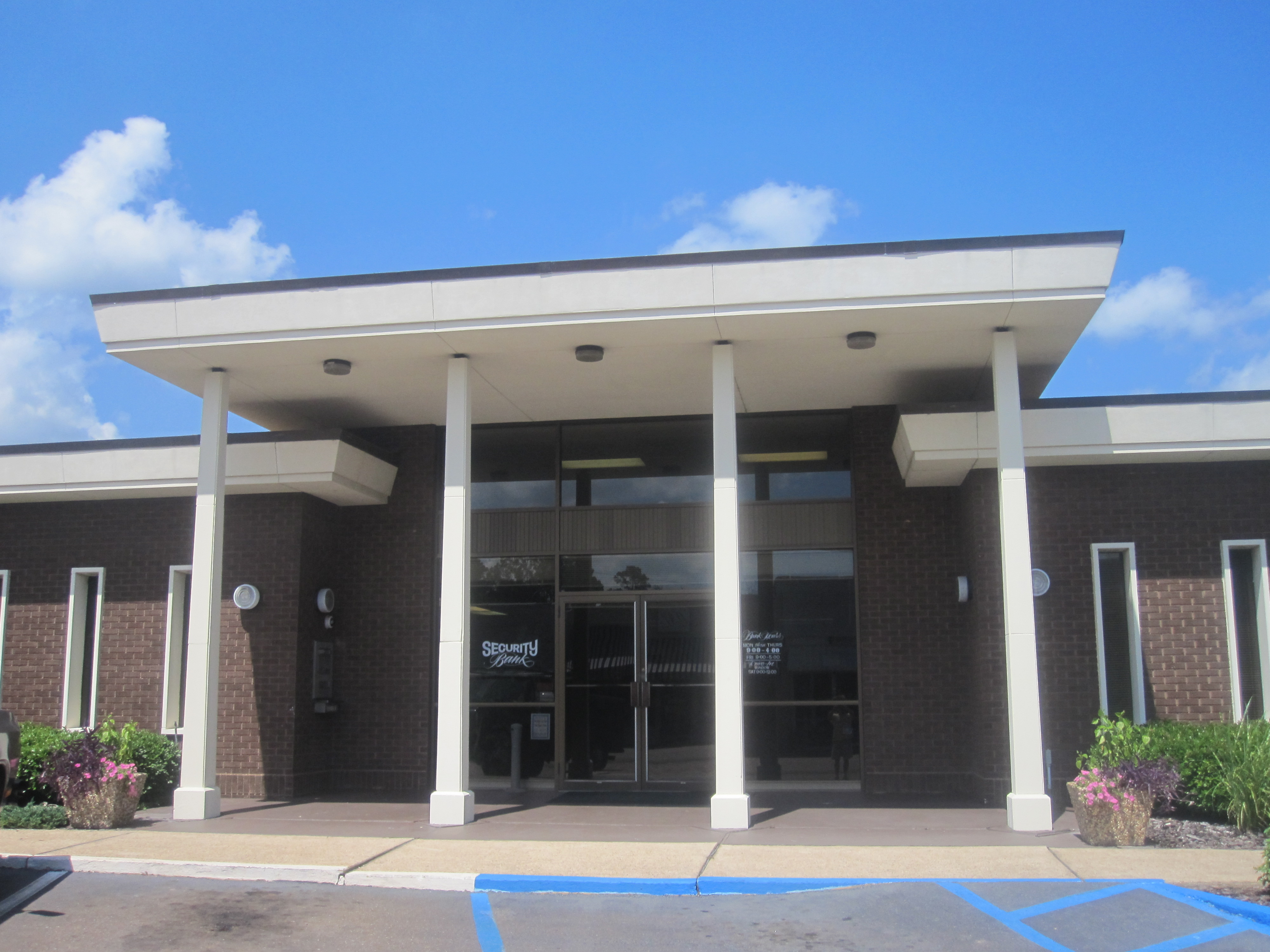
Across from the municipal building, Security Bank is a major business in Stephens.

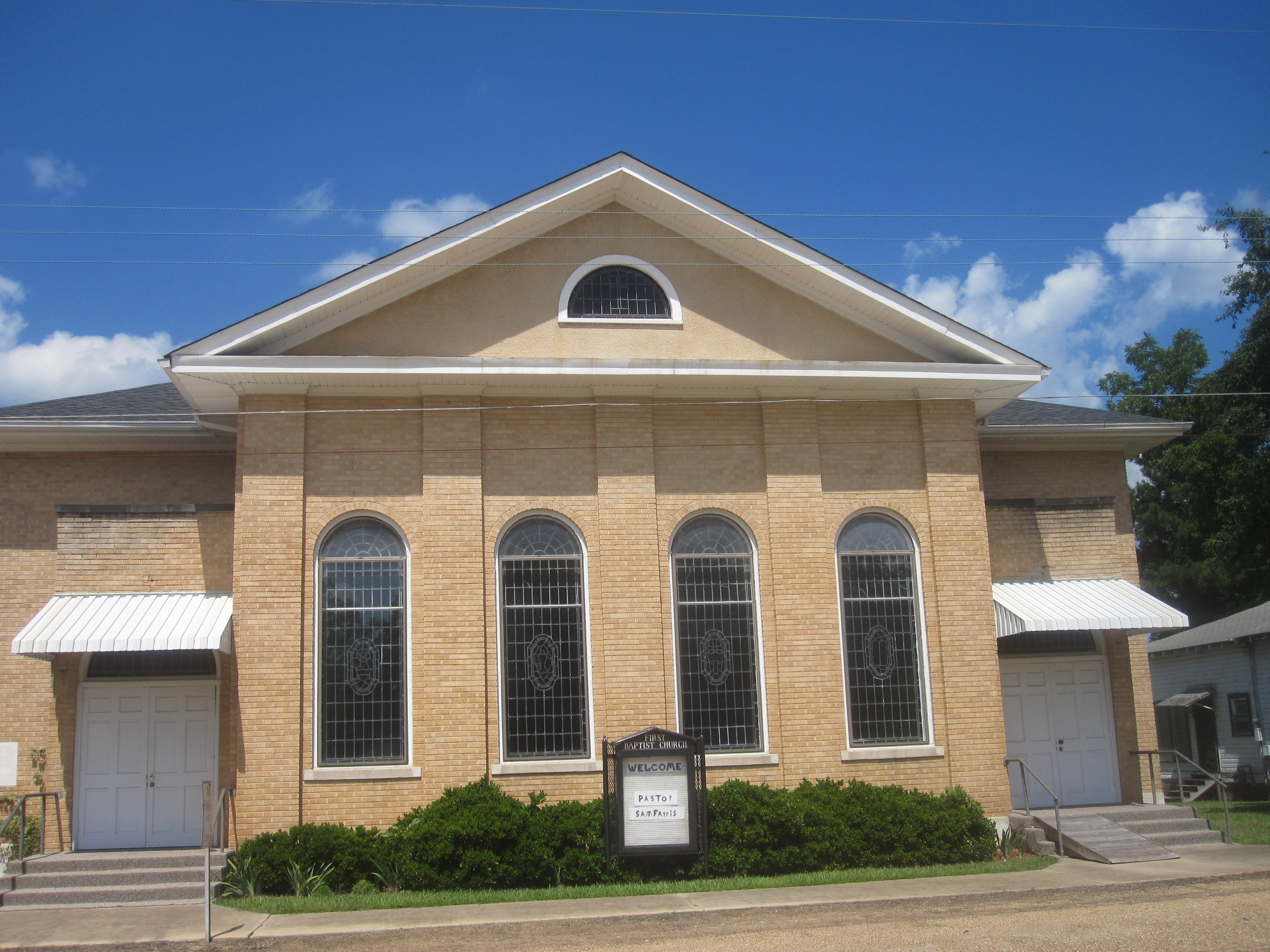
First Baptist Church of Stephens

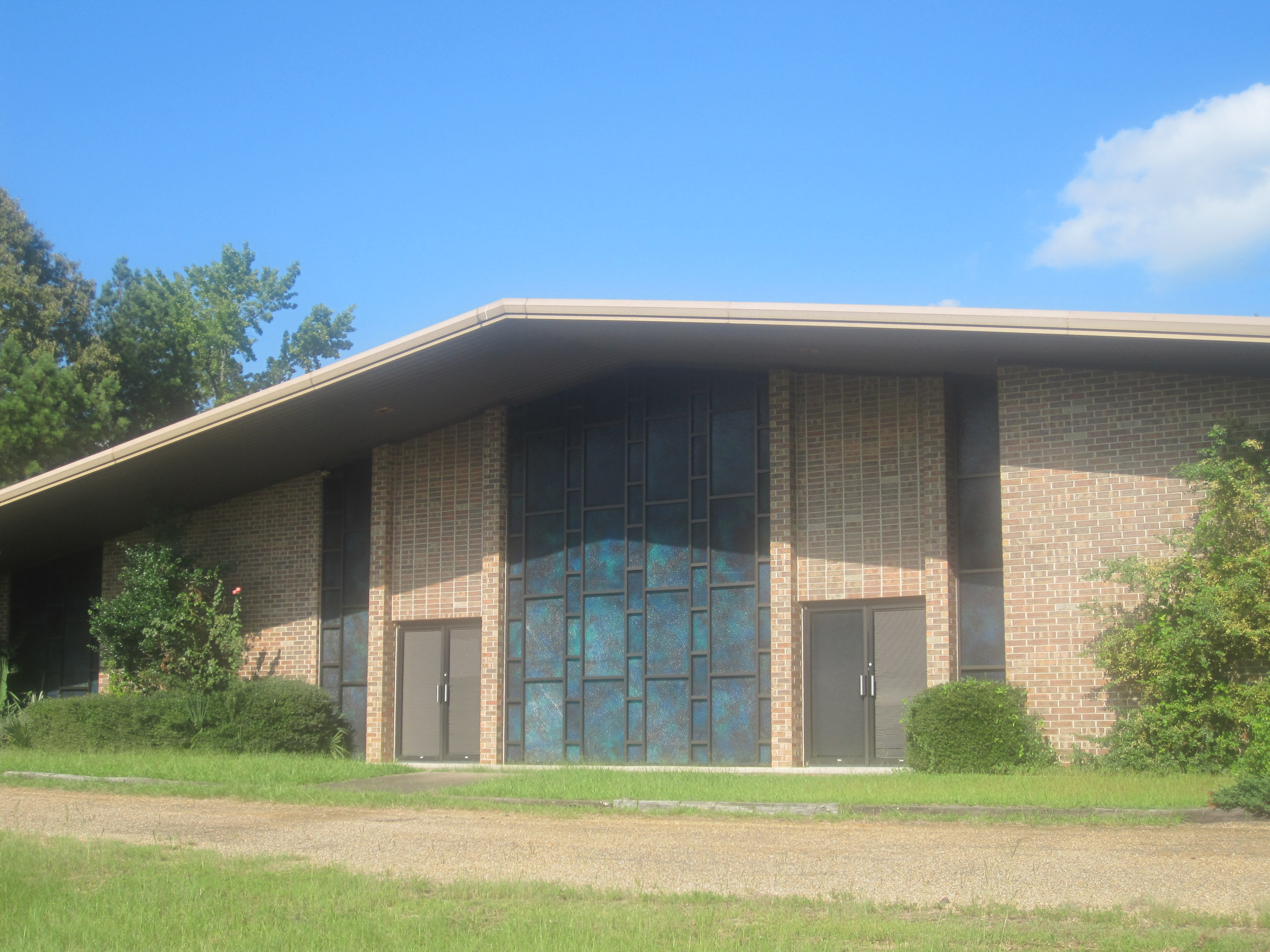
Stephens Church of Christ off U.S. Highway 79 North

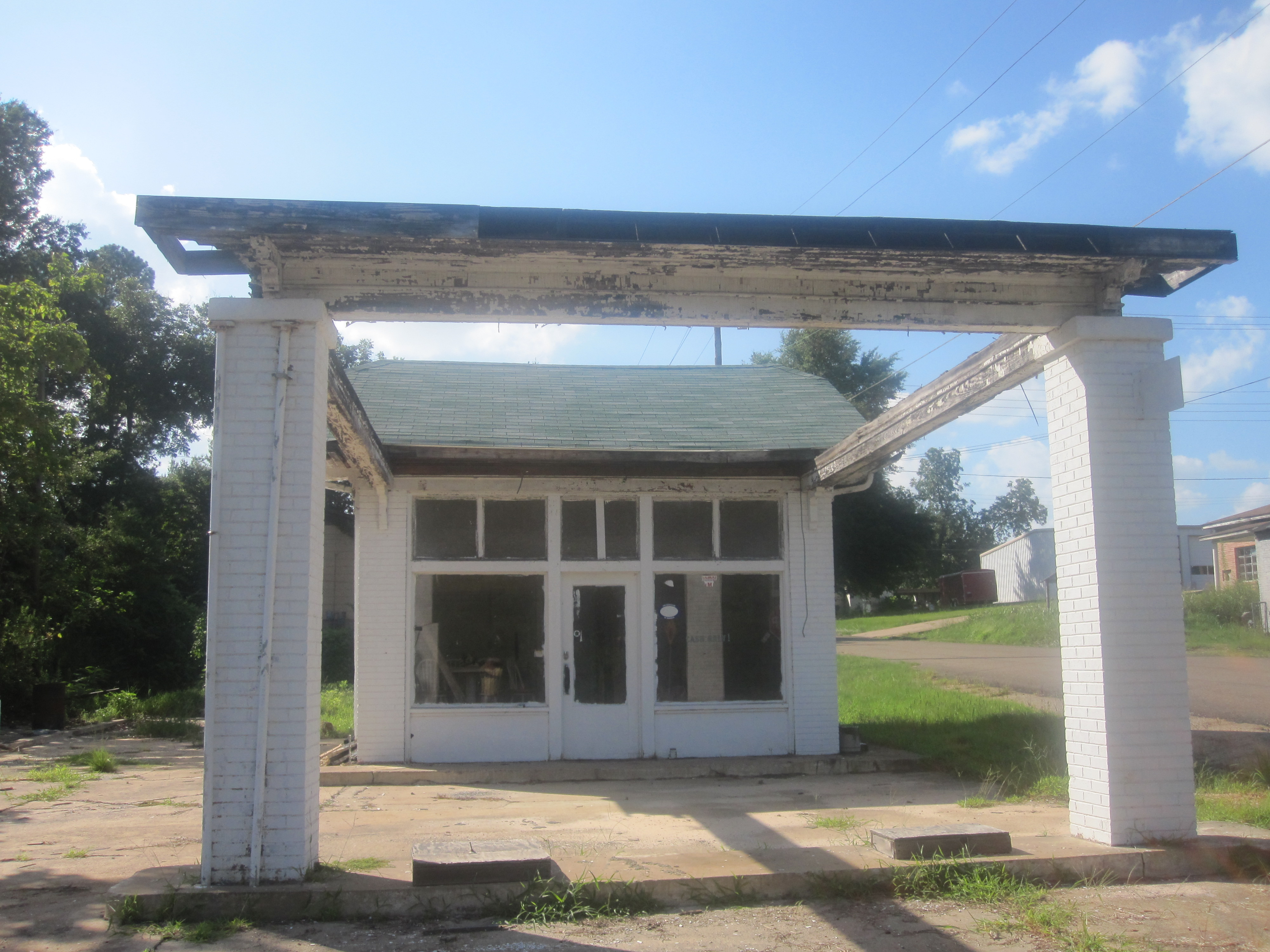
Abandoned gasoline station in Stephens
