= Fort Lookout (Arkansas) =

- U.S. National Register of Historic Places
- U.S. National Historic Landmark District – Contributing property
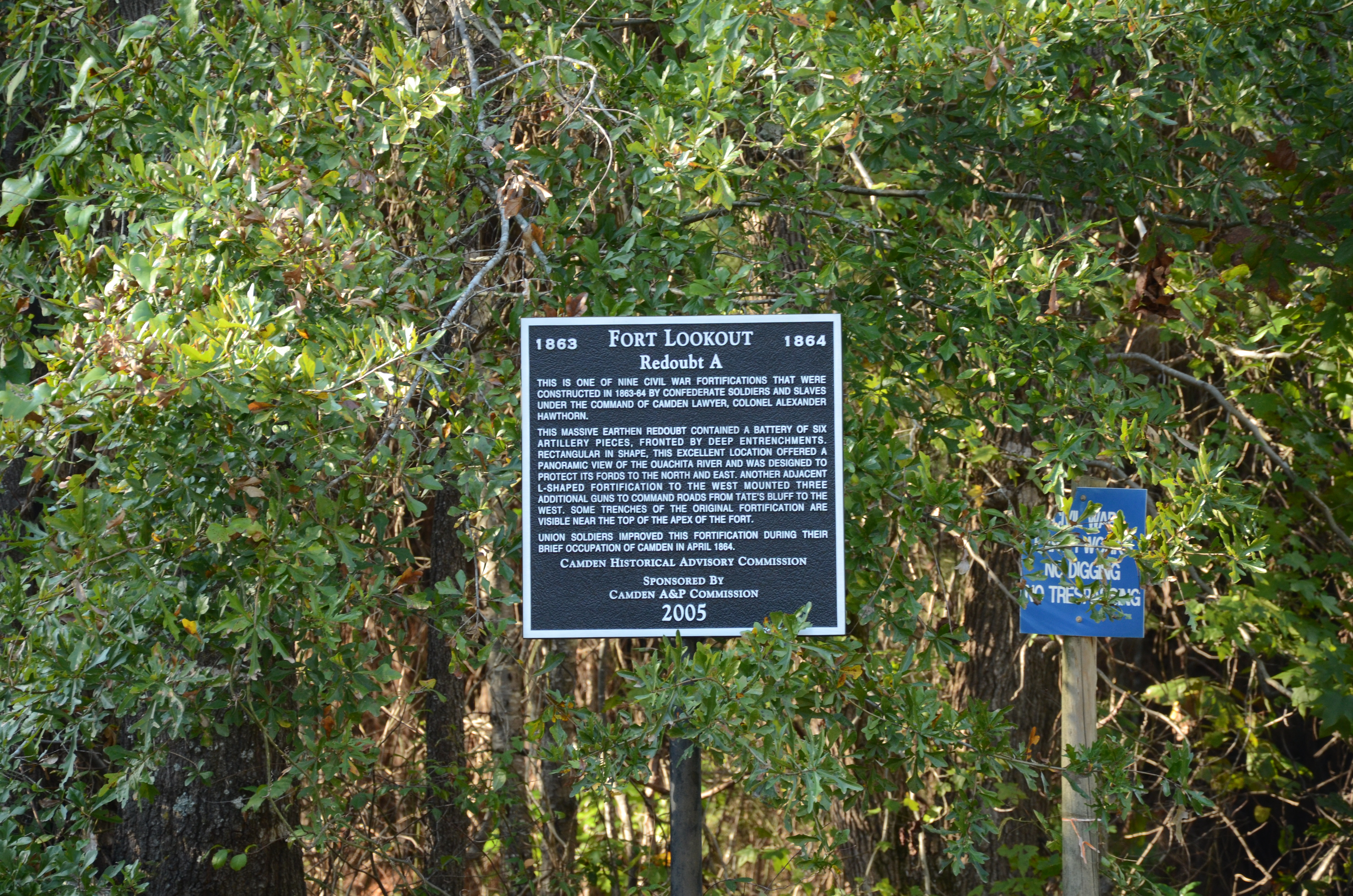

- Location within Arkansas
- Location: Camden, Arkansas
- Coordinates: 33°36′03″N 92°50′04″W
- Built: 1864
- Part of: Camden Expedition Sites (ID94001182)
- NRHP reference No.: 94001183

Significant dates
- Added to NRHP: April 19, 1994
- Designated NHLDCP: April 19, 1994

Fort Lookout, also known as Redoubt A, is a defensive earthworks erected during the American Civil War on the outskirts of Camden, Arkansas. It was the northernmost of a series of five redoubts built in defense of the city by Confederate Army forces in early 1864, preparatory to the Union Army's Camden Expedition (March–May 1864). The site has been designated a National Historic Landmark as part of the Camden Expedition Sites, a collection of military sites related to the expedition.

== Description ==
Fort Lookout is a rectangular earthworks located on a bluff 50 feet (15 m) overlooking a bend in the Ouachita River. Immediately west of the main works is an L-shaped redoubt which commands potential fording sites at the base of the bluff. Each of these sites was capable of mounting at least six guns of the period. The site is located about 1 mile (1.6 km) west of United States Route 79, off Gravel Pit Road. The main earthworks has been partially compromised by the construction of a home near its midsection. The rest of the site has reverted to forest, and is otherwise in good condition. Remnant trenches lead away from the main works along the ridge to the east.

== History ==
Brigadier General General Alexander T. Hawthorn, a Camden native, had been given the task of organizing the city's defenses. From January to March Confederate troops and slave labor worked to develop a series of five redoubts, mainly to protect the southern and western land-based approaches to the city. Union Major General Frederick Steele, in command of the forces occupying Little Rock, was ordered to move southwest to effect a junction with Major General Nathaniel Prentice Banks' Red River Campaign, a push to take Shreveport, Louisiana and eventually gain a Union foothold in Texas. Steele's force left Little Rock on March 23, 1864, passing through thinly-populated southwestern Arkansas. His advance was blunted at the Battle of Prairie D'Ane (April 9–13). Needing provisions, Steele ordered his forces to march on Camden, which they occupied on April 15 after it was abandoned by its small number of defenders. During the Union's brief (ten-day) occupation, the defenses were expanded with additional trenches and earthworks. Steele was prompted to reconsider the continued occupation of Camden after supply-related initiatives were set back at Poison Spring (April 18) and Marks' Mills (April 25), and withdrew from Camden toward Little Rock on April 26.

Camden's defenses were further expanded after Confederate forces reoccupied the city. A weak point that was known to both sides, the waterfront area, was fortified in October 1864. By the end of the year a complete trench line encircled the city.

== See also ==
- List of National Historic Landmarks in Arkansas
- National Register of Historic Places listings in Ouachita County, Arkansas
- Fort Southerland, the other surviving redoubt
