= Stacy Andrews =

American football player (born 1981)

No. 79, 76, 77, 78
- Position: Right tackle

Personal information
- Born: June 2, 1981 (age 45); Camden, Arkansas, U.S.
- Listed height: 6 ft 7 in (2.01 m)
- Listed weight: 318 lb (144 kg)

Career information
- High school: Fairview (Camden)
- College: Ole Miss
- NFL draft: 2004: 4th round, 123rd overall pick

Career history
- Cincinnati Bengals (2004–2008); Philadelphia Eagles (2009); Seattle Seahawks (2010); New York Giants (2011)

Awards and highlights
- Super Bowl champion (XLVI)

Career NFL statistics
- Games played: 94
- Games started: 49
- Fumble recoveries: 1
- Stats at Pro Football Reference

Stacy Dewayne Andrews (born June 2, 1981) is an American former professional football player who was an offensive tackle in the National Football League (NFL). He was selected by the Cincinnati Bengals in the fourth round of the 2004 NFL draft. He played college football for the Ole Miss Rebels.

Andrews also played for the Philadelphia Eagles, Seattle Seahawks and New York Giants. He is the older brother of offensive tackle Shawn Andrews.

== Early life ==
Andrews attended Camden Fairview High School.

== College career ==
While at Ole Miss, Andrews competed for the Rebels track and field team as a thrower. He never competed in football until his senior year at the University of Mississippi.

== Professional career ==
Pre-draft measurables
Height	Weight	Arm length	Hand span	40-yard dash	10-yard split	20-yard split	20-yard shuttle	Three-cone drill	Vertical jump	Broad jump	Bench press
6 ft 6 1/8 in (1.98 m)	342 lb (155 kg)	34 3/4 in (0.88 m)	9 3/4 in (0.25 m)	5.11 s	1.81 s	3.01 s	4.78 s	8.09 s	30 1/2 in (0.77 m)	8 ft 10 in (2.69 m)	34 reps
All values from NFL Combine

=== Cincinnati Bengals ===
Andrews was selected by the Cincinnati Bengals in the fourth round (123rd overall) in the 2004 NFL draft. He played in every game during the 2006 and 2007 seasons. During the 2007 season, Andrews started three games at left guard before starting the final eleven games of the season at right tackle, filling in for injured starter Willie Anderson. Because of his versatility and effectiveness, the Bengals placed the franchise tag on Andrews on February 18, 2008, despite the fact that Andrews did not officially have a starting job on the Bengals line. Andrews signed his one-year, $7.455 million tender on March 19. He tore his right anterior cruciate ligament in week 16 against the Cleveland Browns.

=== Philadelphia Eagles ===
Andrews signed a six-year contract with the Philadelphia Eagles on February 27, 2009. The move united him with his brother, Shawn Andrews, who was an offensive lineman for the Eagles at the time. The Andrews brothers did not play together, however, because Shawn Andrews was injured throughout the entire season, and was eventually released on March 17, 2010.

In week 2 of the 2009 season, Stacy Andrews was benched in favor of Max Jean-Gilles due to his knee injury from the previous season and his need for more practice with offensive line coach Juan Castillo on his pass-blocking.

In March 2010, Andrews agreed to restructure his contract, reducing his base salary.

=== Seattle Seahawks ===
Andrews was traded to the Seattle Seahawks in exchange for an undisclosed 2011 draft pick on September 4, 2010. He was released by the Seahawks on July 28, 2011, after one season in Seattle.

=== New York Giants ===
On August 3, 2011, Andrews signed with the New York Giants. In week 13 of the 2011 NFL season, he did not play against the Green Bay Packers after he was hospitalized for pulmonary embolisms in both lungs. He became a free agent after the season.
