= Waldo, Arkansas =

- City
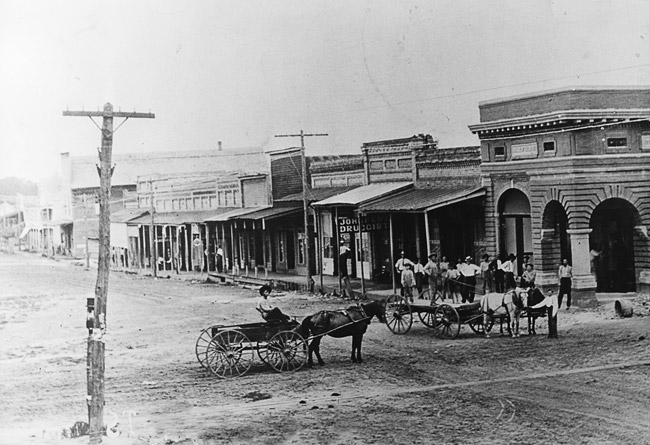
- Waldo c.1910

- Location of Waldo in Columbia County, Arkansas.
- Coordinates: 33°21′08″N 93°17′44″W
- Country: United States
- State: Arkansas
- County: Columbia

Area
  - Total: 2.20 sq mi (5.69 km^{2})
  - Land: 2.19 sq mi (5.68 km^{2})
  - Water: 0 sq mi (0.00 km^{2})
- Elevation: 358 ft (109 m)

Population (2020)
  - Total: 1,151
  - Estimate (2025): 1,100 ▼
  - Density: 524.7/sq mi (202.59/km^{2})
- Time zone: UTC−06:00 (Central (CST))
  - Summer (DST): UTC−05:00 (CDT)
- ZIP Code: 71770
- Area code: 870
- FIPS code: 05-72350
- GNIS feature ID: 2405659

Waldo is a city in Columbia County, Arkansas, United States. As of the 2020 census, Waldo had a population of 1,151.

== History ==
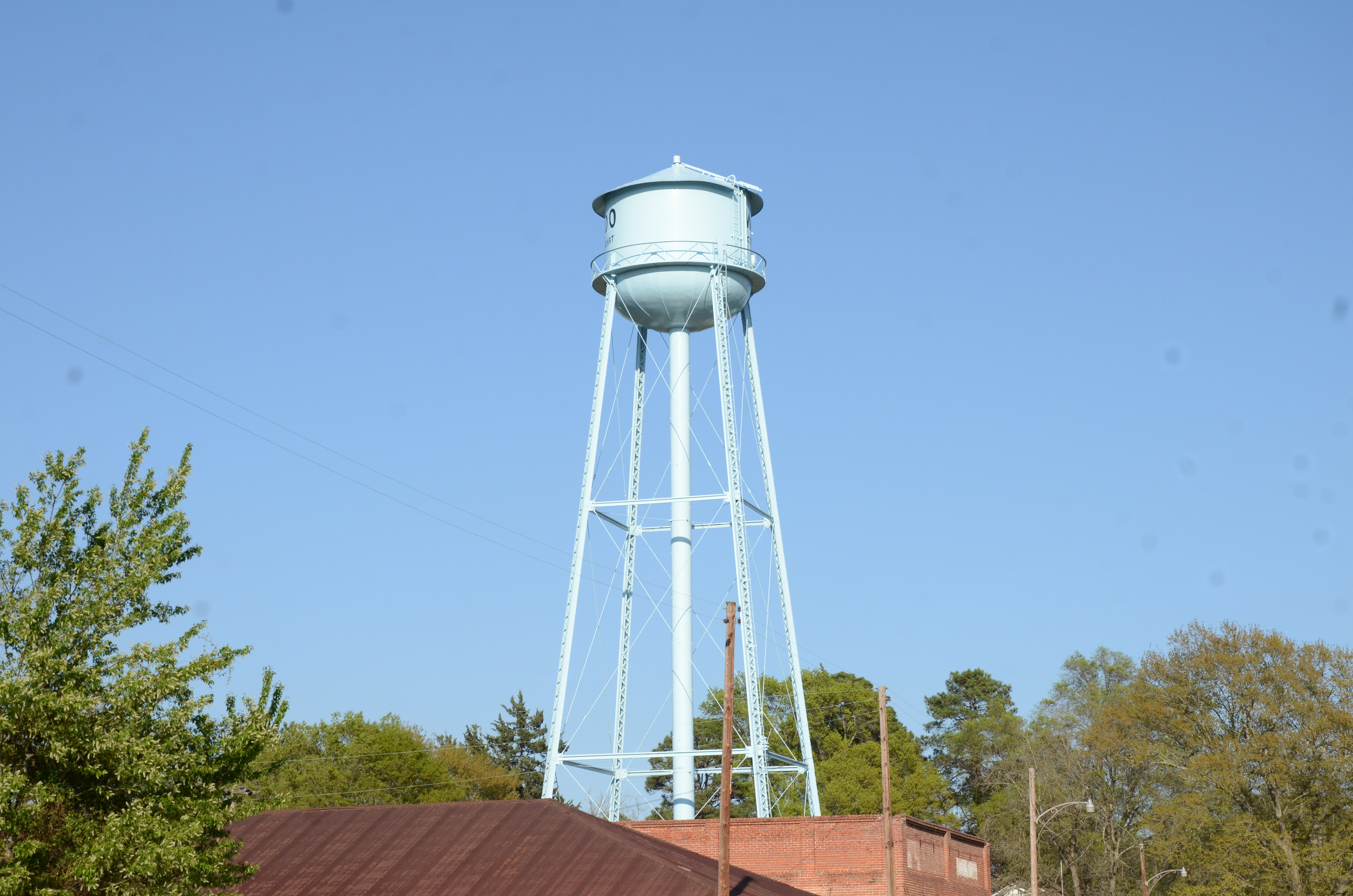
Waldo water tower, 2016

Waldo celebrated its 120th year as a city in 2007. The small community was once a booming rail city on the Cotton Belt train route. The city has a rail museum with various displays showing its rail history.

The city began to wane in population in the 1950s when neighboring Magnolia began drawing industry.

Waldo was once home to the Waldo High School Bulldogs basketball teams. Consistently these teams made playoffs and on numerous occasions won the state championship. The legacy of Waldo School will carry on in the community despite its closing in 2005.

The Waldo Water Tower, completed in 1936 by the Pittsburgh-Des Moines Steel Co., is listed on the National Register of Historic Places.

== Geography ==
Waldo is located in northwestern Columbia County. By U.S. Route 371 it is 7 miles (11 km) northwest of Magnolia, the county seat.

According to the United States Census Bureau, the city has a total area of 2.3 square miles (5.9 km^{2}), all land.

Waldo, located in South Arkansas near the northern Louisiana border, has a subtropical climate like that of the Bayou State and similar terrain. The area is characterized by lowlands and swamps. Most of the area in and about the city is covered with pine or hardwood forests.

== Demographics ==
Historical population
Census	Pop.	Note	%±
1890	709		—
1900	929		31.0%
1910	597		−35.7%
1920	704		17.9%
1930	942		33.8%
1940	1,240		31.6%
1950	1,491		20.2%
1960	1,722		15.5%
1970	1,658		−3.7%
1980	1,685		1.6%
1990	1,495		−11.3%
2000	1,594		6.6%
2010	1,372		−13.9%
2020	1,151		−16.1%
2025 (est.)	1,100	▼	−4.4%
U.S. Decennial Census

=== 2020 census ===
As of the 2020 census, Waldo had a population of 1,151. The median age was 37.8 years. 27.9% of residents were under the age of 18 and 16.5% of residents were 65 years of age or older. For every 100 females there were 85.6 males, and for every 100 females age 18 and over there were 79.3 males age 18 and over.

0.0% of residents lived in urban areas, while 100.0% lived in rural areas.

There were 504 households in Waldo, of which 31.5% had children under the age of 18 living in them. Of all households, 28.0% were married-couple households, 19.2% were households with a male householder and no spouse or partner present, and 45.2% were households with a female householder and no spouse or partner present. About 32.1% of all households were made up of individuals and 14.1% had someone living alone who was 65 years of age or older.

There were 649 housing units, of which 22.3% were vacant. The homeowner vacancy rate was 2.0% and the rental vacancy rate was 23.2%.

Waldo racial composition
Race	Num.	Perc.
White (non-Hispanic)	274	23.81%
Black or African American (non-Hispanic)	822	71.42%
Native American	1	0.09%
Other/Mixed	39	3.39%
Hispanic or Latino	15	1.3%

=== 2000 census ===
As of the census of 2000, there were 1,594 people, 645 households, and 425 families residing in the city. The population density was 720.4 inhabitants per square mile (278.1/km^{2}). There were 749 housing units at an average density of 338.5 per square mile (130.7/km^{2}). The racial makeup of the city was 39.77% White, 58.72% Black or African American, 0.38% Native American, 0.63% from other races, and 0.50% from two or more races. 1.57% of the population were Hispanic or Latino of any race.

There were 645 households, of which 29.8% had children under the age of 18 living with them, 35.3% were married couples living together, 26.0% had a female householder with no husband present, and 34.0% were non-families. 29.3% of all households were made up of individuals, and 14.3% had someone living alone who was 65 years of age or older. The average household size was 2.47 and the average family size was 3.05.

In the city, the population was spread out, with 27.8% under the age of 18, 11.5% from 18 to 24, 24.0% from 25 to 44, 21.9% from 45 to 64, and 14.8% who were 65 years of age or older. The median age was 34 years. For every 100 females, there were 81.1 males. For every 100 females age 18 and over, there were 74.7 males.

The median income for a household in the city was $20,353, and the median income for a family was $24,306. Males had a median income of $25,300 versus $17,212 for females. The per capita income for the city was $11,170. About 30.6% of families and 34.2% of the population were below the poverty line, including 49.2% of those under age 18 and 21.5% of those age 65 or over.

== Education ==
The Magnolia School District, including Magnolia High School, serves the community. The Waldo School District consolidated into the Magnolia district on July 1, 2006. The Waldo district operated Waldo Elementary School (K-6) and Waldo High School (7-12).

== Infrastructure ==
=== Highways ===
- U.S. Highway 371
- Arkansas Highway 98

== Notable people ==
- Mujahid Abdul-Karim, leader of the Imam Mahdi Movement
- Chris DeFrance, professional football player
- Travis Jackson, baseball shortstop; National Baseball Hall of Fame
- Sytia Messer, college basketball coach
- Travis E. Watkins, recipient of the Medal of Honor for his actions in the Korean War

== See also ==
- List of towns in Arkansas
