= Camden Water Battery =

- U.S. National Register of Historic Places
- Nearest city: Camden, Arkansas
- Area: 5 acres (2.0 ha)
- Built: 1864
- Built by: Forney's Texas Division
- NRHP reference No.: 07000615
- Added to NRHP: May 30, 2007

The Camden Water Battery is a series of defenses established along the banks of the Ouachita River in Camden, Arkansas, during the American Civil War. These defenses, little more than a series of rifle pits, were built during the fall of 1864, and were designed to address a weakness in Camden's defense that had been observed by both Confederate and Union forces during the failed Camden Expedition, an effort by Union forces to reach Shreveport, Louisiana, from Little Rock. The defenses are believed to have been built by Texas troops stationed there after the withdrawal of Union forces.

The defenses were listed on the National Register of Historic Places in 2007.

== See also ==
- Fort Lookout
- Fort Southerland
- National Register of Historic Places listings in Ouachita County, Arkansas
