= Bobby Collier =

American football player (1929–2000)

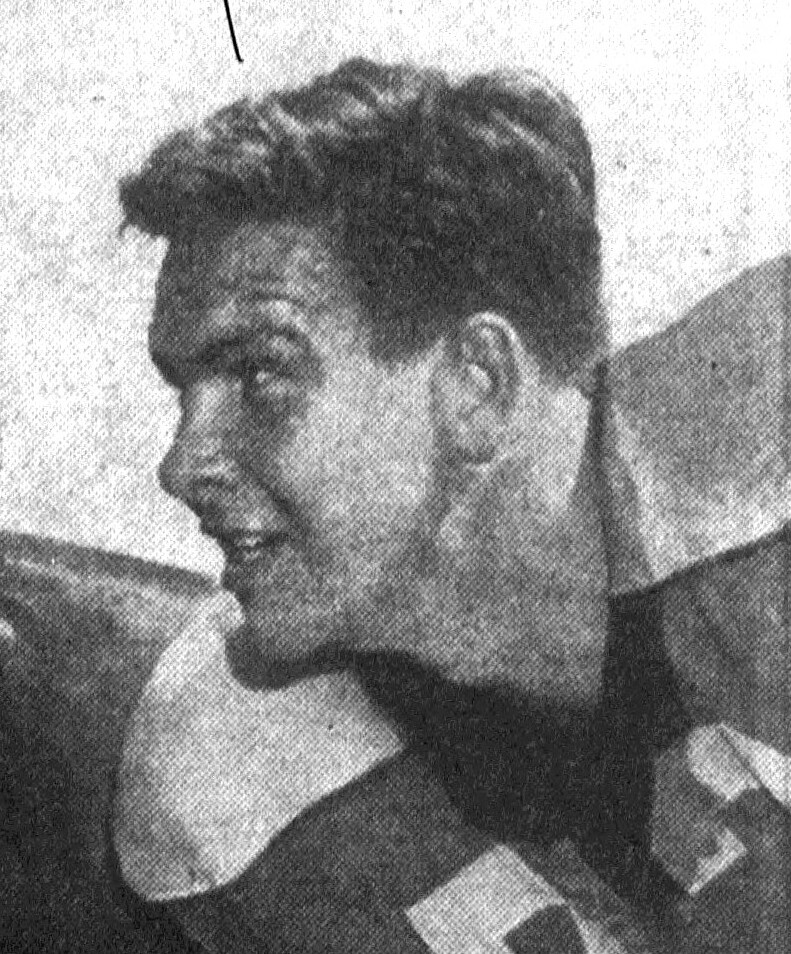
- Collier, circa 1951

No. 72
- Positions: Offensive tackle, defensive end

Personal information
- Born: December 11, 1929; Stephens, Arkansas, U.S.
- Died: November 15, 2000 (aged 70)
- Listed height: 6 ft 3 in (1.91 m)
- Listed weight: 230 lb (104 kg)

Career information
- High school: Longview (Longview, Texas)
- College: SMU (1947–1950)
- NFL draft: 1950: 18th round, 233rd overall pick

Career history
- Los Angeles Rams (1951)

Awards and highlights
- NFL champion (1951); 2× Second-team All-SWC (1949, 1950)

Career NFL statistics
- Games played: 11
- Fumble recoveries: 1
- Stats at Pro Football Reference

Bobby Frank Collier (December 11, 1929 – November 15, 2000) was an American professional football player who played one season with the Los Angeles Rams of the National Football League (NFL). He was selected by the Rams in the 18th round of the 1950 NFL draft. He played college football at Southern Methodist University.

== Early life and college ==
Bobby Frank Collier was born on December 11, 1929, in Stephens, Arkansas. He attended Longview High School in Longview, Texas.

He was a member of the SMU Mustangs of Southern Methodist University from 1947 to 1950 and a three-year letterman from 1948 to 1950. He was named second-team All-Southwest Conference by the Associated Press in 1949 and 1950.

== Professional career ==
In January 1950, Collier was selected by the Los Angeles Rams in the 18th round, with the 233rd overall pick, of the 1950 NFL draft. He signed with the team in 1951. He played in 11 games for the Rams during the 1951 season, recording one fumble recovery and one kick return for 8 yards. Collier also played in the 1951 NFL Championship Game, 24–17 victory over the Cleveland Browns. He became a free agent after the 1951 season.

== Personal life ==
Collier died on November 15, 2000.
