= Shawn Andrews (American football) =

American football player (born 1982)

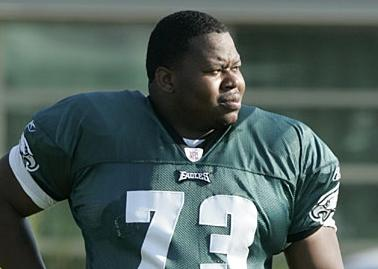
- Andrews with the Philadelphia Eagles in 2007

No. 73
- Position: Guard

Personal information
- Born: December 25, 1982 (age 43); Camden, Arkansas, U.S.
- Listed height: 6 ft 4 in (1.93 m)
- Listed weight: 330 lb (150 kg)

Career information
- High school: Camden Fairview (Camden)
- College: Arkansas (2001–2003)
- NFL draft: 2004: 1st round, 16th overall pick

Career history
- Philadelphia Eagles (2004–2009); New York Giants (2010)

Awards and highlights
- First-team All-Pro (2006); 2× Pro Bowl (2006, 2007); Philadelphia Eagles 75th Anniversary Team; Jim Parker Trophy (2003); Unanimous All-American (2003); Consensus All-American (2002); 2× Jacobs Blocking Trophy (2002, 2003); 2× First-team All-SEC (2002, 2003); Second-team All-SEC (2001); Arkansas Sports Hall of Fame

Career NFL statistics
- Games played: 63
- Games started: 57
- Fumble recoveries: 1
- Stats at Pro Football Reference

Shawn Cornelius Andrews (born December 25, 1982) is an American former professional football player who was a guard and offensive tackle for the Philadelphia Eagles and New York Giants of the National Football League (NFL). He played college football for the Arkansas Razorbacks, and was a two-time consensus All-American. Philadelphia selected him in the first round of the 2004 NFL draft, and he earned two Pro Bowl selections during his career. He was inducted to the Arkansas Sports Hall of Fame in 2018.

== Early life ==
Shawn Andrews was born on Christmas Day in 1982 to his mother Linda Andrews. He was raised, along with his two brothers Stacy and Derrick, in the city of Camden, Arkansas. He attended Camden Fairview High School, where he was successful as an offensive lineman for the football team. Andrews earned numerous accolades including Parade, USA Today and Prep Football Report first-team All-American honors. He also participated for the high school track team in shot put and discus.

== College career ==
Andrews received an athletic scholarship to attend the University of Arkansas in Fayetteville, Arkansas, where he played for the Arkansas Razorbacks football team from 2001 to 2003. He started as a freshman in 2001 and was named to the Football Writers Association of America Freshman All-America team. Andrews was a two-time first-team All-Southeastern Conference (SEC) selection, received the SEC's Jacobs Blocking Trophy as the conference's best blocker two times, and was recognized as a consensus first-team All-American in 2002 and a unanimous first-team All-American in 2003. He also won the Jim Parker Trophy as the nation's best offensive lineman in 2003, and was also a finalist for the Lombardi Award and the Outland Trophy. In his 35 games played, he only gave up two sacks.

Andrews decided to forgo his senior season at Arkansas and enter the NFL Draft, saying that he did not want to see his mother struggle with financial problems anymore. During his three years with the Razorbacks, Andrews helped Arkansas win 25 games, and a share of the 2002 SEC West Division championship. Andrews did not play in the 2003 Independence Bowl victory over Missouri, but he did play in some significant victories for Arkansas. Some of these included: beating #9 South Carolina on a blocked field goal in 2001, beating Ole Miss in 7 overtimes in 2001, beating LSU in 2002 in the Miracle on Markham game, a 2003 win over the #6 Texas Longhorns in Austin, beating Alabama in Tuscaloosa in double OT in 2003, and winning at Kentucky in 2003 in 7OT.

Andrews is generally considered to be the best offensive linemen, and the most decorated, to ever play for the Razorbacks.

=== College honors and awards ===
- Consensus first-team All-American (2002, 2003)
- Jim Parker Trophy (2003)
- Lombardi Award finalist (2003)
- Outland Trophy finalist (2003)
- Jacobs Blocking Trophy (2002, 2003)
- First-team All-SEC (2002, 2003)

== Professional career ==
Pre-draft measurables
Height	Weight	Arm length	Hand span	40-yard dash	10-yard split	20-yard split	20-yard shuttle	Three-cone drill	Vertical jump	Broad jump	Bench press
6 ft 4 1/8 in (1.93 m)	366 lb (166 kg)	33 3/4 in (0.86 m)	9 3/4 in (0.25 m)	5.49 s	1.96 s	3.20 s	4.85 s	8.25 s	25 in (0.64 m)	8 ft 2 in (2.49 m)	27 reps
All values from NFL Combine

=== Philadelphia Eagles ===
Prior to the draft, the Pittsburgh Steelers had reportedly planned to draft Andrews with the 11th overall pick. However, Steelers owner Dan Rooney overrode both head coach Bill Cowher and director of football operations Kevin Colbert when Ben Roethlisberger was still available and the Steelers not wanting a repeat of passing on a franchise quarterback, as they had done in the 1983 NFL draft when they drafted Gabriel Rivera while local product Dan Marino was still available.

Instead of going to Pittsburgh, Andrews was chosen by Pennsylvania's other NFL team, the Philadelphia Eagles, as the 16th overall pick of the 2004 NFL draft, after trading up with the San Francisco 49ers. The day after selecting Andrews, the Eagles traded John Welbourn to the Kansas City Chiefs, officially making Andrews the team's starting right guard. He responded with a strong preseason although his season was short-lived. Andrews broke his leg in the opening game of the season against the New York Giants and missed the remainder of the Eagles' NFC Championship season.

Andrews returned to the starting lineup for the 2005 season, and started all 16 games for an injury-plagued Eagles team that finished with a 6–10 record. Andrews played well enough to be named an alternate for the NFC Pro Bowl team. Shawn came into the 2006 season as one of the Eagles' top offensive linemen and it showed as the Eagles awarded him a seven-year contract extension that would have kept him with the team through 2015.

At the end of the 2006 season, Andrews was selected as a starter to the Pro Bowl. During a divisional playoff game against the New Orleans Saints, Andrews went down late in the second quarter with a neck injury and was rushed to a nearby hospital. The injury was later revealed to be a contusion and would not impact his status for 2007 season.

Andrews was selected to his second consecutive Pro Bowl in 2007.

Andrews mysteriously departed the Eagles at the end of June 2008. Later he failed to report to training camp at Lehigh University, without notice and without being excused. He cited unexplained "personal issues" in various text messages with reporters. In a newspaper article released on August 4, 2008, Andrews revealed he was suffering from depression and was seeking professional help. He eventually missed 17 days of camp, and returned on August 10. Andrews started in the first two games of the season, but he left in the second game with a back injury. The Eagles did not put him on injured reserve, but the injury caused him to miss the rest of the 2008 season.

Andrews had surgery in the 2009 offseason, but he re-injured his back at the start of training camp, which caused him to miss the entire preseason and the first week of the 2009 season before he was placed on the injured reserve list on September 15, 2009. On March 17, 2010, Andrews was released by the Eagles.

On June 2, 2010, Andrews was selected in the third round of the 2010 UFL draft by the Omaha Nighthawks. He did not sign with the team.

=== New York Giants ===
Andrews signed a six-year contract worth up to $32.6 million with the New York Giants on August 20, 2010, though only $1.5 million for the first season. He made his first career start at left tackle during the team's November 7 game against the Seahawks at Qwest Field. Throughout the year, Andrews struggled with lingering back issues, for which he had to take multiple injections for pain.

On January 1, 2011, he admitted he was likely going to retire due to the back pain. On July 28, 2011, he was released by the Giants. Andrews subsequently retired from football, moved back to Arkansas, and has expressed hopes of becoming a stand-up comic.

== Personal ==
Andrews is the younger brother of former NFL offensive tackle Stacy Andrews. Andrews' son JJ Andrews is a top ranked basketball recruit in the high school class of 2026 who recently committed to play college basketball for head coach John Calipari at Arkansas.
