= Camden Fairview High School =

Location
- 1750 Cash Road; Camden, Arkansas 71701; United States; 33°33′0″N 92°51′8″W

Information
- Type: Public high school
- School district: Camden Fairview School District
- CEEB code: 040350
- NCES School ID: 050606000312
- Principal: Rodney Frazier
- Grades: 9–12
- Enrollment: 693 (2023-2024)
- Colors: Red and white
- Athletics conference: 5A South (2012–14)
- Mascot: Cardinal
- Team name: Camden Fairview Cardinals
- Newspaper: Cardinal Scream
- Yearbook: The Cardinal
- Website: cfhs.cfsd.k12.ar.us

Camden Fairview High School is a secondary school located in Camden, Arkansas, United States. The school is a part of the Camden Fairview School District. The school houses grades 9 through 12. With an approximate enrollment of more than 750, the school is the largest in Camden. The current principal is Rodney Frazier.

It serves several communities, including Camden, Chidester, and Stephens, as well as a portion of Reader.

== History ==
Camden Fairview High School was created by a merger of two schools: Camden High School and Fairview High School. The Fairview School annexed Camden High and Camden Fairview was created. The Camden School District merged into the Fairview School District on October 16, 1990. The newly consolidated school already served Chidester as the Chidester School District consolidated into the Fairview School District on July 1, 1987.

The Arkansas Board of Education voted to dissolve the Stephens School District in April 2014. The portion in Ouachita County, including Stephens, was assigned to Camden Fairview. Therefore Stephens was added to the Camden Fairview High attendance area.

== Academics ==
The assumed course of study for students is to follow the Smart Core curriculum developed by the Arkansas Department of Education (ADE). Students complete regular (core and career focus) courses and exams and may select Advanced Placement (AP) coursework and exams that provide an opportunity for college credit.

== Athletics ==
The mascot of Camden Fairview is the Cardinal with the school colors of red and white.

The Camden Fairview Cardinals compete in the 5A South Conference administered by the Arkansas Activities Association (AAA) in interscholastic teams for football, boys basketball, girls basketball, baseball, softball, and volleyball.

Fairview High School won the boys state basketball championship in 1983. As Camden High School, the boys golf team has won eight state championships between 1972 and 1984, including four consecutive titles (1972, 1973, 1974, 1975). The girls track and field teams have won eight state track titles (1993, 1998, 2005–06, 2010–13) including four consecutive banners (2010, 2011, 2012, 2013) coached by Carlos Tucker. The boys track and field teams have lifted the state championship trophy six times between 1948 and 1974. They also were state champions in 2005. The Lady Cardinal Basketball team took home the school's first girls state championship in 2007 completing the season undefeated at 31-0 coached by Ronald Rogers and took state over Morrilton and Shekinna Strickland once again in 2008. In 2009, the Cardinals football team were the runner-up in the 5A state football championship. In 2012, the Cardinal football team won the 5A State Championship.

== Notable alumni ==
- Shawn Andrews, American football offensive lineman for the New York Giants
- Stacy Andrews, American football offensive lineman for the Seattle Seahawks
- Clarence Elmo Bell, principal, school superintendent, and long-serving state senator who led on education policy
- Jonathan Davis (baseball), MLB player
- Andre Patterson, American football defensive line coach for the Minnesota Vikings
- Gary Wilson (1970s pitcher), MLB player
