= Frank Spooner =

William Franklin "Frank" Spooner
- Born: September 9, 1937 (age 89); Stephens, Ouachita County; Arkansas, USA
- Education: Stephens High School Southern Arkansas University University of Oklahoma
- Occupations: Oil and natural gas producer
- Political party: Republican nominee for Louisiana's 5th congressional district, 1976
- Spouse(s): Mary Flippo Spooner (married 1961-2025, her death)
- Children: Shannon Holloway Chelsea Haskew; Catherine Bradley Suzanne Spooner (deceased)
- Parent(s): Harry, Sr., and Willie Green Spooner

Notes
- Source information for image of Frank Spooner

William Franklin Spooner, known as Frank Spooner (born September 9, 1937), is an oil and natural gas producer in Monroe in Ouachita Parish in northeastern Louisiana, who has been active since the early 1970s in his state's Republican Party. In the fall of 1976, Spooner waged a strong but losing race for the United States House of Representatives for Louisiana's 5th congressional district in a bid to succeed incumbent Otto Passman, who had been unseated in the Democratic primary by farmer/businessman Jerry Huckaby, then from Ringgold in Bienville Parish. Therefore, instead of facing Passman, as he had expected, Spooner competed with Huckaby for a relatively rare open seat in the state's congressional delegation.

== Background ==
Spooner's father, Harry Spooner, Sr. (1893–1964), originally from Buffalo, New York, was injured in France during World War I. The senior Spooner came to Texas with the petroleum industry and settled in Arkansas, first El Dorado, then Smackover, and finally Stephens in Ouachita County, where he married the former Willie Green (1905–2000). Frank Spooner was born in Stephens and graduated in 1955 from Stephens High School. For two years thereafter he attended Southern Arkansas University in Magnolia and then transferred to the University of Oklahoma at Norman, from which in 1960 he received a Bachelor of Science degree in Petroleum Land Management. After college, Spooner served in the United States Army and the Army Reserves, Pre-Vietnam War. He worked for Humble Oil Company from 1960 to 1965.

After several years in Shreveport, Spooner moved to Monroe in 1967, and entered into a partnership with his brother, Harry Spooner, Jr. They discovered several natural gas fields in Northeast Louisiana. After 1971 Spooner operated under his own name until 1980, when he formed Spirit Petroleum Company. The company name was changed to Mark V Petroleum Company in 1997. Over the years these entities were successful in developing additional gas and oil fields, including the first commercial coal seam methane gas production in Louisiana in 2004.

In 1971, Spooner was the chairman of the Ouachita Parish Young Republicans and directed the Monroe-area campaign of the party's gubernatorial nominee, David C. Treen, an attorney then from Metairie in Jefferson Parish. Treen was defeated in this first bid for governor by Democrat Edwin Edwards. Later in 1972, Treen was elected to the U.S. House, and four years thereafter, Spooner sought to join Treen in Congress when he opposed Jerry Huckaby for the seat Otto Passman was compelled to vacate. Treen left Congress in 1980, when he was inaugurated as the first Republican governor of Louisiana since Reconstruction.

== 1976 congressional campaign ==
Spooner was the first Republican in seventy-six years even to contest the Fifth District seat. The previous GOP candidate, Henry E. Hardtner of LaSalle Parish, had polled a mere 628 votes (9.2 percent) in 1900 against the Democrat Joseph E. Ransdell of Lake Providence in East Carroll Parish, who was elected with 6,172 votes (90.8 percent). Hardtner later became a Democrat and served in the Louisiana State Legislature. Ransdell thereafter served in the United States Senate until he was unseated in the 1930 primary election by Governor Huey Pierce Long, Jr.

In preparation for his race and when he expected to face Passman, Spooner attended a Republican candidate training school in Washington, D.C. The Republican National Committee sent John Bruce Hildebrand, former editor of the party's First Monday newsletter who had written speeches for vice-presidential candidate Bob Dole, to work on Spooner's behalf. Jennie Carroll Casey, a reporter at the time for The Monroe News Star, worked as an unpaid public relations specialist.

Top-name Republicans, including former Governors Ronald W. Reagan of California and John B. Connally, Jr., of Texas, later rivals for the party's presidential nomination in 1980, came into the sprawling district, with a large agricultural component, to urge voters to elect Spooner. Connally lashed out at the increased power of the Democratic Caucus of the U.S. House, which he maintained had undermined the influence of the more moderate party members, such as then U.S. Senator Russell B. Long of Louisiana. Connally did not know Spooner, but he had known Mrs. Spooner, the former Mary Flippo (c. 1924–2025), when she was a child in the Connally neighborhood in Fort Worth in the 1950s. Mrs. Spooner was the wedding director at the First United Methodist Church in Monroe, sang in the church choir for forty years, and served as parliamentarian for the Louisiana Federation of Republican Women. Reagan and Connally gave the race a high profile and helped to provide critical financial support for Spooner. Reagan appeared in Monroe, Louisiana and Connally in West Monroe and Natchitoches, the oldest city in the state. Huckaby, who like Spooner was a political newcomer, nevertheless developed effective television advertising critical of out-of-state politicians trying to influence voters in an otherwise unnoticed Louisiana district.

Spooner hoped to poll convincing majorities in urban areas of the district to offset expected losses in rural regions, where voting Republican was still comparatively rare at the time except for the presidential level on occasion. He aimed particularly at winning in his own Monroe and West Monroe as well as Natchitoches, Ruston, Bastrop, and Winnfield. The general election turnout was more than double that of the Passman-Huckaby race because, while Huckaby and Spooner sought the House seat, in the same November 2 election, Jimmy Carter and the unelected incumbent, Gerald R. Ford, Jr., were the nominees for U.S. president.

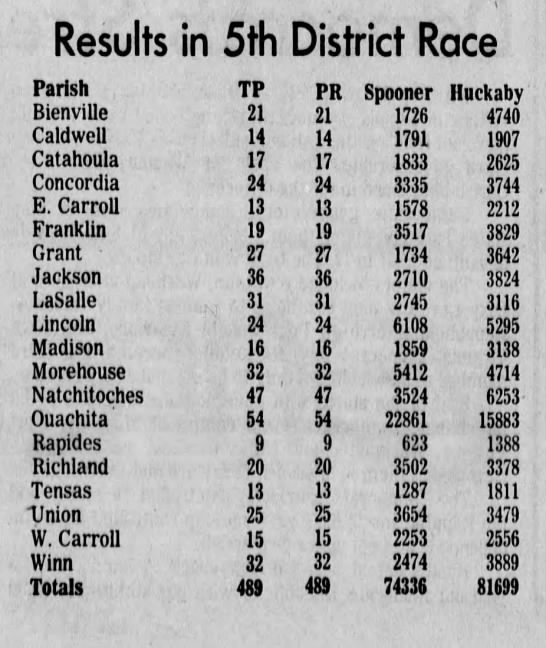
Election Day Returns By Parish in 1976 Congressional Election for Louisiana's 5th District

After his primary defeat, Passman "threatened" to endorse Spooner in the general election, but he never did so. Passman had run mostly without opposition after his initial primary victory in 1946, when he had unseated Charles E. McKenzie. He was unopposed in his last successful election on November 5, 1974. Passman was particularly known as a critic of foreign aid programs and a supporter of farm subsidies and the recently concluded Vietnam War.

Carter's statewide victory in Louisiana (and in nine other former Confederate states) worked to Huckaby's advantage. Huckaby received 83,696 votes (52.5 percent); Spooner, 75,574 ballots (47.5 percent). Spooner surpassed Passman's primary showing by 35,000 votes, which translated only into a 0.2 percent gain over Passman's primary share of the vote because of the much larger turnout in the general election in contrast to the primary. Spooner polled 59 percent in Ouachita Parish and also won in the parishes of Lincoln (Ruston), Morehouse (Bastrop), Union (Farmerville, and Richland (Rayville), but his strength was insufficient to overcome large Democratic margins stretching from Huckaby's Bienville Parish on the west to Madison Parish (Tallulah) on the northeast, Concordia Parish (Vidalia) on the southeast, and the most northern precincts of Rapides Parish (Alexandria) on the south. Spooner received just 27 percent in Bienville Parish and less than 40 percent in Madison and Winn parishes, the latter the ancestral home of the Long political faction.

== Later political activities ==
Right after his congressional campaign, Spooner became the Louisiana Republican National Committeeman. He did not seek office again though he remained active in the GOP. In 1979, Spooner was uncommitted between Treen and U.S. Representative Henson Moore of Baton Rouge, who then held Louisiana's 6th congressional district, as the Republican choice for governor. His stance brought criticism from his predecessor as national committeeman, the Treen aide John H. Cade, Jr., of Alexandria. In 1983, Spooner was chairman of the Platform Committee for the Louisiana State Republican Convention that nominated Treen for the re-election as Governor. In 1984, Spooner spearheaded an unsuccessful movement to draft Dave Treen to run against Senator J. Bennett Johnston, Jr., for the US Senate. Spooner was also chairman of security for the 1984 Republican National Convention in Dallas. In 1986, Spooner devised an effective "Get Out The Vote" plan that has been used by a number of Northeast Louisiana Republicans to win elective offices. In 1996, Spooner was the campaign chairman of John Cooksey's successful bid to become Congressman from Louisiana's 5th Congressional District.

Spooner found himself at odds with Treen and Cade in 1985 regarding the removal of State Party Chairman George Despot of Shreveport. Spooner, and then State Representative Charles D. Lancaster, Jr., of Jefferson Parish, stood with Despot, whom Spooner called "the best chairman we ever had". Such divisions hurt the state party in 1986, when Henson Moore opposed Democrat John Breaux in the U.S. Senate race to succeed Russell Long, who retired after thirty-eight years in office. Spooner later said that Moore's defeat for the Senate was his own "greatest disappointment" in politics.

Over the years, Spooner has supported Governor Bobby Jindal, U.S. Senator David Vitter, elected as Breaux's successor in 2004, and Representative Rodney Alexander, who held the seat that Spooner contested from 2003 to 2013, by which time the district had expanded far south into Rapides and Avoyelles parishes and even into the Florida Parishes east of Baton Rouge. In 2004, Spooner contributed to Alexander's unsuccessful intraparty rival, former State Representative Jock Scott of Alexandria. In 2007, Spooner donated to the presidential campaign of former Governor Mike Huckabee of Arkansas.

== Personal life ==
Spooner is a United Methodist and a donor to the Louisiana Methodist Children's Home orphanage in Monroe. He was a member of the Optimist Club. He and his wife have three daughters and eight grandchildren.

Preceded by John H. Cade, Jr.	Louisiana Republican National Committeeman William Franklin Spooner; 1977–1985	Succeeded by Bryan Wagner
