= Fort Southerland =

Historic site in Arkansas, United States

- U.S. National Register of Historic Places
- U.S. National Historic Landmark District – Contributing property
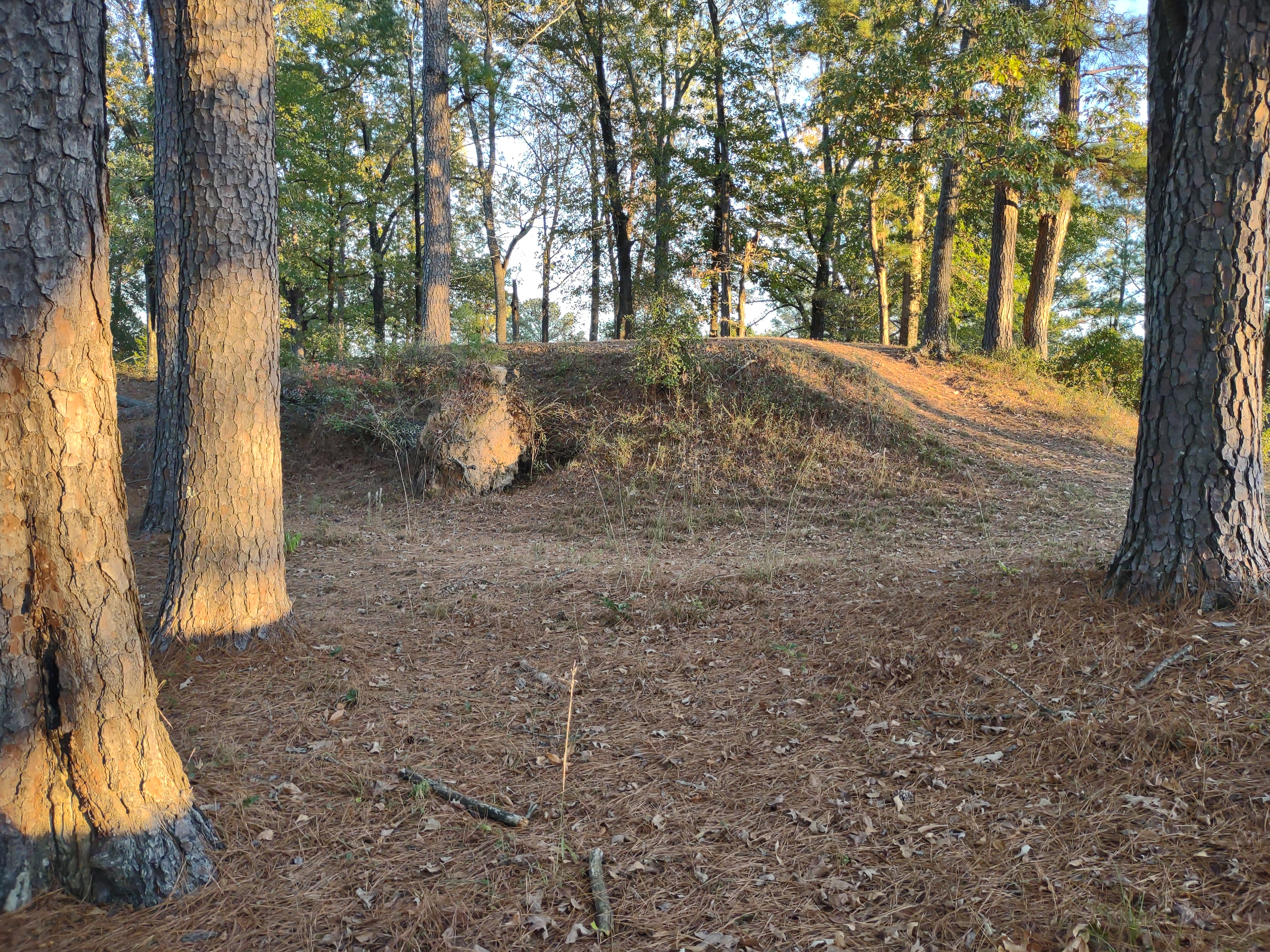
- Fort Southerland Park in 2022

- Location within Arkansas Location within the United States
- Location: Camden, Arkansas
- Coordinates: 33°34′26″N 92°49′05″W
- Built: 1864
- Part of: Camden Expedition Sites (ID94001182)
- NRHP reference No.: 94001184

Significant dates
- Added to NRHP: April 19, 1994
- Designated NHLDCP: April 19, 1994

Fort Southerland, also known as Redoubt E and Fort Diamond, is a redoubt built during the American Civil War to protect Camden, Arkansas, United States. Confederate forces, assisted by slave labor, built it along with four other redoubts in early 1864 after a Union victory in the Little Rock campaign the previous year. A roughly oval irregular octagon in plan, it mounted three cannon. When Union forces captured Camden in April 1864 during the Camden Expedition, they improved the defenses of the five redoubts, which were not sufficient for proper defense of the city. After the Confederates retook Camden later that month, they continued to improve the city's defenses.

The fort lies within Fort Southerland Park, a municipal park dedicated in 1974. It was listed on the National Register of Historic Places in 1994, and is part of the Camden Expedition Sites National Historic Landmark. Along with Fort Lookout (Redoubt A), it is one of only two redoubts around Camden still in existence.

== History ==
=== Construction ===
In 1863, during the American Civil War, Union Army forces captured Little Rock, Arkansas. The defeated Confederates then withdrew to Camden, Arkansas, which was along the Ouachita River. Towards the end of the year, Confederate General E. Kirby Smith ordered a series of forts built around Camden, in hopes of deterring a Union assault. Brigadier General Alexander T. Hawthorn, a pre-war resident of the area, was tasked with planning the defenses, although he lacked experience in military engineering. Slave labor and hundreds of soldiers were used to build the positions. In all, between January and April 1864, five positions were constructed. They are generally referred to as forts but, according to historian William L. Shea, are more accurately termed redoubts due to their smaller size.

One of these redoubts was Redoubt E. It has been known by the name of Fort Southerland, although Shea states that the accuracy of this identification is questionable, and historian Mark K. Christ notes that local sources suggest that Redoubt D was known as Fort Southerland and Redoubt E's true name was Fort Diamond. Redoubt E was constructed south of Camden and was intended to guard against a Union crossing of the Ouachita from south of town, although this possibility was considered to be unlikely. The position covered the Bradley Ferry Road, which connected Camden with Confederate-occupied Monticello and Warren. It was more than 1 mile (1.6 km) southeast of the other redoubts, and was constructed on a hilltop in what Shea refers to as "splendid isolation". Made of earth and described in its National Register of Historic Places nomination form as "roughly oval-shaped", the fort mounted three cannons, although the other four redoubts could emplace more. The position was also defended by a ditch. The area was mostly cleared of trees during the 1864 periods of work, but as of 1993 there were several trees at the site, which contributed to erosion prevention.

=== Camden Expedition ===
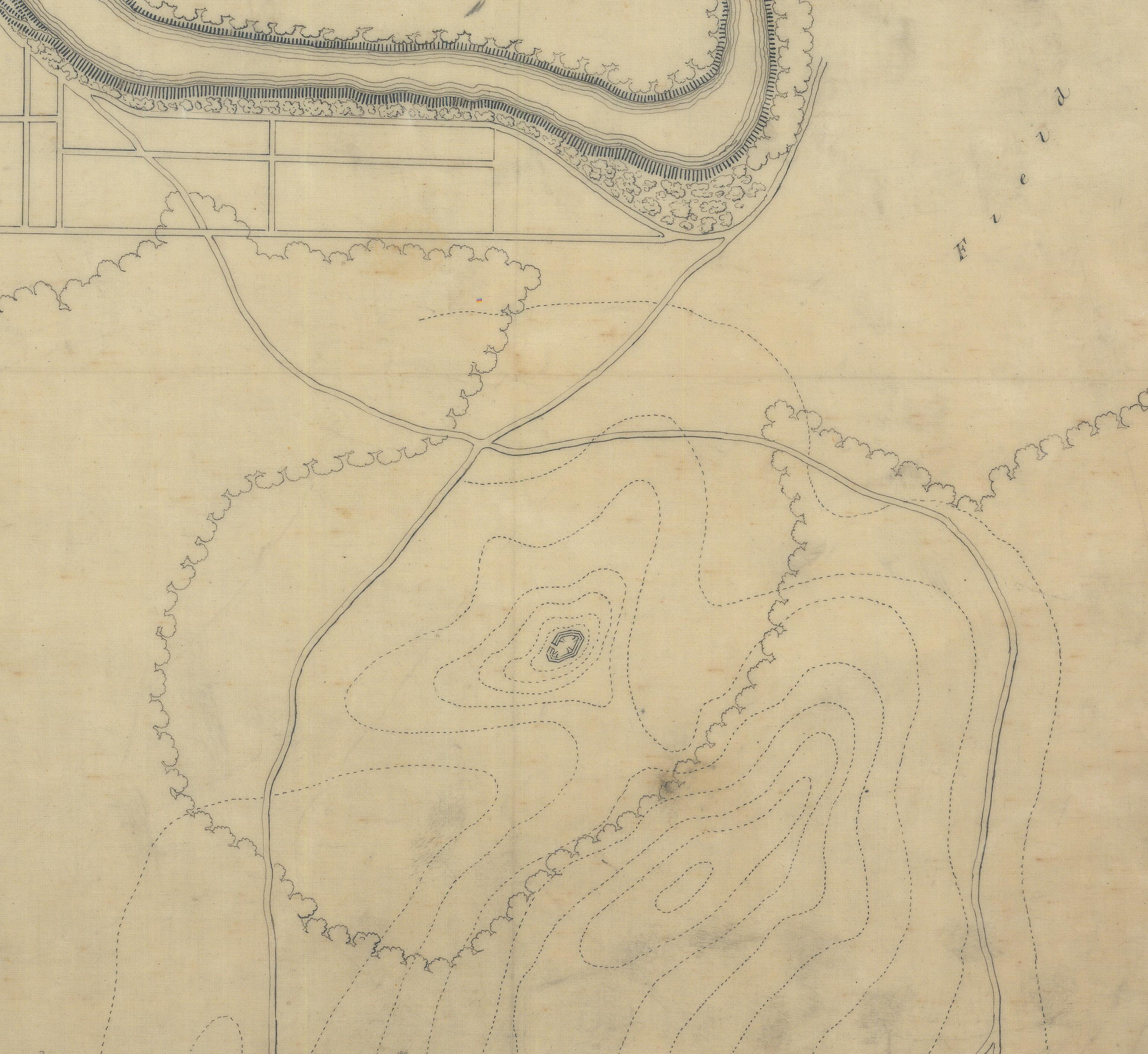
Fort Southerland as depicted in an 1864 military map produced during the Union occupation of Camden

In early 1864, Union Major General Frederick Steele learned about the Confederate fortifications at Camden, and when beginning the Camden Expedition in March decided to veer to the west and move through Arkadelphia instead to avoid the positions at Camden. Steele had intentions of attacking the Confederate-held city of Shreveport, Louisiana. To respond to the Union offensive, Confederate Major General Sterling Price moved his troops out of Camden to confront Steele. After the Battle of Prairie D'Ane, Steele decided that supply problems would prevent him from taking Shreveport, and decided to capture Camden instead; his men reached it on April 15. The city's defenses were not occupied at this time, as Price had moved his men towards Washington, where both he and Smith expected the Union attack to strike. Upon reaching Camden, the Union troops found that the Confederate positions were not particularly strong: the five redoubts were too small, too far apart, and were not connected by trenches. In places, the field of fire of the positions was limited by incomplete clearing, and enemy troops could advance under the cover of forests.

While Steele's command occupied Camden, Union supply trains were captured in the battles of Poison Spring and Marks' Mills, and Confederate forces feinted against Camden. Steele decided that the defenses of Camden needed improvements and, beginning on April 23, had his men construct trenches and rifle pits. The Union forces withdrew on April 26, as they were running out of food and Steele had learned that the Red River campaign had ended in a Union defeat. The Confederates re-occupied Camden and did further work on the fortifications, including building the Camden Water Battery. A line of trenches connecting the redoubts was completed in late 1864. The post-occupation Confederate work may have been done simply to keep idle troops busy.

=== Postwar ===
The remains of three of the redoubts were obliterated in the postwar period. One was covered over by urban development in the early 1900s, another is now a cemetery, and the rough site of one has been the location of a water tower since before 1982. The fourth, Redoubt A, also known as Fort Lookout, was partially destroyed in the 1960s when a house was built on it. Part of the line of trenches survived into the early 1970s. Redoubt E was well south of the city when it was constructed, but Camden's growth expanded towards the north and west sides of the site. Fort Southerland Park, a 5.5-acre (2.2 ha) municipal park containing the remains of the fort, was dedicated in 1974. A 1987 request to add Fort Southerland Park to the Arkansas state park system was not acted on, lack of funds and manpower to take on new units and the small size of the park being reasons for the refusal.

Both Fort Southerland and Fort Lookout were part of the National Historic Landmark (NHL) multiple listing nomination for the Camden Expedition Sites National Historic Landmark in 1993. Fort Southerland itself was listed on the National Register of Historic Places and as part of the Camden Expedition Sites NHL on April 19, 1994. Describing the destruction of much of the earthworks at Camden and other points in Arkansas, Shea finds it "sad to note how little has survived". Christ considers that Fort Southerland and the remains of Fort Lookout are "remarkably well-preserved". The NHL nomination form describes Fort Southerland as having "excellent integrity of setting, feeling, association, and location" and that it "represents an excellent preserved example of urban Civil War defensive earthworks". As part of the park, the site is publicly accessible and is marked with interpretative signage. Picnic areas have been developed there.

== See also ==
- Arkansas in the American Civil War
- List of National Historic Landmarks in Arkansas
- National Register of Historic Places listings in Ouachita County, Arkansas
