= Village, Arkansas =

Unincorporated community in Arkansas, US

Coordinates: 33°15′48″N 93°03′15″W

Village is an unincorporated village in Columbia County, Arkansas.

== History ==
A post office called Village was established in 1888, and remained in operation until 2002. An old variant name was "Machine". The origin of the name "Machine" is obscure.

== Education ==
Magnolia School District operates area public schools. The Village School District consolidated into the Magnolia district on July 1, 1986.
