= Laneburg, Arkansas =

- Unincorporated community
- Location within Arkansas Location within the United States
- Coordinates: 33°41′06″N 93°20′49″W
- Country: United States
- State: Arkansas
- County: Nevada
- Elevation: 299 ft (91 m)
- Time zone: UTC-6 (Central (CST))
  - Summer (DST): UTC-5 (CDT)
- ZIP code: 71844
- Area code: 870
- GNIS feature ID: 77443

Laneburg is an unincorporated community in Nevada County, Arkansas, United States. Laneburg is located at the junction of U.S. Route 371 and Arkansas Highway 372, 8.5 miles (13.7 km) south-southeast of Prescott. Laneburg has a post office with ZIP code 71844.

== Education ==
Laneburg is served by the Nevada School District. The former Laneburg School District merged into the newly created Nevada County District on July 1, 1985.
