= Waldo School District =

Defunct school district in Arkansas, United States

Waldo School District was a school district headquartered in Waldo, Arkansas. It operated Waldo Elementary School (K-6) and Waldo High School (7-12). The bulldog was the mascot.

On July 1, 2006, it consolidated with the Magnolia School District. The Magnolia district administration did not wish to absorb the Waldo district, but the Arkansas Board of Education forced the merger with a unanimous vote.
