= Cale, Arkansas =

- Town
- Location of Cale in Nevada County, Arkansas.
- Coordinates: 33°37′32″N 93°14′33″W
- Country: United States
- State: Arkansas
- County: Nevada

Area
  - Total: 1.05 sq mi (2.73 km^{2})
  - Land: 0.97 sq mi (2.50 km^{2})
  - Water: 0.089 sq mi (0.23 km^{2})
- Elevation: 299 ft (91 m)

Population (2020)
  - Total: 73
  - Estimate (2025): 74 ▲
  - Density: 75.6/sq mi (29.19/km^{2})
- Time zone: UTC-6 (Central (CST))
  - Summer (DST): UTC-5 (CDT)
- ZIP code: 71828
- Area code: 870
- FIPS code: 05-10480
- GNIS feature ID: 2405360
- Website: www.calearkansas.gov

Cale is a town in Nevada County, Arkansas, United States. The population was 73 at the 2020 census. It is part of the Hope Micropolitan Statistical Area.

The town was named after Cale Wardell.

== Geography ==
According to the United States Census Bureau, the town has a total area of 2.8 km^{2} (1.1 sq mi), of which 2.5 km^{2} (0.97 sq mi) is land and 0.2 km^{2} (0.077 sq mi) (8.33%) is water.

== Demographics ==
Historical population
Census	Pop.	Note	%±
1980	110		—
1990	70		−36.4%
2000	75		7.1%
2010	79		5.3%
2020	73		−7.6%
2025 (est.)	74	▲	1.4%
U.S. Decennial Census; 2014 Estimate

As of the census of 2000, there were 75 people, 30 households, and 21 families residing in the town. The population density was 29.5 people/km^{2} (76 people/mi^{2}). There were 40 housing units at an average density of 15.8 units/km^{2} (41 units/mi^{2}). The racial makeup of the town was 97.33% White and 2.67% Black or African American.

There were 30 households, out of which 23.3% had children under the age of 18 living with them, 70.0% were married couples living together, 3.3% had a female householder with no husband present, and 26.7% were non-families. 26.7% of all households were made up of individuals, and 6.7% had someone living alone who was 65 years of age or older. The average household size was 2.50, and the average family size was 3.05.

In the town, the population was spread out, with 20.0% under the age of 18, 9.3% from 18 to 24, 25.3% from 25 to 44, 32.0% from 45 to 64, and 13.3% who were 65 years of age or older. The median age was 43 years. For every 100 females, there were 87.5 males. For every 100 females age 18 and over, there were 93.5 males.

The median household income in the town was $39,063, and the median family income was $58,438. Males had a median income of $29,375 versus $37,500 for females. The per capita income for the town was $21,611. There were 8.7% of families and 11.0% of the population living below the poverty line, including 11.1% of under eighteens and none of those over 64.

== Infrastructure ==
=== Highways ===
- Arkansas Highway 200

== Education ==
Nevada School District serves the area.

On July 1, 1985 Cale School District merged into the Nevada County School District.
