= Rosston, Arkansas =

- Town
- Location of Rosston in Nevada County, Arkansas.
- Coordinates: 33°35′16″N 93°16′47″W
- Country: United States
- State: Arkansas
- County: Nevada

Area
  - Total: 4.44 sq mi (11.51 km^{2})
  - Land: 4.42 sq mi (11.45 km^{2})
  - Water: 0.023 sq mi (0.06 km^{2})
- Elevation: 354 ft (108 m)

Population (2020)
  - Total: 272
  - Estimate (2025): 263 ▼
  - Density: 61.5/sq mi (23.75/km^{2})
- Time zone: UTC-6 (Central (CST))
  - Summer (DST): UTC-5 (CDT)
- ZIP code: 71858
- Area code: 870
- FIPS code: 05-61040
- GNIS feature ID: 2407249
- Website: cityofrosston.municipalimpact.com

Rosston is a town in south-central Nevada County, Arkansas, United States. As of the 2020 census, Rosston had a population of 272. It is part of the Hope Micropolitan Statistical Area.

== Geography ==
According to the United States Census Bureau, the town has a total area of 11.6 km^{2} (4.5 mi^{2}), of which 11.5 km^{2} (4.4 mi^{2}) is land and 0.1 km^{2} (0.04 mi^{2}) (0.45%) is water.

== Demographics ==
Historical population
Census	Pop.	Note	%±
1880	57		—
1980	274		—
1990	262		−4.4%
2000	265		1.1%
2010	261		−1.5%
2020	272		4.2%
2025 (est.)	263	▼	−3.3%
U.S. Decennial Census

=== 2020 census ===
Rosston, Arkansas – Racial and ethnic composition Note: the US Census treats Hispanic/Latino as an ethnic category. This table excludes Latinos from the racial categories and assigns them to a separate category. Hispanics/Latinos may be of any race.
Race / Ethnicity (NH = Non-Hispanic)	Pop 2000	Pop 2010	Pop 2020	% 2000	% 2010	!% 2020
White alone (NH)	111	96	89	41.89%	36.78%	32.72%
Black or African American alone (NH)	153	162	154	57.74%	62.07%	56.62%
Native American or Alaska Native alone (NH)	0	0	6	0.00%	0.00%	2.21%
Asian alone (NH)	0	0	1	0.00%	0.00%	0.37%
Native Hawaiian or Pacific Islander alone (NH)	0	0	0	0.00%	0.00%	0.00%
Other race alone (NH)	0	0	0	0.00%	0.00%	0.00%
Mixed race or Multiracial (NH)	0	2	8	0.00%	0.77%	2.94%
Hispanic or Latino (any race)	1	1	14	0.38%	0.38%	5.15%
Total	265	261	272	100.00%	100.00%	100.00%

=== 2000 census ===
As of the census of 2000, there were 265 people, 95 households, and 72 families residing in the town. The population density was 23.0/km^{2} (59.5/mi^{2}). There were 118 housing units at an average density of 10.2/km^{2} (26.5/mi^{2}). The racial makeup of the town was 41.89% White, 57.74% Black or African American, 0.38% from other races. 0.38% of the population were Hispanic or Latino of any race.

There were 95 households, out of which 42.1% had children under the age of 18 living with them, 54.7% were married couples living together, 15.8% had a female householder with no husband present, and 24.2% were non-families. 22.1% of all households were made up of individuals, and 12.6% had someone living alone who was 65 years of age or older. The average household size was 2.79 and the average family size was 3.28.

In the town, the population was spread out, with 31.7% under the age of 18, 9.4% from 18 to 24, 30.2% from 25 to 44, 15.1% from 45 to 64, and 13.6% who were 65 years of age or older. The median age was 31 years. For every 100 females, there were 103.8 males. For every 100 females age 18 and over, there were 92.6 males.

The median income for a household in the town was $27,500, and the median income for a family was $36,250. Males had a median income of $27,708 versus $18,750 for females. The per capita income for the town was $11,957. About 20.7% of families and 26.2% of the population were below the poverty line, including 28.6% of those under the age of eighteen and 32.5% of those 65 or over.

== Infrastructure ==
=== Highways ===
- U.S. Highway 371
- U.S. Highway 278
- Arkansas Highway 200

== Education ==
=== Public Schools ===
Public education for elementary and secondary school students is provided by the Nevada School District, which leads to graduation from Nevada High School. As of the 2014–2015 school year, the district encompasses 345.15 square miles (893.9 km2) of land, supports more than 400 students, and employs more than 80 educators and staff at its two schools and district offices

Nevada School District includes the following school facilities:

- Nevada Elementary School, serving kindergarten through grade 6.
- Nevada High School, serving grades 7 through 12.

== Notable person ==
- Thomas Chipman McRae, United States House of Representatives (1885 to 1903), 26th governor of Arkansas.

== See also ==
- List of cities and towns in Arkansas
