= .wps =

.wps is a file extension used for:

- WPS Office Writer files
- Microsoft Works, files
- Rockbox, while playing screen files
- World Programming System program files
