= Camden Fairview School District =

School district in Arkansas, United States

Location
- 625 Clifton Street; Camden, Arkansas 71701-9775 United States

District information
- Grades: PK–12
- Superintendent: Tara Armstrong
- Accreditation: Arkansas Department of Education
- Schools: 5
- NCES District ID: 0506060

Students and staff
- Students: 2,539
- Teachers: 177.05 (on FTE basis)
- Staff: 443.05 (on FTE basis)
- Student–teacher ratio: 14.34
- District mascot: Fighting Cardinals
- Colors: Red; White

Other information
- Website: cfsd.k12.ar.us

Camden Fairview School District No. 16 (CFSD) is a public school district based in Camden, Arkansas, United States. The school district encompasses 333.93 square miles (864.9 km^{2}) of land including all or portions of several Ouachita County communities.

It service area includes Camden, Chidester, and Stephens, as well as a portion of Reader. In the 2013–2014 school year the district had 2,437 students.

The district is accredited by the Arkansas Department of Education (ADE) and by AdvancED.

== History ==
The Chidester School District consolidated into the Fairview School District on July 1, 1987. The Camden School District merged into the Fairview School District on October 16, 1990.

The Arkansas Board of Education voted to dissolve the Stephens School District in April 2014. The portion in Ouachita County, including Stephens, was assigned to Camden Fairview, affecting about 140 students. Camden Fairview took ownership of the Stephens district buildings in Stephens. According to Mike McNeill of the Magnolia Reporter, the expected outcome was that the Camden Fairview district would give the Stephens school property to the Stephens city government.

== Schools ==
Secondary schools:

- Camden Fairview High School, serving students in grades 9 through 12.
- Camden Fairview Middle School, serving students in grades 6 through 8.

Elementary schools:

- Ivory Intermediate School, serving students in grades 4 and 5.
- Fairview Elementary School, serving students in grades K through 3.

Preschool:

- Early Childhood Education Center, serving 3 and 4 year olds.

Former schools:

- Camden Fairview Intermediate School (now the ECEC)
- Fairview Junior High School
- Chidester Elementary School
  - It occupied the former Chidester Public School, a high school building, and was established in 1987. Its school facility was built in 1968.
- Whiteside Elementary School
