= Camden, Arkansas =

- City and County seat
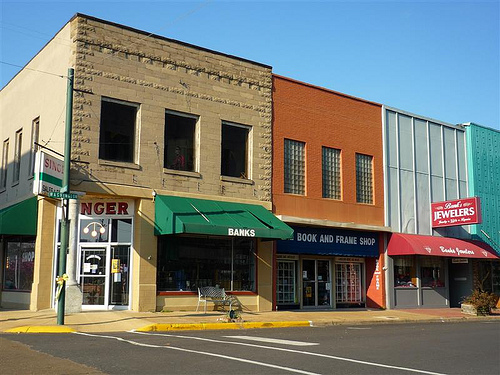
- Downtown Camden (2009)

- Council logo
- Motto: "Star of the River"
- Location in Ouachita County and the state of Arkansas
- Coordinates: 33°35′4″N 92°50′3″W
- Country: United States
- State: Arkansas
- County: Ouachita
- Township: Ecore Fabre, Lafayette
- Incorporated: December 11, 1844 (181 years ago)

Government
  - Type: Mayor–Council

Area
  - Total: 16.62 sq mi (43.04 km^{2})
  - Land: 16.53 sq mi (42.80 km^{2})
  - Water: 0.093 sq mi (0.24 km^{2})
- Elevation: 102 ft (31 m)

Population (2020)
  - Total: 10,612
  - Estimate (2025): 10,127 ▼
  - Density: 642.1/sq mi (247.93/km^{2})
- Time zone: UTC−06:00 (CST)
  - Summer (DST): UTC−05:00 (CDT)
- ZIP codes: 71701, 71711
- Area code: 870
- FIPS code: 05-10720
- GNIS feature ID: 2403976
- Website: www.explorecamden.com

Camden is a city in and the county seat of Ouachita County in the south-central part of the U.S. state of Arkansas. As of the 2020 census, the population of the city was 10,612, down from its 2010 population of 12,183. The city is located approximately 100 miles south of Little Rock. It is situated on bluffs overlooking the Ouachita River, the city developed because of the river.

The recorded history began in 1782 when a Spanish military post was established on the site of an old French trading post called Écore à Fabri. When Ouachita County was formed in 1842, American settlers changed the name to Camden. The city became an important port during the steamboat era when Camden became known as the “Queen City” of the Ouachita. In 1864, Camden became the unintended focus of the Red River Campaign, a major Civil War effort resulting in several significant battles.

== History ==
=== European exploration ===
The explorers Father Jacques Marquette and Louis Joliet in 1673 and René-Robert Cavelier, Sieur de La Salle, in 1682 established French claims to the land they called Louisiana, which included what would become Camden, and found the Quapaw living at the confluence of the Arkansas and Mississippi rivers. The Quapaw claimed the territory that included this part of the Ouachita basin, but it was also influenced by both Caddo trade and culture. The old Indian trail called the Caddo Trace, leading from the Quapaw villages on the Arkansas River to those of the Caddo on the Red River, crossed the Ouachita River at what is now Camden. French hunters, trappers, and traders, who were drawn to the area by the abundant game, later established a rendezvous point on the high bluff above the crossing. The place became known as Ecore a Fabri or Fabri's Bluff (later spelled Fabre).

In late 1762, France ceded Louisiana to Spain. In 1782, the Spanish governor sent a Frenchman named Jean Baptiste Filhiol, known to him as Don Juan Filhiol, to establish a civil and military post in the Ouachita district. Filhiol first chose to locate his headquarters at Ecore a Fabri with the expectation of creating a settlement there. After about two years, he decided to move downriver to the more central site of Prairie des Canots, present-day Monroe, Louisiana. These locations were noted in 1804 by the Hunter-Dunbar Expedition that explored the Ouachita River.

=== Early statehood ===
By 1819, Jesse Bowman, of future Alamo fame, was living at Ecore a Fabri, while the Tate brothers—Andrew, Richard, and George—came up the Ouachita on keelboats. Unable to go farther, they settled up river at a place now called Tate's Bluff. In 1824, John Nunn moved to Ecore a Fabri and became one of the early permanent settlers. The Nunn brothers planned to pole freight and passengers upriver toward Washington, Arkansas. Steamboats arrived at Ecore a Fabri in the 1820s and provided it with a direct link to the cotton and commercial markets in New Orleans. Because it was located at the head of practical navigation, Ecore a Fabri became a commercial center and began to grow. Residents of Hempstead County began petitioning for a new road in 1821, and by 1828, the Camden to Washington Road was having additional work and maintenance done. By 1829, a large portion of Hempstead County, including Ecore a Fabri, was broken off by the legislature to form an expanded Union County. In 1842, Ouachita County, named for the river, was formed from the northwest portion of Union. Ecore a Fabri was chosen as the county seat, and its name was changed to Camden at the suggestion of one of the commissioners, Thomas Woodward.

Camden soon became the second-largest city in Arkansas. It was a mercantile center and a bustling river port served by frequent scheduled steamboats carrying passengers and freight. Most traveled between Camden and New Orleans. Camden was also the headquarters for John T. Chidester's stagecoach line that served Arkansas, Louisiana and Texas. Chidester's company carried the United States Mail from Memphis to Fort Smith for the Butterfield stage line.

=== American Civil War ===
During the Civil War, Camden was the focus of U.S. Army general Frederick Steele’s Red River Campaign of 1864. Steele moved south of Little Rock toward Shreveport, Louisiana, but got only as far as Camden, which he occupied while the Confederates pulled back to defend Washington, Arkansas. Forts Lookout and Southerland were built early in 1864, and the Camden Water Battery was built later in the same year, all to protect Camden from attack. After losing the engagement at Poison Spring and the action at Marks’ Mill, Steele had little choice but to retreat toward Little Rock. Camden and south Arkansas remained in Confederate hands until the end of the war.

=== 20th century to present ===
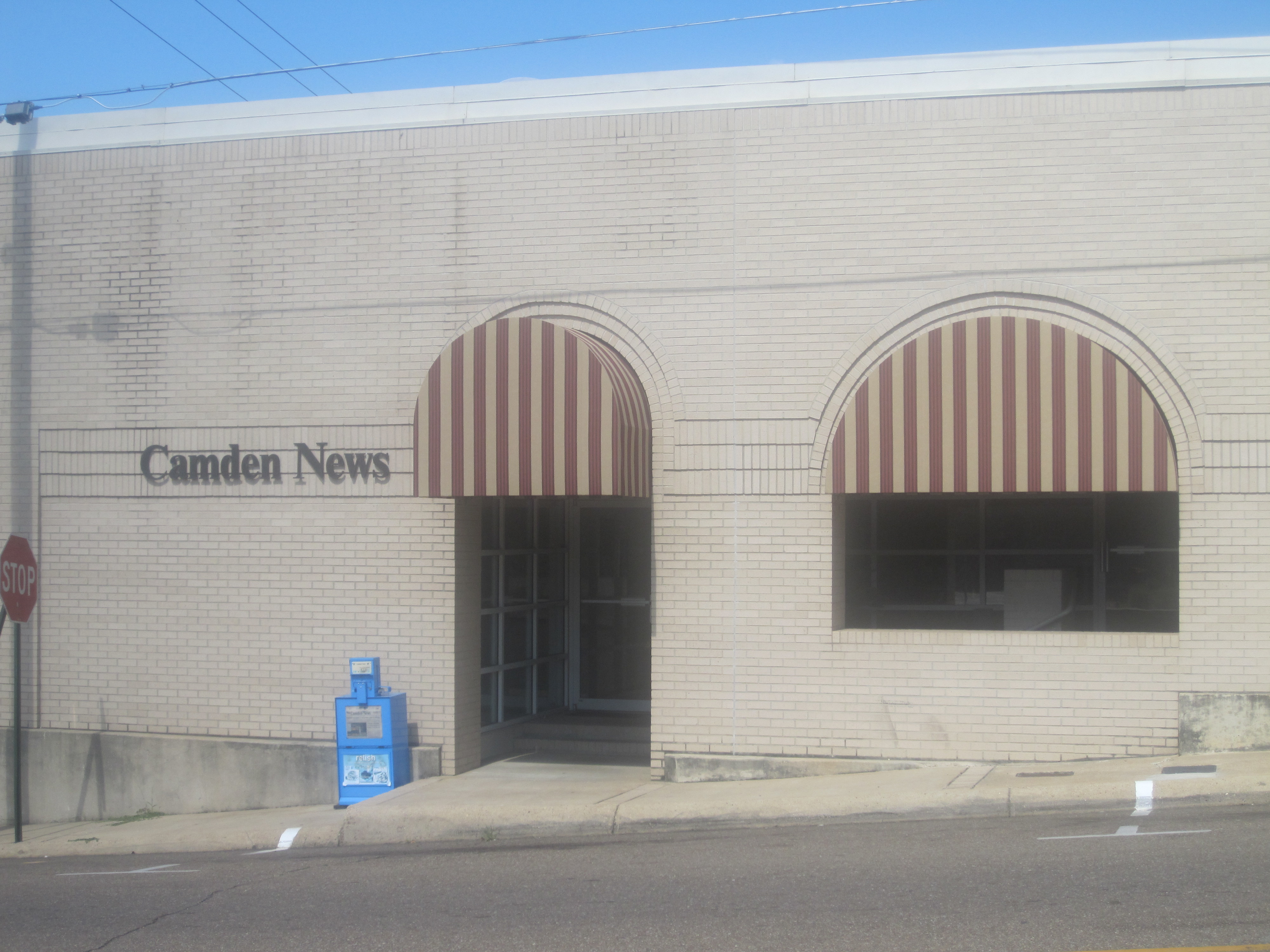
The Camden News headquarters

Before the steamboat era faded, Camden had become a railroad town—served by the mainline of the St Louis-Southwestern Railroad (Cotton Belt) and by branch lines of the Missouri Pacific and the Rock Island railroads. The town remained an important cotton shipping depot through the early decades of the twentieth century. The South Arkansas oil boom of the 1920s resulted in a thriving economy.

In 1927, the International Paper Company built a processing mill at Camden, following development of south Arkansas' lumber industry. For several decades, Camden was the headquarters of the Clyde E. Palmer newspaper chain, which included The Camden News, the Texarkana Gazette, the Hot Springs Sentinel-Record, and the Magnolia Banner-News. The daily newspaper in Camden is the original flagship publication of WEHCO Media.

Also in 1927, Camark Pottery was formed, named after its hometown and state. Initially a beautiful high-end art pottery maker, the firm switched to molded pieces during the Depression out of necessity, along with painted industrial artware; by the 1940s, the firm employed 100 people and continued to wholesale across the country through the 1970s. One of their lines were dog figurines with the label of Grapette, the soda firm which started in Camden in 1939 and was shipped throughout North and Central America from there until its sale to the Rhinegold Beer company in 1970.

During World War II, Camden was home to one of Arkansas's three contract training fields for primary pilots in the United States Army Air Forces. The base was named Harrell Field; ground was broken for it in 1942. The site became surplus to the Army's needs in 1944 and was handed over to the US Navy for the Shumaker Naval Ammunition Depot. Thousands of new jobs were created. The Korean War generated new jobs and activity at the depot, which closed after war's end. The city and county redeveloped its facilities and grounds into an extensive industrial area. This was the site of some major defense establishments and multiple smaller industries. A technical campus of Southern Arkansas University is also located there.

In the 1990s, post Cold War downsizing of the defense industry brought severe job losses—and resulting population decline—to the Camden area. The International Paper Company mill closed a few years later, resulting in more job losses. In recent years, however, a partial resurgence of defense contracts and the development of a diversified mixture of small business and professional activity have stabilized the town's economy.

Camden was the home of Buckshot Smith (1929-2024) who was America's oldest active duty police officer from 2020 until he retired in 2023.

== Geography ==
Camden is located on the Ouachita River, at the end of the navigable part of the river. According to the United States Census Bureau, the city has a total area of 16.5 square miles (43 km^{2}), of which 16.5 square miles (43 km^{2}) is land and 0.1 square miles (0.26 km^{2}) (0.36%) is water.

=== Climate ===
The climate in this area is characterized by hot summers and cool winters. According to the Köppen Climate Classification system, Camden has a humid subtropical climate, abbreviated "Cfa" on climate maps.

Climate data for Camden, Arkansas (1991–2020 normals, extremes 1890–present)
| Month | Jan | Feb | Mar | Apr | May | Jun | Jul | Aug | Sep | Oct | Nov | Dec | Year |
|---|---|---|---|---|---|---|---|---|---|---|---|---|---|
| Record high °F (°C) | 86 (30) | 89 (32) | 93 (34) | 95 (35) | 99 (37) | 107 (42) | 111 (44) | 115 (46) | 109 (43) | 102 (39) | 90 (32) | 88 (31) | 115 (46) |
| Mean maximum °F (°C) | 73.7 (23.2) | 77.1 (25.1) | 83.8 (28.8) | 87.3 (30.7) | 91.2 (32.9) | 96.4 (35.8) | 99.9 (37.7) | 100.0 (37.8) | 96.2 (35.7) | 90.2 (32.3) | 81.5 (27.5) | 74.8 (23.8) | 101.7 (38.7) |
| Mean daily maximum °F (°C) | 53.3 (11.8) | 57.9 (14.4) | 66.4 (19.1) | 74.5 (23.6) | 81.4 (27.4) | 88.8 (31.6) | 91.9 (33.3) | 92.0 (33.3) | 86.0 (30.0) | 75.7 (24.3) | 64.0 (17.8) | 55.6 (13.1) | 74.0 (23.3) |
| Daily mean °F (°C) | 42.3 (5.7) | 46.1 (7.8) | 54.1 (12.3) | 62.0 (16.7) | 70.4 (21.3) | 78.1 (25.6) | 81.5 (27.5) | 80.8 (27.1) | 74.2 (23.4) | 62.9 (17.2) | 52.0 (11.1) | 44.4 (6.9) | 62.4 (16.9) |
| Mean daily minimum °F (°C) | 31.2 (−0.4) | 34.2 (1.2) | 41.8 (5.4) | 49.6 (9.8) | 59.5 (15.3) | 67.4 (19.7) | 71.1 (21.7) | 69.7 (20.9) | 62.4 (16.9) | 50.1 (10.1) | 40.0 (4.4) | 33.3 (0.7) | 50.9 (10.5) |
| Mean minimum °F (°C) | 17.4 (−8.1) | 22.0 (−5.6) | 26.5 (−3.1) | 35.0 (1.7) | 46.1 (7.8) | 58.0 (14.4) | 64.6 (18.1) | 62.1 (16.7) | 48.3 (9.1) | 35.3 (1.8) | 25.6 (−3.6) | 21.0 (−6.1) | 15.4 (−9.2) |
| Record low °F (°C) | −10 (−23) | −10 (−23) | 12 (−11) | 26 (−3) | 35 (2) | 44 (7) | 51 (11) | 48 (9) | 33 (1) | 20 (−7) | 12 (−11) | 1 (−17) | −10 (−23) |
| Average precipitation inches (mm) | 4.33 (110) | 4.67 (119) | 5.43 (138) | 5.36 (136) | 4.55 (116) | 3.52 (89) | 4.11 (104) | 3.18 (81) | 3.53 (90) | 4.80 (122) | 4.17 (106) | 5.47 (139) | 53.12 (1,349) |
| Average snowfall inches (cm) | 0.9 (2.3) | 0.3 (0.76) | 0.3 (0.76) | 0.0 (0.0) | 0.0 (0.0) | 0.0 (0.0) | 0.0 (0.0) | 0.0 (0.0) | 0.0 (0.0) | 0.0 (0.0) | 0.0 (0.0) | 0.0 (0.0) | 1.5 (3.8) |
| Average precipitation days (≥ 0.01 in) | 9.4 | 8.5 | 9.1 | 7.8 | 8.7 | 7.3 | 7.2 | 6.1 | 5.7 | 7.0 | 7.7 | 8.8 | 93.3 |
| Average snowy days (≥ 0.1 in) | 0.3 | 0.2 | 0.1 | 0.0 | 0.0 | 0.0 | 0.0 | 0.0 | 0.0 | 0.0 | 0.1 | 0.0 | 0.7 |
Source: NOAA

== Demographics ==
Historical population
| Census | Pop. | Note | %± |
|---|---|---|---|
| 1850 | 894 | | — |
| 1860 | 2,219 | | 148.2% |
| 1870 | 1,612 | | −27.4% |
| 1880 | 1,503 | | −6.8% |
| 1890 | 2,571 | | 71.1% |
| 1900 | 2,840 | | 10.5% |
| 1910 | 3,995 | | 40.7% |
| 1920 | 3,238 | | −18.9% |
| 1930 | 7,273 | | 124.6% |
| 1940 | 8,975 | | 23.4% |
| 1950 | 11,372 | | 26.7% |
| 1960 | 15,823 | | 39.1% |
| 1970 | 15,147 | | −4.3% |
| 1980 | 15,356 | | 1.4% |
| 1990 | 14,380 | | −6.4% |
| 2000 | 13,154 | | −8.5% |
| 2010 | 12,183 | | −7.4% |
| 2020 | 10,612 | | −12.9% |
| 2025 (est.) | 10,127 | ▼ | −4.6% |
U.S. Decennial Census

Camden is the principal city of the Camden Micropolitan Statistical Area, which includes all of Ouachita and Calhoun counties.

Racial and ethnic composition

Camden, Arkansas – Racial and ethnic composition Note: the US Census treats Hispanic/Latino as an ethnic category. This table excludes Latinos from the racial categories and assigns them to a separate category. Hispanics/Latinos may be of any race.
| Race / Ethnicity (NH = Non-Hispanic) | Pop 2000 | Pop 2010 | Pop 2020 | % 2000 | % 2010 | 2020 |
|---|---|---|---|---|---|---|
| White alone (NH) | 6,405 | 4,876 | 3,851 | 48.69% | 40.02% | 36.29% |
| Black or African American alone (NH) | 6,475 | 6,805 | 5,943 | 49.22% | 55.86% | 56.00% |
| Native American or Alaska Native alone (NH) | 29 | 35 | 13 | 0.22% | 0.29% | 0.12% |
| Asian alone (NH) | 49 | 62 | 80 | 0.37% | 0.51% | 0.75% |
| Pacific Islander alone (NH) | 2 | 2 | 2 | 0.02% | 0.02% | 0.02% |
| Other race alone (NH) | 10 | 13 | 22 | 0.08% | 0.11% | 0.21% |
| Mixed race or Multiracial (NH) | 108 | 198 | 449 | 0.82% | 1.63% | 4.23% |
| Hispanic or Latino (any race) | 76 | 192 | 252 | 0.58% | 1.58% | 2.37% |
| Total | 13,154 | 12,183 | 10,612 | 100.00% | 100.00% | 100.00% |

=== 2020 census ===
As of the 2020 census, Camden had a population of 10,612 in 4,657 households, including 2,523 family households.

The median age was 40.8 years. 23.5% of residents were under the age of 18 and 19.9% were 65 years of age or older. For every 100 females, there were 85.7 males, and for every 100 females age 18 and over, there were 80.9 males age 18 and over.

91.3% of residents lived in urban areas, while 8.7% lived in rural areas.

Of households in the city, 27.4% had children under the age of 18 living in them. Of all households, 30.1% were married-couple households, 21.3% were households with a male householder and no spouse or partner present, and 42.8% were households with a female householder and no spouse or partner present. About 38.4% of all households were made up of individuals, and 15.5% had someone living alone who was 65 years of age or older.

There were 5,552 housing units, of which 16.1% were vacant. The homeowner vacancy rate was 2.6%, and the rental vacancy rate was 12.9%.

=== 2010 census ===
As of the 2010 United States census, there were 12,183 people living in the city. The racial makeup of the city was 55.9% Black, 40.0% White, 0.3% Native American, 0.5% Asian, <0.1% Pacific Islander, 0.1% from some other race and 1.6% from two or more races. 1.6% were Hispanic or Latino of any race.

=== 2000 census ===
As of the census of 2000, there were 13,154 people, 5,421 households, and 3,561 families living in the city. The population density was 799.4 inhabitants per square mile (308.7/km^{2}). There were 6,259 housing units at an average density of 380.4 units per square mile (146.9 units/km^{2}). The racial makeup of the city was 48.88% Black or African American, 49.41% White, 0.37% Asian, 0.24% Native American, 0.02% Pacific Islander, 0.20% from other races, and 0.87% from two or more races. 0.58% of the population were Hispanic or Latino of any race.

There were 5,421 households, out of which 30.0% had children under the age of 18 living with them, 42.6% were married couples living together, 19.4% had a female householder with no husband present, and 34.3% were non-families. 31.5% of all households were made up of individuals, and 16.0% had someone living alone who was 65 years of age or older. The average household size was 2.36 and the average family size was 2.97.

In the city, the population was spread out, with 26.2% under the age of 18, 8.1% from 18 to 24, 24.6% from 25 to 44, 21.7% from 45 to 64, and 19.4% who were 65 years of age or older. The median age was 39 years. For every 100 females, there were 82.0 males. For every 100 females age 18 and over, there were 76.4 males.

The median income for a household in the city was $27,814, and the median income for a family was $35,291. Males had a median income of $31,257 versus $19,046 for females. The per capita income for the city was $14,599. About 18.5% of families and 22.5% of the population were below the poverty line, including 32.0% of those under age 18 and 19.4% of those age 65 or over.

== Economy ==
=== Tourism ===
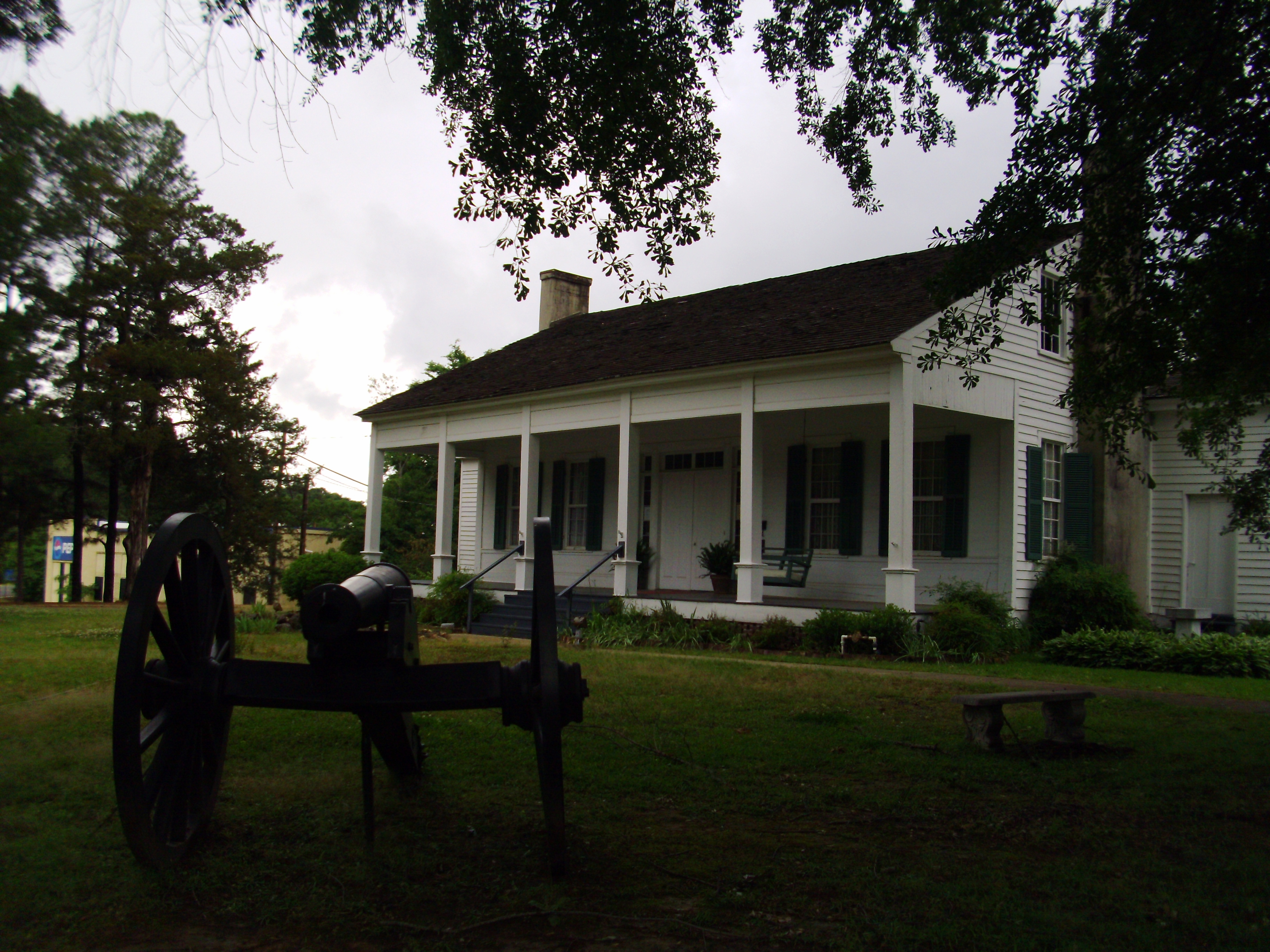
The McCollum-Chidester House

Attractions in town include the McCollum-Chidester House, home to the Ouachita County Historical Society. Built in 1847 by local merchant Peter McCollum, the house was purchased by John T. Chidester in 1857 and was used as a way station on his stage line. It was featured in the television series North and South.

Camden has numerous historic buildings. There are two National Register districts. The Clifton and Greening Streets Historic District was created in 1997, and the Washington Street Historic District in 2010. The old Camden Post Office, built 1895, was added to the register in 1977. It is now a popular restaurant. The oldest continually running restaurant in the state of Arkansas is also located in Camden. The White House Cafe was opened in 1907 by Hristos Hodjopulas.

== Education ==
African American kid attended Lincoln middle School during segregation. It was closed in 1978 after Brown v. Board of Education disallowed segregation.

Camden was once served by Camden School District and Fairview School District. In 1990 the two districts merged. Public education for early childhood, elementary and secondary education is available from the following school districts:

- Camden Fairview School District, including Camden Fairview High School.
- Harmony Grove School District, including Harmony Grove High School.

== Notable people ==
- Shawn Andrews (born 1982); played for Philadelphia Eagles and NY Giants
- Stacy Andrews (born 1981); played for Cincinnati Bengals, Philadelphia Eagles, Seattle Seahawks, NY Giants
- Jonathan Davis (born 1992), played in minor leagues, on Jay's major league roster 2019
- Betty Jo Dobbs (1930–1994), science historian specializing in Newton's Alchemy
- David Warner Hagen (1931–2022), United States District Court judge
- Alexander Hawthorn (1825–1899); American lawyer, minister, C.S. Army general
- George Hays (1863–1927), 24th governor of Arkansas 1913–1917
- James Hildreth (born 1956); President and CEO of Meharry Medical College
- Benjamin Laney (1896–1977), 33rd governor of Arkansas 1945–1949
- Ne-Yo (born 1979 as Shaffer Chimere Smith); R&B singer, songwriter, producer
- Andre Patterson (born 1960); line coach (NFL) 1997–2006, with Minnesota Vikings since 2014
- David Pryor (1934–2024); U.S. Representative, 39th governor of Arkansas, U.S. Senator.
- Tony Tillman (born 1981 as Tony Daniel Frazier), Christian hip hop artist and songwriter
- Tommy Tuberville (born 1954); U.S. senator from Alabama, college football coach
- Edward A. Warren (1818–1875) politician represented Ouachita County in the Arkansas House of Representatives and United States House of Representatives
- Gertrude Weaver (1898–2015); declared oldest living documented person, but died five days later on April 6, 2015
- Corey Williams (born 1980); played for Green Bay Packers, Cleveland Browns, and Detroit Lions

== See also ==
- List of cities and towns in Arkansas
- National Register of Historic Places listings in Ouachita County, Arkansas
