= Magnolia School District (Arkansas) =

School district in Arkansas

Address
- 1400 High School Drive Magnolia, Arkansas, 71753; United States

District information
- Type: Public
- Grades: PreK–12
- NCES District ID: 0500044

Students and staff
- Students: 2,693
- Teachers: 219.19
- Staff: 212.41
- Student–teacher ratio: 12.29

Other information
- Website: www.magnoliaschools.net

Magnolia School District is a public school district based in Magnolia, the county seat of Columbia County, Arkansas. It serves Magnolia, Village, McNeil, and Waldo. In the 2013-2014 school year the district had 2,746 students.

== History ==
The Village School District consolidated into the Magnolia district on July 1, 1986. The Walker School District consolidated into the Magnolia district on July 1, 2004. The Waldo School District consolidated into the Magnolia district on July 1, 2006. The Waldo district administration did not wish to consolidate into the Magnolia district, but the Arkansas Board of Education forced the merger with a unanimous vote.

The Arkansas Board of Education voted to dissolve the Stephens School District in 2014, and the portion in Columbia County, serving McNeil and the surrounding area, was given to the Magnolia School District. About 160 students were reassigned to Magnolia schools as a result.

== Schools ==
Secondary education:

- Magnolia High School, serving grades 10 through 12.
- Magnolia Junior High School, serving grades 7 through 9.

Early childhood and elementary education:

- Central Elementary School, serving grades 4 through 6.
- Eastside Elementary School, serving grades 1 through 3.
- Eastside Kindergarten Center, serving kindergarten.
- Walker Pre-K Center, serving prekindergarten.
