= Walker School District =

Defunct school district in Arkansas, United States

Walker School District No. 33 or Walker Public Schools (WPS) was a school district headquartered in Columbia County, Arkansas. It operated the Walker School.

On July 1, 2004, it consolidated with the Magnolia School District.
