= Stephens School District =

Defunct school district in Arkansas, United States

Stephens School District 13 was a school district in headquartered in Stephens, Arkansas, serving sections of Ouachita, Columbia, and Nevada counties. It served Stephens and McNeil.

The district's final superintendent was Patsy Hughey. The district was dissolved effective July 1, 2014, with portions in each of the counties given to the Camden Fairview School District, the Magnolia School District, and the Nevada School District.

Its schools were Stephens Elementary School and Stephens High School, serving grades Kindergarten through 6 and 7 through 12, respectively. In 2009 these schools had 190 students and 158 students, respectively, with a combined total of 348. At the time the district had 75 employees, including 39 certified employees and 32 classified employees.

== History ==
On July 1, 2004, the McNeil School District consolidated into the Stephens School District. According to the Stephens school district's attorney, Clay Fendley, there was, in the words of Mike McNeill of the Magnolia Reporter, "bitterness" resulting from the McNeil consolidation.

=== Dissolution ===
In the 2010–2011, 2011–2012, 2012–2013, and 2013–2014 school years, respectively, the district had 355, 333, 344, and 314 students. Under Arkansas law it was required to be shut down and consolidated into a larger district because it had fewer than 350 students for two consecutive years.

Findley stated that the Stephens district failed to find another school district that was willing to consolidate with Stephens. The Stephens district had until March 1, 2014, to voluntarily consolidate. Since no voluntary merger was arranged, the Arkansas Board of Education was to determine whether and how the Stephens district would be consolidated or dissolved. Findley asked the board to have the district consolidated with the Nevada County School District in an effort to keep the Stephens School campus open. Whitney Moore, a lawyer representing the Camden Fairview School District, the Magnolia School District, and the Nevada School District, instead advocated for breaking the Stephens district into three parts and giving one part to each of those three districts. The state board opted against keeping the Stephens district together and instead pursued a plan to break the district into three parts; this meant the Stephens School would not have enough students to remain open. McNeil residents favored the split-up proposal since their children could go to school in Magnolia, which is closer to McNeil than Stephens.

In April 2014 the state education board voted 5–2 to dissolve the Stephens School District, with Alice Mahoney and Toyce Newton opposing. One board member, Joe Black, was not present for the decision.

The district was divided along county boundaries, with assets and debts given according to the area that the property was located in. The portion of the district in Ouachita County was assigned to Camden Fairview, which took ownership of the Stephens School District facilities in Stephens. The portion in Columbia County, serving McNeil and the surrounding area, was given to the Magnolia district. The portion in Nevada County was assigned to the Nevada county district. The numbers of students moved to these districts were about 140 and about 160 for the first two, respectively, while the number of students in Nevada County was smaller. The district was dissolved on July 1, 2014. According to Mike McNeill, the expected outcome was that the Camden Fairview district would give the Stephens school property to the Stephens city government.
