= Nevada School District =

School district in Arkansas, United States

Address
- 6580 U.S. Highway 278 Rosston, Arkansas, 71858; United States

District information
- Type: Public
- Grades: K–12
- NCES District ID: 0500030

Students and staff
- Students: 392
- Teachers: 37.24
- Staff: 38.4
- Student–teacher ratio: 10.53

Other information
- Website: www.nevadaschooldistrict.net

Nevada School District 1 is a public school district based in Nevada County, Arkansas. Based in Rosston along U.S. Highway 278, the school district encompasses 345.15 square miles (893.9 km^{2}) of land in the county, supports more than 400 students, and employs more than 80 educators and staff at its two schools and district offices.

In the 2013–2014 school year, the district had 362 students.

Communities in its service area include Rosston, Bodcaw, Cale, Willisville, Laneburg, and Oak Grove. A small portion of the district extends into Ouachita County.

== History ==
The Nevada County School District formed on July 1, 1985, from the merger of Bodcaw, Cale, Laneburg, Oakgrove, and Willisville school districts.

The Arkansas Board of Education voted to dissolve the Stephens School District in April 2014, and the portion in Nevada County was given to the Nevada School District. The Stephens district asked the state board to merge all of the district into the Nevada School District as a way of keeping the Stephens School open, but the state board rejected the proposal.

== Schools ==
- Nevada Elementary School, serving kindergarten through grade 6.
- Nevada High School, serving grades 7 through 12.
