= 27th Wisconsin Infantry Regiment =

Union Army infantry regiment

27th Wisconsin Volunteer Infantry Regiment
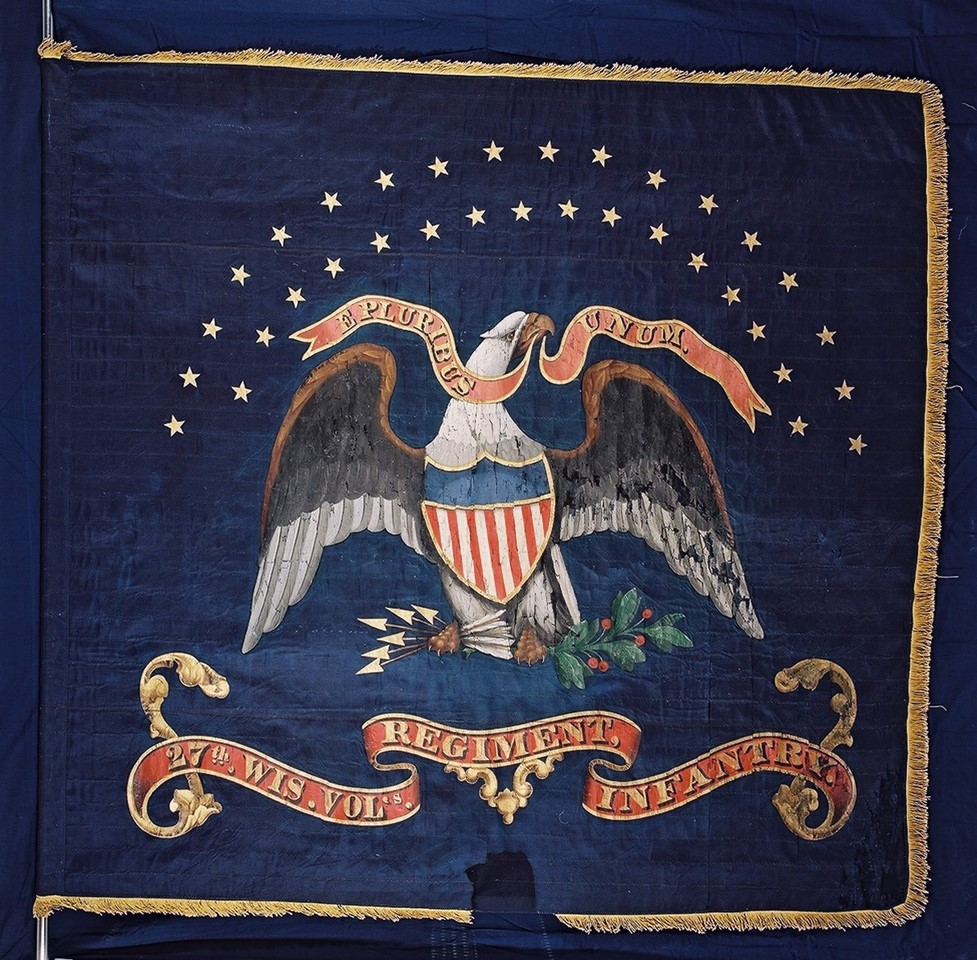
- National color of the 27th Wisconsin
- Active: March 7, 1863 – August 5, 1865
- Country: United States
- Allegiance: Union
- Branch: Infantry
- Size: 865 officers and men (initial); 585 officers and men (final)
- Engagements: American Civil War; Siege of Vicksburg; Little Rock campaign; Camden Expedition; Battle of Jenkins' Ferry; Mobile Campaign; Battle of Spanish Fort

Commanders
- Notable commanders: Conrad Krez

The 27th Wisconsin Volunteer Infantry Regiment was an infantry regiment that served in the Union Army during the American Civil War. The regiment began organizing in August 1862 but recruiting problems delayed its entry into federal service until March 1863. Predominantly from the Lake Michigan shore counties of the state, the regiment was mainly composed of German immigrants. The 27th Wisconsin played a supporting role in the Siege of Vicksburg and participated in the capture of Little Rock, Arkansas during the year. The regiment served in the Little Rock garrison and saw its first serious combat in the Camden Expedition of 1864, during which it fought in the Battle of Jenkins' Ferry. The regiment was among the Union forces in the Mobile campaign in early 1865, and was involved in the Battle of Spanish Fort. Ending the war in the occupation of Texas, the regiment was mustered out in August before returning to Wisconsin.

== Organization ==
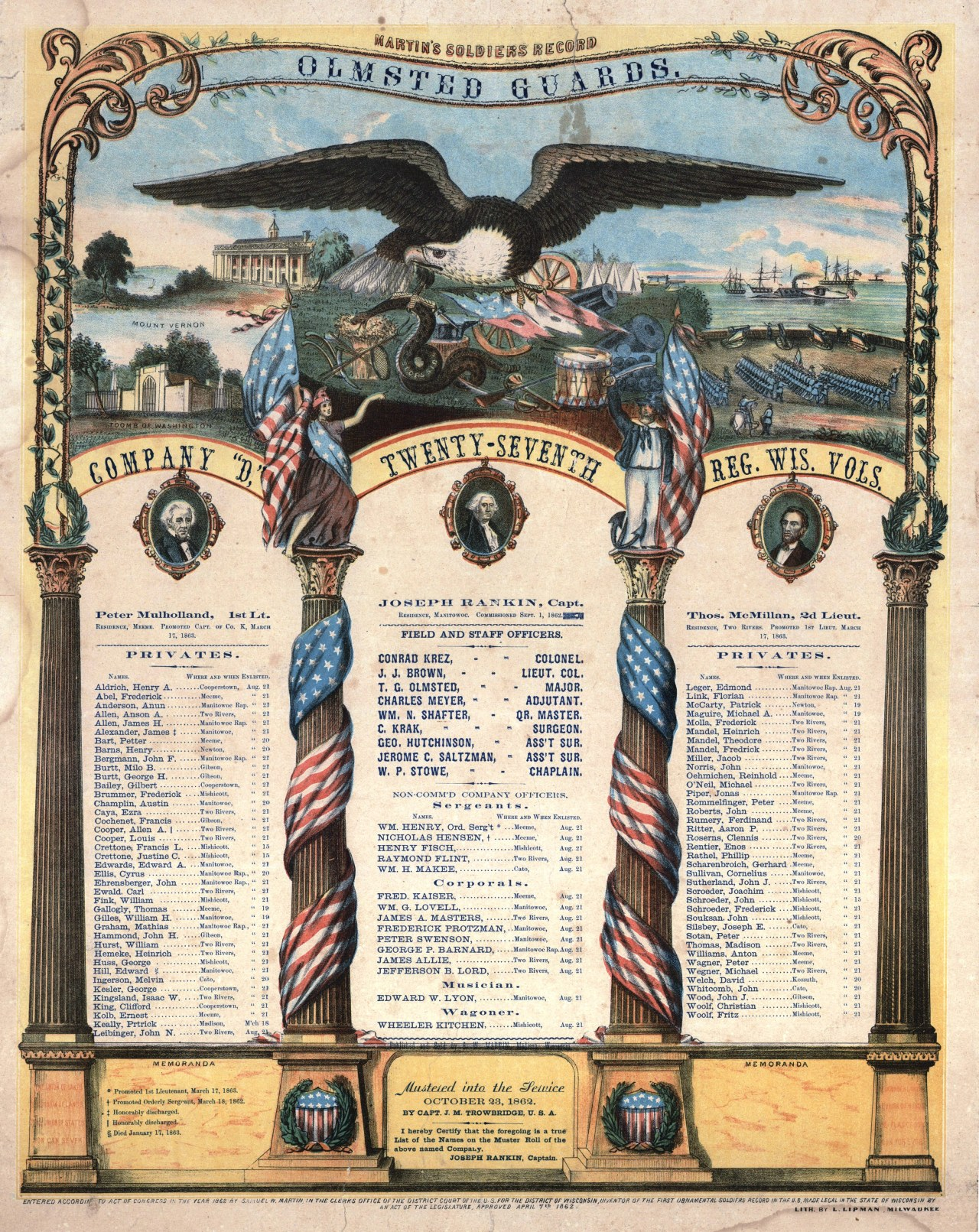
A broadside commemorating the Olmsted Guards (Company D)

The regiment was one of seven new Wisconsin regiments formed under Lincoln's 300,000-man militia draft call of August 5, 1862. The plan offered advance pay and enlistment bounties to encourage volunteering, but included a draft of the state militia if volunteer quotas were not met. By the time these incentives expired on August 22, only seven companies of the regiment had been organized mostly in Sheboygan and Manitowoc Counties. These companies were ordered to Camp Sigel at Milwaukee on September 17. The War Department authorized the recruitment of the remaining three companies, while the previously organized companies spent the winter in the city. During this period the regiment was guarded the imprisoned Ozaukee draft rioters. German immigrants formed more than half of the regiment but it also included Irishmen and the Norwegian Company H. With the last three companies organized, the regiment was mustered into federal service on March 7, 1863, under the command of Sheboygan lawyer and German Forty-Eighter Colonel Conrad Krez, and left Wisconsin for Columbus, Kentucky on March 16. John J. Brown was lieutenant colonel and Ten Eyck G. Olmsted major. The regiment had a strength of 865 officers and men upon muster. However, when the regiment passed through Chicago en route to Columbus, the Chicago Tribune reported that 52 men of the regiment were absent without leave, including thirty bounty jumpers – draft substitutes who promptly deserted after being mustered in.

Companies of the 27th Wisconsin Infantry Regiment
Company	Origins	Captains
A (Kewaunee County Guards)	Kewaunee	Charles H. Cunningham (promoted); John J. Borland
B (Plymouth Union Rifles)	Sheboygan	Erastus W. Stannard (mortally wounded); Aaron Hobart (died of disease); Julius Schlaich
C (Herman Tigers)	Sheboygan	Frederick Schnellen (resigned); Conrad F. Smith
D (Olmsted Guards)	Manitowoc	Joseph Rankin
E (Sheboygan Guards)	Sheboygan	Alfred Marschner (resigned); Carl Witte
F (Scott Union Rangers)	Sheboygan	Samuel D. Hubbard (dismissed by court martial); Josiah Platt
G (Highland Boys)	Iowa	William Wigham (resigned); James Gunn
H (Norway Bear Hunters)	Dane	Charles Corneliusen (died of disease); John A. S. Verdier
I	Lake Shore Counties	James C. Barnes
K	Lake Shore Counties	Peter Mulholland

== Vicksburg ==
The 27th Wisconsin served on garrison duty at Columbus until May 30, when it was sent to aid in the Siege of Vicksburg via Memphis. The 27th Wisconsin arrived at the mouth of the Yazoo River on June 4 and went upriver to Satartia, Mississippi. The regiment remained there for two days while Confederate artillery dueled with escorting gunboats. At Satartia, companies A, B, and C were sent out as skirmishers while the rest of the regiment remained in reserve, but they was not actively engaged. The 27th Wisconsin marched 30 miles downriver to Haines' Bluff on June 6. The exhausted Wisconites arrived the next day with many suffering from heatstroke. During the march, Captain Erastus W. Stannard of Company B was mortally wounded by the accidental discharge of a musket. The regiment was brigaded with the 25th Wisconsin and 40th Iowa in Montgomery's Brigade of Kimball's Third Division of XVI Corps. The regiment moved four miles to Snyder's Bluff on June 11, forming part of the outer siege lines. Until the Confederate surrender on July 4, the regiment performed picket duty and built fortifications and trenches there.

== Arkansas ==
Following the surrender of Vicksburg, the regiment moved to Helena, Arkansas. Transferred to Frederick Steele's Army of Arkansas on August 13, the regiment went with the army up the White River to DeValls Bluff for the Little Rock campaign. Marching to Little Rock, the regiment participated in the capture of the state capital. At Little Rock, the regiment was involved in garrison and picket duty with occasional forays into the region surrounding the city.

Part of Adolph Engelmann's 3rd Brigade of Frederick Salomon's 3rd Division of Steele's VII Corps, the 27th Wisconsin participated in the Camden Expedition. Steele's expedition aimed to link up with Nathaniel P. Banks' Red River Expedition. The regiment departed Little Rock with the force on March 23, 1864. On April 1, the troops guarding the expedition's trains came under attack near Hollywood. The 27th was detached to guard the train, which reached the camp safely. The brigade was left behind at Okolona on April 3, with it and Ritter's cavalry brigade ordered to link up with Thayer's troops at Hollywood. Before the cavalrymen arrived at Okolona, Englemann's brigade was attacked. The 27th Wisconsin repulsed the Confederates and pursued them for two miles. After Ritter's brigade arrived, Englemann continued to Hollywood and rejoined the division near Elkins' Ferry on April 5. The division left camp on the next day and moved forward behind Carr's cavalry division, encamping halfway between the Little Missouri River and the abandoned Confederate breastworks at Prairie D'Ane. The division remained there for the next three days to forage and repair the roads. The division advanced to Prairie D'Ane on April 10, emerging victorious in a skirmish and repulsing a Confederate night attack during the Battle of Prairie D'Ane. In the first ten days of the expedition between April 1 and 10, the regiment lost five killed or mortally wounded and two wounded.

Salomon resumed his advance on April 12 with minor skirmishing. The expedition continued advancing along the Camden road via Moscow, Arkansas and entered Camden on April 16. Salomon's division served on picket, provost, escort and fatigue duty during the occupation of Camden. Due to supply problems and the failure of Banks' expedition, he began retreating to Little Rock. The army left Camden with Salomon's division as its rear guard on April 26. Three days later, pursuing Confederates fired on the division at Saline Bottom. During the skirmish, Engleman's brigade, which also included the 40th Iowa, 43rd Illinois and the Springfield Light Artillery, occupied the crest of a hill and held it to cover the withdrawal of the division trains, stopping the lightly armed Confederate cavalry of Colton Greene. During the subsequent Battle of Jenkins' Ferry, the regiment was split from the rest of the brigade to reinforce the left of Rice's brigade, which had been forced back by the Confederate attack. The 27th Wisconsin and 40th Iowa counterattacked to drive back Burns' Missouri brigade. The division repulsed several attacks and was able to conduct an orderly retreat across the Saline River. At Jenkins' Ferry, the regiment lost eleven killed or mortally wounded and nine wounded. The expedition returned to Little Rock on May 3.

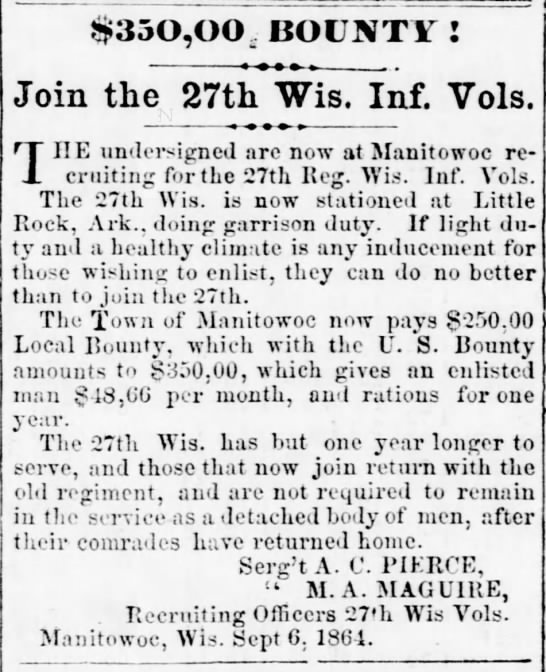
An 1864 newspaper recruiting advertisement for the regiment

The 27th Wisconsin was transferred to the 2nd Brigade of the 1st Division of VII Corps on May 14. Lieutenant Colonel Brown was discharged and replaced by Major Olmsted on May 24 with Company A Captain Charles H. Cunningham taking over Olmsted's position. In a letter home, Private Daniel Carver of Company B commented that "we would be better off" if the original officers left since these "do not amount to any great sum, in fact they are a damage to the Regt." The regiment's prolonged garrison duty at Little Rock gave it a reputation as a relatively safe unit, and in September its recruiters in Manitowoc offered a $350 bounty to volunteers with the promise of "light duty and a healthy climate." The regiment descended the Arkansas River to Pine Bluff on October 3 to reinforce the garrison, threatened by Magruder's superior forces. The regiment remained there until the danger had passed on October 22 and returned to Little Rock. Soon afterwards, Companies A, D, E, and H were detached to serve as guards on the Memphis and Little Rock Railroad west of Brownsville. Like most other Wisconsin units, the 27th overwhelmingly supported Lincoln in the 1864 presidential election, although the regiment's home counties voted for McClellan. The soldier vote helped contribute to Lincoln's majority in Wisconsin. Nevertheless, the Copperhead editor of the Manitowoc Pilot, who had earlier railed against the war as depriving the region of "its best producers for the sake of the nigger," reported that the ballots of the strongly Democratic Company D from Manitowoc had been thrown out.

== Mobile and Texas ==
For the Mobile campaign, the regiment boarded transports to depart Little Rock on February 7. Joining Edward Canby's forces at New Orleans on February 12 after the journey down the Arkansas and Mississippi Rivers, the regiment reembarked from Algiers on February 20 for the voyage to Mobile. After disembarking at Navy Cove on Mobile Bay, the regiment encamped on Mobile Point near Fort Morgan, where it was assigned to the 3rd Brigade of Benton's 3rd Division of Granger's XIII Corps on February 27. Krez was placed in command of the brigade, which also included the 33rd Iowa, 77th Ohio, and the 28th Wisconsin. Major Charles H. Cunningham became regimental commander. With Canby's army, the regiment left camp on March 17 and occupied trenches besieging Spanish Fort on March 27. The regiment lost five killed and five wounded during picket and fatigue duty before the Confederates evacuated the fort on the night of April 8. On the next morning. the 27th Wisconsin marched five miles to Fort Blakeley, arriving just as Steele's troops captured it. The fall of Fort Blakeley allowed for the capture of Mobile, ending the campaign. After marching through Mobile, the regiment rejoined the brigade at Whistler's Station on April 15, camping there for four days. Beginning on April 19, the regiment marched at least fifty miles up the Tombigbee River to McIntosh's Bluff to build fortifications. Krez remained in command of the brigade and Olmsted was recorded as regimental commander on April 30. After Confederate general Richard Taylor surrendered his forces in the region, the fortifications were rendered unnecessary and the regiment was transported back to Mobile on May 9.

After several weeks in camp near Mobile, the regiment was embarked for the voyage across the Gulf of Mexico to occupy Texas on June 1. The regiment arrived at Brazos Santiago on June 6, marching to Clarksville, opposite Bagdad at the mouth of the Rio Grande on June 13. The regiment finished its active service there conducting picket and guard duty on the Mexican border before being sent to Brownsville for mustering out on August 2. After the completion of this process, the regiment departed for home on August 29. Reaching New Orleans on September 5, the regiment was transported up the Mississippi to Cairo, Illinois, where they boarded trains on the Illinois Central Railroad to Madison. The regiment was paid off and disbanded soon after it arrived there on September 17.

== Strength and casualties ==
The 27th Wisconsin was mustered in with 865 men, and gained 24 recruits in 1863, 236 in 1864, and 68 in 1865, mustering out with 585 men. A total of 1,196 men served with the regiment. According to wartime records, 244 died, four were reported missing, 56 deserted, 57 were transferred, and 248 discharged. According to Dyer's Compendium, the regiment lost 22 men killed in action or mortally wounded, and five officers and 232 men to disease, for a total of 259 deaths.

== See also ==
- List of Wisconsin Civil War units
- Wisconsin in the American Civil War
