= Prairie D'Ane Battlefield =

- U.S. National Register of Historic Places
- U.S. National Historic Landmark District – Contributing property
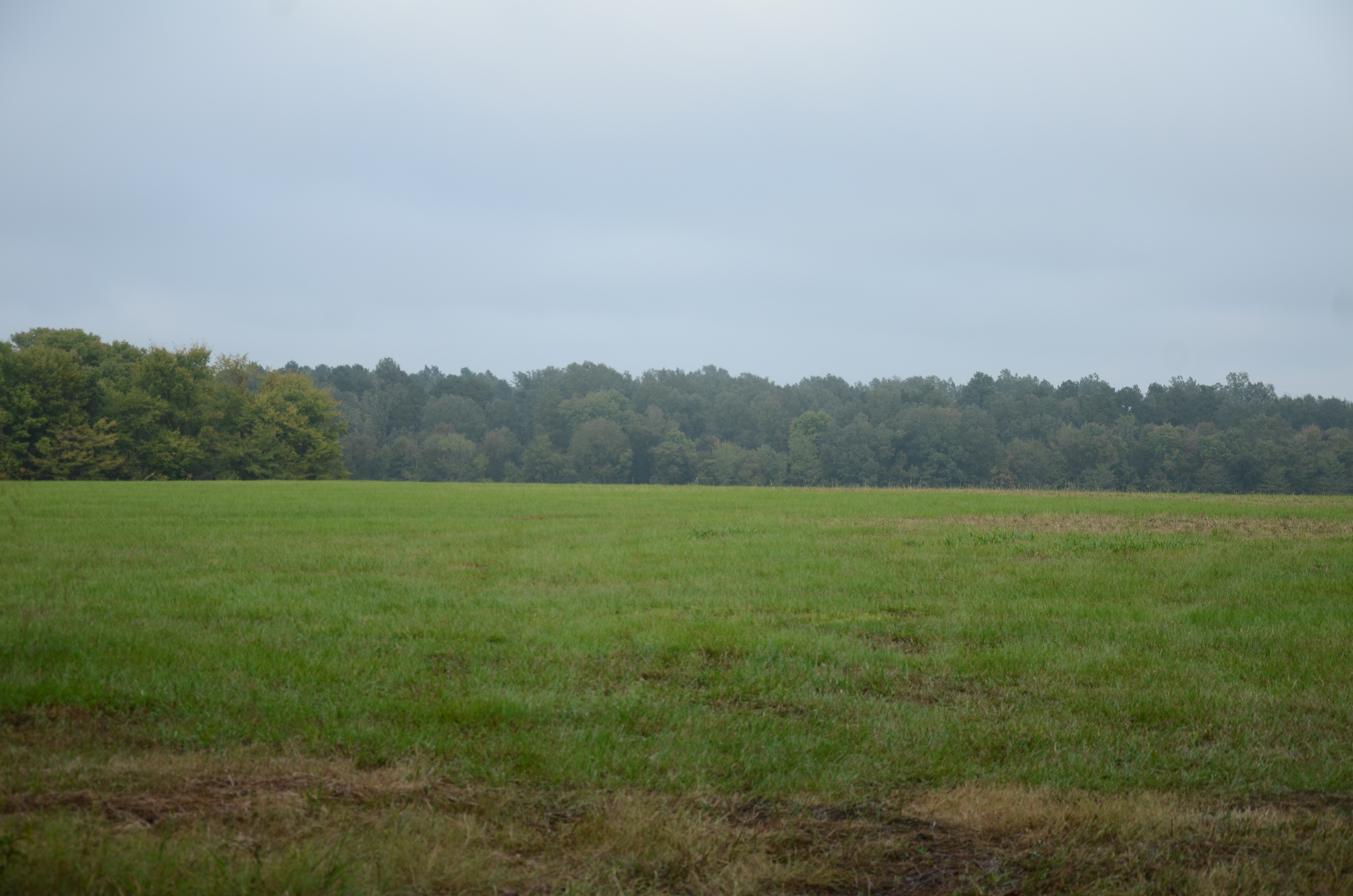

- Location within Arkansas
- Nearest city: Prescott, Arkansas
- Coordinates: 33°49′35″N 93°25′56″W
- Built: 1864
- Part of: Camden Expedition Sites (ID94001182)
- NRHP reference No.: 74000481

Significant dates
- Added to NRHP: March 22, 1974
- Designated NHLDCP: April 19, 1994

The Prairie D'Ane Battlefield, also known as Prairie D'Ann Battlefield or Prairie De Ann Battlefield in anglicized forms, was the site of the Civil War Battle of Prairie D'Ane, one of the engagements in southwestern Arkansas of the Union's Camden Expedition of 1864. It was listed on the National Register of Historic Places in 1974, and, with other sites, is part of the Camden Expedition Sites National Historic Landmark. It was declared part of the National Historic Landmark in 1994.

In February 2018 the Nevada County Depot and Museum announced it was deeded an 800-acre tract of this battlefield, which it will improve for heritage tourism. The Civil War Trust, a division of the American Battlefield Trust, acquired the acreage. Note: The Trust's website shows the parcel as 811 acres.

== History ==
The 1864 Camden Expedition was part of a two-pronged strategy by the Union Army to drive Confederate resistance out of southwestern Arkansas and northern Louisiana, and penetrated into Confederate Texas. Union Major General Frederick Steele led a Union force from Little Rock on March 23, 1864, with the objective of joining forces with Major General Nathaniel Prentice Banks at Shreveport, Louisiana. Confederate forces in Arkansas were directed from Washington, where the Confederate government of the state relocated after the fall of Little Rock. Confederate Major General Sterling Price ordered Brigadier General John S. Marmaduke to harry the Union column and to prevent it from crossing the Little Missouri River as it moved toward Washington. Advance Union forces established a beachhead on the south side of the Little Missouri on April 3, and clashed with Confederate defenders in the Battle of Elkin's Ferry. The outnumbered Confederates were forced to withdraw, and General Price established a defensive position, lightly fortified by earthworks, on the road between Elkin's Ferry and Washington at the western edge of the sparsely populated Prairie d'Ane, a roughly circular area of prairie surrounded by woodlands. General Steele delayed his advance toward Washington until April 9, awaiting the arrival of addition troops from Fort Smith.

The leading edge of Steele's force began skirmishing with Price's force on April 10, and both sides brought up reinforcements, but the Union advance was halted by fighting that lasted into the night. The next day Union forces advance across the prairie in a battle line in the afternoon, but the lateness of the march meant no general engagement took place, and the Union forces ended up returning to their camps. That night Price withdrew most of his force further down the Washington road, leaving a small guard in the entrenchments on the prairie. The Union again advanced on the 12th, prompting this rearguard to also withdraw, with Union cavalry giving chase for a time. At this point, Steele, whose forces were on half-rations, decided it was necessary to resupply his army. Instead of advancing further toward Washington, he turned toward Camden, a Confederate-held town whose defenses Price had stripped to defend Washington. Price advanced troops in pursuit of the Union army, engaging them in a rearguard skirmish near the hamlet of Moscow (now part of Prescott). Due to difficulties resupplying is force while in Camden, Steele ended up withdrawing all the way back to Little Rock.

== Battlefield ==
The main battle took place over an area estimated to cover some 5,000 acres (2,000 ha) in and around where the city of Prescott later developed after being established in 1873. Much of this area has been cultivated for agriculture, and remains lightly developed. The only major intrusion constructed since the battle is a corridor containing railroad tracks and Interstate 30. The Moscow area, where the rearguard action took place, is relatively unaltered, with some development taking place outside the known bounds of the battle area. The Moscow Methodist Church and Cemetery, a site which existed at the time of the battle, is listed on the National Register of Historic Places. (The current church is a 20th-century structure.) A land area of more than 2,600 acres (1,100 ha) was designated in 1994 as part of the Camden Expedition Sites, a National Historic Landmark District.

In February 2018, the Nevada County Depot and Museum announced acquisition of an 800-acre tract of the battlefield and planned a celebration to accept the deed. It had conducted fundraising and was aided by a grant from the American Battlefield Protection Program of the National Park Service. The American Battlefield Trust, America's largest non-profit battlefield organization, purchased the property and deeded it to the museum. (The Trust lists the parcel as containing 811 acres). The site will be prepared as a heritage tourism destination; the interpretive plan will include 412 acres of the nearby Elkin's Ferry Battlefield.

== See also ==
- List of National Historic Landmarks in Arkansas
- National Register of Historic Places listings in Nevada County, Arkansas
