= Camden Expedition Sites =

Historic district in Arkansas, United States

- U.S. National Register of Historic Places
- U.S. National Historic Landmark District
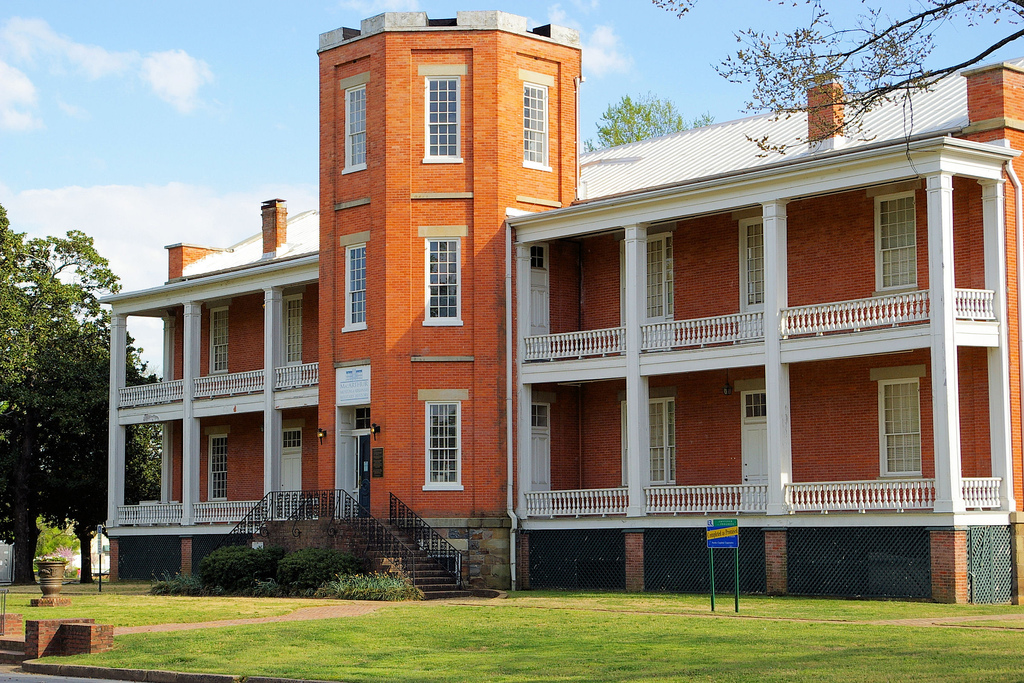
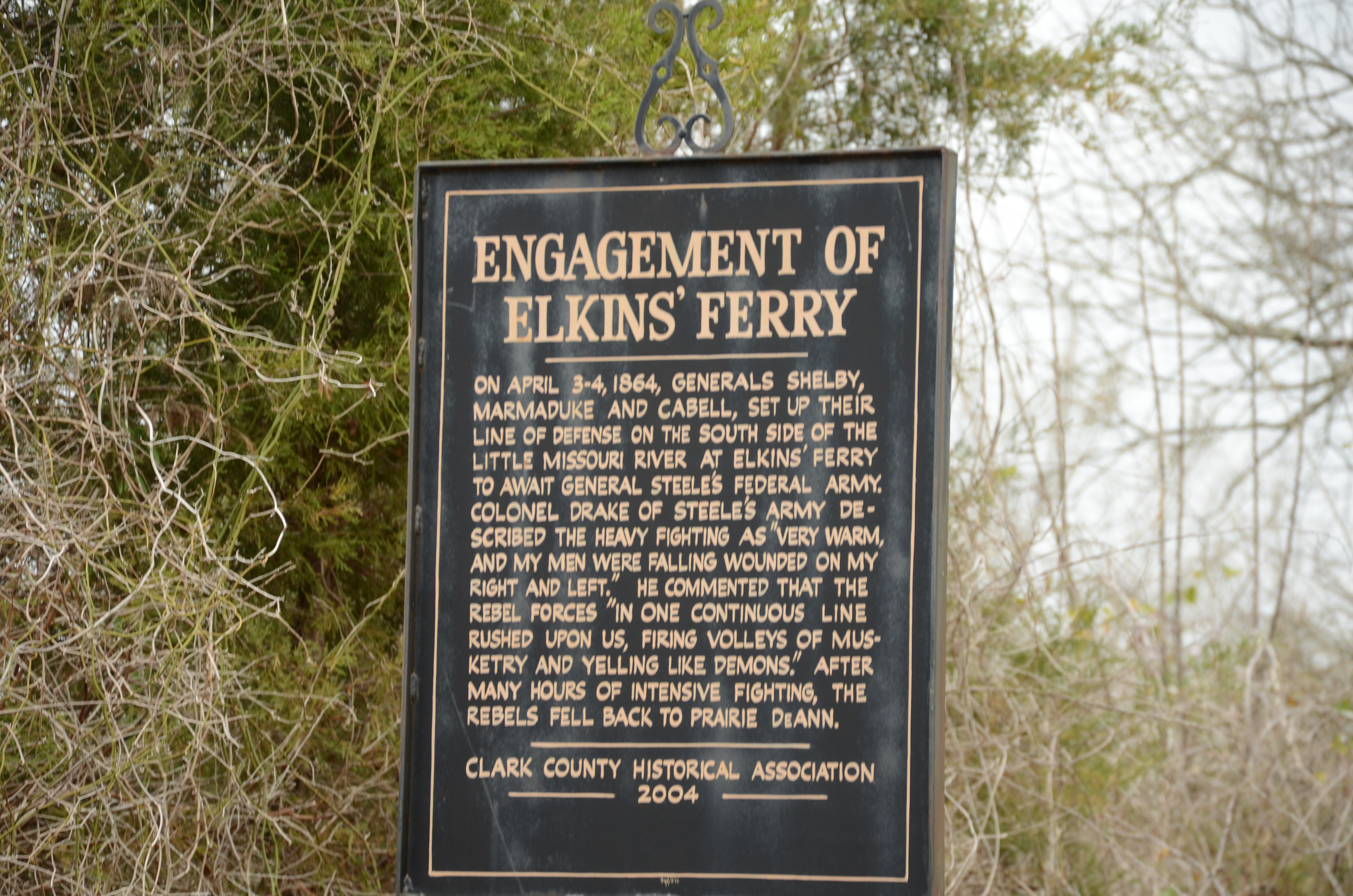
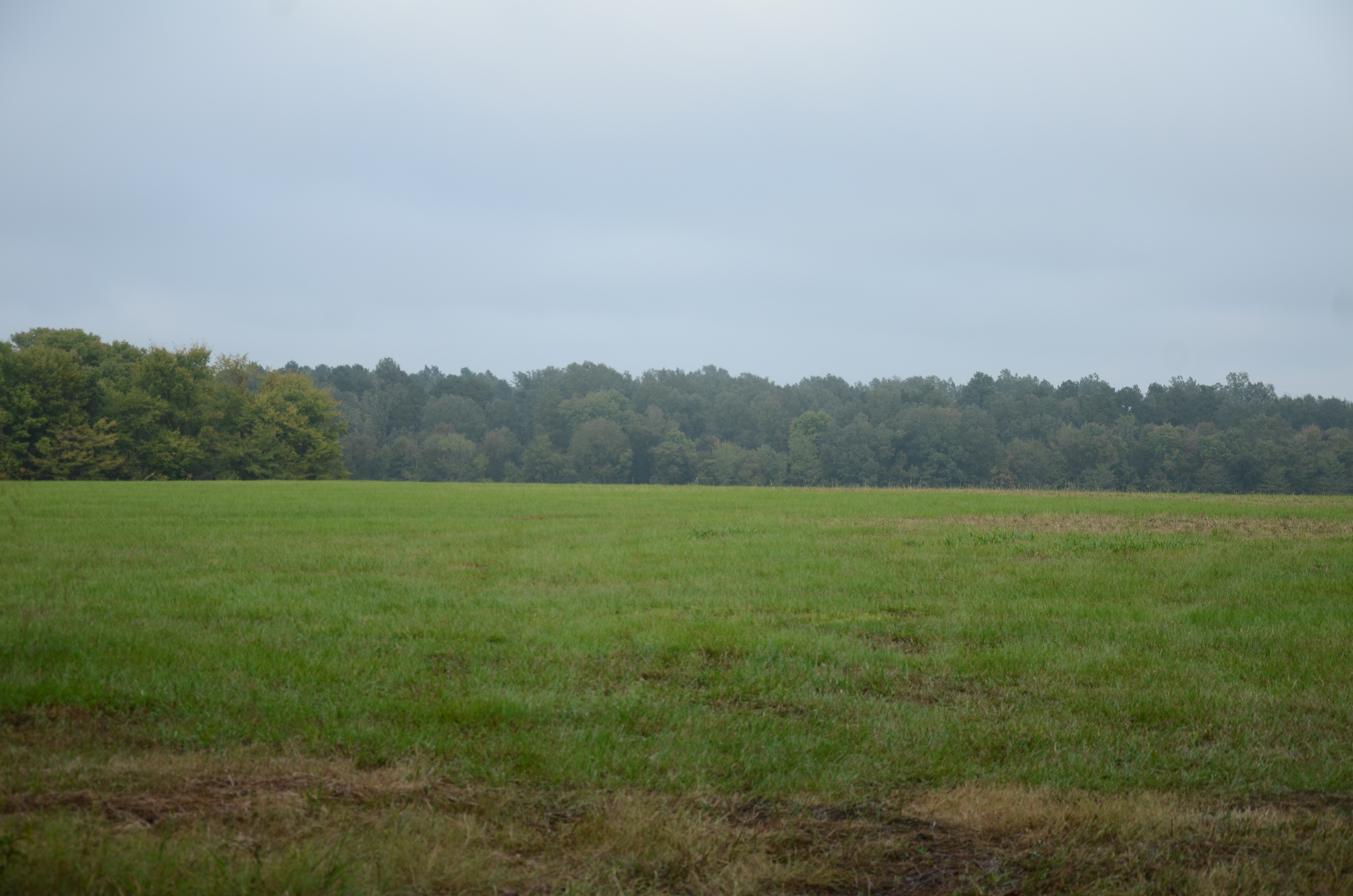
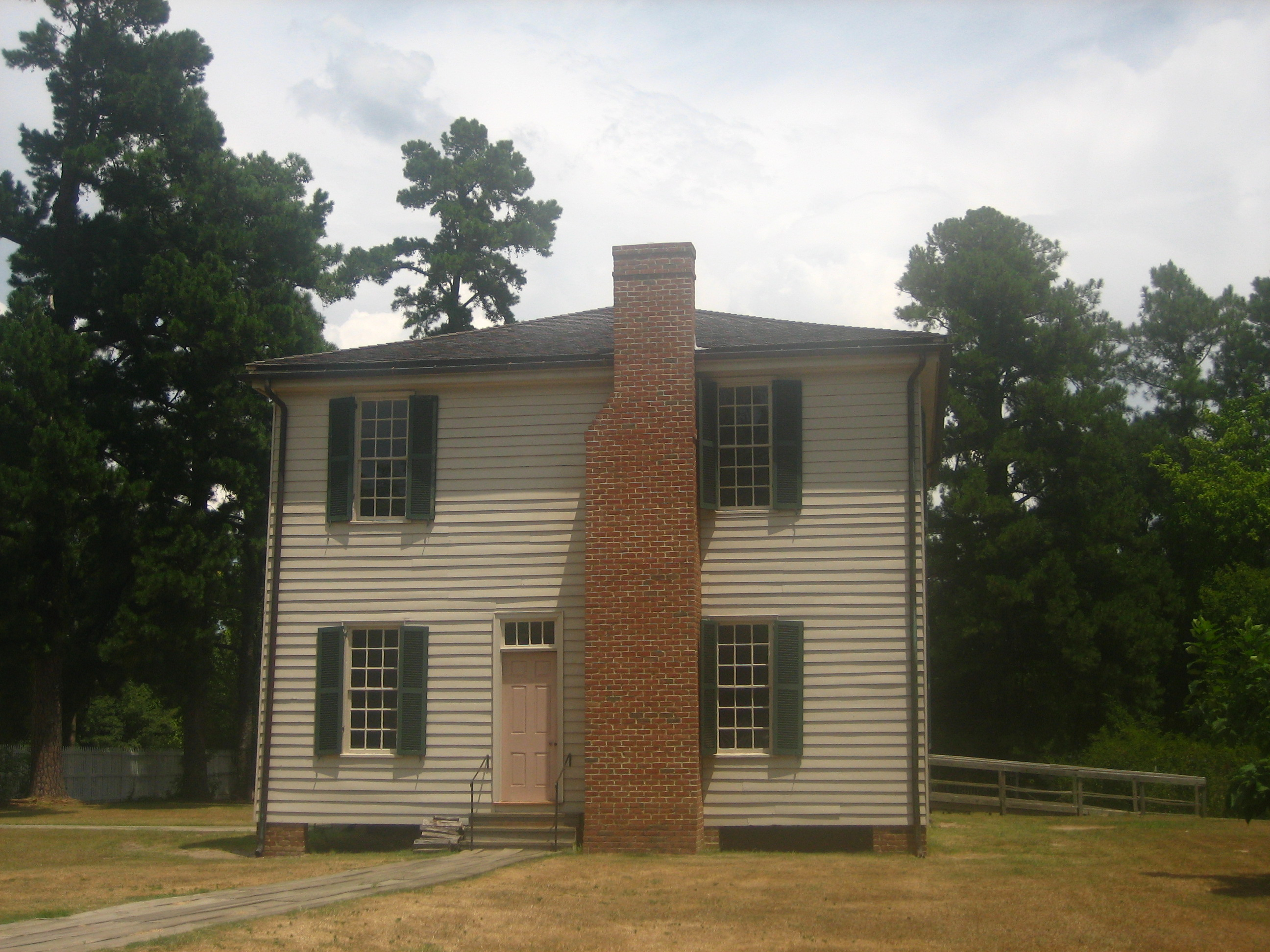
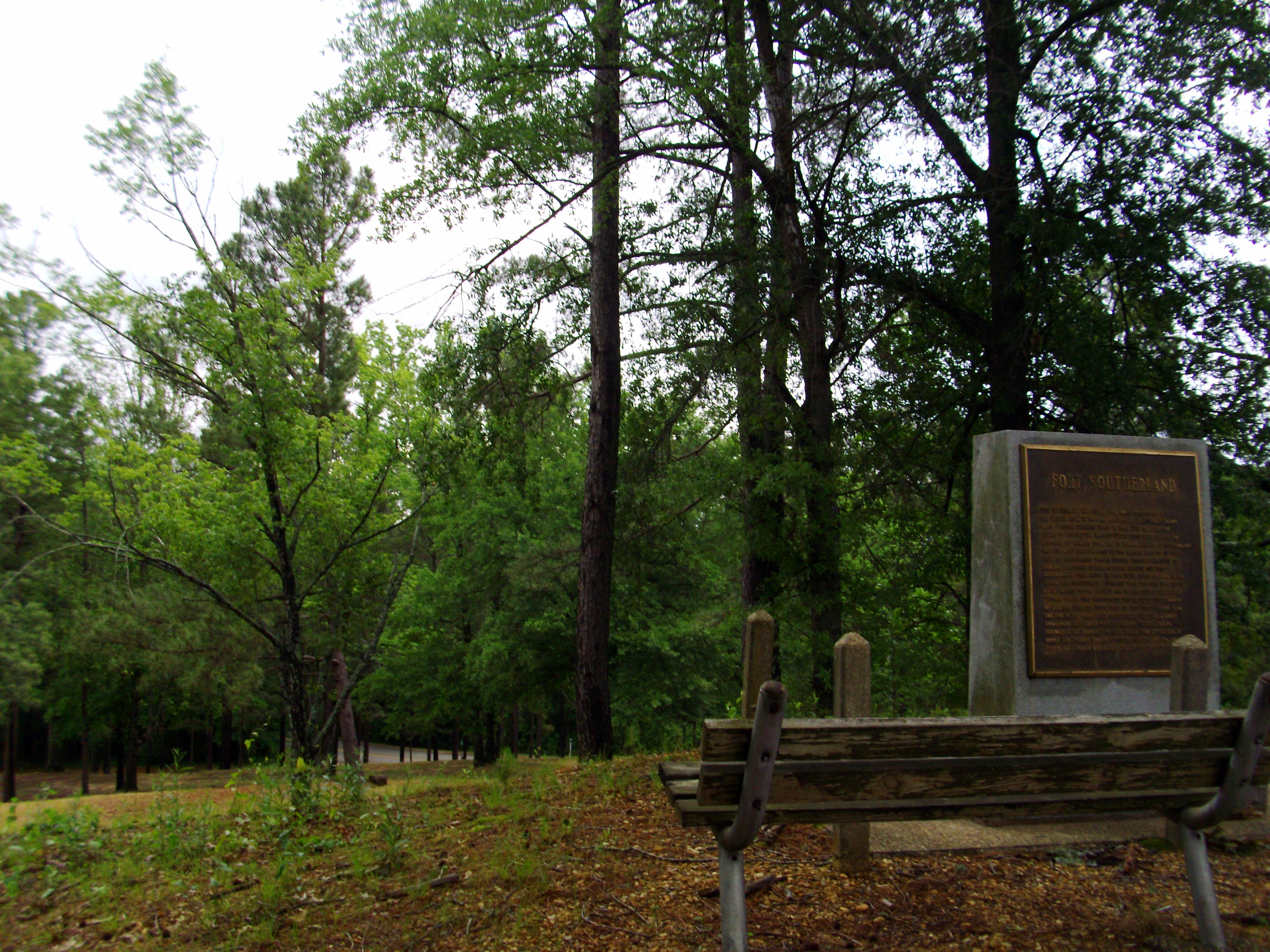
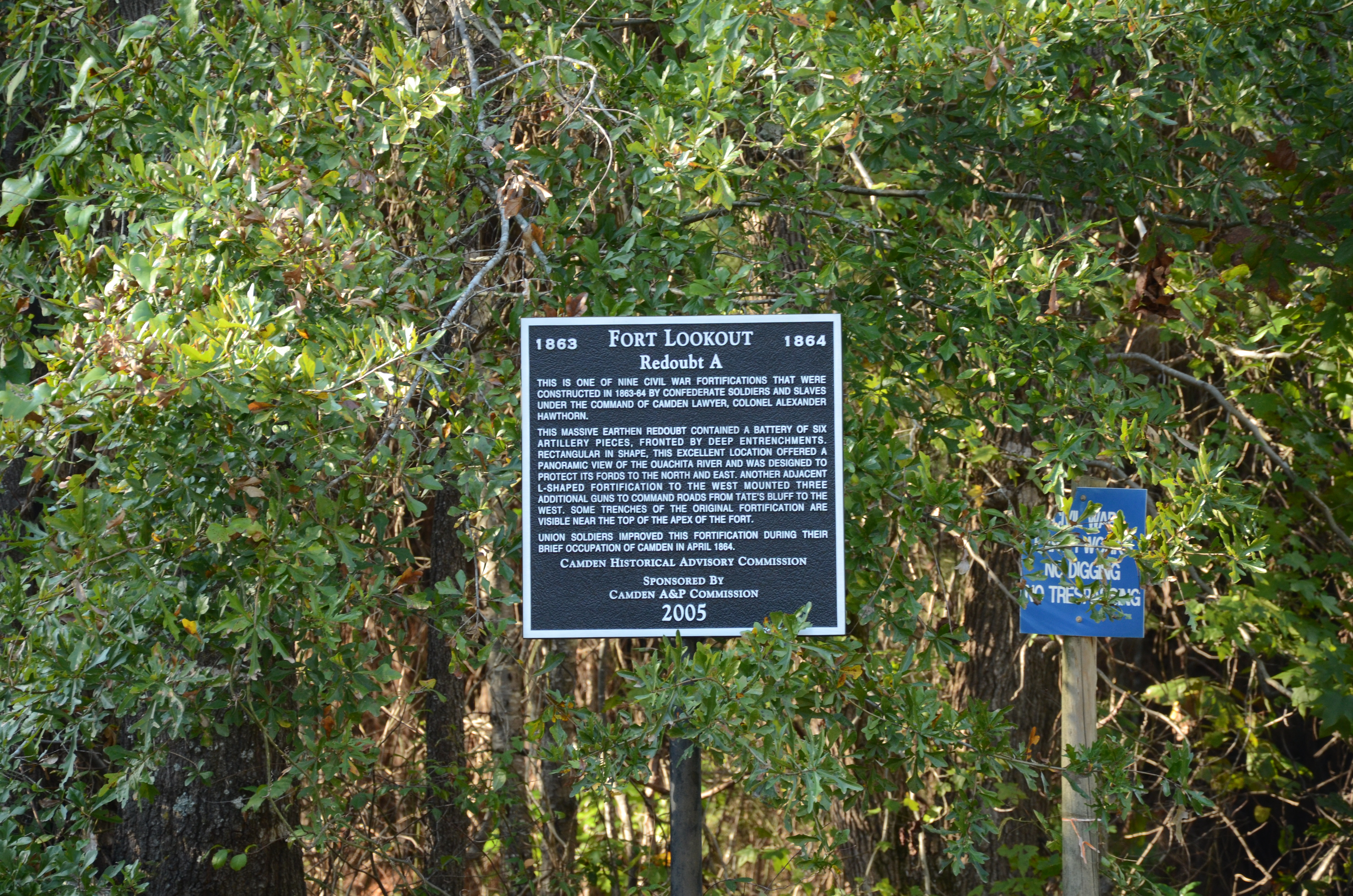
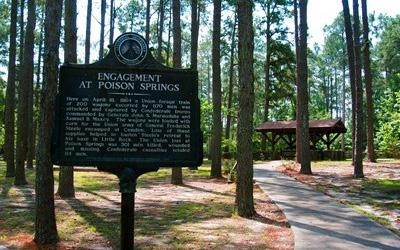
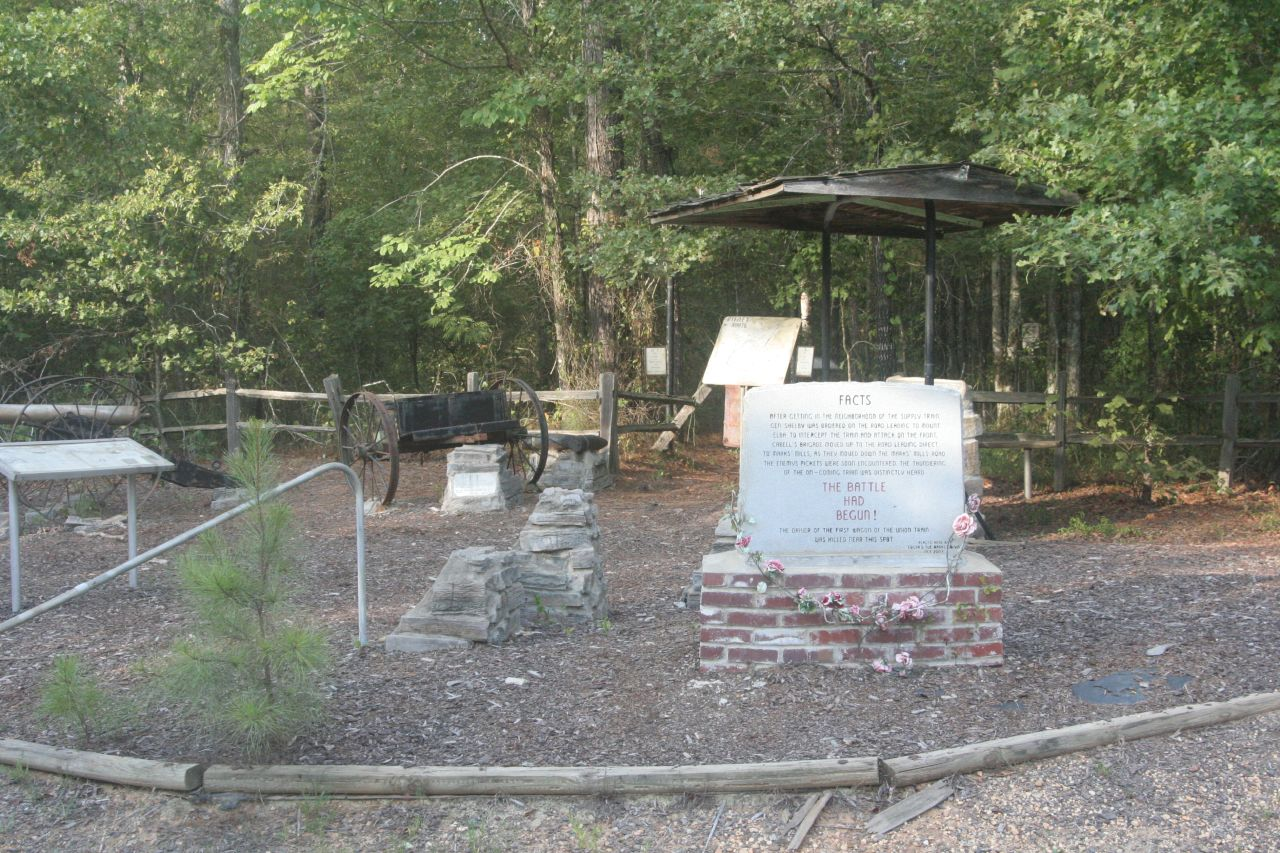
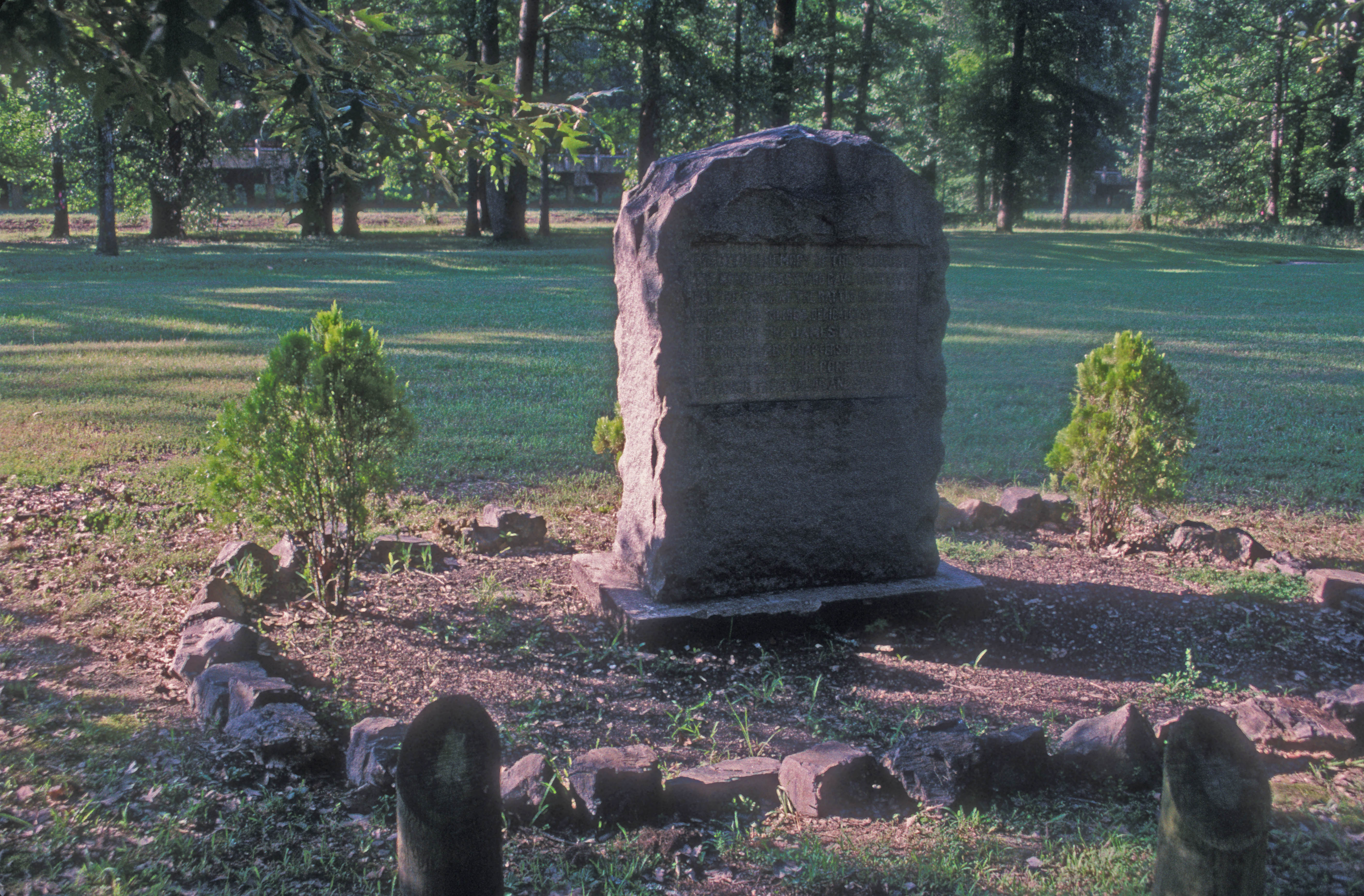
- Clockwise from top: Old U.S. Arsenal, Elkin's Ferry, Prairie De Ane Battlefield, Confederate State Capitol, Fort Southerland, Fort Lookout, Poison Springs Battlefield, Marks' Mills Battlefield, Jenkins' Ferry Battlefield

- Location within Arkansas
- Location: Clark, Cleveland, Grant, Hempstead, Nevada, Ouachita, and Pulaski counties, Arkansas
- Nearest city: Camden, Arkansas
- Coordinates: 33°35′06″N 92°50′04″W
- NRHP reference No.: 94001182
- Added to NRHP: April 19, 1994

The Camden Expedition Sites is a National Historic Landmark (NHL) site consisting of nine nationally significant historic places in southwest Arkansas where events of the Union army's disastrous Camden Expedition of 1864 occurred during the American Civil War. The Union was attempting to take over Shreveport, Louisiana. Each of the sites are individually listed on the National Register of Historic Places. It was designated a NHL site on April 19, 1994.

The National Park Service (NPS) nomination refers to nine sites, yet only eight of them are listed by name. The nomination fully describes the eight sites. The Arkansas Historic Preservation Program website includes the Old U.S. Arsenal in Little Rock, where the expedition started, in the designation. The photos accompanying the NPS nomination include images of the arsenal as well as the other eight sites.

== Description and history ==
The Camden Expedition of 1864 was part of a two-pronged strategy by the Union to drive Confederate resistance from southwestern Arkansas and northern Louisiana, and to penetrate into Confederate Texas. Major-General Frederick Steele led a Union force from Little Rock on March 23, 1864, with the objective of joining forces with Union Major-General Nathaniel P. Banks at Shreveport, Louisiana.

Confederate forces in Arkansas were directed from Washington, Arkansas, where the state Confederate government had relocated after the fall of Little Rock to the Union. Confederate Major-General Sterling Price ordered Brigadier General John S. Marmaduke to harry the Union column and to prevent it from crossing the Little Missouri River as it moved toward Washington. Advance Union forces established a beachhead on the south side of the Little Missouri on April 3, and clashed with Confederate defenders in the Battle of Elkin's Ferry. The outnumbered Confederates were forced to withdraw. General Price established a defensive position, lightly fortified by earthworks, on the road between Elkin's Ferry and Washington at the western edge of the sparsely populated Prairie d'Âne, a roughly circular area of prairie surrounded by woodlands.

After waiting for the arrival of reinforcements, General Steele advanced on April 9, but was stopped in the Battle of Prairie D'Ane, a series of encounters that ended on April 12. Steele withdrew to Camden in order to resupply his army, which was then on half-rations. Price had stripped Camden of personnel in order to defend Washington, and the Union forces occupied the city facing no significant opposition. Operations to resupply the Union army at Camden were frustrated by the Battle of Poison Spring (April 18) and the Battle of Marks' Mills (April 25). The latter battle was particularly devastating, as the Confederates captured most of the supply column, numbering some 1,400 troops and more than 200 supply wagons. Steele abandoned Camden and retreated toward Little Rock. The pursuing Confederate forces caught up with him at Jenkins' Ferry, where they fought a largely indecisive but bloody battle on April 30.

== Camden Expedition sites ==
The Camden Expedition sites are in seven Arkansas counties:

- Old U.S. Arsenal, Little Rock, Pulaski County
- Elkin's Ferry, vicinity of Prescott, Nevada & Clark counties
- Prairie D'Ane Battlefield, vicinity of Prescott, Nevada County
- Confederate State Capitol, Washington, Hempstead County
- Fort Southerland, Camden, Ouachita County
- Fort Lookout, Camden, Ouachita County
- Poison Springs Battlefield, vicinity of Chidester, Ouachita County
- Marks' Mills Battlefield, vicinity of New Edinburg, Cleveland County
- Jenkins' Ferry Battlefield, vicinity of Leola, Grant County

== See also ==
- List of National Historic Landmarks in Arkansas
