= Moscow Methodist Church and Cemetery =

Historic church in Arkansas, United States

- U.S. National Register of Historic Places
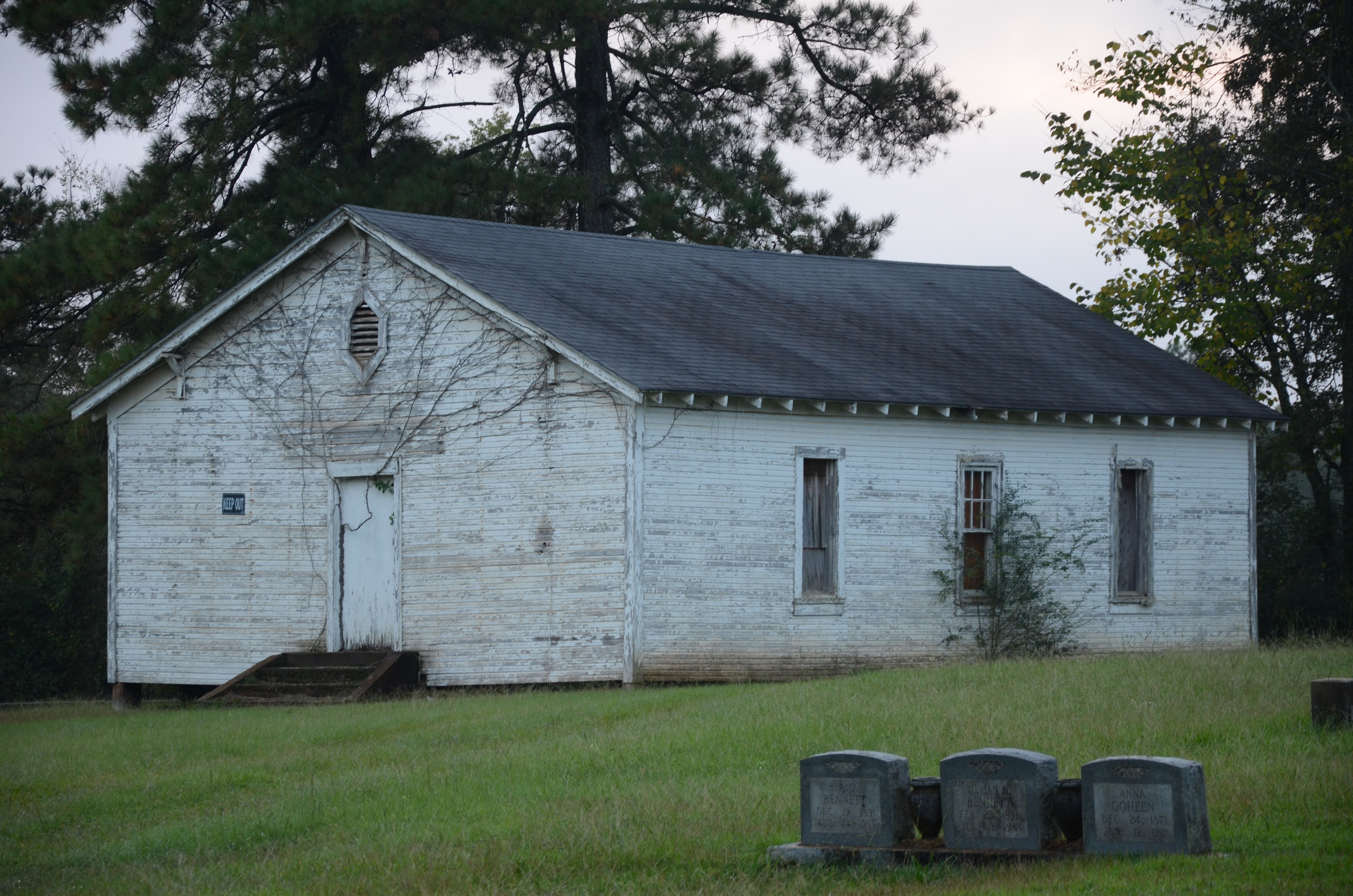

- Location within Arkansas Location within the United States
- Nearest city: Prescott, Arkansas
- Coordinates: 33°46′35.4″N 93°21′59.6″W
- Area: 3 acres (1.2 ha)
- Built: 1864
- Architectural style: Bungalow/craftsman
- NRHP reference No.: 06000826
- Added to NRHP: September 20, 2006

Moscow Methodist Church and Cemetery is a historic landmark built in 1864 and added to the National Register in 2006. The former community of Moscow is located just outside the current city limits of Prescott, Arkansas. The area is on or near the old "Moscow-Camden Road", or "Wire Road" which ran between Moscow and Camden, Arkansas. As of 2016, the location was known as the junction of Nevada County Roads 23 and 260.

== History ==
As early as 1810, the community of Moscow had primarily consisted of various small farms and businesses that included several retail shops, two blacksmiths, a post office, a saloon, and a Masonic Lodge. Methodist historians place the church congregations date of origin as early as 1842. The first marked burial in the cemetery dates to 1864, but the deed to the grounds was not issued until 1868, so it appears that the land had been in use for burial and religious purposes well before the property transaction was formalized and recorded.

In 1864, the Civil War brought several battles to the area surrounding Moscow during the Red River Campaign and the Camden Expedition.

During those conflicts, the Confederate Army of Major General Sterling Price and Brigadier General Thomas Dockery engaged the Union Army of Major General Frederick Steele and Brigadier General John Thayer. The Moscow area was surrounded by historic battles that include:

- Engagement at Elkin's Ferry. April 3–4, 1864.
- Skirmish at Prairie D’Ane. April 9–13, 1864.
- Action at Moscow. April 13, 1864.
- Engagement at Poison Spring. April 18, 1864.

In 1873, the Cairo and Fulton Railroad was constructed a short distance from Moscow and a new town was laid out alongside the rails. Being on the outskirts of a rapidly growing railroad town, Moscow merchants and businessmen quickly relocated to be alongside the rails. While Prescott grew, Moscow's population began to dwindle. The Citizens of Prescott continued to use Moscow Cemetery as a community burial site until 1880, when the De Ann Cemetery was established and Moscow community disappeared over time.

In the years afterwards, Moscow Methodist Church and Cemetery continued serving the Moscow and Prescott area. The church was listed in the minutes of the Little Rock Conference of the Methodist Church into the 1970s and regular services continued until 1989.

In December 2003, the Trustees of the Arkansas Conference of the United Methodist Church quit-claimed their interest in the church building and grounds to the Moscow Cemetery Association.

Moscow Methodist Church and Cemetery are what remains of the original community; an early settlement and little documented trade center in the Missouri Township, of Nevada County in Southwest Arkansas.

== Notable interment ==
- Edward A. Warren (1818–1875) – US Representative, Circuit Court Judge.

== See also ==
- Battle of Prairie D'Ane
