= Historic Washington State Park =

101-acre Arkansas state park in Hempstead County, Arkansas

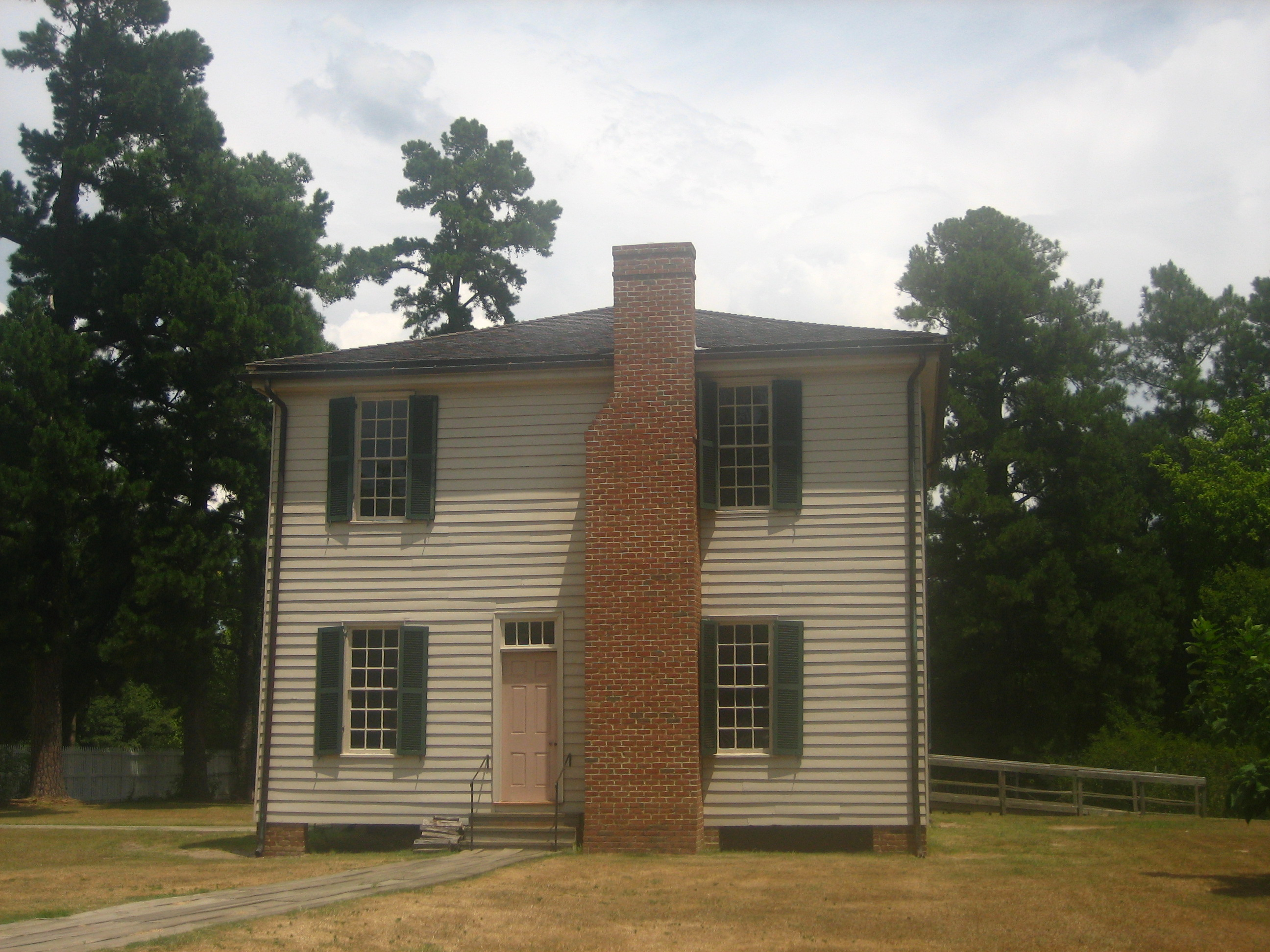
- The Old State House, Washington, Arkansas

- Location within Arkansas Location within the United States
- Interactive map of Historic Washington State Park
- Location: Washington, Arkansas, United States
- Coordinates: 33°46′26″N 93°41′03″W
- Area: 101 acres (41 ha)
- Established: 1973
- Administrator: Arkansas Department of Parks and Tourism
- Website: Official website
Arkansas State Parks
- Washington Historic District
- U.S. National Register of Historic Places
- U.S. Historic district
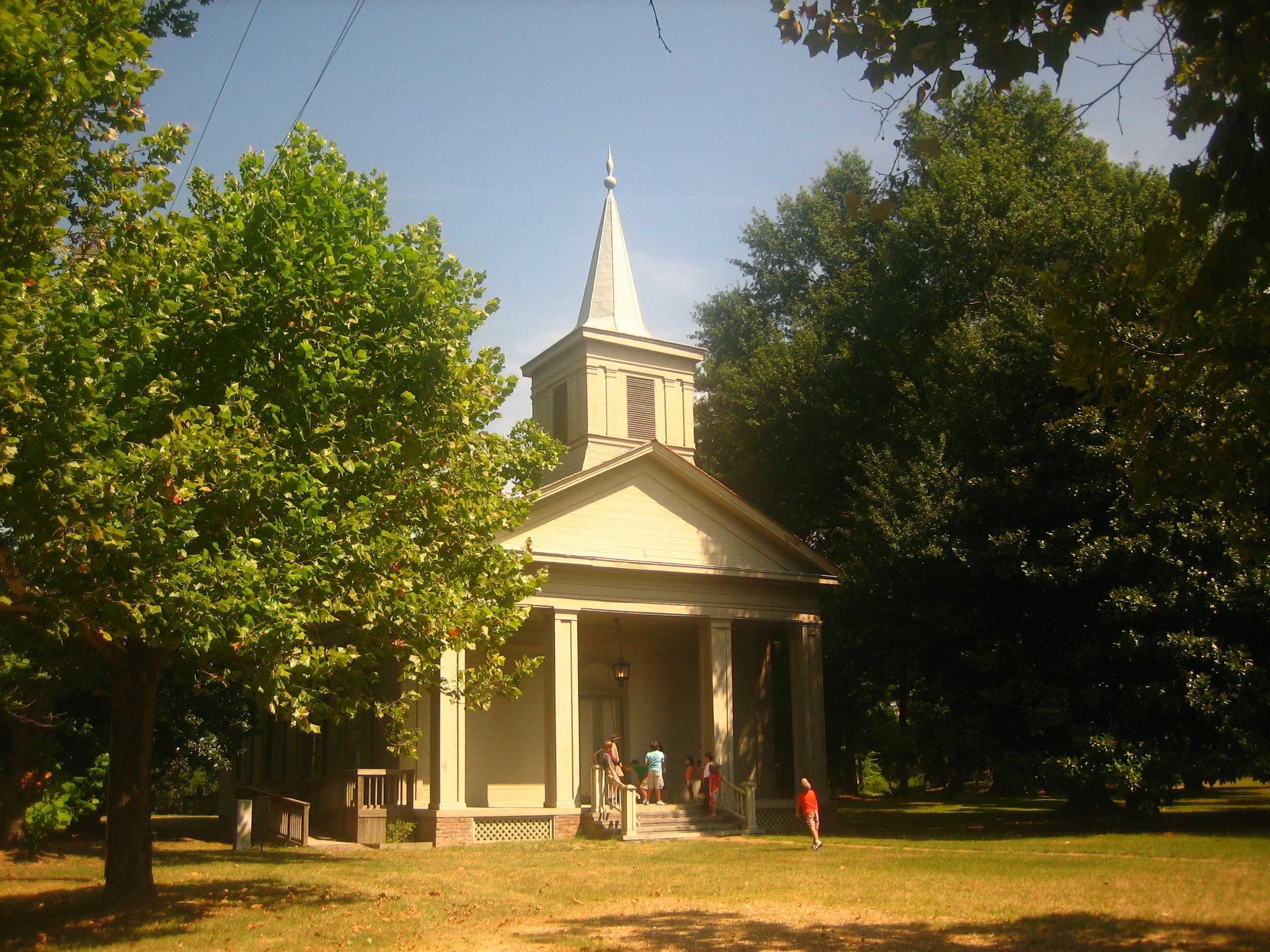
- Oldest Methodist Church in Arkansas
- Location: Boundaries correspond to original 1824 plat of city, Washington, Arkansas
- Area: 640 acres (260 ha)
- Architectural style: Greek Revival, Other, Victorian Renaissance
- NRHP reference No.: 72000204
- Added to NRHP: June 20, 1972

Historic Washington State Park (formerly Old Washington Historic State Park) is a 101-acre (41 ha) Arkansas state park in Hempstead County, Arkansas in the United States. The museum village contains a collection of pioneer artifacts from the town of Washington, Arkansas, which is a former pioneer settlement along the Southwest Trail. Walking interpretive tours are available throughout the 54 buildings. Washington served as a major trading point along the Southwest Trail, evolving into the Hempstead county seat and later the capital of Arkansas from 1863 to 1865 when Little Rock was threatened during the Civil War. The original plat of Washington was added to the National Register of Historic Places in 1972 as the Washington Historic District.

During the 1820s and 1830s, Washington was a stopover for travelers going to Texas. It was originally the county seat of Hempstead County until a new courthouse was completed in Hope, which was designated the seat of government in 1939. The park emphasizes regional 19th century history from 1824 to 1889. It is located in southwestern Arkansas east of Texarkana and near the entrance to Interstate 30.

== History of Old Washington ==
The Southwest Trail ran from St. Louis, Missouri, to the Red River port of Fulton in Hempstead County some twelve miles from Washington. At the time, the Red River was the border between the United States and Mexico. The trail was a route taken by people headed to Mexican Texas. William B. Travis, Sam Houston, and Davy Crockett each separately traveled through Washington on their way to Texas.

On February 14, 1820, Washington was authorized for a post office. That facility remains the oldest continuous postal operation west of the Mississippi River. A new postal building was dedicated on May 29, 1988, by then U.S. Senator David Hampton Pryor. Washington became a town on George Washington's birthday, February 22, 1824.

From 1863-1865, Old Washington was the site of the Confederate capitol of Arkansas after the fall of Little Rock to Union forces. The original Arkansas Confederate capital, where the refugee government fled, still exists in the park. It is a part of the Camden Expedition Sites, named in part for the town of Camden, Arkansas, in southern Arkansas.

In 1958, the Pioneer Washington Restoration Foundation began preserving the unique buildings and sites that currently lie within the park. The park was established in 1965 and opened eight years later. The Southwest Regional Archives was established there in 1978. Since that time, more than 200,000 artifacts related to 19th century life have been recovered in the park and is the site of ongoing archaeological research on small-town life.

The historic buildings provide excellent examples of the architectural styles popular in the 19th century American South. Examples on display are Southern Greek Revival, Federal architecture, Gothic Revival, Italianate, and the rough-hewn timber or brace-frame construction of the frontier.

Visitors follow plank board sidewalks along streets that have never been paved. A Moon tree was planted in the town on March 15, 1976. The largest magnolia tree in Arkansas, planted in 1839, also graces the town. Everything within the original 1824 boundaries of the town are listed on the National Register of Historic Places.

== Collections ==
Historic Washington houses the Southwest Arkansas Regional Archives which is the primary center for historical and genealogical research in the region. The archives contain rare books, court documents, newspapers, census information, photographs, scrapbooks, sheet music, and assorted family histories.

== See also ==
National Register of Historic Places listings in Hempstead County, Arkansas
