= List of National Historic Landmarks in Arkansas =

Arkansas National Historic Landmarks (clickable map)

The National Historic Landmarks in Arkansas represent Arkansas's history from the Louisiana Purchase through the Civil War and the Civil Rights Movement. It contains the landmarks designated by the U.S. Federal Government for the U.S. state of Arkansas. There are 17 National Historic Landmarks (NHLs) in Arkansas.

This page includes a list of National Park Service-administered historic areas in Arkansas.

== Key ==
	National Historic Landmark
^{†}	National Historic Landmark District
^{#}	National Historic Site, National Historical Park, National Memorial, or National Monument
^{*}	Delisted Landmark

== National Historic Landmarks ==
This is a complete list of the 17 National Historic Landmarks in Arkansas.

	Landmark name	Image	Date designated	Location	County	Description
1^{#}	Arkansas Post	Arkansas Post	October 9, 1960 (#66000198)	Gillett; 34°01′09″N 91°20′54″W	Arkansas	Commemorates the first semi-permanent European settlement in the Lower Mississippi Valley (1686); an American Revolutionary War skirmish (1783); the first territorial capital of Arkansas (1819–1821); and the American Civil War Battle of Fort Hindman (1863)
2	Daisy Bates House	Daisy Bates House	January 3, 2001 (#01000072)	Little Rock; 34°43′18″N 92°17′00″W	Pulaski	Supporting site for desegregation of Little Rock Central High School
3^{†}	Bathhouse Row	Bathhouse Row	May 28, 1987 (#74000275)	Hot Springs; 34°30′44″N 93°03′13″W	Garland	In Hot Springs National Park; largest collection of bathhouses in the United States; remains of the only federally-run spa
4	Beginning Point of the Louisiana Purchase Land Survey	Beginning Point of the Louisiana Purchase Land Survey	April 19, 1993 (#72000206)	Blackton; 34°38′42″N 91°03′05″W	Lee, Phillips, and Monroe	Point from which the lands acquired through the Louisiana Purchase of 1803 were subsequently surveyed
5^{†}	Camden Expedition Sites	Camden Expedition Sites	April 19, 1994 (#94001182)	Camden and widely scattered sites across seven counties 33°35′04″N 92°50′04″W	Clark, Cleveland, Grant, Hempstead, Nevada, Ouachita, and Pulaski	Old U.S. Arsenal, Elkin's Ferry, Prairie De Ane Battlefield, Confederate State Capitol, Poison Springs Battlefield, Fort Lookout, Marks' Mills Battlefield, and Jenkins' Ferry Battlefield
6	Centennial Baptist Church	Centennial Baptist Church	July 31, 2003 (#87000518)	Helena-West Helena; 34°31′32″N 90°35′27″W	Phillips	Where Elias Camp Morris preached, unofficial headquarters for National Baptist Convention
7	City of Oakland (USS Hoga) (Tug)	City of Oakland (USS Hoga) (Tug)	June 30, 1989 (#89001429)	North Little Rock; 34°45′09″N 92°16′04″W	Pulaski	Tugboat; at Pearl Harbor fought ship fires and helped push sinking USS Nevada out of the ship channel; served Oakland harbor for many years; The vessel was transferred to the Arkansas Inland Maritime Museum (AIMM) in 2005 and was scheduled to be moved to North Little Rock, Arkansas in 2007. The move has been delayed by damage from Hurricane Katrina along the proposed tow route to AIMM and transport costs. She was moved to the Arkansas Inland Maritime Museum in November 2015.
8	Eaker Site	Eaker Site	June 19, 1996 (#91001048)	Blytheville; 35°57′48″N 89°56′04″W	Mississippi	Archaeological site; shows evidence of pre-historic Nodena populations and also Quapaw occupation
9^{#}	Fort Smith	Fort Smith	December 19, 1960 (#66000202)	Fort Smith; 35°20′36″N 94°25′22″W	Sebastian	This site includes the remains of two 19th-century U.S. military forts and the Federal Court for the Western District of Arkansas.
10	Little Rock Central High School	Little Rock Central High School	May 20, 1982 (#01000274)	Little Rock; 34°44′16″N 92°17′52″W	Pulaski	Focal point of the Little Rock Integration Crisis of 1957
11	Menard-Hodges Site	Menard-Hodges Site	April 11, 1989 (#85003542)	Nady; 34°00′14″N 91°15′15″W	Arkansas	Site includes two large mounds and several house mounds, as well as remains of a 17th-century French trading post; now owned by the National Park Service and administered as part of the Arkansas Post National Memorial.
12	Nodena Site	Nodena Site	February 19, 1964 (#66000201)	Wilson; 35°33′15″N 89°57′06″W	Mississippi	Located on Nodena Plantation; type site for an important Late Mississippian cultural component, the Nodena phase; date from about 1400-1700 AD; first excavations in 1897.
13	Old State House	Old State House	December 9, 1997 (#69000037)	Little Rock; 34°44′55″N 92°16′24″W	Pulaski	Oldest surviving state capitol building west of the Mississippi River.
14	Parkin Indian Mound	Parkin Indian Mound	July 19, 1964 (#66000200)	Parkin; 35°16′38″N 90°33′16″W	Cross	A Late Mississippian and protohistoric palisaded village with one mound; may be the town of Casqui mentioned by 16th century Spanish explorer Hernando de Soto.
15	Joseph Taylor Robinson House	Joseph Taylor Robinson House	October 12, 1992 (#75000411)	Little Rock; 34°43′40″N 92°16′44″W	Pulaski	Home of influential Arkansas governor and U.S. senator
16^{†}	Rohwer Relocation Center Memorial Cemetery	Rohwer Relocation Center Memorial Cemetery	July 6, 1992 (#92001882)	Rohwer; 33°45′52″N 91°16′49″W	Desha	Site of a World War II Japanese American internment camp
17	Toltec Mounds Site	Toltec Mounds Site	June 2, 1978 (#73000382)	Scott; 34°38′49″N 92°03′55″W	Lonoke	One of the most significant remnants of Native American life in the state.

== Historic areas administered by the National Park Service ==
National Historic Sites, National Historical Parks, National Monuments, and certain other areas listed in the National Park system are historic landmarks of national importance that are highly protected already, often before the inauguration of the NHL program in 1960, and are then often not also named NHLs per se. There are four of these in Arkansas. The National Park Service lists these four together with the NHLs in the state, The Arkansas Post National Memorial, the Fort Smith National Historic Site (shared with Oklahoma) and the Little Rock Central High School National Historic Site are also NHLs and are listed above. The remaining one is:

	Landmark name	Image	Date established	Location	County	Description
1	Pea Ridge National Military Park		20 July 1956	Pea Ridge	Benton	Site of Battle of Pea Ridge, March 7 and 8, 1862, a Union victory in the American Civil War

Other National Park Service-administered areas in Arkansas are the Buffalo National River and the Hot Springs National Park (not historic per se but which includes Bathhouse Row, an NHL listed above).

== See also ==
- National Register of Historic Places listings in Arkansas
- List of National Historic Landmarks by state
- List of National Natural Landmarks in Arkansas
