= Confederate State Capitol building (Arkansas) =

Historic property and museum in Arkansas, United States

- Confederate State Capitol
- U.S. National Register of Historic Places
- U.S. National Historic Landmark District – Contributing property
- U.S. Historic district – Contributing property
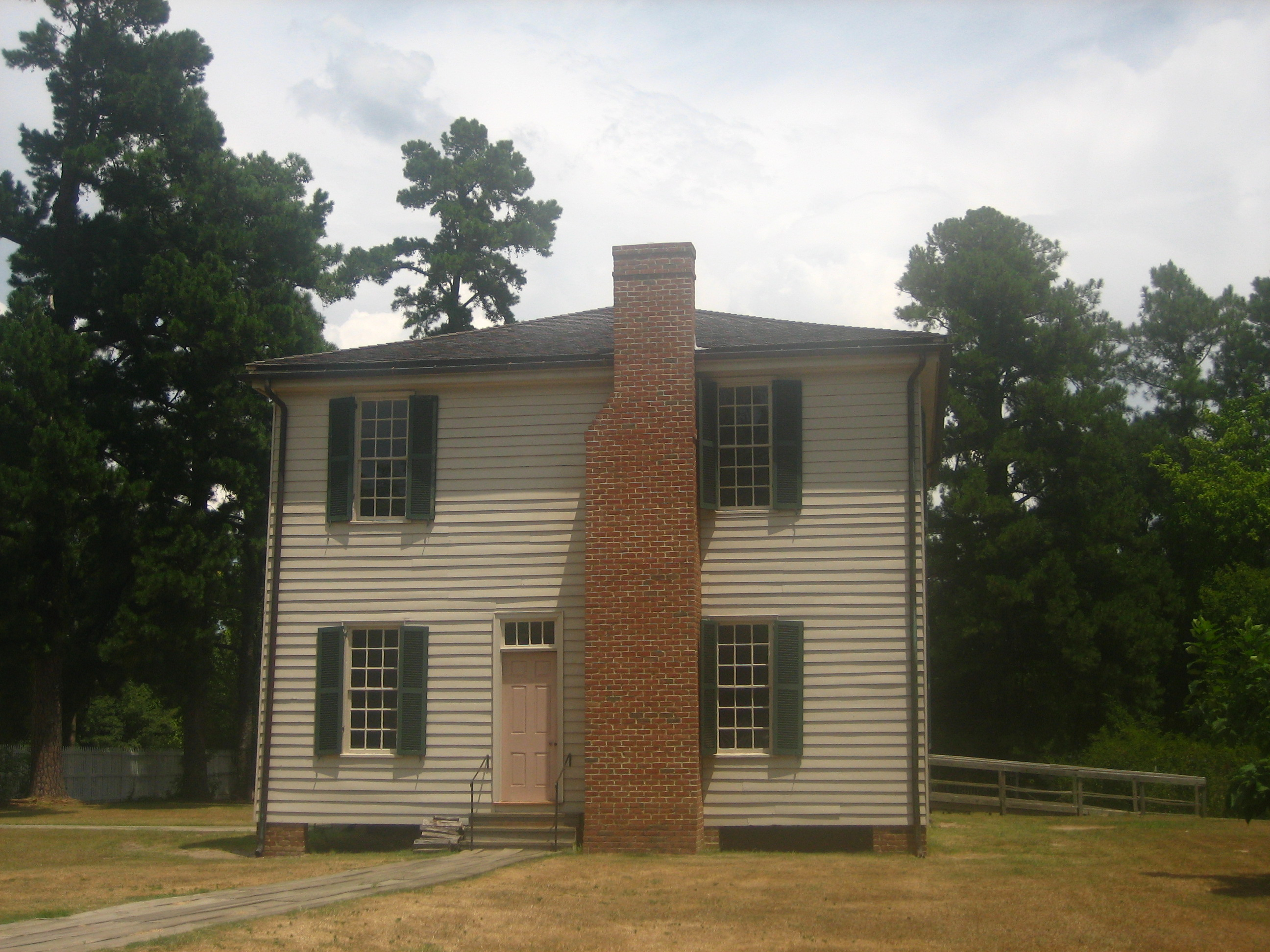
- Main façade of the State House

- Location within Arkansas
- Location: Washington, Arkansas
- Coordinates: 33°46′43″N 93°40′41″W
- Built: 1836
- Architect: Tillman L. Patterson
- Architectural style: Greek Revival
- Part of: Camden Expedition Sites (ID94001182); Washington Historic District (ID72000204)
- NRHP reference No.: 72000203

Significant dates
- Added to NRHP: May 19, 1972
- Designated NHLDCP: April 19, 1994
- Designated CP: June 20, 1972

The Confederate State Capitol building in Washington, Arkansas was the capital of the Confederate state government of Arkansas, during 1863–1865, after Little Rock, Arkansas fell to Union forces in the American Civil War. It is located within Historic Washington State Park, and is a National Historic Landmark.

== Description and history ==
The capitol building is a two-story wood-frame structure, about 44 feet (13 m) wide and 34 feet (10 m) deep, resting on a brick foundation. It is topped by a hip roof covered in cedar shakes. Each of the two floors is dominated by a large chamber; that on the ground floor originally served as a courtroom, while that on the upper floor was used by local Masonic societies. The original front entrance is sheltered by a single-story portico with a triangular pediment with Greek Revival styling. There are chimneys on the two sides of the building.

The building was erected in 1836, and was Hempstead County's second courthouse, replacing an 1824 log structure. The building served as the county court until 1874, when a new brick building was constructed. After the fall of Little Rock to Union Army forces in September 1863, during the American Civil War, Governor Harris Flanagin ordered the seat of government relocated to Washington. The Confederate state government would remain in this building until the end of the war in 1865.

After the court functions moved out in 1874, the building was repurposed for use as a school, a role it fulfilled until 1914. It thereafter served as a private residence until 1928, when it was acquired by the state through the efforts of the local United Daughters of the Confederacy chapter. It is now part of Historic Washington State Park.

The building was listed on the National Register of Historic Places in 1970, and, with other sites, was designated part of the Camden Expedition Sites National Historic Landmark District in 1994.

== See also ==
- List of National Historic Landmarks in Arkansas
- National Register of Historic Places listings in Hempstead County, Arkansas
