= Elkin's Ferry Battlefield =

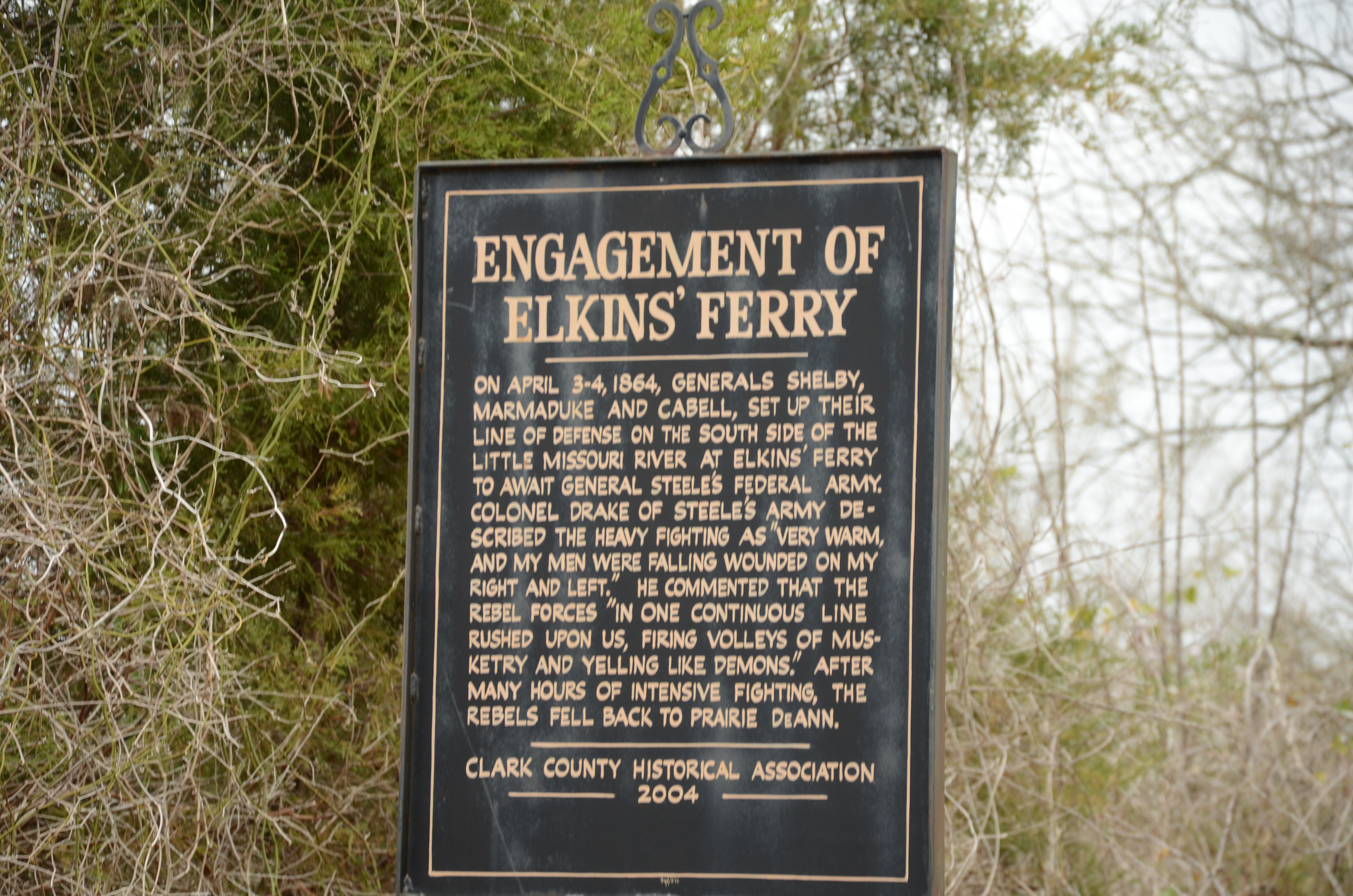
- Clark County Historical Association Marker

- Location in Arkansas
- 33°55′50″N 93°21′26″W
- Location: Clark and Nevada counties, Arkansas
- Nearest city: Prescott, Arkansas

History
- Established: April 19, 1994
- Original use: Field, forest, battlefield

Site notes
- Area: 575 acres (233 ha)
- Governing body: Private

U.S. National Historic Landmark District – Contributing property
- Official name: Elkin's Ferry
- Designated: April 19, 1994
- Part of: Camden Expedition Sites National Historic Landmark
- Reference no.: 94001182

Elkin's Ferry Battlefield was the site of the Battle of Elkin's Ferry, an engagement of the Camden Expedition during the American Civil War. The battlefield is located about 10 miles (16 km) north of Prescott, Arkansas, spanning the Little Missouri River in Clark and Nevada counties. The 575-acre (233 ha) battlefield area was designated a part of the Camden Expedition Sites National Historic Landmark, made up of several of the Union expedition's key sites, on April 19, 1994.

== Description ==
The Elkin's Ferry Battlefield is a predominantly wooded area, crossed by the Little Missouri River, and Middle and Howard Creeks, which are tributaries to its south that flow roughly from west to east. The present alignment of Nevada County Route 37 and Clark County Route 14 roughly follows the route of the Union forces. The presumed ferry site is still visible as a deep cut in the river bank near the road. The ferry was replaced by a wooden bridge in the 1920s, which was washed out sometime in the 1950s or 1960s. The construction of Interstate 30 resulted in the decreased significance of the area for transportation, and contributed to the preservation of the battlefield. The area is also flood-prone (as it was in the 1860s), and not suitable for development.

== See also ==
- List of National Historic Landmarks in Arkansas
- National Register of Historic Places listings in Clark County, Arkansas
- National Register of Historic Places listings in Nevada County, Arkansas
