= Battle of Elkin's Ferry =

1864 battle of the American Civil Warr

- Part of the American Civil War
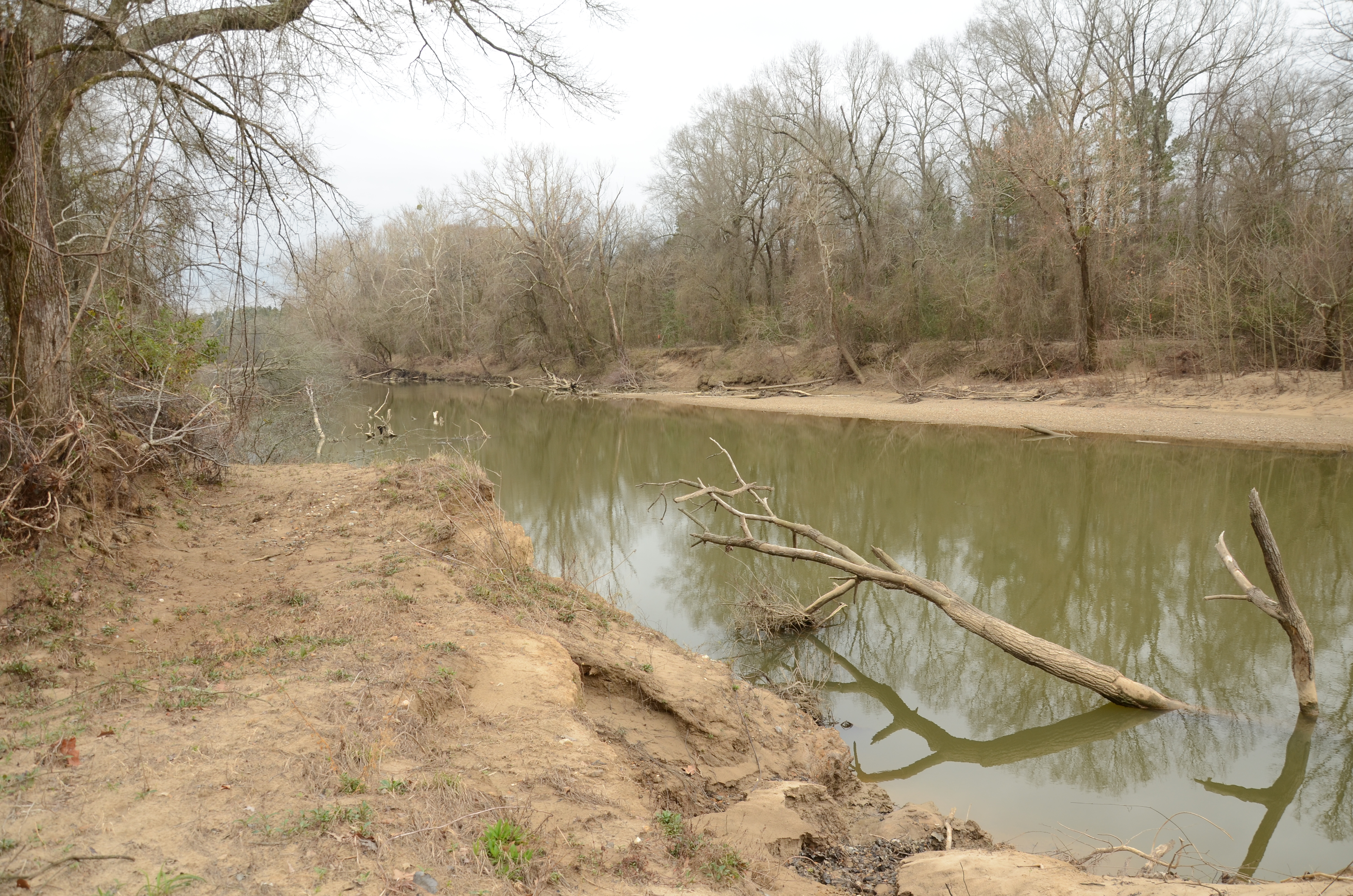
- The Little Missouri at Elkin's Ferry
Date	April 3 – 4, 1864
Location	Clark and Nevada counties, Arkansas 33°55′50″N 93°21′26″W
Result	Union victory

Belligerents
United States (Union)	Confederate States

Commanders and leaders
(United States) Frederick Steele	(Confederate States of America) John S. Marmaduke

Strength
8,500	7,500

Casualties and losses
38	54
- Location in Arkansas

The Battle of Elkin's Ferry (April 3 – 4, 1864), also known as Engagement at Elkin's Ferry, was fought in Clark and Nevada counties in Arkansas as part of the Camden Expedition, during the American Civil War.

== Prelude ==
Major-General Frederick Steele had the 3rd Division of the Seventh Army Corps and two cavalry brigades (about 8,500 men) under his command, whereas Brigadier-General John Marmaduke had three cavalry brigades (about 7,500 men) under his command. During the Camden expedition, Federal forces had to ford the Little Missouri River because all of the bridges were impassable.

== Battle ==
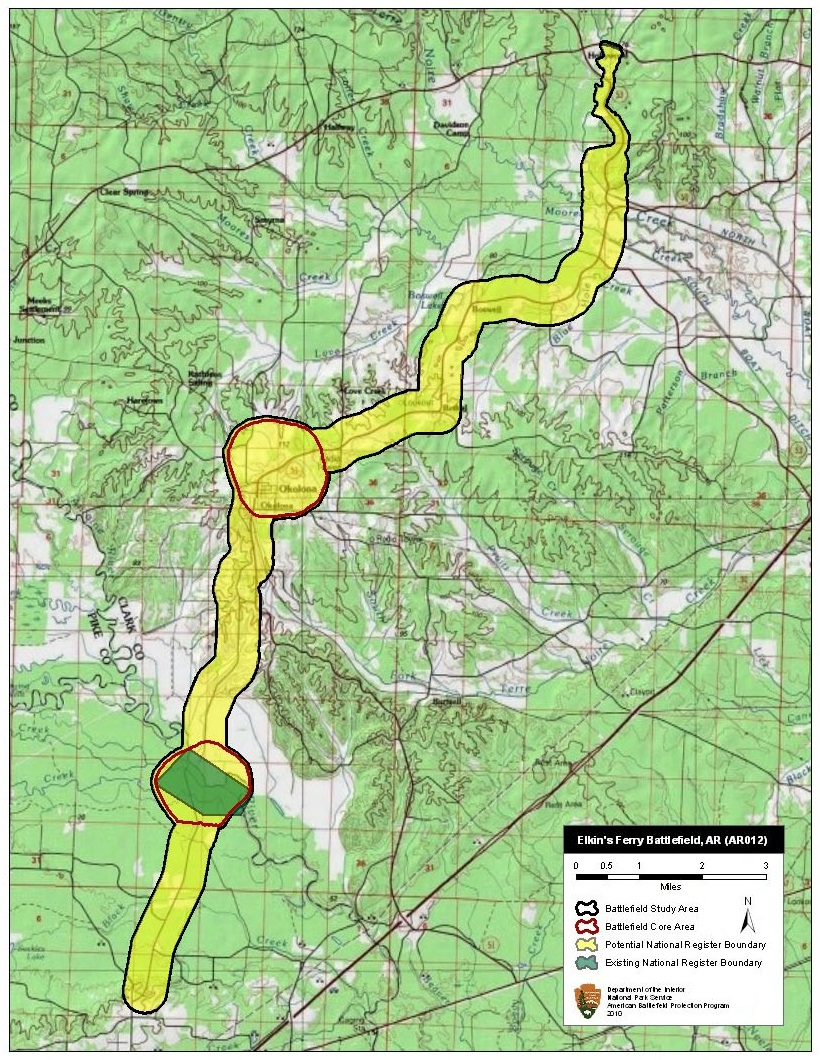
21st century map of the Pine Bluff Battlefield

With all the bridges across the river destroyed, Steele ordered Brigadier-General Frederick Salomon, commanding the Third Division, to take and hold a ford known as Elkin's Ferry on the afternoon of April 2, 1864. The 43rd Indiana was tasked with this objective, supported by elements of the 36th Iowa Infantry and the 2nd Missouri Light Artillery. Following a forced march, the 43rd arrived at the crossing after dark that evening, crossed the river, and set up defensive positions while awaiting the rest of Steele's army.

Opposing the Federal advance was a division of three cavalry brigades under Marmaduke—about 7500 troopers altogether. Marmaduke ordered Brigadier-General Joseph Shelby to attack the 43rd and take back the ford. Federal Colonel William McLean states what happened next:

The day after my arrival [3 April 1864], occasional firing along my picket lines, and skirmishing in front, convinced me that the enemy were on the alert, either for the purpose of watching the movements of the army, of which my brigade constituted the advance [guard]; or, if possible, by a direct attack upon me in overwhelming numbers, to cut me off before reinforcements could be obtained from across the river. Early on the morning of the third instant, I ordered Major Norris, of the 43rd Indiana, to proceed with four companies of that regiment to the front, to reconnoiter the position of the enemy, deploy the men as skirmishers, and support the cavalry pickets. He soon succeeded in discovering the position of the advance pickets and skirmishers of the enemy, drove them back for some distance, pressing them so closely that the retreat of a number of them being cut off, sixteen came into our line and surrendered.

On the same evening, being satisfied that the enemy were in our front in force, and designed attacking us during the night or the next morning, I ordered Lieutenant Colonel Drake, 36th Iowa, to proceed with three companies from that regiment, and three companies from the 43rd Indiana, to a position on the main road leading from the ford immediately in our front, to deploy his men on the right and left of the road, to watch the movements of the enemy, and to resist their approach as long as was prudent, and retire to the reserves when they approached in force. One section of artillery, under Lieutenant Peetz, was planted so as to fully command the road and the leading approach on our right and left.

At six o'clock on the morning of the 4th the enemy approached in force, and commenced an attack on the advance companies of Lieutenant Colonel Drake, who resisted them gallantly for nearly two hours, being well supported by the artillery of Lieutenant Peetz. Too much praise cannot be awarded Colonel Drake for the very distinguished gallantry and determined courage he exhibited during this contest.

The capture by his forces early in the morning of a Rebel lieutenant—an aid-de-camp of General Marmaduke—confirmed me in the belief that the General was near in person, with a large portion of his division. After a very lively skirmish of nearly two hours, the enemy having discovered the position of our battery, and replying to it vigorously with four pieces of artillery, our pickets and advanced skirmishers were driven back on the left upon their infantry reserves, while upon the right they maintained their position.

The enemy (since ascertained to be General Cabell's brigade, sixteen hundred strong), charged with a yell upon our left, for the purpose of flanking us and capturing our battery. Their approach from the cover of the timber was met gallantly by two or three well directed volleys from the 36th Iowa Immediately after the charge and repulse of the enemy, the reinforcements sent for by me arrived, consisting of the 29th Iowa Infantry and the 9th Wisconsin Infantry, of Brigadier General Rice's brigade. But before they were put in position by him the enemy withdrew; not, however, until a grape-shot from the batter had inflicted a slight wound upon the General's head, from the effect of which, I am gratified to say, he recovered.

== Aftermath ==
Losses on both sides in the Battle of Elkin's Ferry were light, with 18 Confederate soldiers killed and 50 wounded, and with 30 Union soldiers wounded. On the evening of April 4, Shelby's brigade joined Marmaduke, and together they withdrew 16 miles south to Prairie D'Ane the following morning.

== Battlefield preservation ==
The American Battlefield Trust and its partners have acquired and preserved 442 acres at the Elkin's Ferry Battlefield.

== See also ==
- List of American Civil War battles
- Troop engagements of the American Civil War, 1864
