= Battle of Prairie D'Ane =

1864 battle of the American Civil War

- Part of the American Civil War
Date	April 9 – 13, 1864
Location	Near Moscow Church, south of Prescott (present-day Nevada County, Arkansas) 33°46′35.401″N 93°21′59.616″W
Result	Union victory

Belligerents
United States (Union)	Confederate States

Commanders and leaders
(United States) Maj. Gen. Frederick Steele	(Confederate States of America) Maj. Gen. Sterling Price

Units involved
Department of Arkansas and Seventh Army Corps	District of Arkansas

Strength
13,000	7,000

Casualties and losses
100	50
- Location within Arkansas

The Battle of Prairie D'Ane (April 9 – 13, 1864), also known as the Skirmish at Prairie D'Ane, Battle of Gum Springs, or Battle of Moscow, was fought in present-day Nevada County, Arkansas, as part of the Camden Expedition, during the American Civil War. The Camden Expedition was launched by Union forces as part of the Red River Campaign of 1864. U.S. planners envisioned two federal armies converging simultaneously, one force under the command of Maj. Gen. Nathaniel Banks pressing northward up the Red River commencing at Alexandria, Louisiana and the other federal army under the command of Maj. Gen. Frederick Steele driving southwestward from Little Rock, Arkansas. The objective was to press the rebel army of Gen. E. Kirby Smith back upon the rebel stronghold at Shreveport and defeat him. If successful, a somewhat vague second phase envisioned the two federal armies combining into one large force and continuing their offensive with a westward push into Texas.

== Background ==
Prairie D'Âne—French for "Donkey Meadow"—was a prominent topographical feature in southwest Arkansas consisting of an open prairie 20 miles square, surrounded on all sides primarily by dense pine forest. In 1864 it was a well-known landmark some one hundred miles southwest of Little Rock. The prairie was a crossroads; to the west lay Washington, the Confederate capital of Arkansas since their abandonment of Little Rock in September 1863. To the east of the prairie lay the heavily fortified city of Camden, where many Confederate troops were headquartered. To the south of Prairie D'Ane lay the strategic Red River, with Shreveport, Louisiana beyond.

The US Army Captured Little Rock on 10 September 1863. As Union forces marched into the city, the Confederates hastily gathered up their official state documents and moved their seat of government to Washington. In their retreat to the southwest, the Confederates constructed defensive works at several points along the old military road running from Benton to Arkadelphia. As they built extensive earthen and log breastworks at the northern edge of Prairie D'Ane, it was . A Confederate defeat on the prairie would lay open the route to Washington for the federal army. But Prairie D'Ane posed a difficult defensive problem for the rebels. On the one hand, its wide open plain offered good fields of fire for defending artillery batteries; on the other hand, the same open country offered an attacking force plenty of space in which to maneuver and outflank the defenders in their fixed entrenchments. Most of the heavy rebel defensive barriers erected along the route from Little Rock to Prairie D'Ane had been built by slave labor. Roving groups of rebel guerrilla cavalry meanwhile were dispatched to harass federal forces along their line of march from Little Rock.

== Prelude ==
Defending Confederate forces engaged in the battle were under the overall command of Maj. Gen. Sterling Price and consisted primarily of Arkansas and Missouri Confederate mounted regiments, and some Arkansas State Troops comprising three cavalry divisions commanded by General James Fagan, General John Marmaduke and General Samuel Maxey. The three divisions of infantry and dismounted cavalry commanded by Generals John Walker, Thomas Churchill and Mosby Parsons, and their supporting artillery had been dispatched by Genl. Kirby Smith to Louisiana in opposing Union Maj. Gen. Banks thrust up the Red River toward Shreveport. Many of the Arkansas state troops were conscripts, some of whom had served in previous campaigns, had deserted the ranks, and were re-drafted by Confederate press gangs.

Attacking U.S. forces comprised the Seventh Army Corps (augmented) under the overall command of Maj. Gen. Frederick Steele and consisting of two infantry divisions commanded by Generals Frederick Salomon and John Thayer and a cavalry division under the command of General Eugene Carr, and supported by five artillery batteries. Most of the attacking forces were troops from Iowa, Wisconsin, Indiana, Illinois, Ohio, Arkansas and Kansas—the latter including two recently raised regiments of United States Colored Troops (authorized in 1863). Almost every regiment of the VII Corps was seriously under strength, due to sickness and disability caused by Typhoid fever, measles, malaria (known as "Southern Fever"), influenza, chronic diarrhea, viruses of unknown origin, and chronic painful rheumatism caused by the damp and humid conditions encountered by the northern soldiers serving in the Arkansas Delta country around Helena from 1862 to 1863. At one point in the US Army's Arkansas campaign, one division had some 1000 soldiers on the sick list. Death by disease was far more common for federal soldiers serving in the Arkansas theater than death by combat(and for all soldiers on both sides).

== Battle ==
Following a crossing of the Little Missouri River by elements of the 1st Iowa Cavalry, the 36th Iowa Infantry and 43rd Indiana Infantry followed on the evening of April 2. The cavalry established a picket line well forward up the road egressing from the ford some 1 1/4 miles south of the river in the densely timbered bottom land, They blocked the road at a point overlooking an old orchard. The infantry following them across were ordered into hasty bivouac with the 36th Iowa moving just upstream of the ford and the 43rd Indiana sliding just to the south of it. The hour was late and the troops were ordered to lay on their arms and to expect a dawn attack. From their camps at the river, the federal infantry could hear some exchanges of fire to their front between the 1st Iowa cavalry and rebel guards monitoring that crossing. The federals were surprised when no attack came at dawn on the 3rd, a Sunday. It was so quiet that the infantry regiments sent out foraging parties to look for whatever meat could be found. At around 1 p.m. three companies of the 43rd Indiana went forward toward the cavalry picket line, were spotted by the Confederates and some skirmishing occurred. Three companies of the 36th Iowa—A, D and G-- commanded by Lieutenant-Colonel F.M. Drake rushed up to assist the Indiana companies, only to return to their bivouac, and then be rushed forward for a second round of skirmishing late in the day. The federals held the ford and the road south for more than a mile. The small rebel detachment guarding the ford was being steadily reinforced by two brigades of General John Marmaduke's division, one commanded by William Cabell and one under Colton Green. Some of these troops had marched all the way downriver from Antoine—where Steele had been expected to cross—and it was some time before Marmaduke himself arrived opposite the ford. At daylight on April 4, Greene's and Cabell's brigades, some 12,000 strong, assaulted the picket line. Drake was sent forward again with the same three companies of the 36th Iowa and also took three companies of the 43rd Indiana, companies E, H and C. As they advanced they could see the troopers of the 1st Iowa cavalry trying to hold their position. Drake formed a battle line of his own just to their rear with his six companies of infantry. Companies D, G and A of the 36th deployed to the right of the road, and companies E, H and C of the 43rd Indiana deployed to the left flank on the other side of the road. The very dense timber provided excellent cover and concealment for the Union infantrymen. Drake meanwhile summoned a 2-gun section of Lieutenant Charles Peetz' 2nd Missouri Artillery to cross the ford and stand by for action on the road. Elsewhere, Colonel Charles Kittredge with the remaining 7 companies of the 36th Iowa remained in reserve at the river bank. Drake ordered the 1st Iowa troopers to send their mounts to the rear and to fall back and get in line with the infantry, which order was promptly carried out. In order to get at Drakes command positioned in the timber, the Confederates had to advance across an old orchard and doing so in line of battle they made easy targets for the federal infantry. Drake's entire forward command consisted of less than 400 men but they doggedly resisted the rebel incursion, repulsing two flanking maneuvers by Marmaduke early in the fight. Although McLean, the federal brigade commander, ordered a general retreat to the river bank, and while Kittredge withdrew his reserve companies, Drake thought the order inadvisable and told his six companies of infantry to "Stand Fast." Over the next two hours the federals were driven back farther and farther toward the river, and Marmaduke brought up an artillery battery and raked the woods with grape shot to try to dislodge Drake. At around 10:30 a.m. Marmaduke sent a third flanking force well to the left flank of the three companies of the 43rd Indiana, which began to disintegrate. As the Hoosiers ran to the rear they crossed an open field and were scattered. Seeing the companies of the 43rd starting to give way, Col. Kittredge got the 7 remaining companies of the 36th Iowa (B, C, E, F, H, I, and K) into line of battle and advanced them until they reached the edge of the field. There, Kittredge placed his right flank next to Peetz's battery and ordered his regiment to lie down behind a slight ridge in the field. Kittedge correctly assumed the rebels would charge across the field in an effort to capture Peetz's guns, When the rebels subsequently did just that, Kittredge ordered his men to stand up and fire, which they did in volleys, by company. The 36th Iowa had just been issued new Springfield .58 caliber rifled muskets before departing Little Rock and in this action they used them to deadly effect. This heavy federal musketry broke the back of Marmaduke's flank attack, repulsing the rebels with serious losses that included the capture of Rebel Lieutenant Fackler, Marmaduke's aid-de-camp. By this time, Brigadier General Samuel Rice arrived on the north shore of the Little Missouri river with his entire 1st Brigade and more artillery. Seeing this, Marmaduke concluded that he had insufficient numbers to stop the federals from crossing Elkins'Ferry. He withdrew Cabell's and Greene's brigades and marched southward toward Prairie D'Ane to join the main rebel army under Sterling Price.

The next day, the remainder of Steele's corps crossed the Little Missouri on a pontoon bridge. Augmented two days later by the arrival from Fort Smith of Brigadier General John M. Thayer's Frontier Division, they encamped a few days on the south side of the ford before marching south through the Little Missouri bottom toward the prairie. While Steele rested for a few days at the plantation home of the widow Cornelius, he obtained valuable intelligence from wounded and dying Confederates being treated there about the strength of the Confederate units in front of him. Reconnoitering from there, Federals observed the extensive log and earth breastworks along the northern edge of the prairie. Marching south from Cornelius plantation on 10 April, they encountered the line of battle and attacked with artillery, cavalry and infantry skirmishers, eventually driving the line back about a mile before being checked by the Confederates. Skirmishing continued throughout the afternoon of 11 April. In a delaying action, the Confederates fell back, with the intention of mounting a stand further south to defend their capital at Washington, where they expected to receive reinforcements from Kirby Smith at Shreveport.

The Union's VII Corps had transported inadequate provisions; finding little provender along the way, the men had to march from Little Rock on half-rations. They needed both animal forage and food for the soldiers. Steele's intelligence reports began to relay rumors that the Union forces under Banks that were converging on Shreveport had been repelled by Kirby Smith.

Steele had doubted the wisdom of marching into southwest Arkansas to support what he thought was Banks' ill-conceived Red River Campaign. He had delayed leaving Little Rock until receiving a rather blunt direct order from General Ulysses S. Grant, a former West Point classmate. Now, deep in enemy territory with his forces reduced to quarter rations, with little forage for his mules and horses, and struggling with muddy, rain-saturated roads, Steele grew increasingly doubtful of his ability to reach Shreveport. A resupply train had started from Little Rock to support Steele on 12 April, but those conditions meant it would probably be delayed in arriving. Additionally, if the rumors of Banks' defeat proved true, Steele knew Kirby Smith would be freed to make an about-face and turn his army northward to repel Steele with overwhelming force. Taking the counsel of his officers, Steele decided to divert his army east to take Camden, Arkansas where they hoped to capture provisions and await intelligence that would confirm or deny the rumors of Banks' defeat.

In a diversionary move, Steele ordered Thayer's Frontier Division to make a feint toward Washington, thereby drawing the enemy into a fight south of the prairie. The main part of his Union force rapidly diverted eastward on the Camden Road. Thayer's action was quickly discovered, however, enticing the Confederates into a rear guard action at the hamlet of Moscow, on the southeast edge of the prairie. Steele's main force, meanwhile, proceeded into Camden and seized the city with minimal opposition. But they found meager supplies and learned that Banks had been defeated at the Red River.

After suffering the loss of nearly 500 supply wagons and 1200 mules in bitter and ferocious ambushes upon Union supply trains at Poison Springs on 18 April, and Marks Mills on 25 April, Steele decided to retreat from south Arkansas in order to save his army. Steele's VII Corps moved north from Camden on the early morning of 27 April. Steele was pursued by the Confederates all the way to the Saline River, south of Little Rock. The campaign ended with the Battle of Jenkins Ferry on 29–30 April 1864.

== Aftermath ==
The site of the battle, the Battle of Prairie D' Ane Historic Site is listed on the National Register of Historic Places and is part of the Camden Expedition Sites National Historic Landmark.

== Preservation ==
The American Battlefield Trust and its partners have acquired and preserved 811 acres of the battlefield.

== See also ==
- List of American Civil War battles
- Troop engagements of the American Civil War, 1864
