= Camden Expedition =

1864 military campaign of the American Civil War

- Part of the American Civil War
- Operational scope: Strategic offensive
- Location: Southwest Arkansas; 33°35′06″N 92°50′39″W
- Commanded by: (United States) Maj. Gen. Frederick Steele
- Objective: Cooperate with Maj. Gen. Banks' movement against Shreveport
- Date: March 23 – May 3, 1864 (1 month, 1 week and 3 days)
- Executed by: Department of Arkansas and Seventh Army Corps
- Outcome: Confederate victory
- Location of Camden within Arkansas

The Camden Expedition (March 23 – May 3, 1864) was a failed military campaign conducted by the United States Army in southwest Arkansas during the American Civil War. The Union Army's strategic offensive was designed to cooperate with Major-General Nathaniel P. Banks' movement against Shreveport.

== Overview ==
The U.S. War Department, under the direction of Secretary of War Edwin M. Stanton, had developed a strategic goal to reassert Union control over Arkansas, Louisiana, and Texas. This was part of a much larger effort to move simultaneously against Confederate forces in a number of theaters. Separate Union columns were to destroy the remaining Confederate troops in south Arkansas and northern Louisiana, then join for an all-out push into Texas, essentially ending the war in that region.

The Arkansas phase of this Red River Campaign was entitled the Camden Expedition, an effort endorsed by Lieut. Gen. Ulysses S. Grant. The plan called for Maj. Gen. Frederick Steele's force to march to Shreveport, Louisiana, where it would link up with an amphibious expedition led by Maj. Gen. Nathaniel P. Banks and Rear Admiral David D. Porter, whose force was to advance up the Red River Valley; once joined, the Union force was to strike into Texas. Steele would garrison Shreveport while Banks forged ahead into northeastern Texas. But the two pincers never converged, and Steele's columns suffered terrible losses in a series of battles with Confederate forces led by Maj. Gen. Sterling Price and Gen. E. Kirby Smith.

== The campaign ==
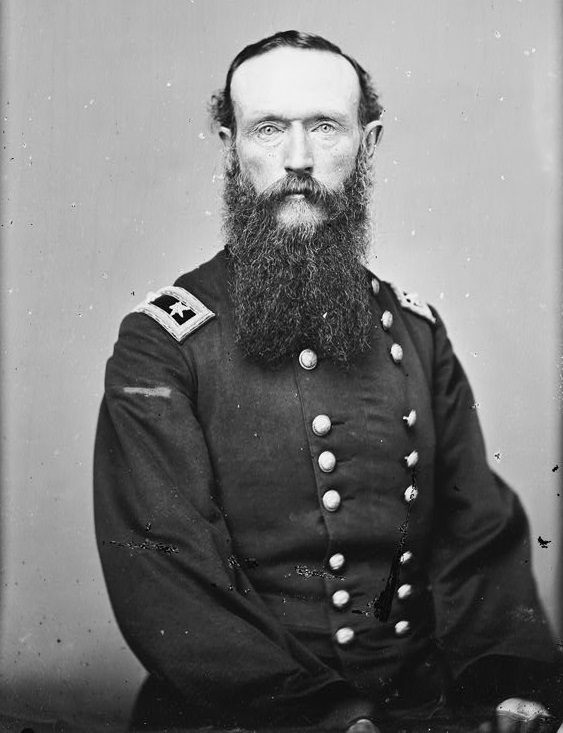
Maj. Gen. Frederick Steele, commander of the Department of Arkansas and Seventh Army Corps

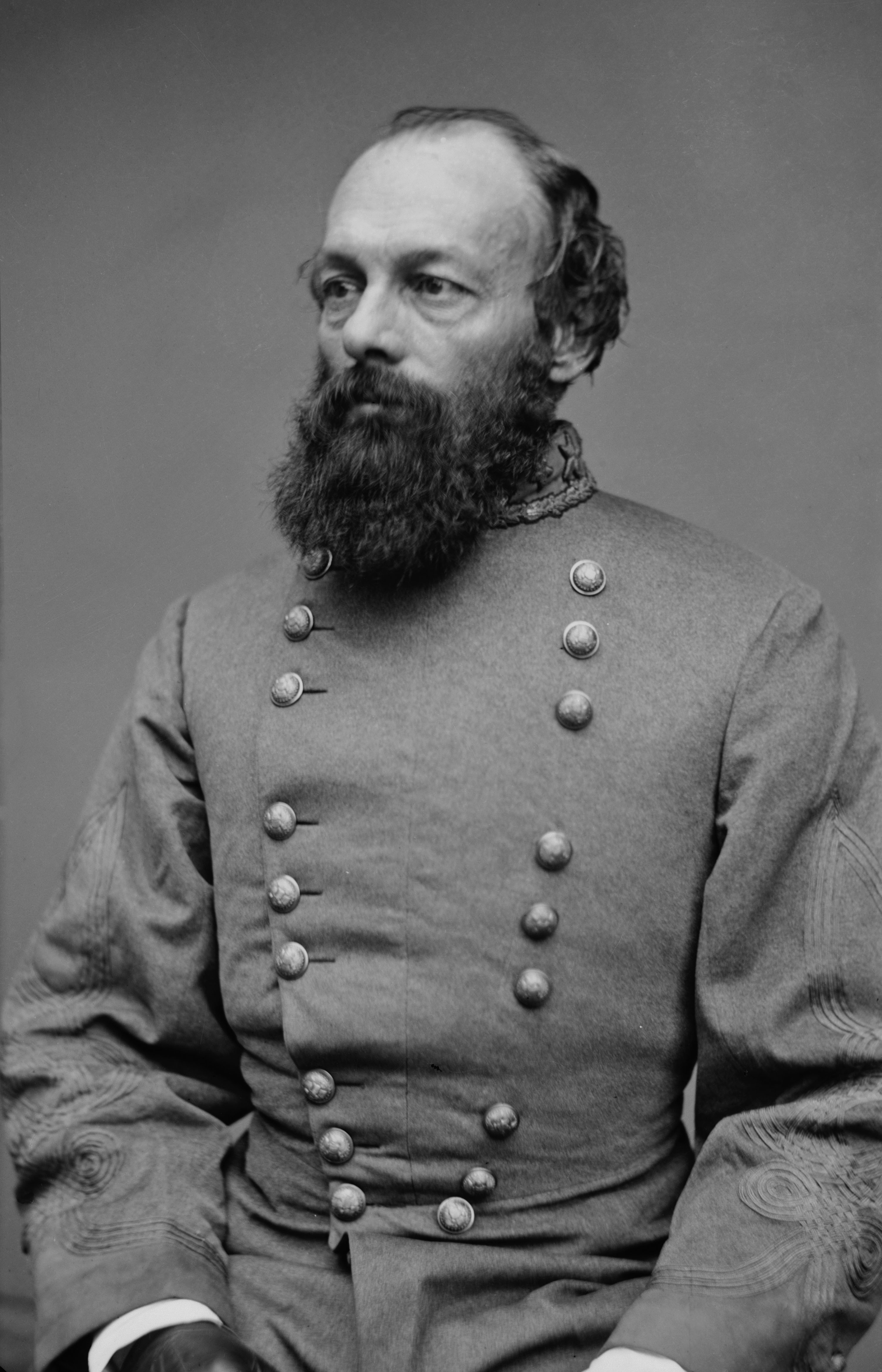
Gen. E. Kirby Smith's strategy was to isolate Banks' and Steele's armies and annihilate each one separately.

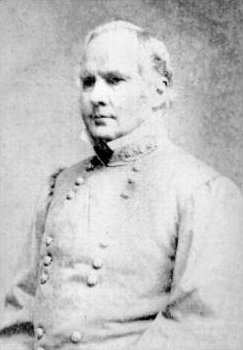
Led by Maj. Gen. Sterling Price, the Confederates fought a strong defensive campaign and stopped the Union advance at Camden.

Steele led a combined 8,500-man Union force of infantry, artillery and cavalry from the Little Rock Arsenal on March 23, 1864, with the objective of joining forces with Maj. Gen. Banks at Shreveport. Confederate forces in Arkansas were directed from Washington, where the Confederate government of the state relocated after the fall of Little Rock. Confederate Maj. Gen. Sterling Price ordered Brig. Gen. John S. Marmaduke to harry the Union column and to prevent it from crossing the Little Missouri as it moved toward Washington.

=== Action at Mount Elba ===
As a supporting effort, to help fix Confederate forces at Monticello, Arkansas, preventing them from opposing Steele's march to Camden, Arkansas, Col. Powell Clayton conducted a raid on Longview, Arkansas, a port on the Saline, southwest of Monticello. Clayton's cavalry force crossed the Saline at Mount Elba, Arkansas, after sweeping aside a small guard force. Clayton divided his forces and sent part to establish a blocking position to the west near Marks Mill. One hundred picked men under Lieutenants Greathouse and Young were then dispatched to destroy the Confederate pontoon bridge at Longview. On March 29, the lieutenants surprised and captured approximately 250 soldiers belonging to Brig. Gen. Thomas P. Dockery's brigade at Longview. Confederate forces in the area were now alerted to the presence of Clayton's raiders in the area and attempted to cut off Clayton's command by attacking their bridgehead at Mount Elba on March 30, 1864. Clayton was successful in re-crossing the Saline, defeating Confederate forces at the Battle of Mount Elba and returned to Pine Bluff, Arkansas, with over 260 prisoners. The first Union actions of the Union expedition was a complete success, but the rest of the expedition would not go as planned.

=== Engagement at Elkin's Ferry ===
Steele's route was through a thinly populated wilderness with little provisions. He hoped to occupy Camden, a port city on the Ouachita to re-supply. As all the bridges on the Little Missouri were impassable, the Union troops had to ford the muddy river. Steele's men reached Elkin's Ferry before the Confederates, but on April 3, they were attacked by Brig. Gen. Joseph O. Shelby's cavalry. The following day, Marmaduke's cavalry also attacked the Union forces as they were trying to cross the river. The Federals were able to fend off both of these attacks and then cross the river. The outnumbered Confederates were forced to withdraw, and Maj. Gen. Price established a defensive position, lightly fortified by earthworks, on the road between Elkin's Ferry and Washington at the western edge of the sparsely populated Prairie d'Ane, a roughly circular area of prairie surrounded by woodlands.

=== Skirmish at Prairie D'Ane ===
After waiting for the arrival of reinforcements, Maj. Gen. Steele advanced on April 9, but was stopped at Prairie D'Ane, a series of encounters that ended on April 12. Price's Confederates returned to Prairie D'Ane on April 13, falling upon Steele's rearguard under Thayer. After a four-hour battle, Price disengaged, and Steele's column continued to Camden. Steele made a feint toward Washington, but then withdrew to Camden, in order to resupply his army, which was then on half-rations. Price had stripped Camden of personnel in order to defend Washington, and the Union forces occupied the city on April 15 against no significant opposition, but found no supplies awaiting him.

=== Engagement at Poison Spring ===
After a two-day wait, Maj. Gen. Steele sent out foraging parties into the countryside and awaited news from Banks. However, Banks was in retreat, having been defeated at the Battle of Mansfield, and now more of Smith's forces were heading into Arkansas to intercept Steele. Dwindling supplies for his army at Camden forced Steele to send out a 1,200-man foraging party to gather corn that the Confederates had stored about twenty miles away. After loading the corn into over 200 wagons and proceeding about 5 miles on April 18, Col. James M. Williams's party was savagely attacked by Marmaduke's and Brig. Gen. Samuel B. Maxey's Confederates at the Poison Spring. Williams was forced to retreat northward into a marsh, where his men finally regrouped and fell back to Camden, minus the wagonloads of much needed corn.

=== Action at Marks’ Mills ===
Steele was relieved on April 20 when a wagon train arrived from Pine Bluff with welcome supplies. One week later, the Battle of Marks' Mills resulted in the capture of 2,000 more of Steele's men and many more wagons. Steele decided to abandon Camden under the cover of darkness and retreated to Little Rock on April 26. Three days later, he reached the Saline River at Jenkins' Ferry and began constructing a pontoon bridge.

=== Engagement at Jenkins' Ferry ===
Smith's Confederates arrived at Jenkins' Ferry on April 30 and repeatedly attacked the retreating Federals in windy and rainy conditions. Steele repulsed the attacks and finally crossed with what was left of his force, destroying the bridge to prevent Smith from following. He was compelled to abandon most of his remaining supply wagons in the swamp north of the river. A badly chagrined Steele finally reached his base at the Little Rock Arsenal on May 3.

== Aftermath ==
The Camden Expedition was perhaps the greatest Federal military disaster in Arkansas throughout the war. Union forces suffered over 2,500 casualties, lost hundreds of wagons and failed to take Shreveport or Texas. Confederate forces freely roamed rural Arkansas, while the Federals stayed in their fortifications at Fort Smith, Pine Bluff, Helena, and Little Rock. Confederate success in Arkansas did not come without a cost, however. Resources might have been used more effectively against Porter and Banks while the Union fleet was delayed due to low water on the Red River. Instead, Porter's fleet was able to escape nearly intact.

== Battlefield preservation ==
Nine nationally significant historic places in Clark, Cleveland, Grant, Hempstead, Nevada, Ouachita, and Pulaski counties, where events of the Union army's disastrous Camden Expedition occurred, are individually listed on the U.S. National Register of Historic Places. They were collectively designated a National Historic Landmark on April 19, 1994.

== Image gallery ==
Camden Expedition gallery

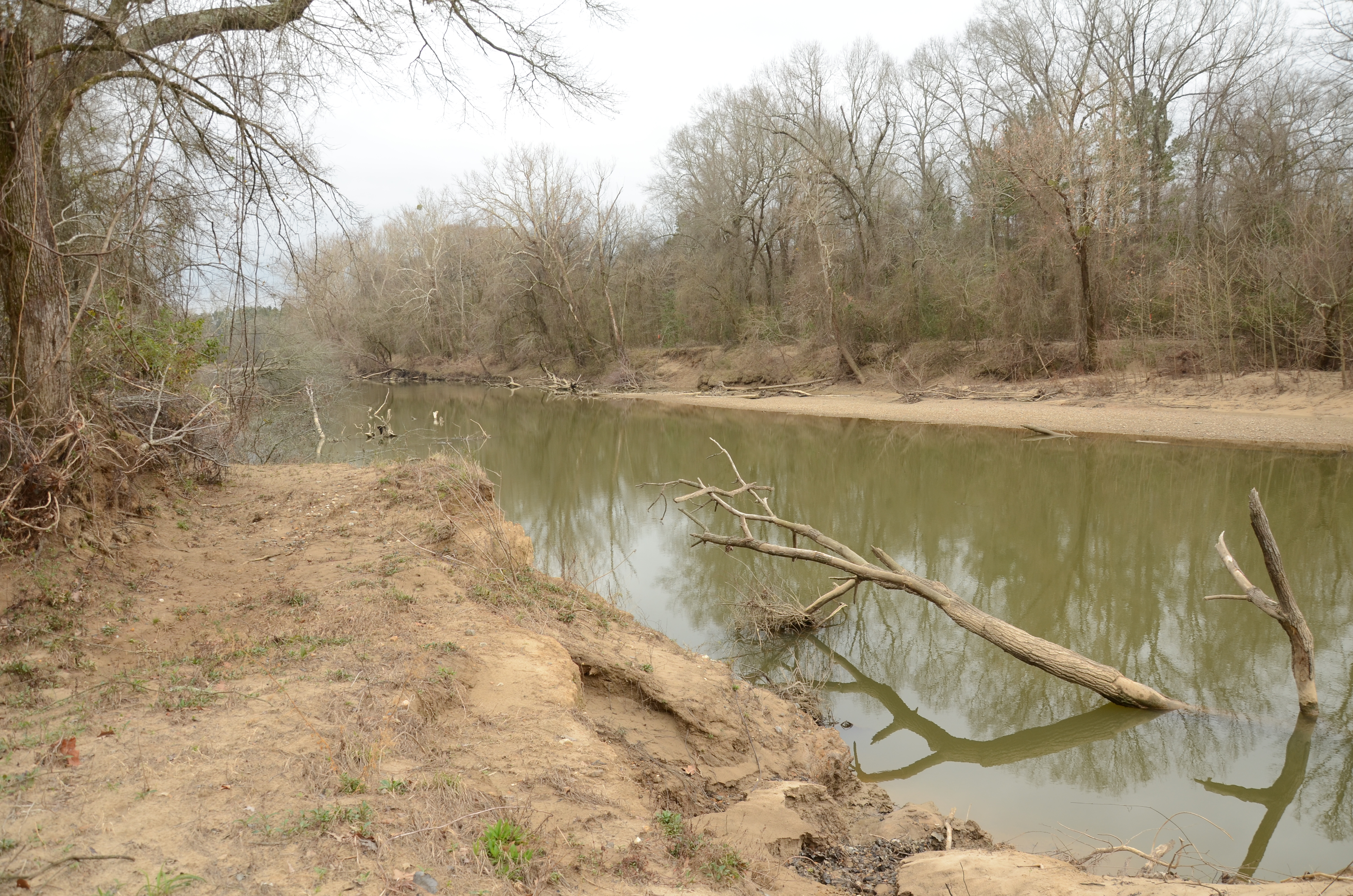
Elkin's Ferry

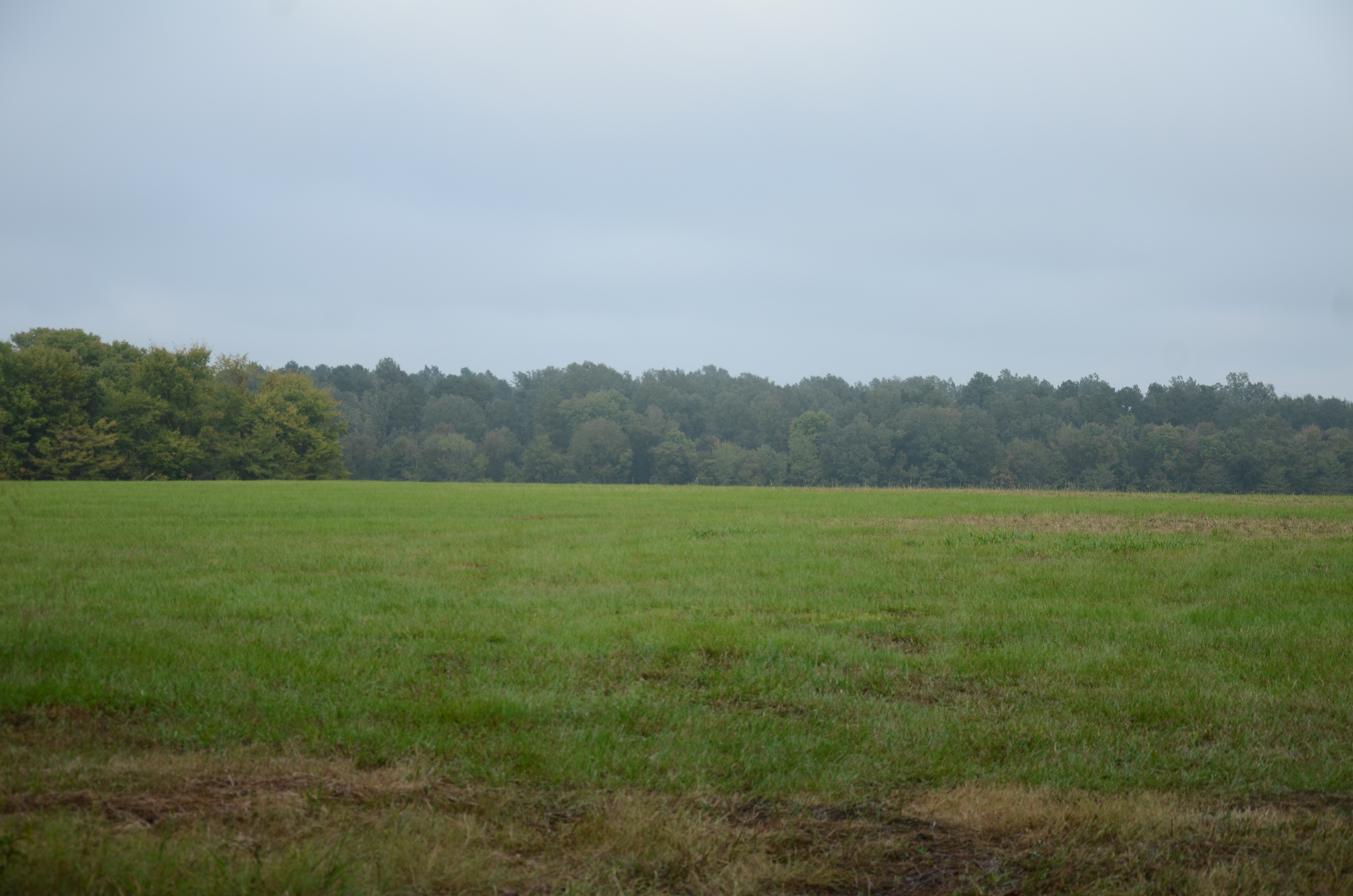
Prairie D'Ane

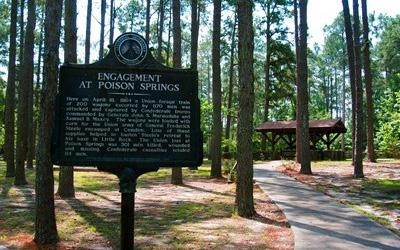
Poison Springs

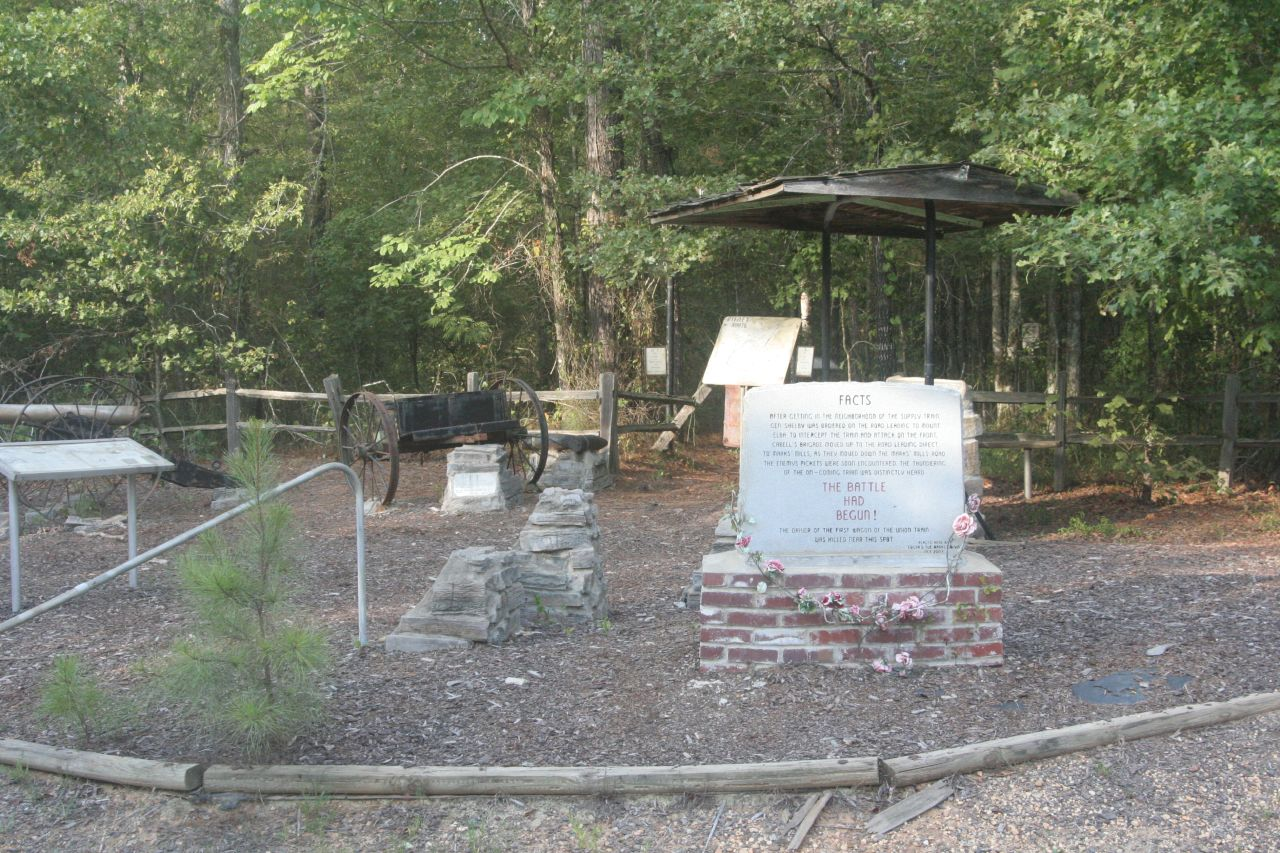
Marks' Mills

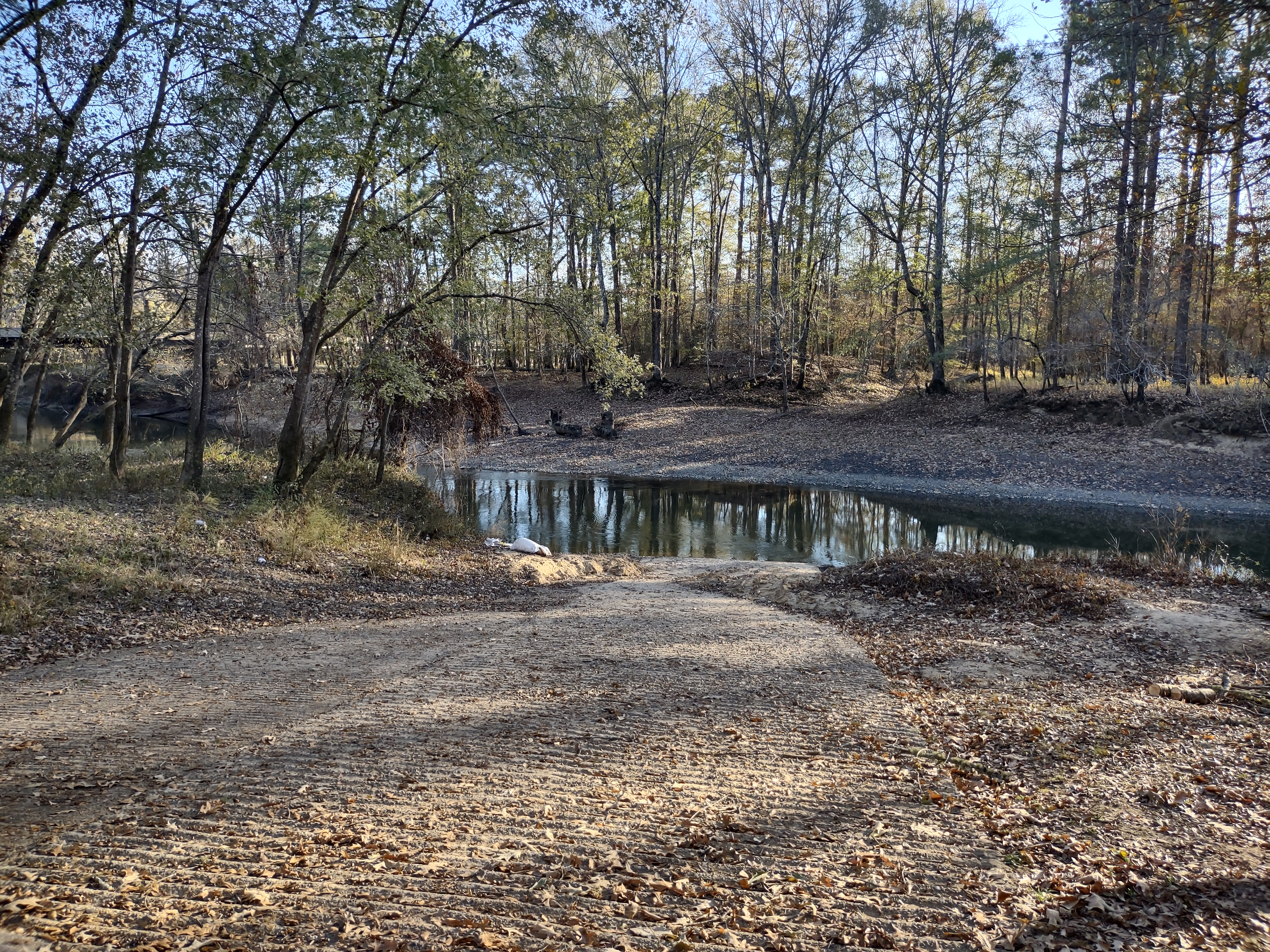
Jenkins' Ferry

== See also ==
- Arkansas Heritage Trails System
- Troop engagements of the American Civil War, 1864
