= Clifton Historic District =

Clifton Historic District may refer to:

- Clifton and Greening Streets Historic District, Camden, Arkansas, listed on the NRHP in Ouachita County, Arkansas
- Clifton Historic District (Louisville, Kentucky), listed on the NRHP in Jefferson County, Kentucky
- Clifton-McCraken Rural Historic District, Versailles, Kentucky, listed on the NRHP in Woodford County, Kentucky
- Baltimore East/South Clifton Park Historic District, Baltimore, Maryland, listed on the NRHP in Maryland
- Clifton Heights Historic District, Natchez, Mississippi, listed on the NRHP in Adams County, Mississippi
- Clifton Avenue Historic District (Cincinnati, Ohio), listed on the NRHP in Ohio
- Clifton Historic District (Clifton, Virginia), listed on the NRHP in Fairfax County, Virginia

== See also ==
- Clifton (disambiguation)
