= Leake–Ingham Building =

- U.S. National Register of Historic Places
- U.S. Historic district – Contributing property
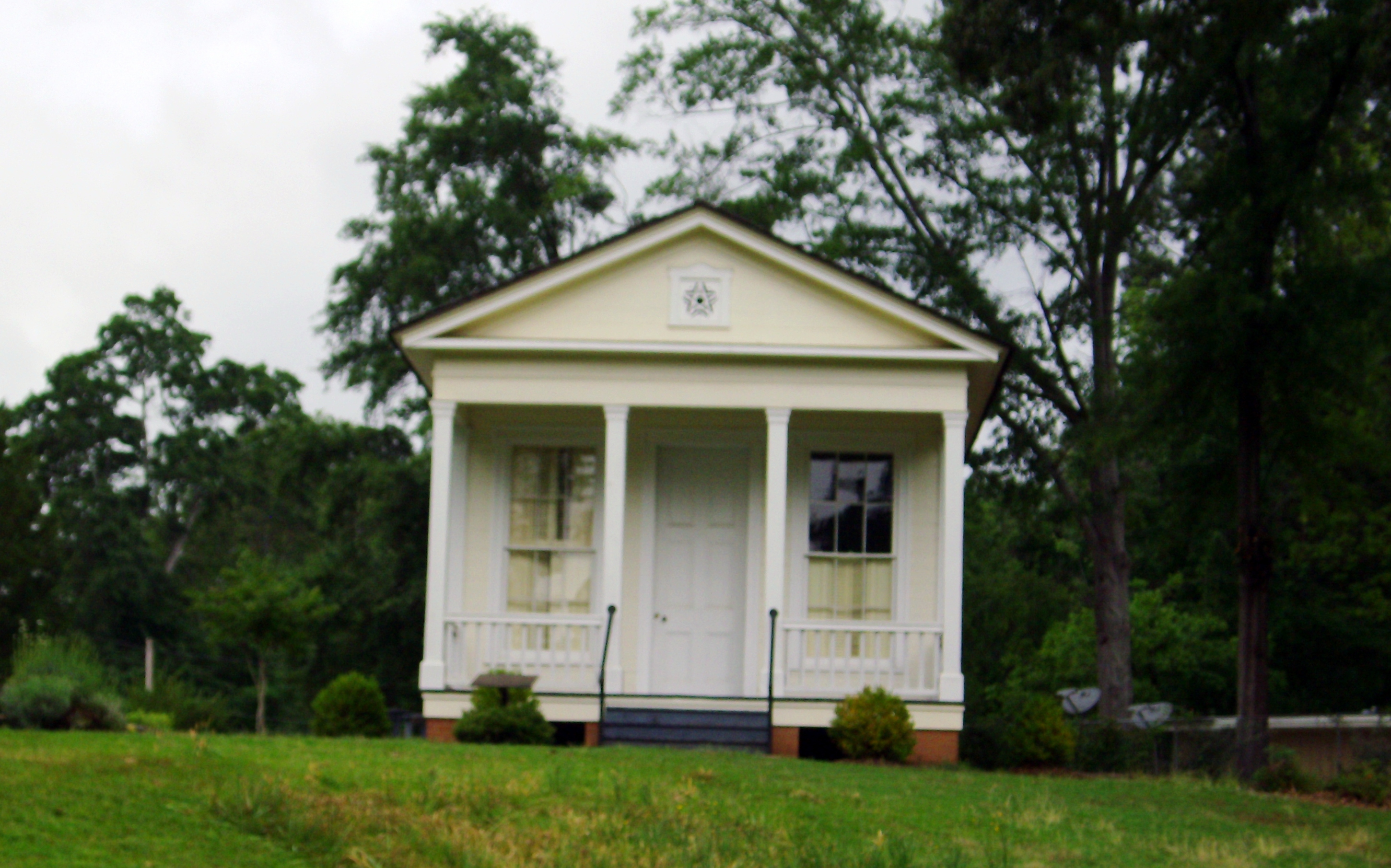

- Location within Arkansas Location within the United States
- Location: 926 Washington St., NW, Camden, Arkansas
- Coordinates: 33°35′5″N 92°50′38″W
- Area: less than one acre
- Built: 1850
- Architectural style: Greek Revival
- Part of: Washington Street Historic District (ID09001256)
- NRHP reference No.: 75000399

Significant dates
- Added to NRHP: May 2, 1975
- Designated CP: January 22, 2010

The Leake–Ingham Building is a historic commercial building in Camden, Arkansas, United States. It is located behind the McCollum-Chidester House at 926 Washington Street NW, and is part of the Ouachita County Historical Society Museum. It is one of the oldest commercial buildings in Camden. The single-story Greek Revival structure was built c. 1850 by William Leake, a prominent Camden attorney, and has a distinctive Greek temple front. It was originally located on a prominent corner of the city, at Washington and Harrison Streets. Leake operated a law practice from the building until 1866 with various partners, after which it was used to house government offices, and later Camden's first library. Threatened with demolition in the 1950s, it was moved several times before its acquisition by the historical society.

The building was listed on the National Register of Historic Places in 1975.

== See also ==
- National Register of Historic Places listings in Ouachita County, Arkansas
