= Sidney A. Umsted House =

Historic house in Arkansas, United States

- U.S. National Register of Historic Places
- U.S. Historic district – Contributing property
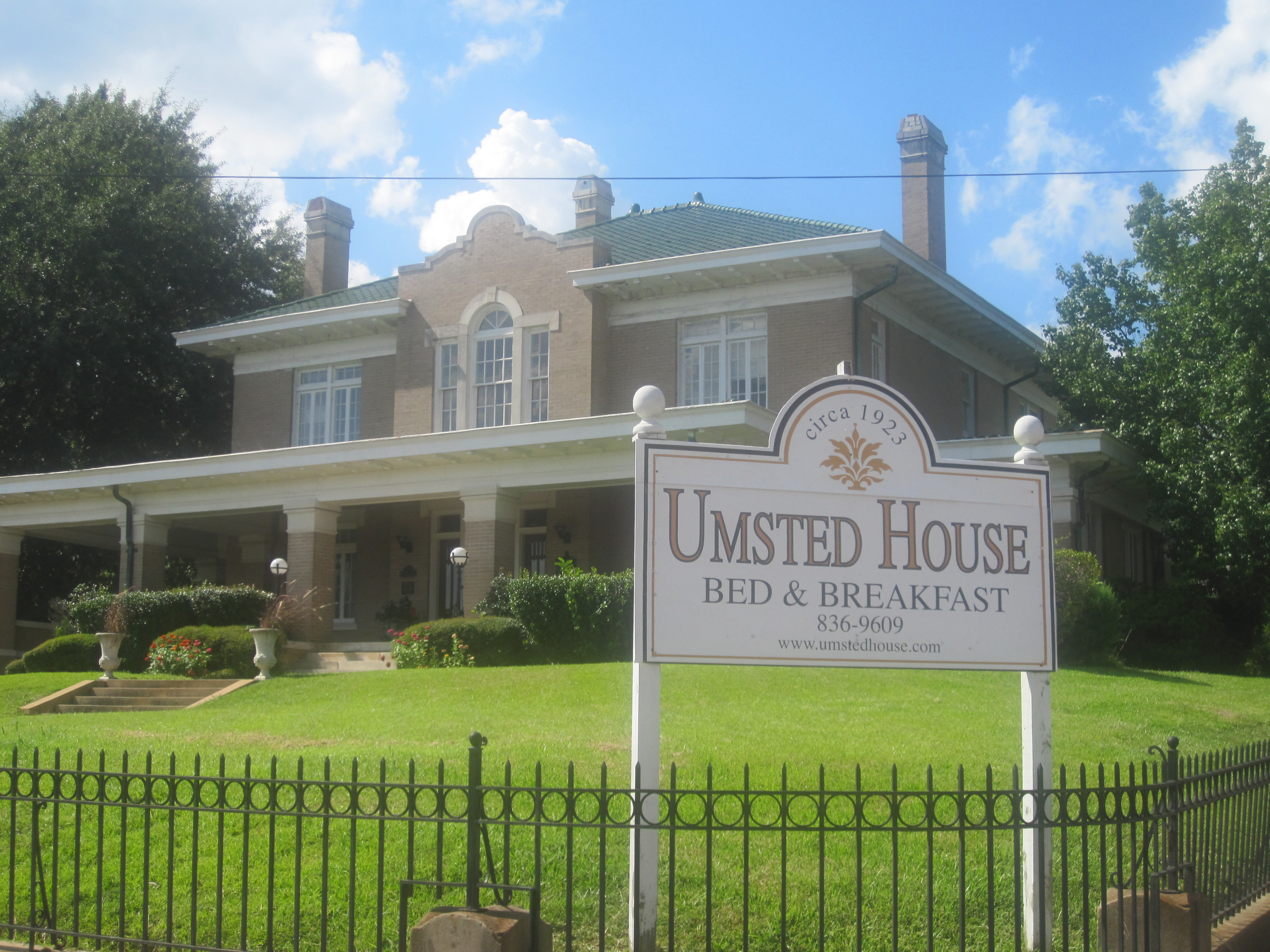

- Location within Arkansas Location within the United States
- Location: 404 Washington St., Camden, Arkansas
- Coordinates: 33°35′6″N 92°50′4″W
- Area: less than one acre
- Built: 1923
- Architect: Witt, Seibert & Halsey; Johnson and Wagner
- Architectural style: Mission Revival/Spanish Revival
- Part of: Washington Street Historic District (ID09001256)
- NRHP reference No.: 95000789

Significant dates
- Added to NRHP: June 30, 1995
- Designated CP: January 22, 2010

The Sidney A. Umsted House is a historic house at 404 Washington Street in Camden, Arkansas. The two story brick house was built in 1923–24, and is one of the best local examples of Mediterranean Revival architecture in the city. Sidney Umsted, for whom the house was built, became instantly wealthy with the discovery in 1922 of oil in nearby Smackover, and became one of Arkansas' wealthiest men. The house is faced in beige brick, and features a green tile roof.

The house was listed on the National Register of Historic Places in 1995. It is now a bed and breakfast inn.

== See also ==
- National Register of Historic Places listings in Ouachita County, Arkansas
