= Camden Confederate Monument =

- U.S. National Register of Historic Places
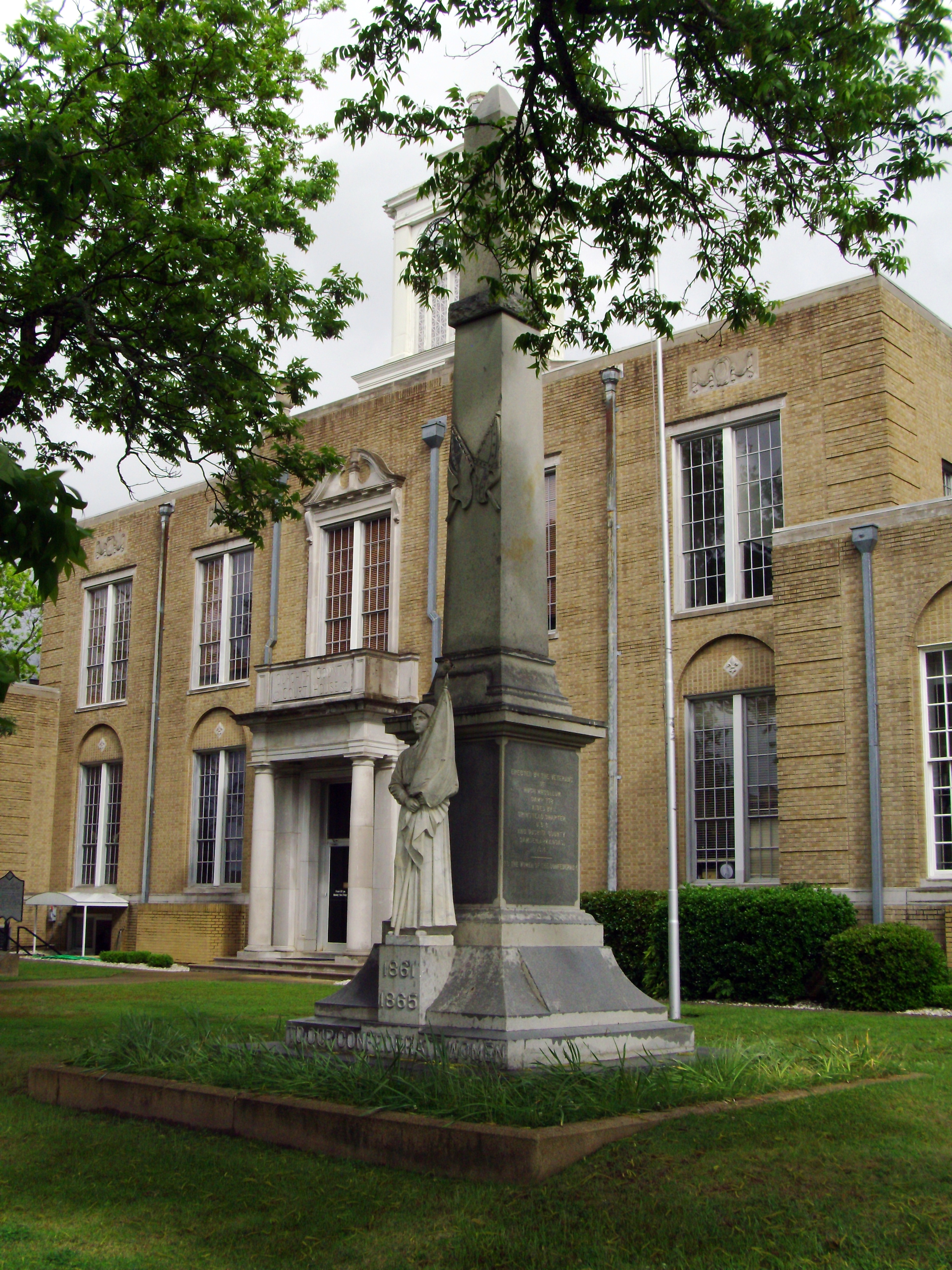

- Location within Arkansas Location within the United States
- Location: Courthouse Lawn, Jefferson St. between Harrison St. and Scott Alley, Camden, Arkansas
- Coordinates: 33°35′3″N 92°49′49″W
- Area: less than one acre
- Built: 1915
- Architectural style: Classical Revival
- MPS: Civil War Commemorative Sculpture MPS
- NRHP reference No.: 96000462
- Added to NRHP: May 7, 1996

The Camden Confederate Monument, also known as the Confederate Women's Memorial, is located on the grounds of the Ouachita County Courthouse in Camden, Arkansas. The sculpture, carved out of Italian marble, depicts a woman dressed in the period of the American Civil War, standing with her feet together, clutching a flagpole. The sculpture is mounted on a block of North Carolina granite, next to a tall (28-foot (8.5 m)) obelisk. The statue is 5 feet (1.5 m) tall. The obelisk is inscribed on three sides, recognizing the valor of women in the Confederate cause, and the organizations that funded the memorial's construction. The memorial was erected in 1914 by the local chapters of the United Confederate Veterans and the United Daughters of the Confederacy.

The monument was listed on the National Register of Historic Places in 1996.

== See also ==
- National Register of Historic Places listings in Ouachita County, Arkansas
