= National Register of Historic Places listings in Ouachita County, Arkansas =

Location of Ouachita County in Arkansas

This is a list of the National Register of Historic Places listings in Ouachita County, Arkansas.

This is intended to be a complete list of the properties and districts on the National Register of Historic Places in Ouachita County, Arkansas, United States. The locations of National Register properties and districts for which the latitude and longitude coordinates are included below, may be seen in a map.

There are 41 properties and districts listed on the National Register in the county, including 3 distinct parts of one discontiguous National Historic Landmark District.

Contents: Counties in Arkansas
- Arkansas
- Ashley
- Baxter
- Benton
- Boone
- Bradley
- Calhoun
- Carroll
- Chicot
- Clark
- Clay
- Cleburne
- Cleveland
- Columbia
- Conway
- Craighead
- Crawford
- Crittenden
- Cross
- Dallas
- Desha
- Drew
- Faulkner
- Franklin
- Fulton
- Garland
- Grant
- Greene
- Hempstead
- Hot Spring
- Howard
- Independence
- Izard
- Jackson
- Jefferson
- Johnson
- Lafayette
- Lawrence
- Lee
- Lincoln
- Little River
- Logan
- Lonoke
- Madison
- Marion
- Miller
- Mississippi
- Monroe
- Montgomery
- Nevada
- Newton
- Ouachita
- Perry
- Phillips
- Pike
- Poinsett
- Polk
- Pope
- Prairie
- Pulaski (Little Rock)
- Randolph
- St. Francis
- Saline
- Scott
- Searcy
- Sebastian
- Sevier
- Sharp
- Stone
- Union
- Van Buren
- Washington
- White
- Woodruff
- Yell

This National Park Service list is complete through NPS recent listings posted December 19, 2025.

== Current listings ==
	Name on the Register	Image	Date listed	Location	City or town	Description
1	Arkansas Highway 57 Bridge	Arkansas Highway 57 Bridge	September 28, 2005 (#05001078)	Formerly carried Highway 57 over a Union Pacific railroad line 33°24′46″N 93°04′10″W	Stephens	
2	Bearden Waterworks	Bearden Waterworks	October 5, 2006 (#06000908)	Junction of N. 2nd and N. Cedar; 33°43′39″N 92°37′01″W	Bearden	
3	Bragg House	Bragg House	March 1, 1974 (#74000487)	West of Camden on Highway 4; 33°34′52″N 92°53′56″W	Camden	
4	Capt. John T. Burkett House	Capt. John T. Burkett House	June 3, 1998 (#98000620)	607 County Road 65; 33°26′27″N 92°47′39″W	Frenchport	
5	Camden Commercial Historic District		November 2, 2022 (#100008151)	Roughly Washington St. between Harrison and Madison Sts., and Adams Ave. between Washington and Jefferson Sts. 33°35′10″N 92°49′47″W	Camden	
6	Camden Confederate Monument	Camden Confederate Monument	May 7, 1996 (#96000462)	Courthouse Lawn, Jefferson St. between Harrison St. and Scott Alley; 33°35′03″N 92°49′49″W	Camden	
7	Camden Water Battery		May 30, 2007 (#07000615)	Address Restricted	Camden	Civil War fortifications along the riverfront
8	Clifton and Greening Streets Historic District	Clifton and Greening Streets Historic District	August 14, 1998 (#98000911)	Roughly bounded by Clifton and Greening Sts., and Dallas and Cleveland Aves. Boundary increase I (listed November 19, 2001): 411 and 417 Greening St. Boundary increase II (listed September 19, 2007): 622, 630, and 634 Clifton St., 206 Dallas Ave., and 502 Greening St. Boundary increase III (listed September 23, 2011): 140 California St. 33°35′13″N 92°50′10″W	Camden	
9	Elliott-Meek House	Elliott-Meek House	March 1, 1974 (#74000483)	761 Washington St. 33°35′02″N 92°50′30″W	Camden	
10	Fort Lookout	Fort Lookout	April 19, 1994 (#94001183)	Southern bank of the Ouachita River, about 1.0 mile west of U.S. Highway 79; 33°36′00″N 92°50′04″W	Camden	One of the Camden Expedition Sites, a National Historic Landmark consisting of sites in several counties
11	Fort Southerland	Fort Southerland	April 19, 1994 (#94001184)	Roughly bounded by Lear Ave., Bradley Ferry Rd., and Progress St. 33°34′25″N 92°49′03″W	Camden	One of the Camden Expedition Sites, a National Historic Landmark consisting of sites in several counties
12	Graham-Gaughan-Betts House	Graham-Gaughan-Betts House	October 18, 1974 (#74000484)	710 Washington St. 33°35′05″N 92°50′24″W	Camden	
13	Green Cemetery		May 5, 2017 (#16000653)	West of County Road 1; 33°25′56″N 93°05′55″W	Stephens	
14	Harvey's Grocery and Texaco Station	Harvey's Grocery and Texaco Station	May 25, 2001 (#01000524)	3241 Highway 24; 33°36′31″N 92°54′43″W	Camden	
15	Hickman House	Hickman House	March 2, 2006 (#06000090)	3568 Mt. Holly Rd. 33°30′29″N 92°51′09″W	Camden	
16	Holt-Poindexter Store Building	Holt-Poindexter Store Building	October 23, 1986 (#86002948)	County Road; 33°27′08″N 93°01′24″W	Stephens	
17	The HOMER (Shipwreck)		September 14, 2002 (#02000979)	Address Restricted	Camden	Paddlewheel steamer scuttled during the Civil War
18	Ben Laney Bridge	Ben Laney Bridge	June 9, 2000 (#00000633)	U.S. Highway 79B over the Ouachita River; 33°35′47″N 92°49′07″W	Camden	
19	Leake-Ingham Building	Leake-Ingham Building	May 2, 1975 (#75000399)	926 Washington St., NW. 33°35′05″N 92°50′38″W	Camden	Law office building, now a museum building behind the McCollum-Chidester House
20	Lester And Haltom No. 1 Well Site		April 3, 1976 (#76000442)	Northeast of Stephens on Old Wire Rd. (County Road 3); 33°25′43″N 93°00′45″W	Stephens	Site of the first oil discovery in Arkansas
21	McCollum-Chidester House	McCollum-Chidester House	June 24, 1971 (#71000127)	926 Washington St., NW. 33°35′05″N 92°50′32″W	Camden	Ouachita County Historical Society museum
22	Missouri Pacific Railroad Depot-Camden	Missouri Pacific Railroad Depot-Camden	June 11, 1992 (#92000605)	Southwestern corner of the junction of Main and 1st Sts. 33°34′56″N 92°49′40″W	Camden	
23	Oakland Cemetery	Oakland Cemetery	June 9, 2000 (#00000634)	100 block of Maul Rd., bounded by Pearl St. and Madison Ave. 33°35′36″N 92°49′59″W	Camden	
24	Oakland Farm	Oakland Farm	March 24, 1978 (#78003062)	South of Camden at Tate and Oakland Sts. 33°32′32″N 92°50′50″W	Camden	
25	Old Camden Post Office	Old Camden Post Office	May 2, 1977 (#77000263)	133 Washington St., SW. 33°35′09″N 92°49′49″W	Camden	1895 brick post office
26	Ouachita County Courthouse	Ouachita County Courthouse	November 13, 1989 (#89001958)	145 Jefferson Ave. 33°35′04″N 92°49′49″W	Camden	
27	Ouachita County Training School		September 12, 2023 (#100009343)	740 Ouachita Rd. 589; 33°43′59″N 92°36′17″W	Bearden	
28	Poison Spring State Park	Poison Spring State Park	December 3, 1969 (#69000036)	Northwest of Camden; 33°38′45″N 93°01′02″W	Chidester	
29	Benjamin T. Powell House	Benjamin T. Powell House	January 21, 1974 (#74000485)	305 California Ave. 33°34′52″N 92°49′59″W	Camden	
30	Richmond-Tufts House	Richmond-Tufts House	December 2, 1977 (#77000264)	Northwest of Camden on Highway 24; 33°36′25″N 92°54′31″W	Camden	
31	Rumph House	Rumph House	September 25, 2003 (#03000948)	717 Washington St. 33°35′03″N 92°50′25″W	Camden	
32	St. John's Episcopal Church	St. John's Episcopal Church	January 24, 2017 (#100000556)	117 Harrison St. 33°35′10″N 92°49′54″W	Camden	
33	Rowland B. Smith House	Rowland B. Smith House	January 21, 1974 (#74000486)	234 Agee St. 33°34′54″N 92°50′38″W	Camden	
34	Spring-Harrison Historic District		January 11, 2021 (#100006026)	Spring St. roughly between Greening and Thompson Sts.' Clifton St. roughly between Spring and Harrison Sts., and Harrison St. roughly between Van Buren and Clifton Sts. 33°35′13″N 92°49′58″W	Camden	
35	Standard Oil Company Oil Station Pumphouse		September 16, 2022 (#100008150)	505 East Washington St. 33°35′21″N 92°49′29″W	Camden	
36	Tate's Barn	Tate's Barn	November 9, 1972 (#72000207)	902 Tate St. 33°32′30″N 92°50′41″W	Camden	
37	Tate's Bluff Fortification		December 31, 2002 (#02001628)	Address Restricted	Tate's Bluff	
38	Two Bayou Methodist Church and Cemetery	Two Bayou Methodist Church and Cemetery	July 9, 1998 (#98000830)	County Road 125; 33°32′42″N 92°57′44″W	Camden	
39	Tyson Family Commercial Building	Tyson Family Commercial Building	November 21, 1994 (#94001339)	151 Adams St., SE. 33°35′04″N 92°49′45″W	Camden	
40	Sidney A. Umsted House	Sidney A. Umsted House	June 30, 1995 (#95000789)	404 Washington St. 33°35′06″N 92°50′04″W	Camden	
41	Washington Street Historic District	Washington Street Historic District	January 22, 2010 (#09001256)	404-926 W. Washington, 619-816 Graham, 116-132 N. Cleveland, 131-139 N. Agee and 132 N. California; also N & S Agee St. roughly between Clifton & Maple Sts. 33°35′05″N 92°50′17″W	Camden	Second set of addresses represent a boundary increase approved May 21, 2018.

== See also ==
- List of National Historic Landmarks in Arkansas
- National Register of Historic Places listings in Arkansas
