= Graham-Gaughan-Betts House =

Historic house in Arkansas, United States

- U.S. National Register of Historic Places
- U.S. Historic district – Contributing property
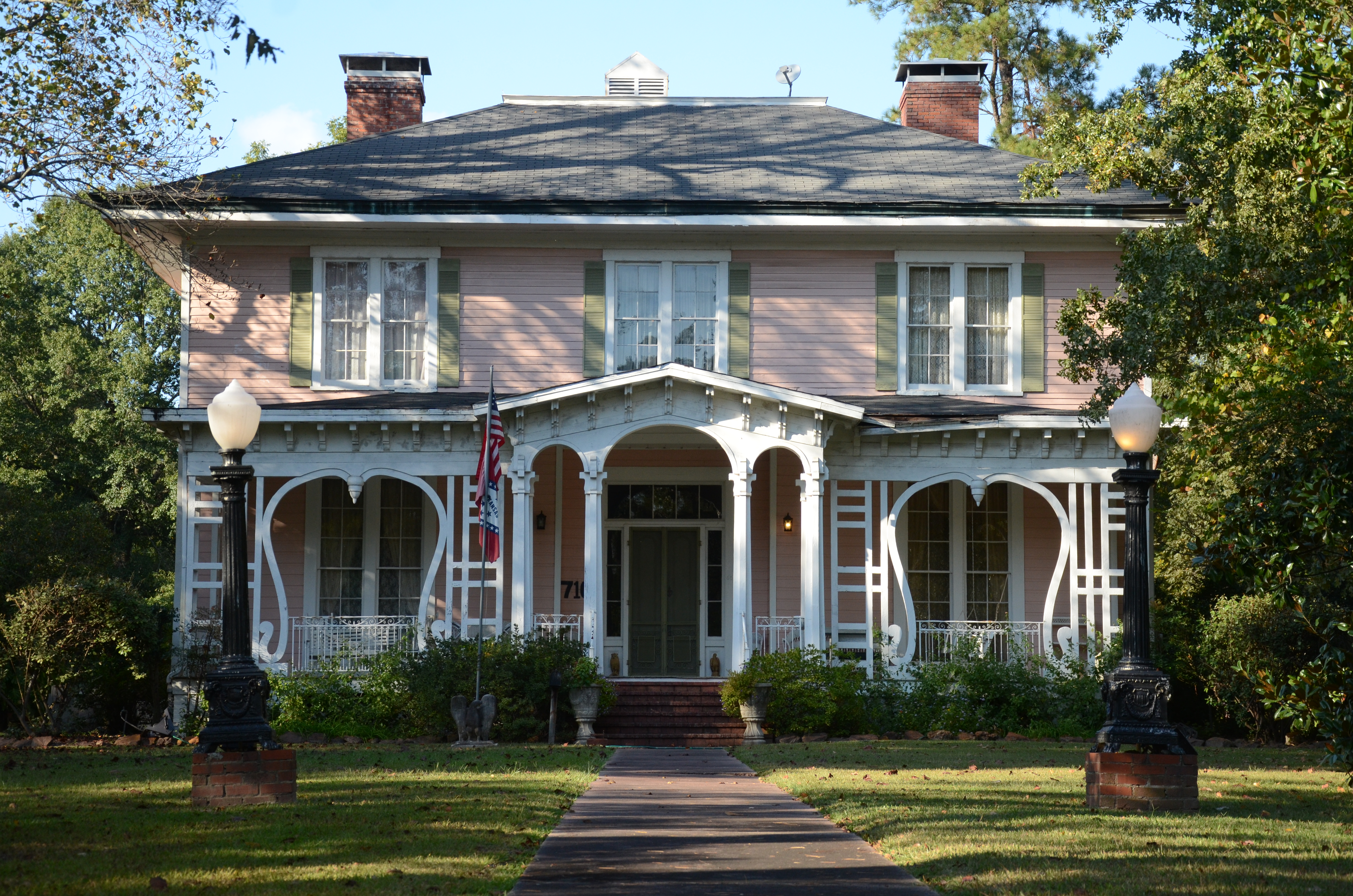

- Location within Arkansas Location within the United States
- Location: 710 Washington St., Camden, Arkansas
- Coordinates: 33°35′5″N 92°50′24″W
- Area: less than one acre
- Built: 1858
- Built by: Emmanuel Emmanuel (interior carpentry)
- Part of: Washington Street Historic District (ID09001256)
- NRHP reference No.: 74000484

Significant dates
- Added to NRHP: October 18, 1974
- Designated CP: January 22, 2010

The Graham-Gaughan-Betts House is a historic house at 710 Washington Street in Camden, Arkansas. The two story wood-frame house was built in 1858 by Major Joseph Graham. It is particularly notable for its well-preserved interior woodwork, and its elaborately decorated front porch.

The house was listed on the National Register of Historic Places in 1974. It was later listed as a contributing property to the Washington Street Historic District.

== See also ==
- National Register of Historic Places listings in Ouachita County, Arkansas
