= Rumph =

Rumph may refer to:

== People ==
- Alice Rumph (1878–1978), American painter
- Chris Rumph (born 1971), American football coach
- Chris Rumph II (born 1998), American football player
- Mike Rumph (born 1979), American football player
- Rumph., taxonomic author abbreviation of Georg Eberhard Rumphius (1627–1702), German-born botanist

== Places ==
- Rumph House, a historic house in Camden, Arkansas
- Rumph Mortuary, a historic commercial building in El Dorado, Arkansas
