= Elliott-Meek House =

Historic house in Arkansas, United States

- U.S. National Register of Historic Places
- U.S. Historic district – Contributing property
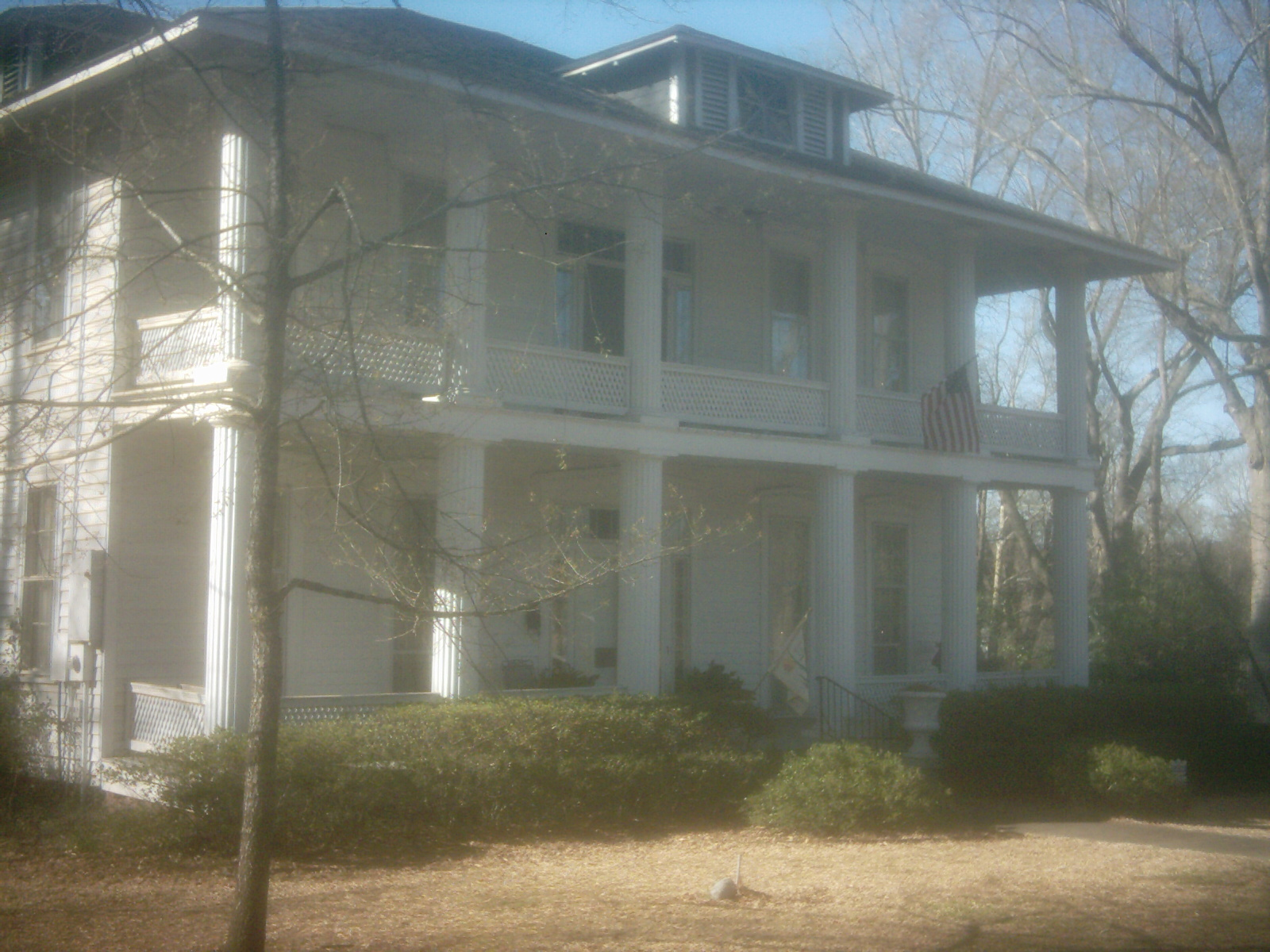

- Location within Arkansas Location within the United States
- Location: 761 Washington St., Camden, Arkansas
- Coordinates: 33°35′2″N 92°50′30″W
- Area: less than one acre
- Built: 1857
- Architectural style: Greek Revival
- Part of: Washington Street Historic District (ID09001256)
- NRHP reference No.: 74000483

Significant dates
- Added to NRHP: March 1, 1974
- Designated CP: January 22, 2010

The Elliott-Meek House is a historic house at 761 Washington Street in Camden, Arkansas. The two-story wood-frame house was built in 1857 by James Thomas Elliott, a local judge and later state senator. It is a well-preserved example of Camden's pre-Civil War prosperity, and a good example of Greek Revival styling. It also has triple-hung sash windows on its main facade, a rarity in the state.

The house was listed on the National Register of Historic Places in 1974.

== See also ==
- National Register of Historic Places listings in Ouachita County, Arkansas
