= Camden station (Arkansas) =

- Missouri-Pacific Railroad Depot-Camden
- U.S. National Register of Historic Places
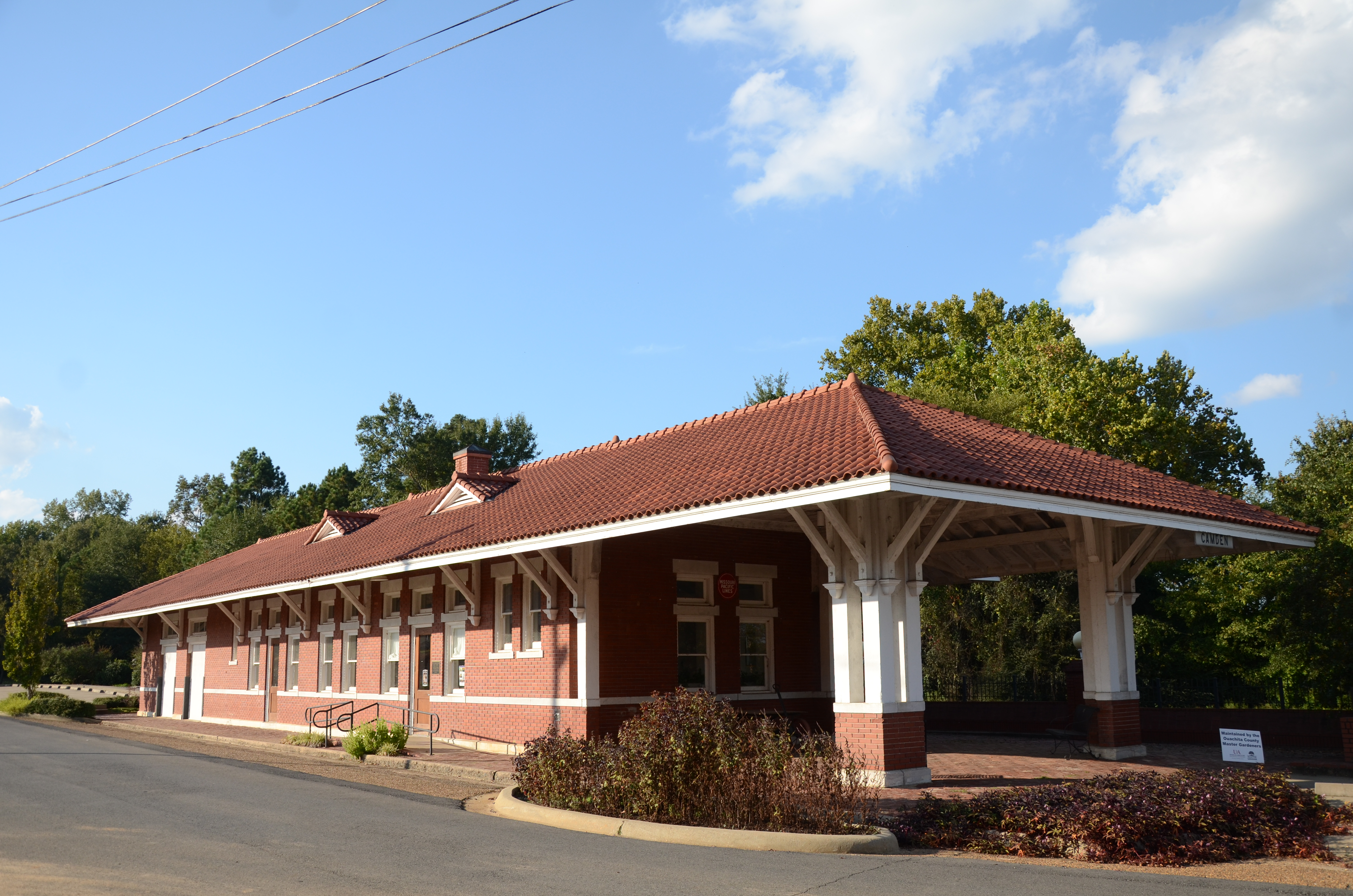

- Location within Arkansas Location within the United States
- Location: SW corner of Adams Street and Stadium Drive, Camden, Arkansas
- Coordinates: 33°34′56″N 92°49′40″W
- Area: less than one acre
- Built: 1917
- Built by: Missouri-Pacific Railroad
- Architectural style: Late 19th And 20th Century Revivals
- MPS: Historic Railroad Depots of Arkansas MPS
- NRHP reference No.: 92000605
- Added to NRHP: June 11, 1992

The former Missouri-Pacific Railroad Depot in Camden, Arkansas, is located at the southwest corner of Adams Street and Stadium Drive in the city's business district. It is a single-story brick building with Mediterranean Revival styling built c. 1917 during a major expansion of the Missouri-Pacific Railroad. ("The Missouri-Pacific Railroad Company incorporated and absorbed the Iron Mountain system, and for many years thereafter "Mo-Pac" was the largest and most important railroad in the state.")

The building was used as both a passenger and freight depot.

The building was listed on the National Register of Historic Places in 1992, at which time it was vacant.

== See also ==
- National Register of Historic Places listings in Ouachita County, Arkansas

Preceding station	Missouri Pacific Railroad	Following station
Chidester toward Norman	Norman - Natchez	Tate toward Natchez
