= Hickman House (Camden, Arkansas) =

Historic house in Arkansas, United States

- U.S. National Register of Historic Places
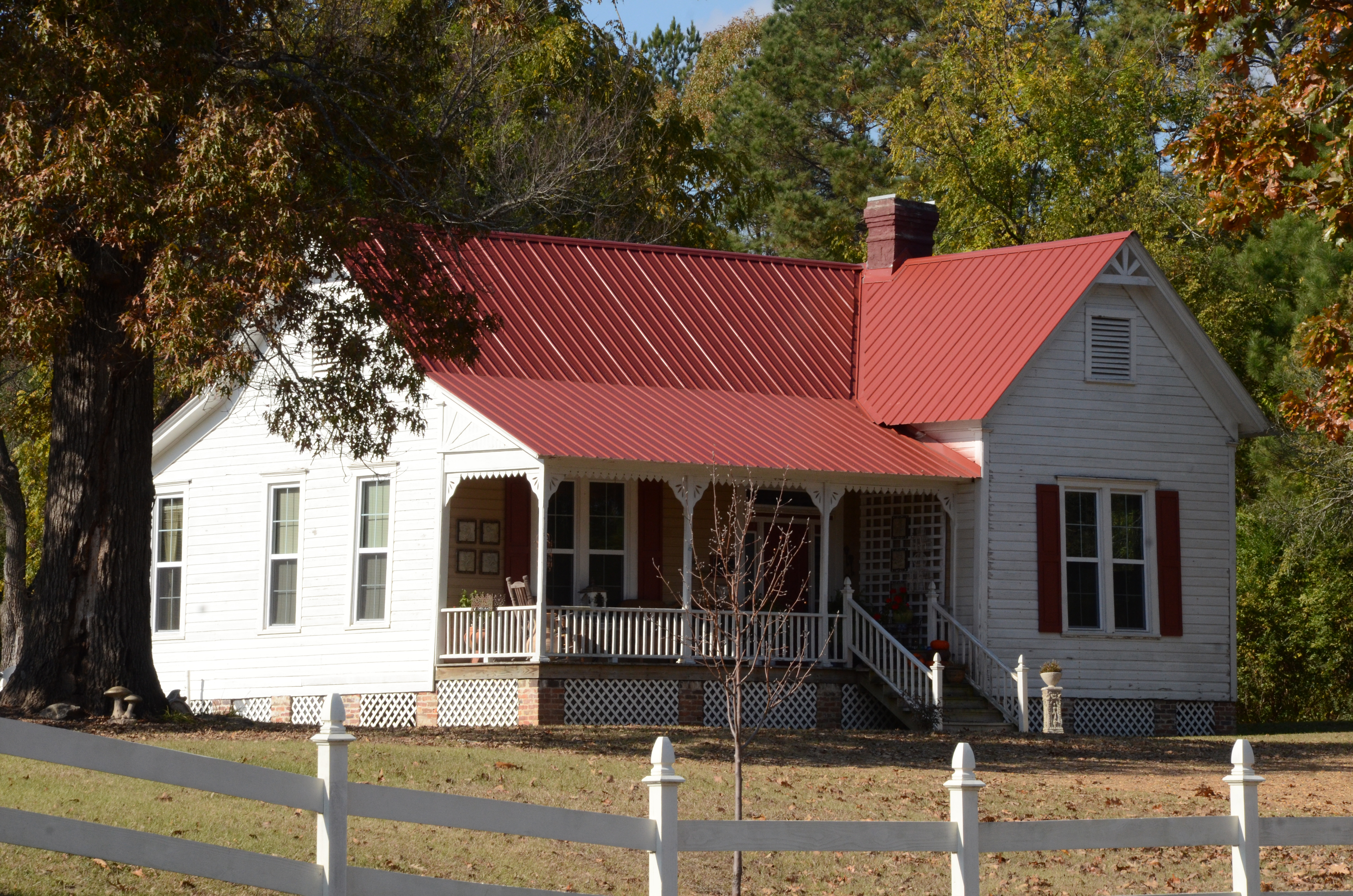

- Location within Arkansas Location within the United States
- Nearest city: Camden, Arkansas
- Coordinates: 33.5116°N 92.85308°W
- Area: 0 acres (0 ha)
- Built: 1898
- Architectural style: Late Victorian
- NRHP reference No.: 06000090
- Added to NRHP: March 2, 2006

The Hickman House is a historic house at 3568 Mt. Holly Road, in rural Ouachita County, Arkansas, south of Camden. The single story frame house was built in 1898, probably by George Edward Hickman, whose father John was one of the county's early settlers. The house is in Folk Victorian style; it has an L-shaped plan, sheathed in original weatherboard. Its principal ornamentation is in the chamfered posts of its porch, which also has sawn fretwork. The house faces east, and is set about 150 feet (46 m) back from the road; its front facade has two windows above the porch, and two that open onto it. There is a "dog-trot" style barn about 150 feet (46 m) southwest of the house.

The house was listed on the National Register of Historic Places in 2006. The house has been donated by the Hickman family to the Ouachita County Historical Society.

== See also ==
- National Register of Historic Places listings in Ouachita County, Arkansas
