= SS Homer =

- The HOMER (Shipwreck)
- U.S. National Register of Historic Places
- Location: In the Ouachita River
- Nearest city: Camden, Arkansas
- Area: 4 acres (1.6 ha)
- NRHP reference No.: 02000979
- Added to NRHP: September 14, 2002

The SS Homer was a sidewheel paddle steamer which plied the waters of the Mississippi River and its tributaries. Built in 1859 in Parkersburg, West Virginia, she was 148 feet (45 m) long, 28 feet (8.5 m) wide, and 5 feet (1.5 m) deep. Her first significant service was in 1860, when she was used as a packet steamer on the Red and Ouachita Rivers, under master and co-owner Samuel Applegate. In 1861, after the start of the American Civil War, she was contracted to the government of the Confederate States of America, and was used to transport men and war materiel. She was used to supply the defenders of Port Hudson, Louisiana, in 1864. That year she was captured by the Union Army forces of General Frederick Steele when she was about 30 miles (48 km) below Camden, Arkansas on the Ouachita River. Steele was at the time engaged in a major expedition whose goal was to reach Shreveport, Louisiana, but had stalled due to Confederate resistance and a lack of supplies. Steele had then occupied Camden, and it was during this occupation that the ship was taken, loaded with grain and other supplies. The Union forces piloted her back to Camden.

After having an attempted resupply operation thwarted by the Battle of Marks' Mills, Steele decided to abandon Camden. On April 26, 1864, Union troops left the city, abandoning or destroying equipment and supplies his draft teams were unable to haul, and scuttling all of the ships they held, including the Homer. Returning Confederate troops, observing that her cabin remained above water, were able to recover planking from the ship to fashion rafts to facilitate their crossing of the river in pursuit of Steele.

The Homer's wreck site was listed on the National Register of Historic Places in 2002. It was, at the time of its listing, the only known steamer wreck on the Ouachita, and one of a small number such wrecks in Arkansas. It had at that time been subjected only to minimal archaeological study.

== See also ==
- Camden Expedition Sites, a National Historic Landmark District encompassing some sites related to Steele's expedition
- National Register of Historic Places listings in Ouachita County, Arkansas
