= Tate's Bluff Fortification =

Historic fortification in Arkansas, United States

- U.S. National Register of Historic Places
- Nearest city: Tate's Bluff, Arkansas
- Area: less than one acre
- Built: 1864
- NRHP reference No.: 02001628
- Added to NRHP: December 31, 2002

The Tate's Bluff Fortification is a historic American Civil War fortification in northern Ouachita County, Arkansas. It is located near the confluence of the Ouachita and Little Missouri Rivers, close to County Route 25. The roughly square earthworks is believed to have been built in 1864, after Union Army forces captured Little Rock, as an effort by Confederate Army forces to fortify the Ouachita against a potential Union advance. It saw no combat, and was probably only used as an observation and supply post.

The fortification was listed on the National Register of Historic Places in 2002.

== See also ==
- National Register of Historic Places listings in Ouachita County, Arkansas
