= Old Camden Post Office =

- U.S. National Register of Historic Places
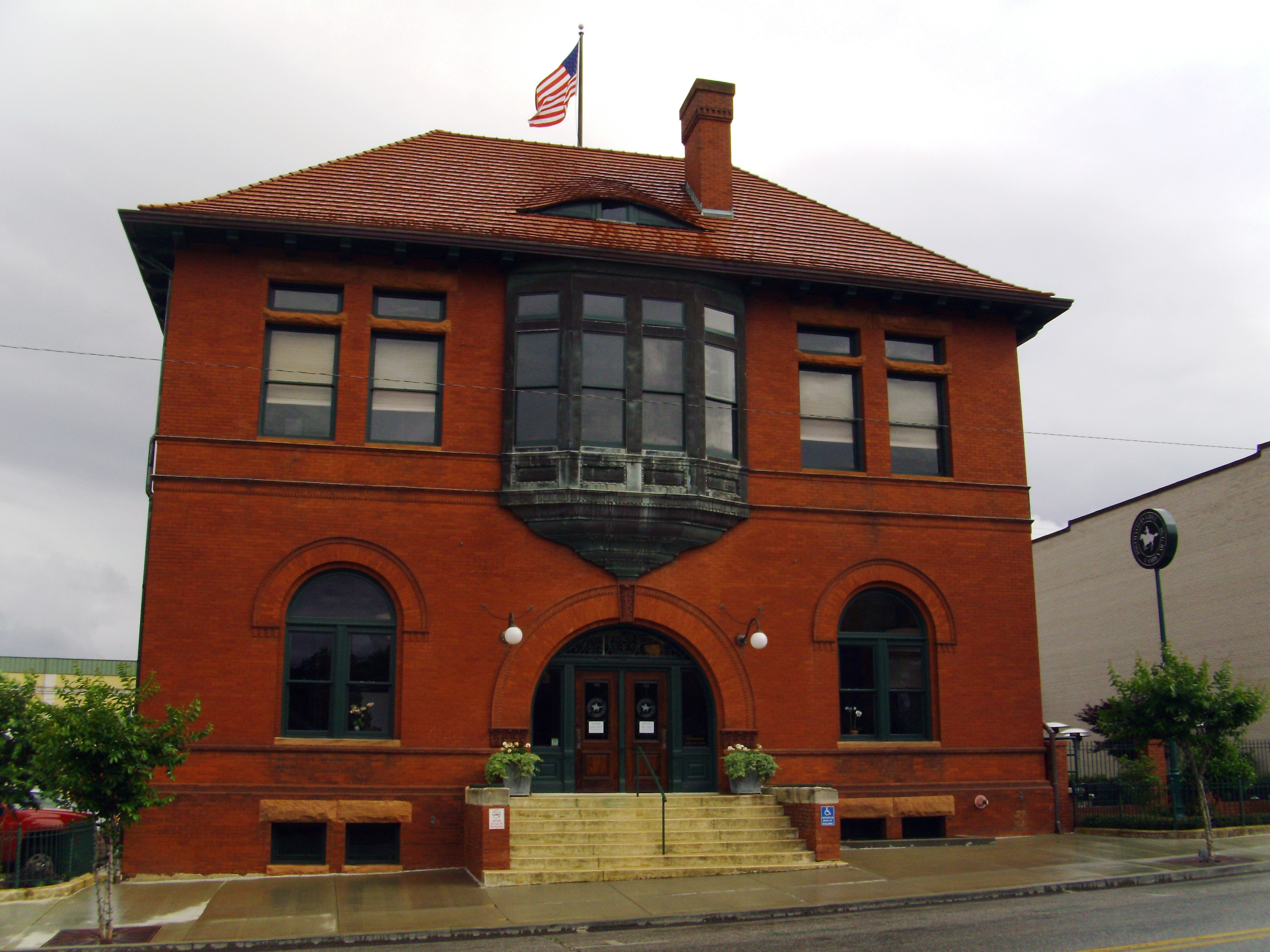
- The building in May 2014

- Location within Arkansas Location within the United States
- Location: 133 Washington St., Camden, Arkansas
- Coordinates: 33.5856°N 92.8307°W
- Area: less than one acre
- Built: 1895
- Architect: Asa Morgan
- Architectural style: Romanesque Revival
- NRHP reference No.: 77000263
- Added to NRHP: May 2, 1977

The Old Camden Post Office is a former post office building at 133 Washington Street SW in Camden, Arkansas. The two story Romanesque Revival structure was built in 1895, and is one of the city's finest brick buildings. It was described, shortly after its construction, as the "finest building between Little Rock and Texarkana". It originally housed the post office on the ground floor and the Federal Land Office on the second floor.

The building was listed on the National Register of Historic Places in 1977.

== See also ==
- National Register of Historic Places listings in Ouachita County, Arkansas
- List of United States post offices
