= Two Bayou Methodist Church and Cemetery =

Historic site in Ouachita County, Arkansas, US

- U.S. National Register of Historic Places
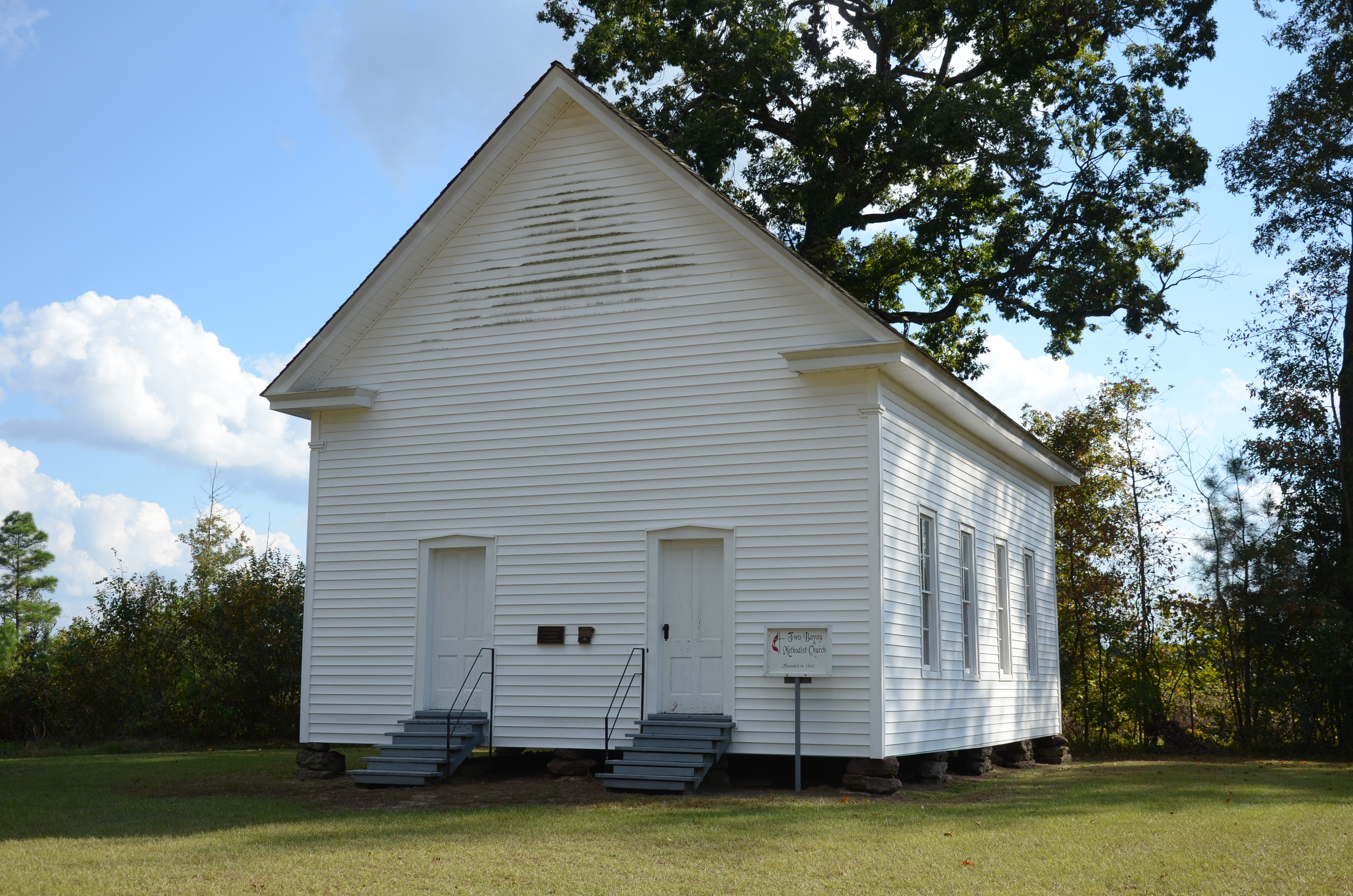

- Location within Arkansas Location within the United States
- Nearest city: Camden, Arkansas
- Coordinates: 33°32′42″N 92°57′44″W
- Area: 8 acres (3.2 ha)
- Built: 1875
- Built by: Mendenhall, J.T.
- Architectural style: Greek Revival
- NRHP reference No.: 98000830
- Added to NRHP: July 9, 1998

Two Bayou Methodist Church and Cemetery are a historic church and cemetery in rural Ouachita County, Arkansas, near the county seat of Camden. The vernacular single-story wood-frame church was built in 1875 by J. T. Mendenhall. It is located at the southern end of Ouachita County Road 125, off US Route 278 west of Camden. The cemetery, which lies just south of the church, was predominantly populated between 1850 (the date of its oldest marker) and 1948. The building is little-altered since its construction, and was used regularly for services between its construction and the 1940s.

The property was listed on the National Register of Historic Places in 1998.

== See also ==
- National Register of Historic Places listings in Ouachita County, Arkansas
