= Lester and Haltom No. 1 Well Site =

- U.S. National Register of Historic Places
- Location within Arkansas Location within the United States
- Nearest city: Stephens, Arkansas
- Coordinates: 33°25′43″N 93°0′45″W
- Area: less than one acre
- NRHP reference No.: 76000442
- Added to NRHP: April 3, 1976

The Lester and Haltom No. 1 Well Site is the site of the first discovery of oil in the state of Arkansas in 1920. It is located in Ouachita County, about four miles (6.4 km) east of Stephens, and off Old Wire Road (County Road 3). The site is overgrown, with limited evidence of its past. There are (or were, in 1976), two large depressions in the ground, about 2 1/2 to 3 feet (0.76 to 0.91 m) deep, and up to 75 feet (23 m) long and 35 feet (11 m) wide, one used as a mud pit, the other as a slush pit. A tar-blackened trail shows where there was runoff from the well, whose drill hole was just to the south of the mud pit. East of the mud pit is another depression where the steam engine was mounted; there is still a turnbuckle embedded in a nearby tree.

The well on this site blew on April 14, 1920, was operated for only a short time, producing 70 to 100 barrels per day for a few months before running dry, and was not commercially viable. The site was listed on the National Register of Historic Places in 1976.

== See also ==
- National Register of Historic Places listings in Ouachita County, Arkansas
