= Rowland B. Smith House =

Historic house in Arkansas, United States

- U.S. National Register of Historic Places
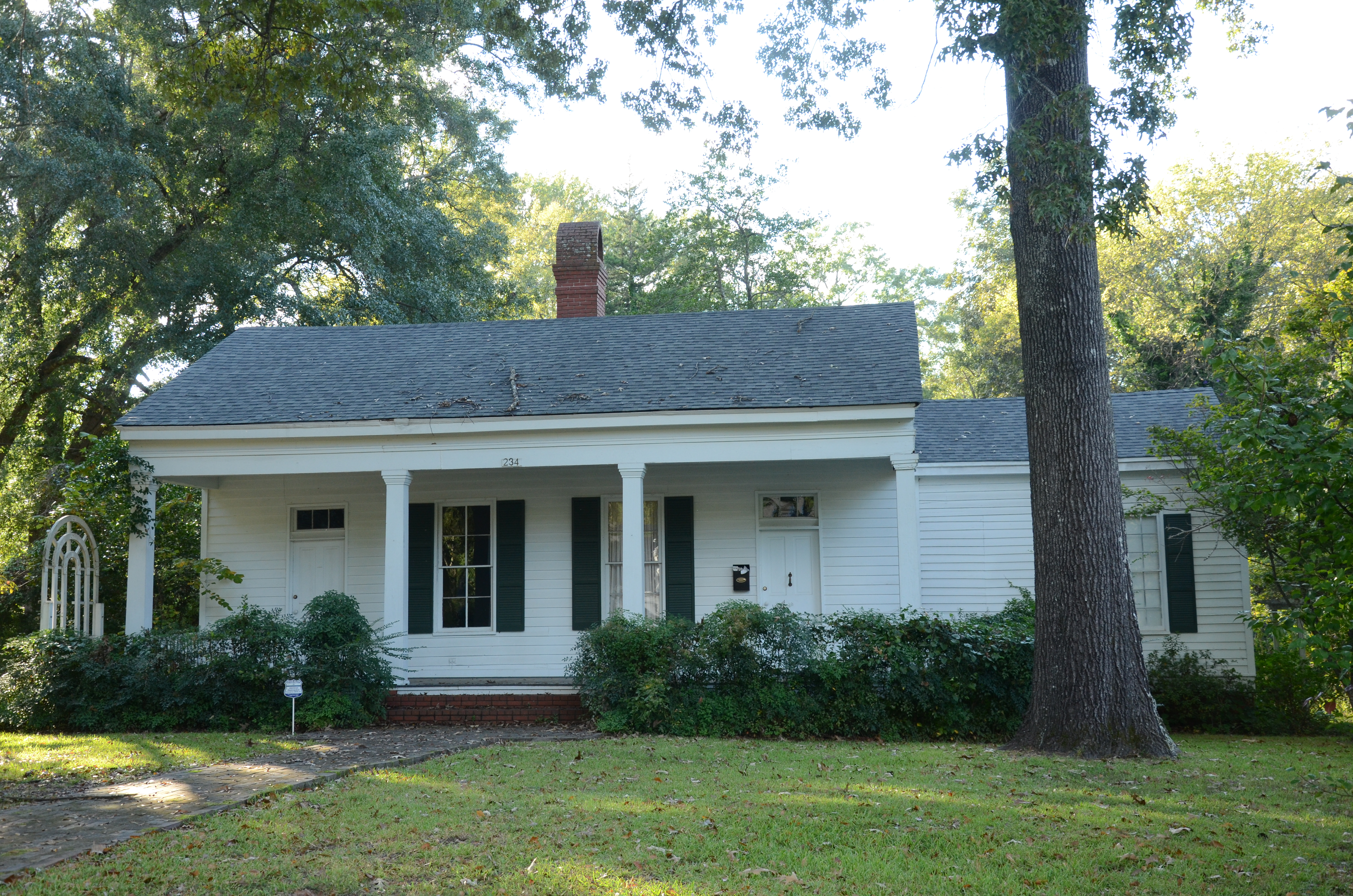

- Location within Arkansas Location within the United States
- Location: 234 Agee St., Camden, Arkansas
- Coordinates: 33°34′54″N 92°50′38″W
- Area: less than one acre
- Built: 1856
- NRHP reference No.: 74000486
- Added to NRHP: January 21, 1974

The Rowland B. Smith House is a historic house at 234 Agee Street in Camden, Arkansas. This single-story wood-frame house was supposedly built in 1856, and exhibits no distinctive architectural style. The house is L-shaped, with a four-bay facade. A porch runs across the front under the main roof, which is supported by square columns. The house was probably built as a "in-town" house for the owner of a cotton plantation.

The house was listed on the National Register of Historic Places in 1974.

== See also ==
- National Register of Historic Places listings in Ouachita County, Arkansas
