= Richmond-Tufts House =

Historic house in Arkansas, United States

- U.S. National Register of Historic Places
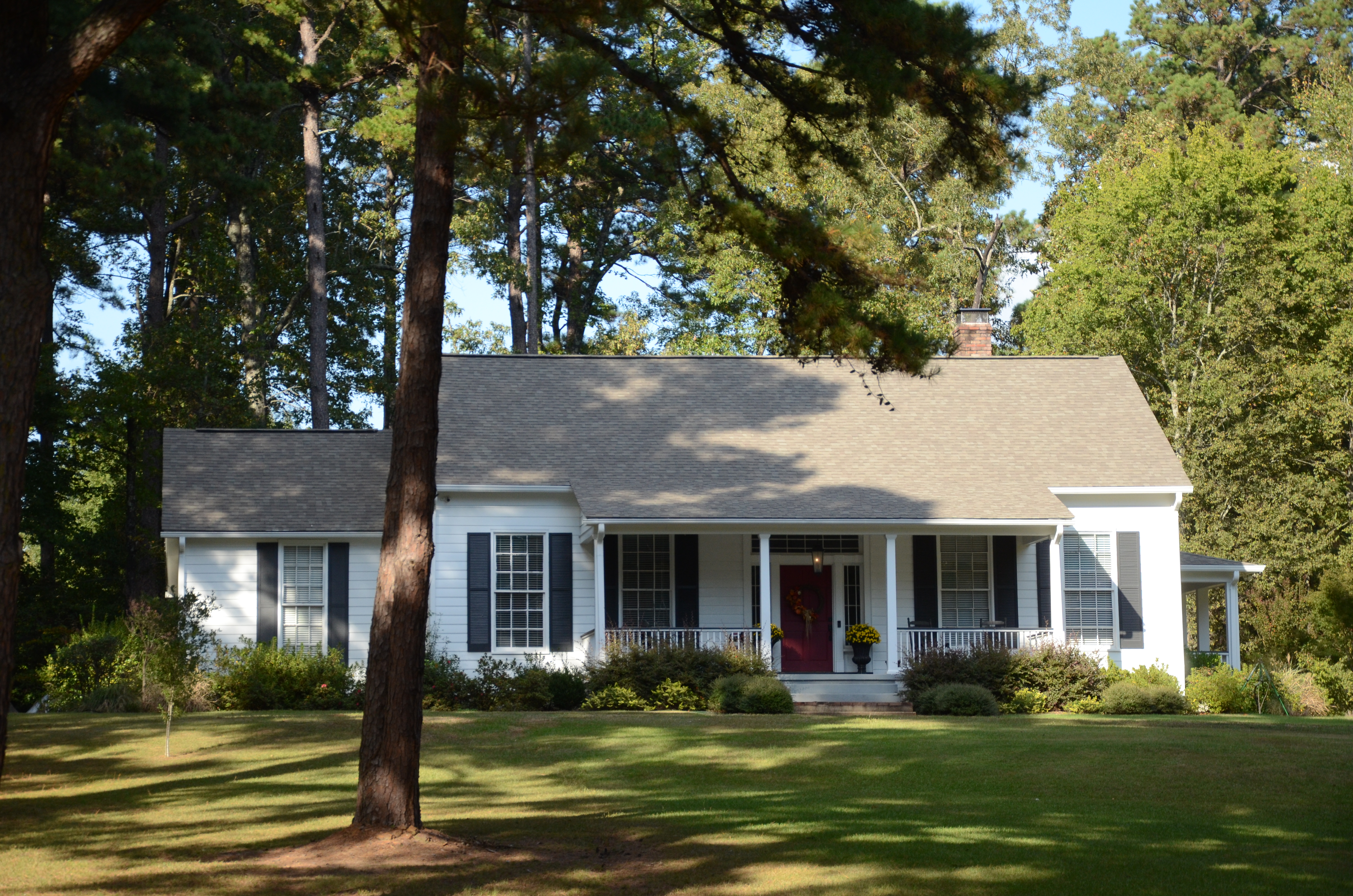

- Location within Arkansas Location within the United States
- Nearest city: Camden, Arkansas
- Coordinates: 33°36′25″N 92°54′31″W
- Area: less than one acre
- Built: 1853
- Built by: N.W. Richmond
- NRHP reference No.: 77000264
- Added to NRHP: December 2, 1977

The Richmond-Tufts House is a historic house in rural Ouachita County, Arkansas, outside the county seat of Camden. This single-story wood-frame house was built in 1853, and was originally located on West Washington Street in Camden, before being moved to its present location c. 1961. When first built, the house had Greek Revival styling, but it was extensively renovated and extended after its purchase in 1883 by Alfred Tufts, who moved from the northern United States to Camden after the American Civil War, married a local woman, and acquired a great deal of land. He made numerous Late Victorian additions to the house, most of which were undone when the house was moved, restoring its original Greek Revival character. The house is five bays wide, with a side gable roof, and a four-column porch that extends across a portion of the front.

The house was listed on the National Register of Historic Places in 1977.

== See also ==
- National Register of Historic Places listings in Ouachita County, Arkansas
