= Oakland Farm =

Historic house in Arkansas, United States

- U.S. National Register of Historic Places
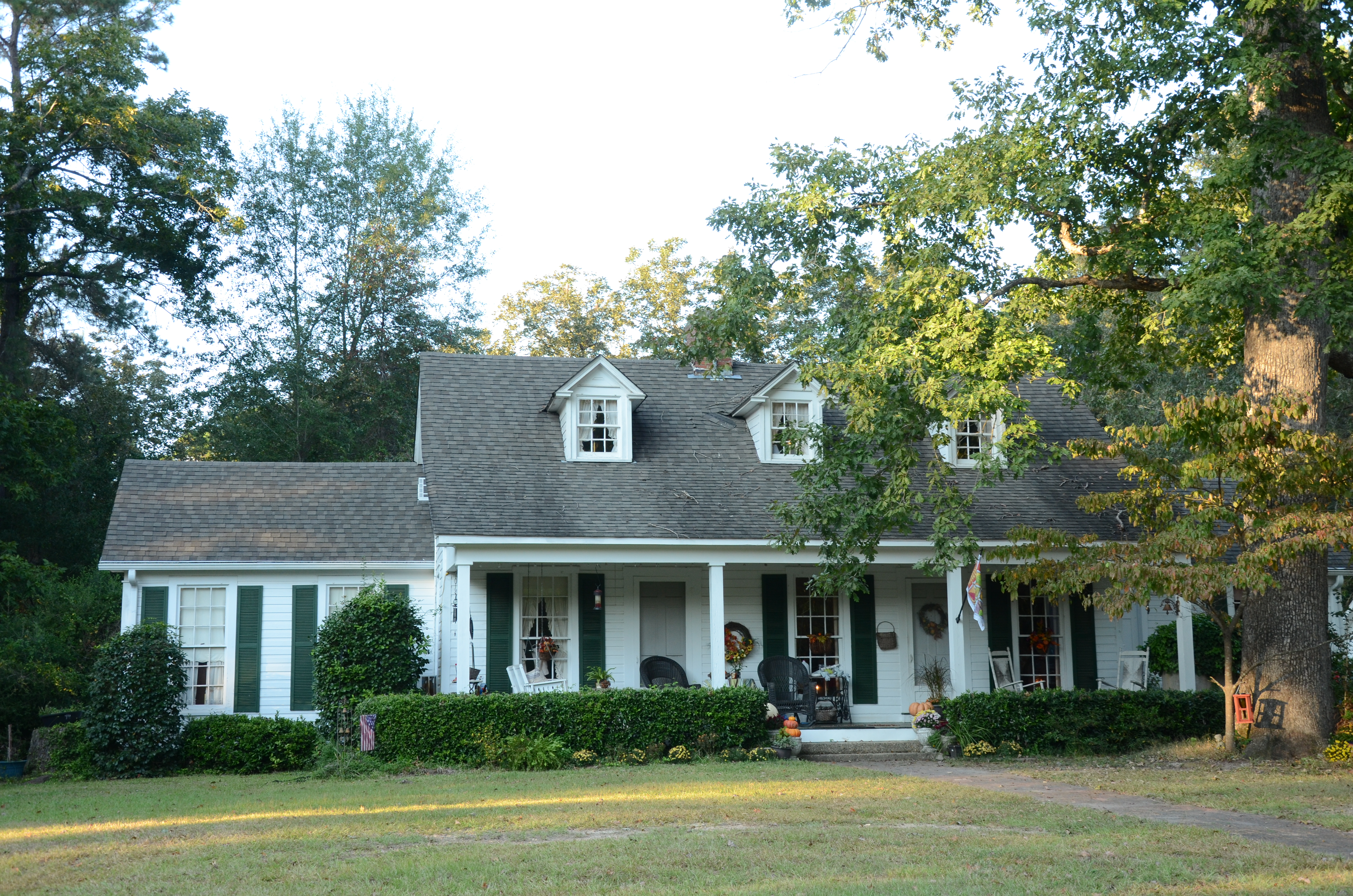

- Location within Arkansas Location within the United States
- Nearest city: Camden, Arkansas
- Coordinates: 33°32′32″N 92°50′50″W
- Area: less than one acre
- Built: 1886
- NRHP reference No.: 78003062
- Added to NRHP: March 24, 1978

Oakland Farm is a historic farmhouse at the northern end of Oakland Street in Camden, Arkansas. The 1 1/2-story cypress house was built in 1886, and stands on one of the largest (96-acre (39 ha)) and most prominent estates in Camden. The house was built by William Frank Tate, descendant of Ouachita County's first English settler, John Tate, and remains in the Tate family. It has a T shape, with a main block and a series of additions which give it that shape. A veranda supported by Doric columns spans the width of the main facade.

The house, and a small parcel of land surrounding it, was listed on the National Register of Historic Places in 1978. The larger farm property also includes the listed Tate's Barn.

== See also ==
- National Register of Historic Places listings in Ouachita County, Arkansas
