= Benjamin T. Powell House =

Historic house in Arkansas, United States

- U.S. National Register of Historic Places
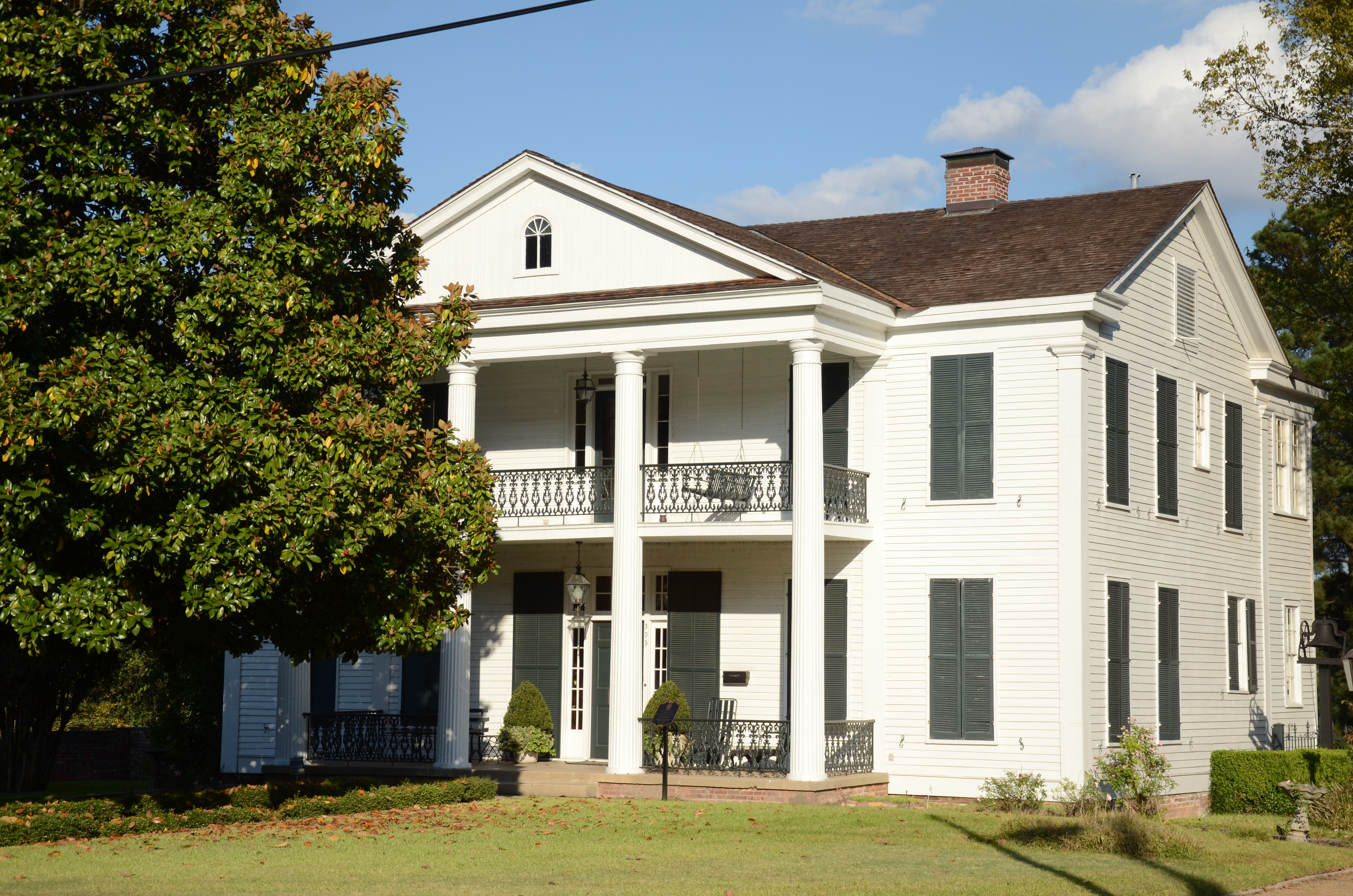

- Location within Arkansas Location within the United States
- Location: 305 California Ave., Camden, Arkansas
- Coordinates: 33°34′52″N 92°49′59″W
- Area: less than one acre
- Built: 1859
- Architectural style: Classical Revival
- NRHP reference No.: 74000485
- Added to NRHP: January 21, 1974

The Benjamin T. Powell House is a historic house at 305 California Avenue in Camden, Arkansas. The two story wood-frame house was built in 1859, and is one a few pre-Civil War cotton-magnate houses to survive in the city. The house has a cypress frame, and features a Classical Revival facade with a front gable supported by four round columns sheltering porches with ornamental iron railings. The house was used as a military headquarters by Union Army forces during the Civil War.

The house was listed on the National Register of Historic Places in 1974.

== See also ==
- National Register of Historic Places listings in Ouachita County, Arkansas
