= Bragg House (Camden, Arkansas) =

Historic house in Arkansas, United States

- U.S. National Register of Historic Places
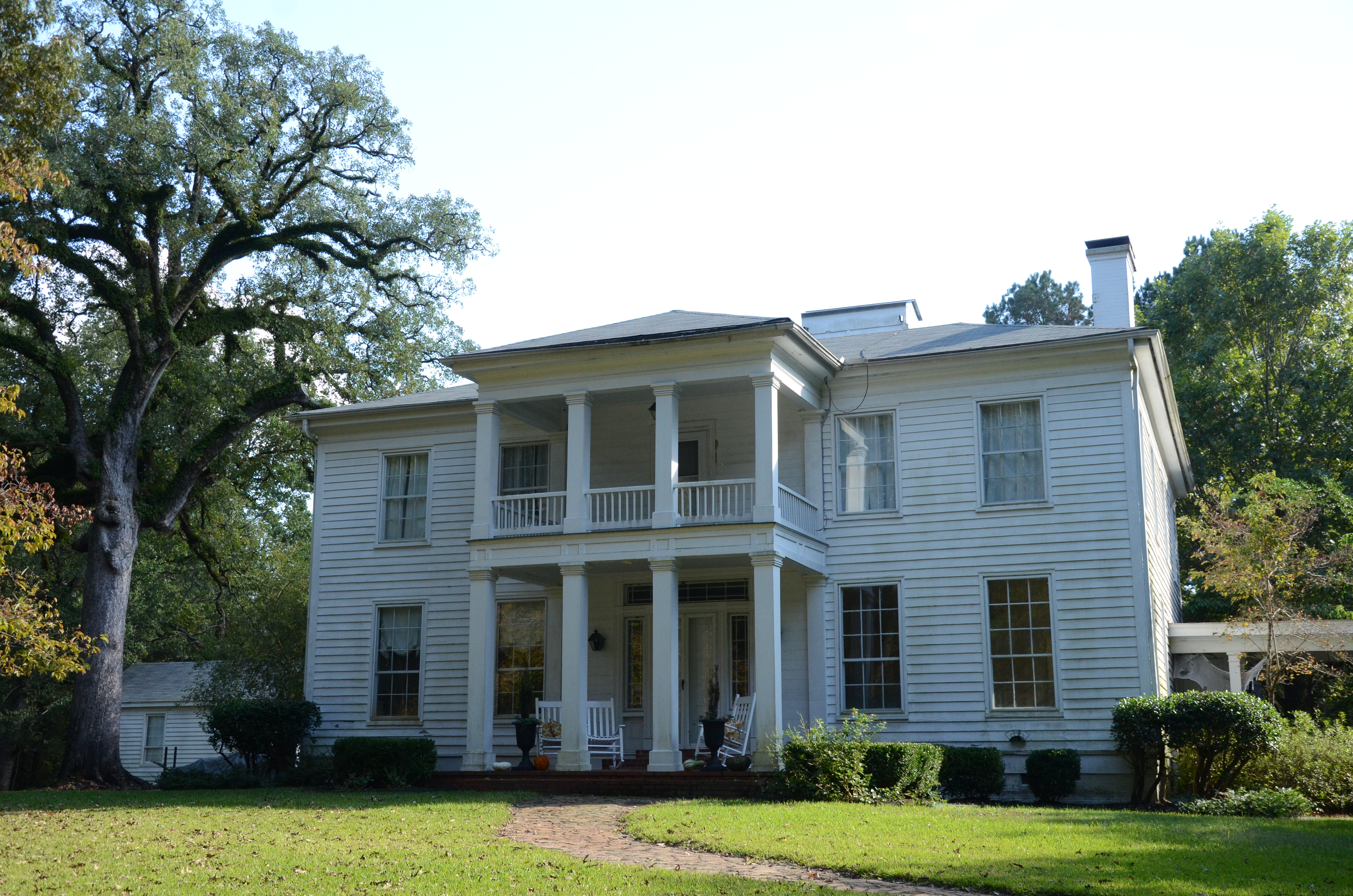

- Location within Arkansas Location within the United States
- Nearest city: Camden, Arkansas
- Coordinates: 33°34′52″N 92°53′56″W
- Built: 1850
- Architect: Peter Newport Bragg
- NRHP reference No.: 74000487
- Added to NRHP: March 1, 1974

The Bragg House is a historic house in rural Ouachita County, Arkansas. It is a two-story Greek Revival house located about 4 miles (6.4 km) west of Camden, the county seat, on United States Route 278 (formerly designated Arkansas Highway 4). The house is basically rectangular in plan, with a hip roof. Its main entrance is sheltered by a two-story temple-style portico, with four columns topped with Doric capitals, and a turned-baluster railing on the second floor. Peter Newport Bragg began construction of the house in 1842, but did not complete it until 1850. The house was built out of virgin lumber sawn on Bragg's sawmill by his slaves; it remains in the hands of Bragg's descendants.

The house was listed on the National Register of Historic Places in 1974.

== See also ==
- National Register of Historic Places listings in Ouachita County, Arkansas
