= Bearden Waterworks =

- U.S. National Register of Historic Places
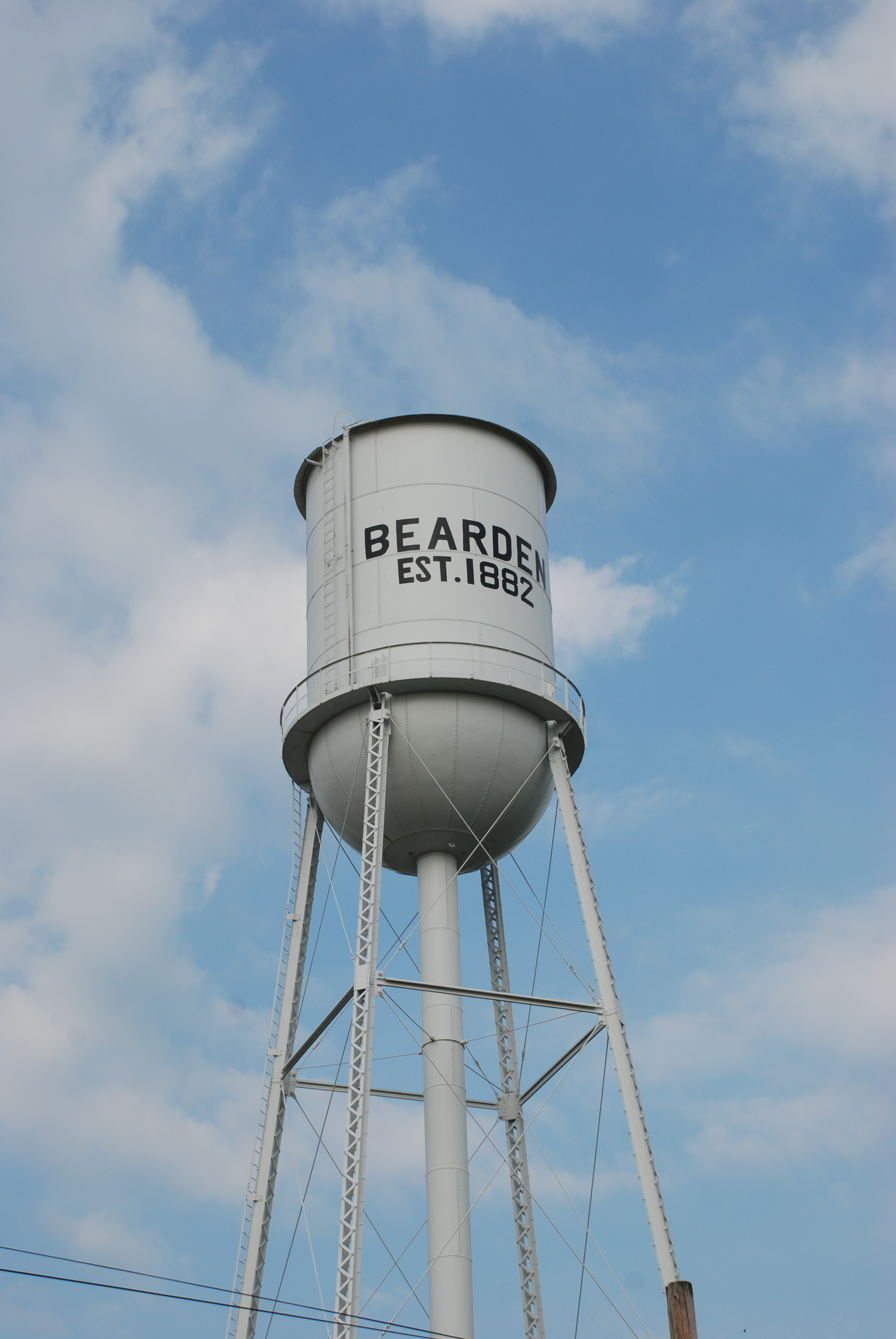

- Location within Arkansas Location within the United States
- Location: Jct. of N. 2nd and N. Cedar, Bearden, Arkansas
- Coordinates: 33°43′39″N 92°37′1″W
- Area: less than one acre
- Built: 1936
- Built by: McEachin & McEachin, Inc.
- Engineer: W.F. Moody & Co.
- MPS: New Deal Recovery Efforts in Arkansas MPS
- NRHP reference No.: 06000908
- Added to NRHP: October 5, 2006

The Bearden Water Works are a historic public water works facility in Bearden, Arkansas, United States. It is located behind Bearden's city hall, at the corner of North 2nd Street and North Cedar Street, and consists of a water tower, two well houses, and a concrete holding tank. The facility was funded in 1936 by the Public Works Administration (PWA), and is the only PWA-built water works left in the county.

The water works was listed on the National Register of Historic Places in 2006.

== See also ==
- National Register of Historic Places listings in Ouachita County, Arkansas
