= Holt–Poindexter Store Building =

- U.S. National Register of Historic Places
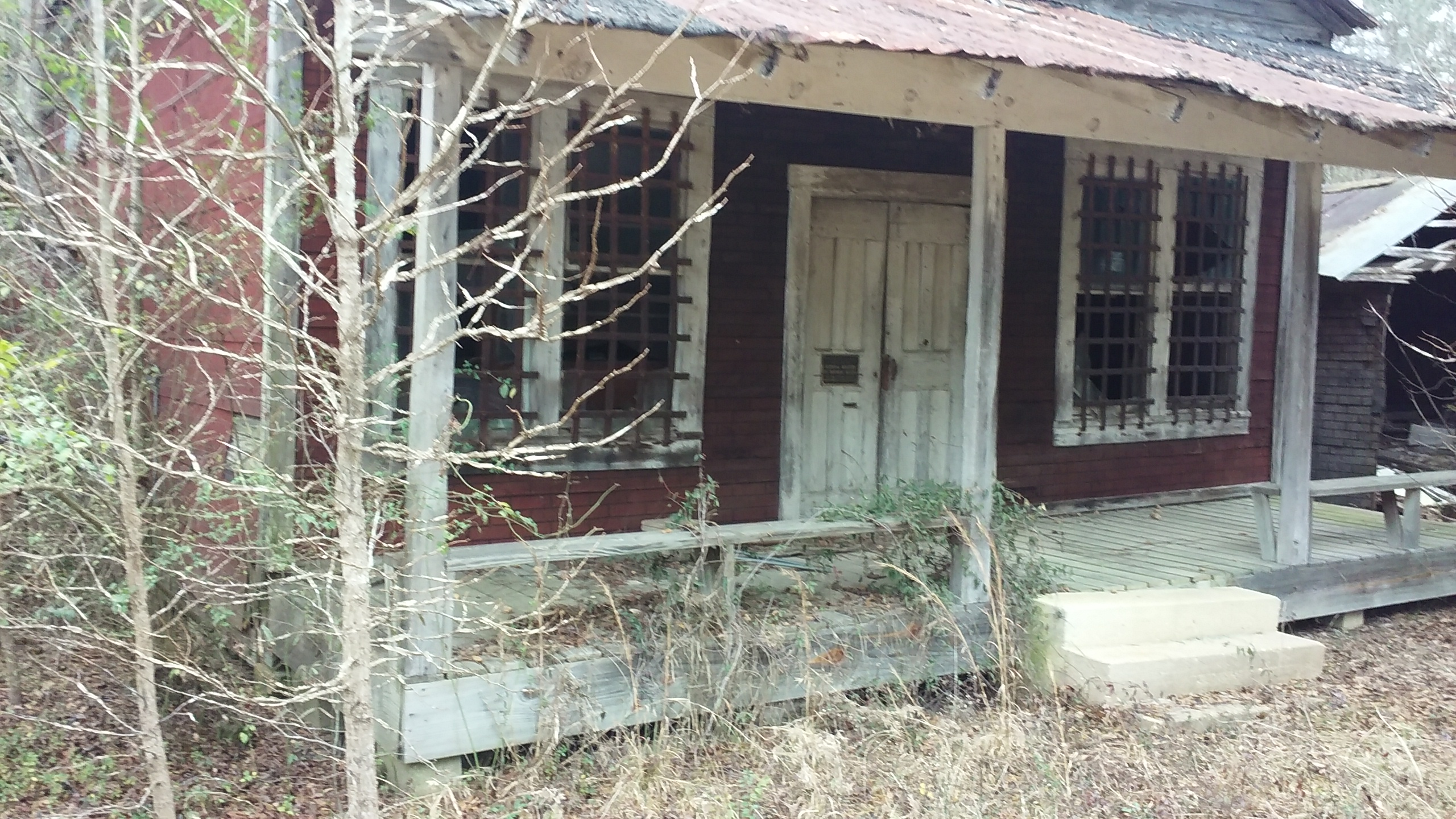

- Location within Arkansas Location within the United States
- Nearest city: Stephens, Arkansas
- Coordinates: 33°27′8″N 93°1′24″W
- Area: less than one acre
- Built: 1904
- Built by: Curtis Smith
- NRHP reference No.: 86002948
- Added to NRHP: October 23, 1986

The Holt–Poindexter Store Building is a historic retail building in rural Ouachita County, Arkansas. It is located on County Road 101, near its southern junction with County Road 111, about four miles (6.4 km) north of Stephens, in the unincorporated community of Ogemaw. The store, a vernacular single-story wood-frame structure with a gable roof and full-width front porch, was built in 1904 by Curtis Smith, a local carpenter, for H. B. Holt, and is believed to be the oldest general store in southern Arkansas. A small addition was added to the north side in the 1920s to house post office facilities. This was removed in 1948, at which time a rear addition was added to provide space for an office and feed storage. The business was taken over by Holt's son-in-law, Chester Poindexter, and then his son, Kenneth.

The building was listed on the National Register of Historic Places in 1986.

== See also ==
- National Register of Historic Places listings in Ouachita County, Arkansas
