= Rumph House =

Historic house in Arkansas, United States

- U.S. National Register of Historic Places
- U.S. Historic district – Contributing property
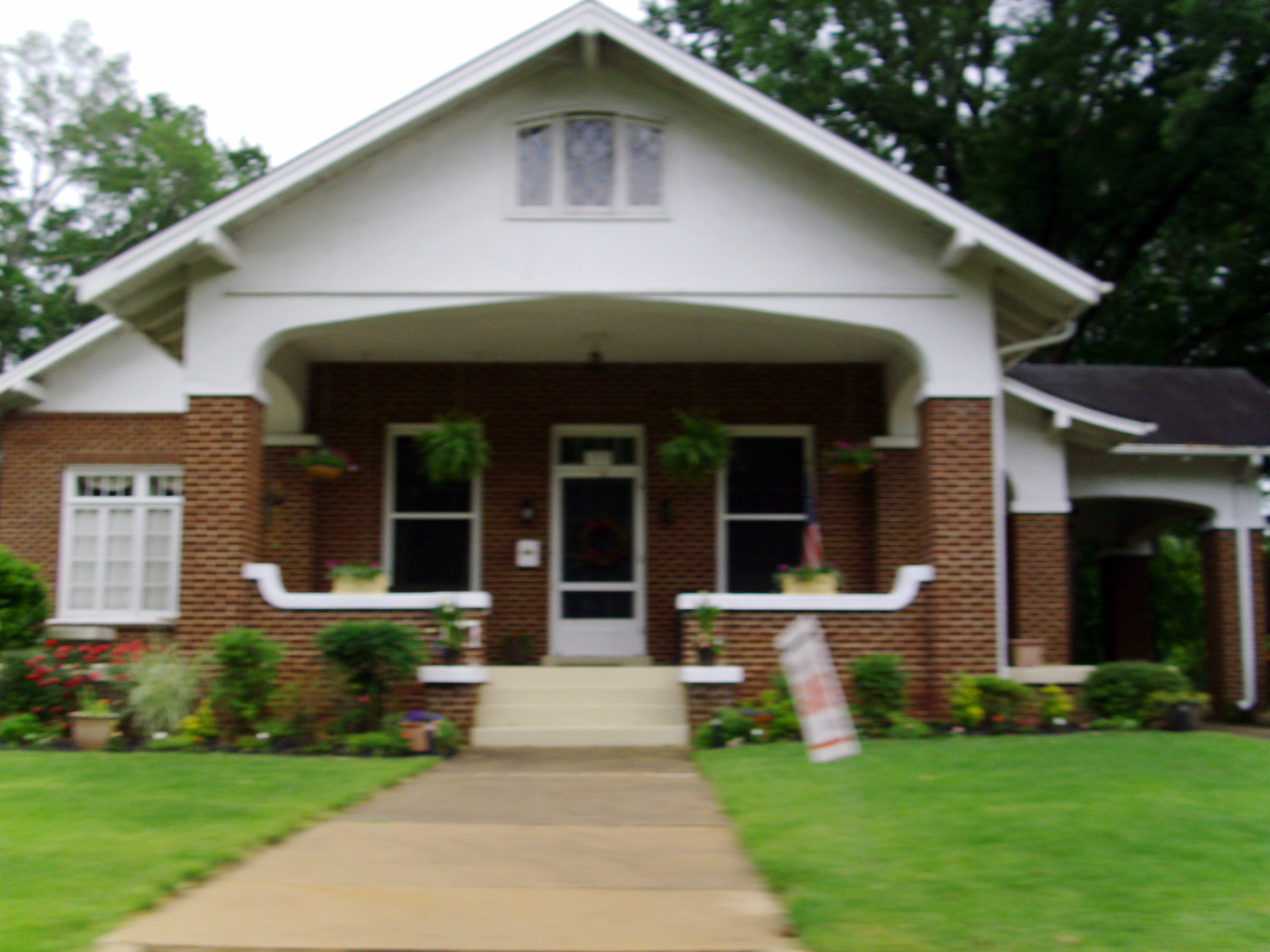

- Location within Arkansas Location within the United States
- Location: 717 Washington St., Camden, Arkansas
- Coordinates: 33°35′3″N 92°50′25″W
- Area: 4 acres (1.6 ha)
- Built: 1925
- Architectural style: Bungalow/craftsman
- Part of: Washington Street Historic District (ID09001256)
- NRHP reference No.: 03000948

Significant dates
- Added to NRHP: September 25, 2003
- Designated CP: January 22, 2010

The Rumph House is a historic house at 717 Washington Street in Camden, Arkansas. In 1874 a single-story Victorian house was built, in which Dr. Junius Bragg, a Confederate Army surgeon, lived for many years. This house was extensively remodeled in 1925, during Arkansas' oil boom, adding a second floor, and restyling the building in the then-popular Craftsman style. This renovation was undertaken by Garland S. Rumph, who was prominent in local politics. Its Craftsman features include wide eaves, stuccoed gable ends, and exposed false rafter beams.

The house was listed on the National Register of Historic Places in 2003.

The home was purchased in 2008 by Thomas Holt who has continued to contribute to the history of the home. Improvements have been made to the original structure in 2014 by closing in the back porch adding a sunroom and the addition of a deck in the back of the home.

== See also ==
- National Register of Historic Places listings in Ouachita County, Arkansas
