= McCollum-Chidester House =

Historic house in Arkansas, United States

- U.S. National Register of Historic Places
- U.S. Historic district – Contributing property
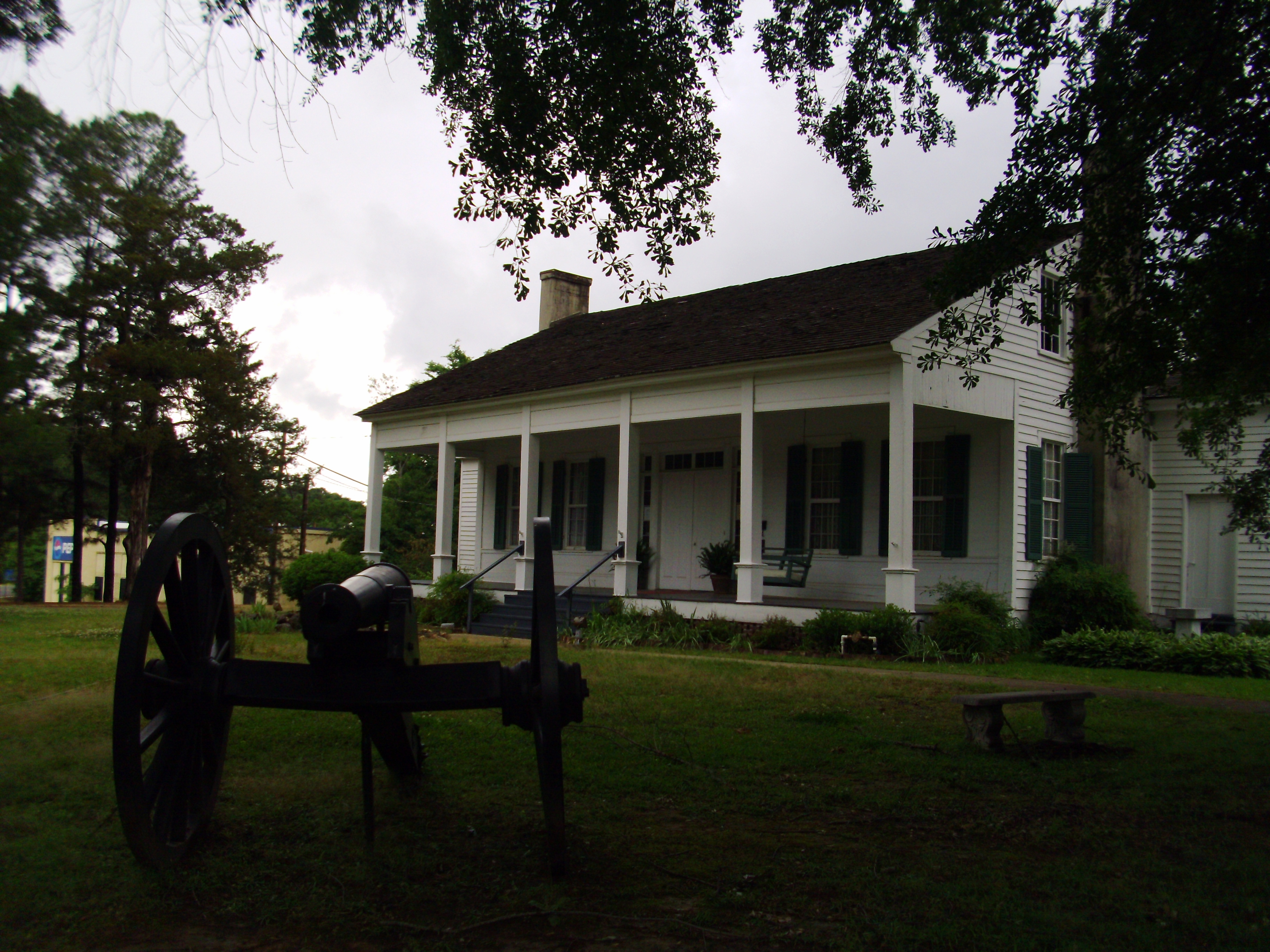
- McCollum-Chidester House, 2014

- Location within Arkansas Location within the United States
- Location: 926 Washington St., NW, Camden, Arkansas
- Coordinates: 33°35′5″N 92°50′32″W
- Area: less than one acre
- Built: 1847; 179 years ago
- Architectural style: Greek Revival
- Part of: Washington Street Historic District (ID09001256)
- NRHP reference No.: 71000127

Significant dates
- Added to NRHP: June 24, 1971
- Designated CP: January 22, 2010

The McCollum-Chidester House is a historic house at 926 Washington Street NW in Camden, Arkansas. It is now a museum operated by the Ouachita County Historical Society, along with the Leake-Ingham Building at the rear of the property. The 1 1/2-story wood-frame house was built in 1847 by Peter McCollum and sold ten years later to Colonel John T. Chidester. It is one of the finest pre-Civil War Greek Revival mansions in the state. Chidester was a prominent businessman who controversially sought to do business with Union interests during the Civil War. After the war he established a mail company that operated so-called "Star routes" as far west as the Arizona Territory. He was not implicated in bribery scandals that attended this operation.

The house was listed on the National Register of Historic Places in 1971.

== See also ==
- National Register of Historic Places listings in Ouachita County, Arkansas
