= Tate's Barn =

- U.S. National Register of Historic Places
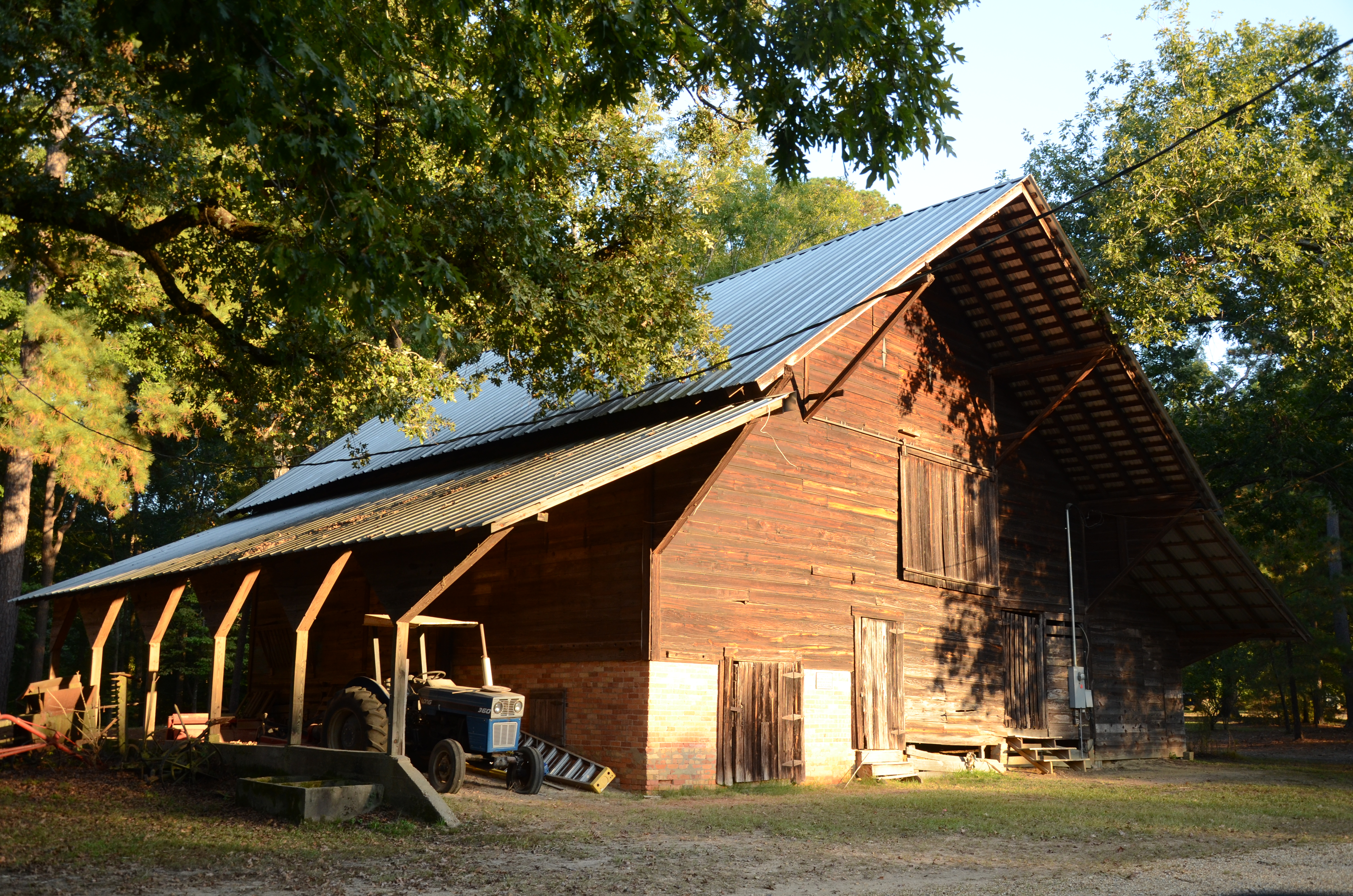

- Location within Arkansas Location within the United States
- Location: Oakland Farm, Oakland Street, Camden, Arkansas
- Coordinates: 33°32′30″N 92°50′41″W
- Area: 0 acres (0 ha)
- Built: 1880
- NRHP reference No.: 72000207
- Added to NRHP: November 9, 1972

Tate's Barn is an historic barn in Camden, Arkansas. It is located on the Oakland Farm, a 96-acre (39 ha) property off Oakland Street, belonging to the Tate family, who were among Ouachita County's first American settlers. The barn, probably built in the 1880s, is a cypress structure with a complex floor plan spanning five levels. It is 37 feet (11 m) wide and 50 feet (15 m) long, with a potato cellar, corn storage rooms, equipment storage, and two levels of hay loft. Two sheds are attached to the barn, one housing horse stalls, the other farm implements.

The barn was listed on the National Register of Historic Places in 1972.

== See also ==
- National Register of Historic Places listings in Ouachita County, Arkansas
