= Tyson Family Commercial Building =

- U.S. National Register of Historic Places
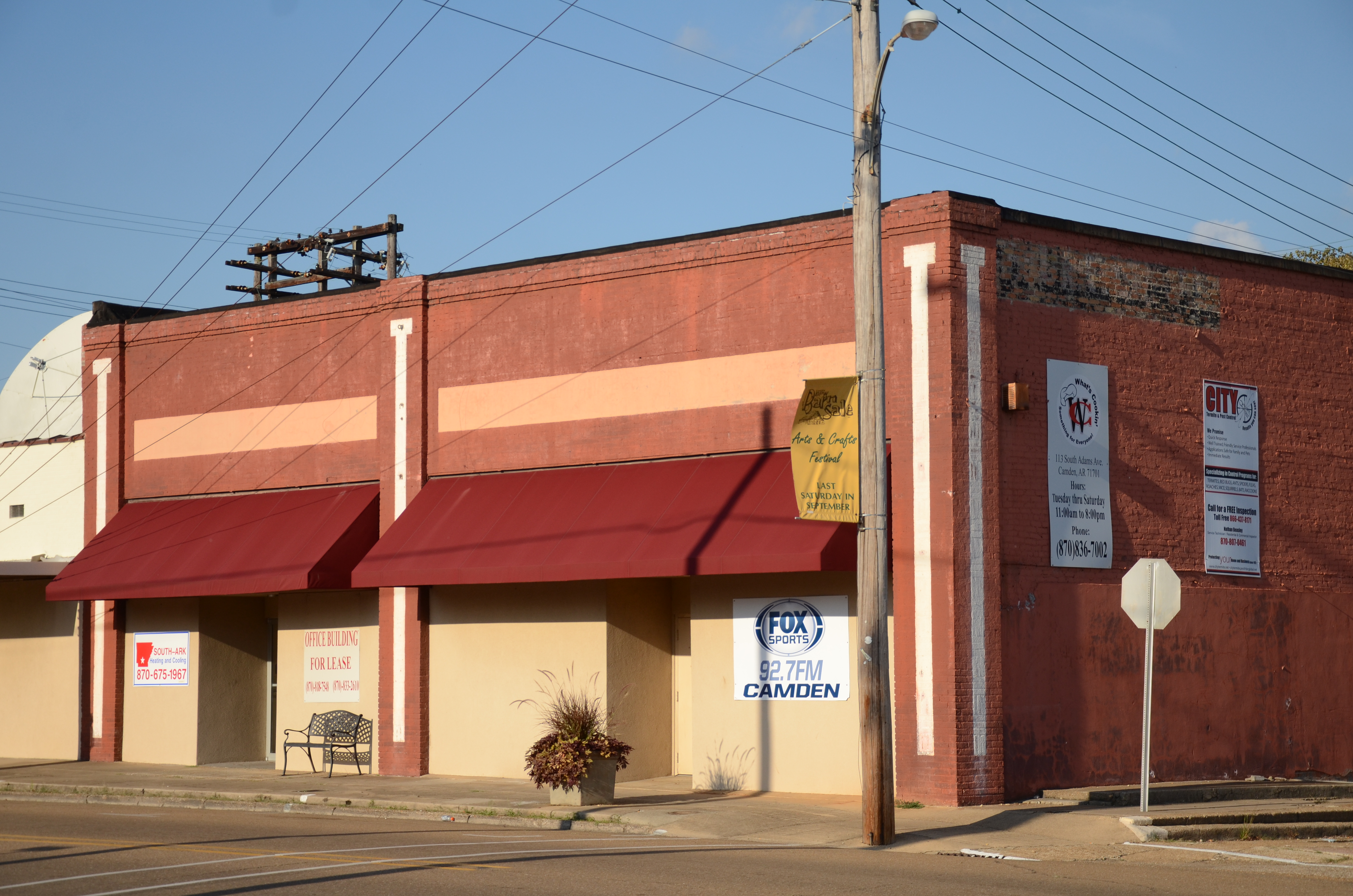

- Location within Arkansas Location within the United States
- Location: 151 Adams St., SE., Camden, Arkansas
- Coordinates: 33°35′4″N 92°49′45″W
- Area: less than one acre
- Built: 1923
- Architectural style: Late 19th And Early 20th Century American Movements
- NRHP reference No.: 94001339
- Added to NRHP: November 21, 1994

The Tyson Family Commercial Building is a historic commercial building at 151 Adams Street SE in Camden, Arkansas. Built c. 1923, this vernacular 1 1/2 story brick commercial block is one of the few to survive in the city from this time. Its main facade consists of three brick pilasters separated by plate glass windows supported by a metal frame. These are topped by a series of smaller transom windows. The two sections of the front are unequal in size, and one is slightly angled from the other. Although a number of similar buildings were built in the 1920s, most were destroyed by fire in the 1960s. It has always housed a general store.

The building was listed on the National Register of Historic Places in 1994.

== See also ==
- National Register of Historic Places listings in Ouachita County, Arkansas
