= Green Cemetery =

Historic cemetery in Ouachita County, Arkansas, US

- U.S. National Register of Historic Places
- Location within Arkansas Location within the United States
- Location: West of County Road 1, northwest of Stephens, Arkansas
- Coordinates: 33°25′56″N 93°5′55″W
- Area: less than one acre
- Built: 1855
- NRHP reference No.: 16000653
- Added to NRHP: May 5, 2017

The Green Cemetery is a historic family cemetery in rural southwestern Ouachita County, Arkansas. It is on the west side of County Road 1, about 2 miles (3.2 km) northwest of Stephens. It is a small and somewhat overgrown plot, containing eighteen marked graves, all for members of the extended Green (or Greene) family, who were early settlers to the area. The oldest marked grave is dated 1853, and the last is dated 1909. The stone markers include works by James Reynolds and John Stroud, both of New Orleans.

The cemetery was listed on the National Register of Historic Places in 2000.

== See also ==
- National Register of Historic Places listings in Ouachita County, Arkansas
