= Capt. John T. Burkett House =

Historic house in Arkansas, United States

- U.S. National Register of Historic Places
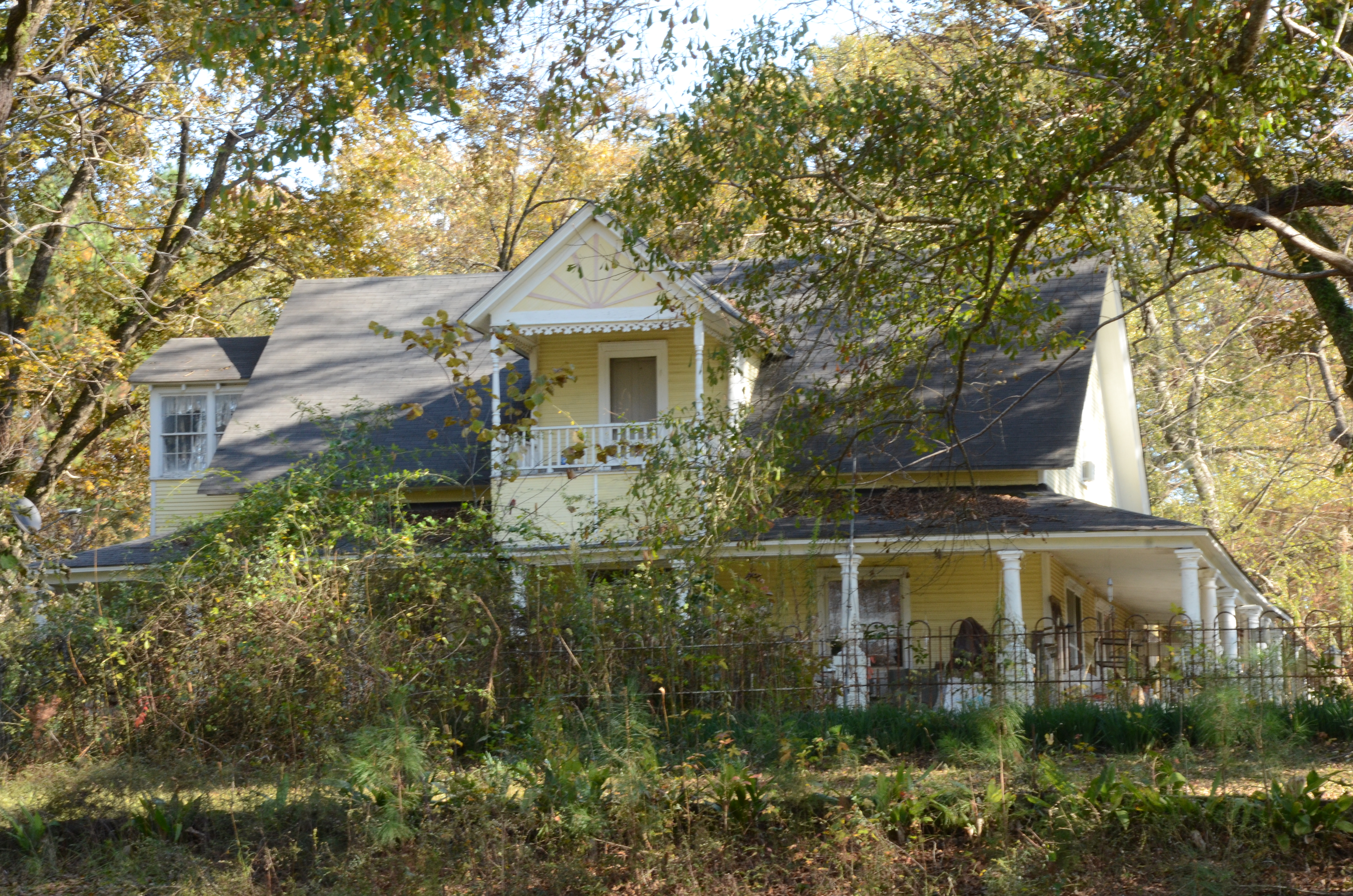

- Location within Arkansas Location within the United States
- Nearest city: Frenchport, Arkansas
- Coordinates: 33°26′27″N 92°47′39″W
- Area: 2 acres (0.81 ha)
- Built: 1899
- Architect: Harkey, William George
- NRHP reference No.: 98000620
- Added to NRHP: June 3, 1998

The Capt. John T. Burkett House is a historic house in rural Ouachita County, Arkansas. It is located at 607 Ouachita County Road 65, near the community of Frenchport. The 1 1/2-story wood-frame house was built c. 1899 by John Burkett, a ship's captain and part-owner of a local lumber mill. He later served as the chief warden at Cummins Prison, and then as a regional agent of the Internal Revenue Service. The house is a fine example of Folk Victorian style. Its front facade has a porch running across its whole width, mounted on piers made of locally manufactured bricks, with its hip-roof supported by concrete columns that resemble Tuscan-style columns. The balustrade is a metal filigree work. A gable-roof balcony projects above the center of the porch.

The house was listed on the National Register of Historic Places in 1998.

== See also ==
- National Register of Historic Places listings in Ouachita County, Arkansas
