= Clifton and Greening Streets Historic District =

Historic district in Arkansas, United States

- U.S. National Register of Historic Places
- U.S. Historic district
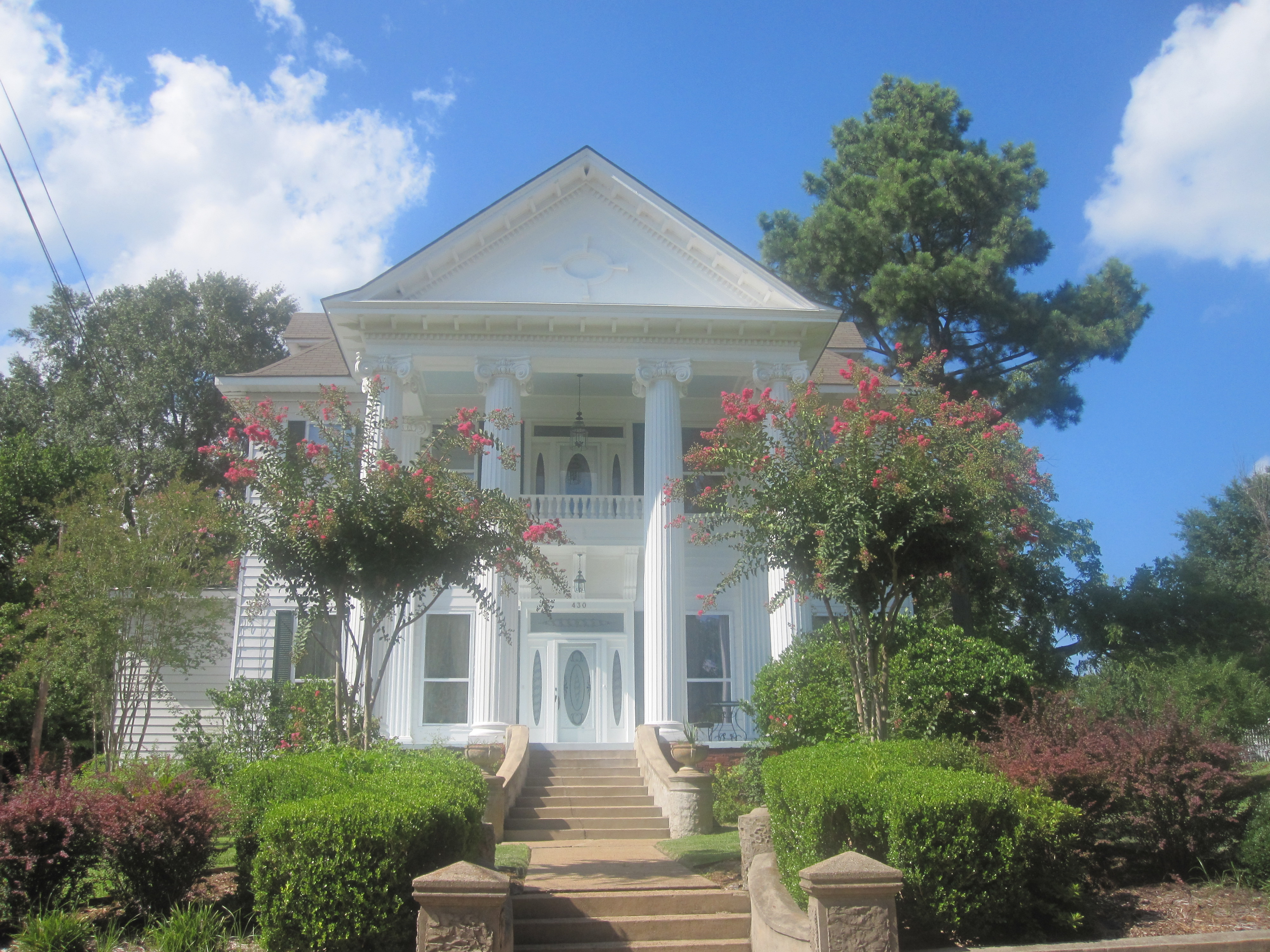
- House on Clifton Street

- Location within Arkansas Location within the United States
- Location: Roughly bounded by Clifton, and Greening Sts., and Dallas, and Cleveland Aves., Camden, Arkansas
- Area: 25 acres (10 ha)
- Architect: Multiple, including Charles L. Thompson
- Architectural style: Queen Anne, Bungalow/craftsman
- NRHP reference No.: 98000911 (original); 01001232 (increase 1); 07000955 (increase 2); 11000691 (increase 3)

Significant dates
- Added to NRHP: August 14, 1998
- Boundary increases: November 19, 2001; September 19, 2007; September 13, 2011

The Clifton and Greening Streets Historic District is a residential historic district in Camden, Arkansas. It encompasses a neighborhood area that typifies the growth of the city between about 1890 and 1940. When first listed on the National Register of Historic Places in 1998, it consisted of properties on Clifton Street between Cleveland and Dallas Avenues, and on Greening Street between Cleveland and Spring Avenues. The district has been enlarged three times, each time to add a few additional properties.

The Clifton and Greening Street area did not see any significant development until the 1890s. The oldest surviving houses in the district is the c. 1890 Queen Anne style Greening House (512 Greening Street), which was followed in the first decade of the 20th century by a number of large and stylish Colonial Revival houses. The regional oil boom of the 1920s brought new construction, mainly Craftsman in style, while a third wave of building occurred in the pre- and post-World War II period.

The district has three institutional buildings. The Garrison Auditorium, built in 1939, is the only surviving remnant of the Clevaland School, and is still used for community functions. It is connected via a covered passage to a modern school administration building. The third non-residential building is the Corner Grocery at Clifton and Cleveland, built in the 1920s. One natural feature is also included in the district: a deep ravine at the eastern end of the district is said to contain the only spring in the city limits.

== See also ==
- National Register of Historic Places listings in Ouachita County, Arkansas
