= Tates Bluff, Arkansas =

- Unincorporated community
- Location within Arkansas Location within the United States
- Coordinates: 33°47′56″N 92°54′04″W
- Country: United States
- State: Arkansas
- County: Ouachita
- Elevation: 200 ft (61 m)
- Time zone: UTC-6 (Central (CST))
  - Summer (DST): UTC-5 (CDT)
- Area code: 870
- GNIS feature ID: 57203

Tates Bluff is an unincorporated community in Ouachita County, Arkansas, United States. Tates Bluff is located near the northern border of Ouachita County, 15.2 miles (24.5 km) north-northwest of Camden. The Tate's Bluff Fortification, which is listed on the National Register of Historic Places, is located near Tates Bluff.
