= Ouachita County Courthouse =

- U.S. National Register of Historic Places
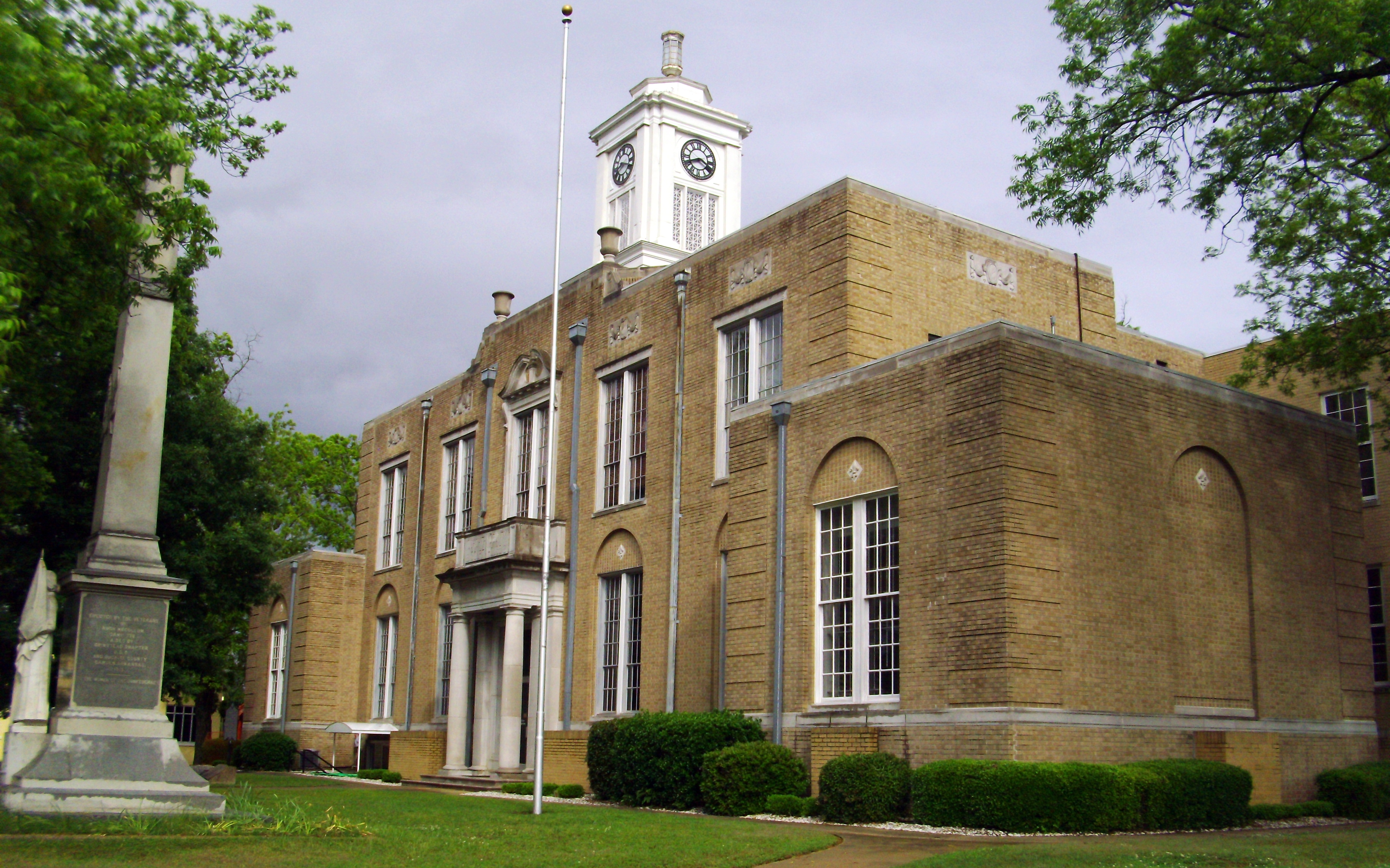

- Location within Arkansas Location within the United States
- Location: 145 Jefferson Ave., Camden, Arkansas
- Coordinates: 33°35′4″N 92°49′49″W
- Area: less than one acre
- Built: 1933
- Built by: William Peterson
- Architect: Thomas Harding Jr.
- Architectural style: Colonial Revival
- NRHP reference No.: 89001958
- Added to NRHP: November 13, 1989

The Ouachita County Courthouse is located at 145 Jefferson Avenue in Camden, Arkansas, the seat of Ouachita County. The two-story brick and concrete structure was designed by Little Rock architect Thomas Harding, and completed in 1933. The architecturally distinctive building exhibits a restrained Colonial Revival style, which was then passing out of fashion, with elements of Art Deco. It is a T-shaped building with symmetrical wings flanking a Classical style columned and gabled portico.

The building was listed on the National Register of Historic Places in 1989.

== See also ==
- National Register of Historic Places listings in Ouachita County, Arkansas
