= Frenchport, Arkansas =

- Unincorporated community
- Location within Arkansas Location within the United States
- Coordinates: 33°28′16″N 92°46′41″W
- Country: United States
- State: Arkansas
- County: Ouachita
- Elevation: 236 ft (72 m)
- Time zone: UTC-6 (Central (CST))
  - Summer (DST): UTC-5 (CDT)
- Area code: 870
- GNIS feature ID: 76979

Frenchport is an unincorporated community in Ouachita County, Arkansas, United States. Frenchport is located on local roads 8.4 miles (13.5 km) south-southeast of Camden. The Capt. John T. Burkett House, which is listed on the National Register of Historic Places, is located near Frenchport.

== History ==
The area now called Frenchport was settled around 1848 when the French families named Fogle, Labeff, Pedron, Portier, Marois, and Preveto settled. The families came from France via New Orleans. They traveled up the Ouachita River until encountering an impassible logjam. The families chose to stay at that location and build farmsteads. Following settlers named the area for the original French settlers. Pedron's Lake was named for Victor Pedron, who acquired the land the former river bed set on.

In the 1860s much of the surrounding land as claimed at the Federal Land Patent Office by John Hays (80 acres), Edward Scogin (120 acres), both of whom paid cash, and Hugh Simpson & Associates (240 acres) who used the 1855 Scrip Warrant Act due to his service in the Georgia Militia for service against the Cherokee and for California in the Mexican-American War.

The community grew due to its location on the river as port for shipping cotton crops downstream to New Orleans from Ouachita and Union Counties. A ferry also operated at the Frenchport landing. A trading post did business with fur trappers and natives in the area. The first post office opened in 1878 and operated until it was merged with nearby Louann, Arkansas. The school at Frenchport was a seasonal school that only operated for 4 months a year, through 8th grade due to local farming family needs. The school consolidated with Fairview in 1926. J.T. McMahan, a Civil War veteran, donated the land for the McMahan Chapel, a Methodist church that stood at the intersection of the roads to Louann and Smackover, Arkansas. The church services were among the first to be integrated. In the 1920s J.M. Moore had a grocery store just behind McMahan’s Chapel. Peter Fogle ran a store north of Moore’s Grocery and N.H. Milner had a store about two miles from there.

The community lost importance with the growth of railroad shipping and no depot location, as well as no major highways running through the area.
