= Washington Street Historic District (Camden, Arkansas) =

Historic district in Arkansas, United States

- U.S. National Register of Historic Places
- U.S. Historic district
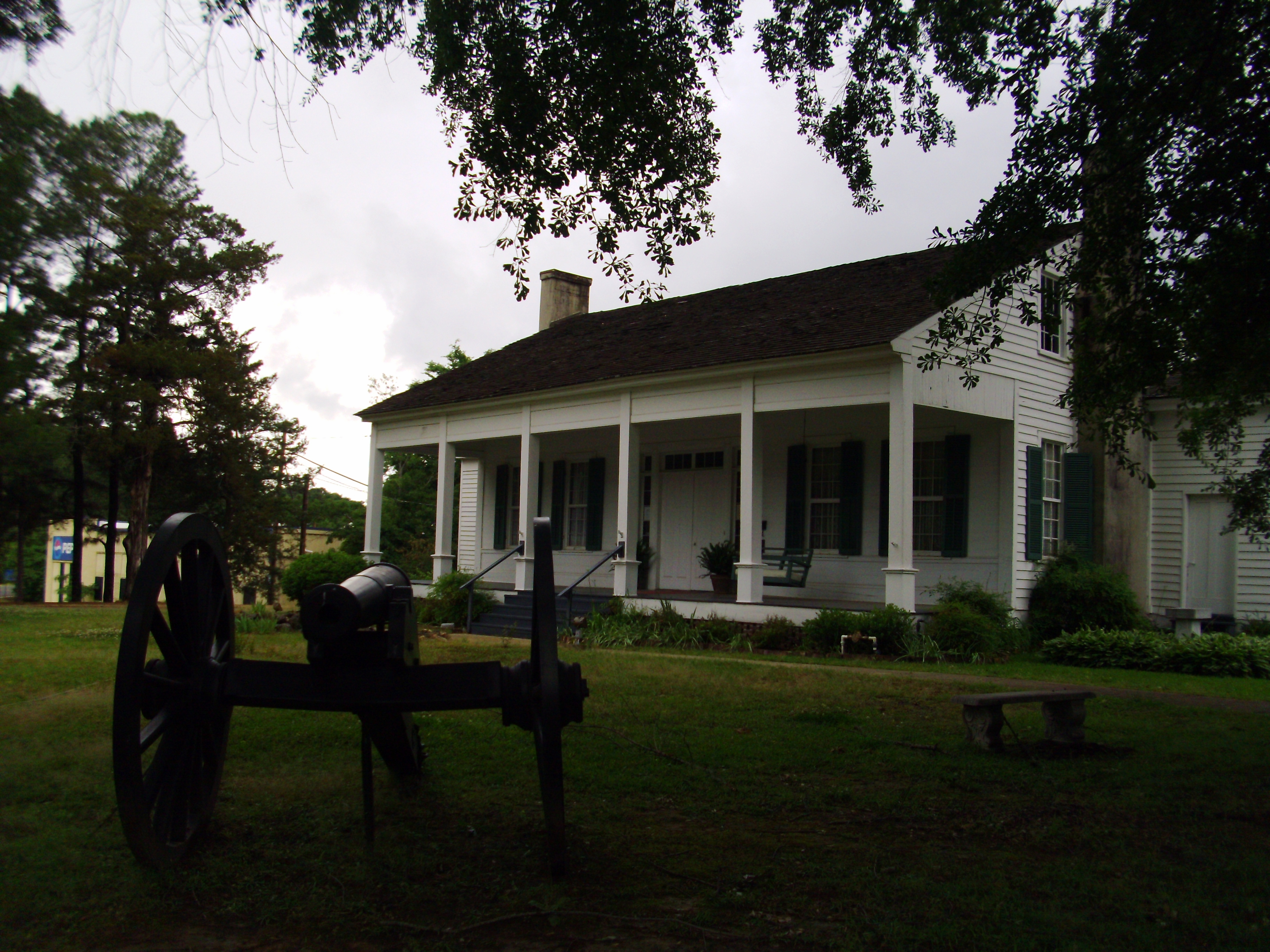
- McCollum-Chidester House, a part of the district

- Location within Arkansas Location within the United States
- Location: 404-926 W. Washington, 619-816 Graham, 116-132 N. Cleveland, 131-139 N. Agee and 132 N. California, Camden, Arkansas
- Coordinates: 33.58353°N 92.84331°W
- Area: 31 acres (13 ha)
- Architect: Watts, Charlie; et al.
- Architectural style: Late 19th And 20th Century Revivals, Queen Anne
- NRHP reference No.: 09001256 (original); 100002455 (increase)

Significant dates
- Added to NRHP: January 22, 2010
- Boundary increase: May 21, 2018

The Washington Street Historic District of Camden, Arkansas, encompasses an area that has been a fashionable residential area for much of the city's history. It includes six blocks of Washington Street, three of Graham Street (which runs parallel to Washington), and three connecting streets. The oldest houses in this area are pre-Civil War Greek Revival houses, built in the 1840s and 1850s when Camden was at its height as a major regional center of the cotton trade. Another round of development took place late in the 19th century after the railroad arrived, resulting in a number of Queen Anne, Colonial Revival, and Classical Revival houses. The last major building spurt took place during southern Arkansas' oil boom in the 1920s and 1930s, when Mission/Spanish Revival, Mediterranean, and English Revival houses were built. The district included 68 contributing properties when it was first listed on the National Register of Historic Places in 2010. Six structures were previously listed separately on the National Register. The district was enlarged in 2018.

== See also ==
- National Register of Historic Places listings in Ouachita County, Arkansas
