= T.C. McRae House =

Historic house in Arkansas, United States

- T. C. McRae House
- U.S. National Register of Historic Places
- Location within Arkansas Location within the United States
- Location: 506 E. Elm St., Prescott, Arkansas
- Coordinates: 33°47′52″N 93°22′40″W
- Area: less than one acre
- Built: 1919
- Architect: Charles L. Thompson and Harding
- Architectural style: Bungalow/craftsman style
- MPS: Thompson, Charles L., Design Collection TR
- NRHP reference No.: 82000870
- Added to NRHP: December 22, 1982

The T.C. McRae House is a historic house at 506 East Elm Street in Prescott, Arkansas. This 2 1/2-story wood-frame house was designed by Charles L. Thompson and built in 1919. Its craftsman style includes a shed-roof entry porch with large brackets and exposed rafter ends. It is one of a number of buildings commissioned from Thompson by the McRae family.

The house was listed on the National Register of Historic Places in 1982.

== See also ==
- D.L. McRae House
- National Register of Historic Places listings in Nevada County, Arkansas
