= D.L. McRae House =

Historic house in Arkansas, United States

- D. L. McRae House
- U.S. National Register of Historic Places
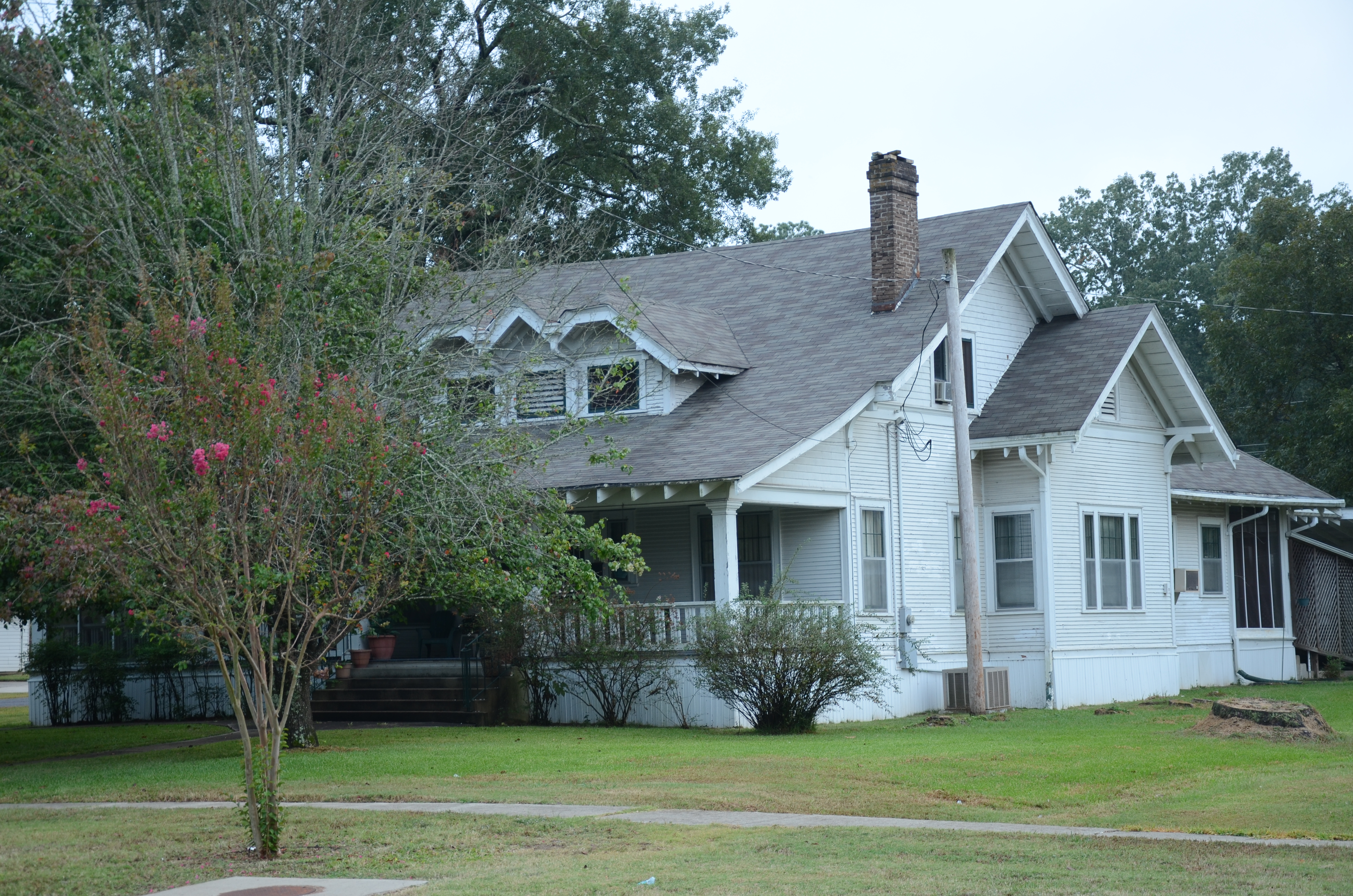

- Location within Arkansas Location within the United States
- Location: 424 E. Main St., Prescott, Arkansas
- Coordinates: 33°47′57″N 93°22′38″W
- Area: less than one acre
- Built: 1912
- Architect: Charles L. Thompson
- Architectural style: Bungalow/craftsman
- MPS: Thompson, Charles L., Design Collection TR
- NRHP reference No.: 82000869
- Added to NRHP: December 22, 1982

The D.L. McRae House is a historic house at 424 East Main Street in Prescott, Arkansas. This 1 1/2-story wood-frame house was designed by Charles L. Thompson and built c. 1912. It is a well-preserved example of Thompson's work in a small-town setting, featuring Craftsman styling and a relatively unusual porch balustrade, with groups of three slender balusters clustered between porch columns.

The house was listed on the National Register of Historic Places in 1982.

== See also ==
- T.C. McRae House
- National Register of Historic Places listings in Nevada County, Arkansas
