= Allen Tire Company and Gas Station =

- Formerly listed on the U.S. National Register of Historic Places
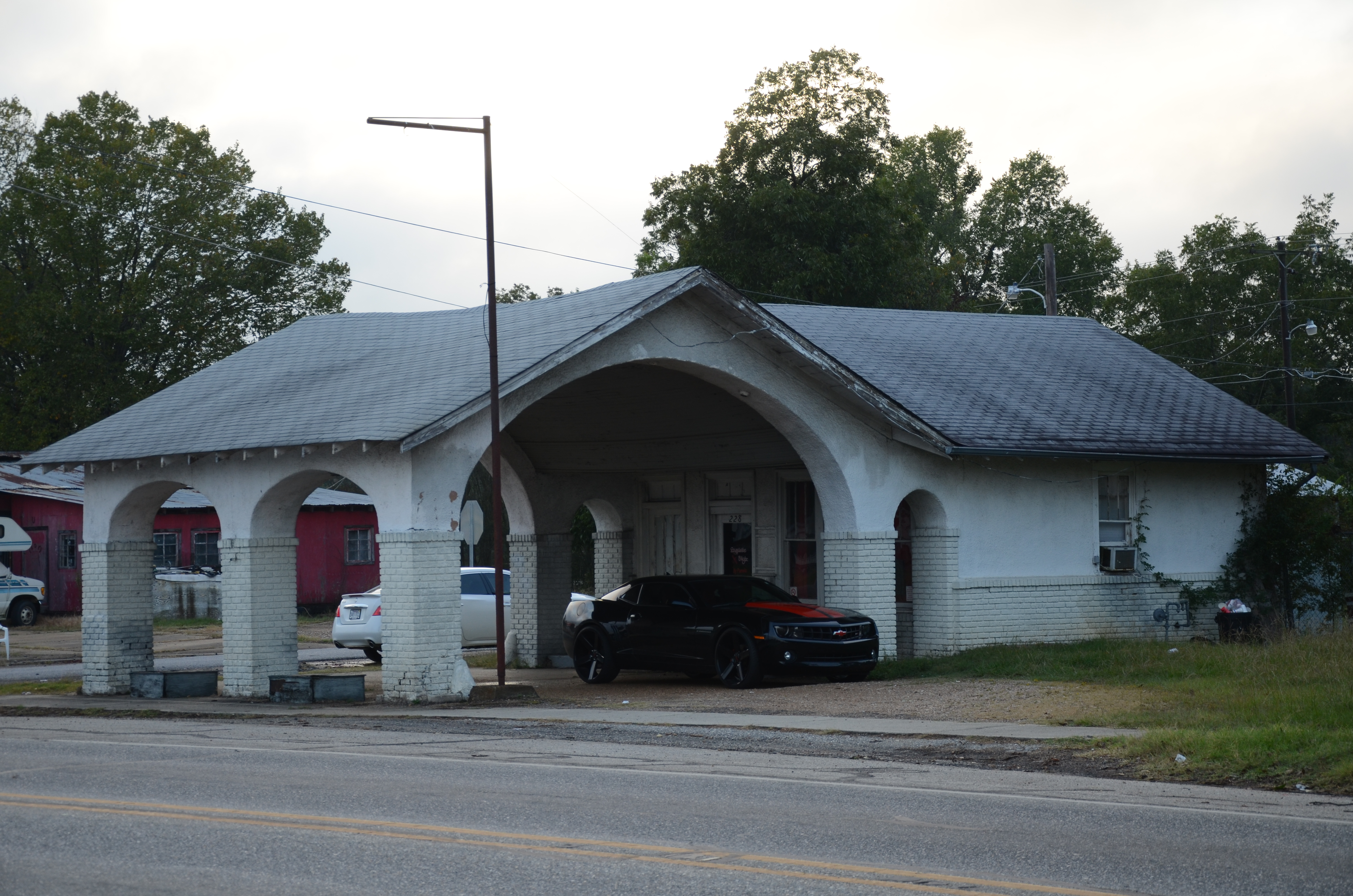

- Location within Arkansas Location within the United States
- Location: 228 1st St., SW, Prescott, Arkansas
- Coordinates: 33°48′5″N 93°22′56″W
- Area: less than one acre
- Built: 1924
- Architect: Henry H. Allen
- Architectural style: Bungalow/craftsman
- MPS: Arkansas Highway History and Architecture MPS
- NRHP reference No.: 01000523

Significant dates
- Added to NRHP: May 25, 2001
- Removed from NRHP: September 30, 2019

The Allen Tire Company and Gas Station is an historic former automotive service facility at 228 1st Street SW (United States Route 67) in Prescott, Arkansas. It is a single-story Craftsman style structure that was built in 1924. Its main architectural features are a variety of arches, which flank the ends and street face of the carport, as well as the doorway into the office. Additional Craftsman features include exposed rafter ends and three-over-one windows. The building acted as a service station into the 1940s, and has seen a variety of other commercial and retail uses since then.

The property was listed on the National Register of Historic Places in 2001, and was delisted in 2019.

== See also ==
- National Register of Historic Places listings in Nevada County, Arkansas
