= Prescott City Jail =

- U.S. National Register of Historic Places
- U.S. Historic district – Contributing property
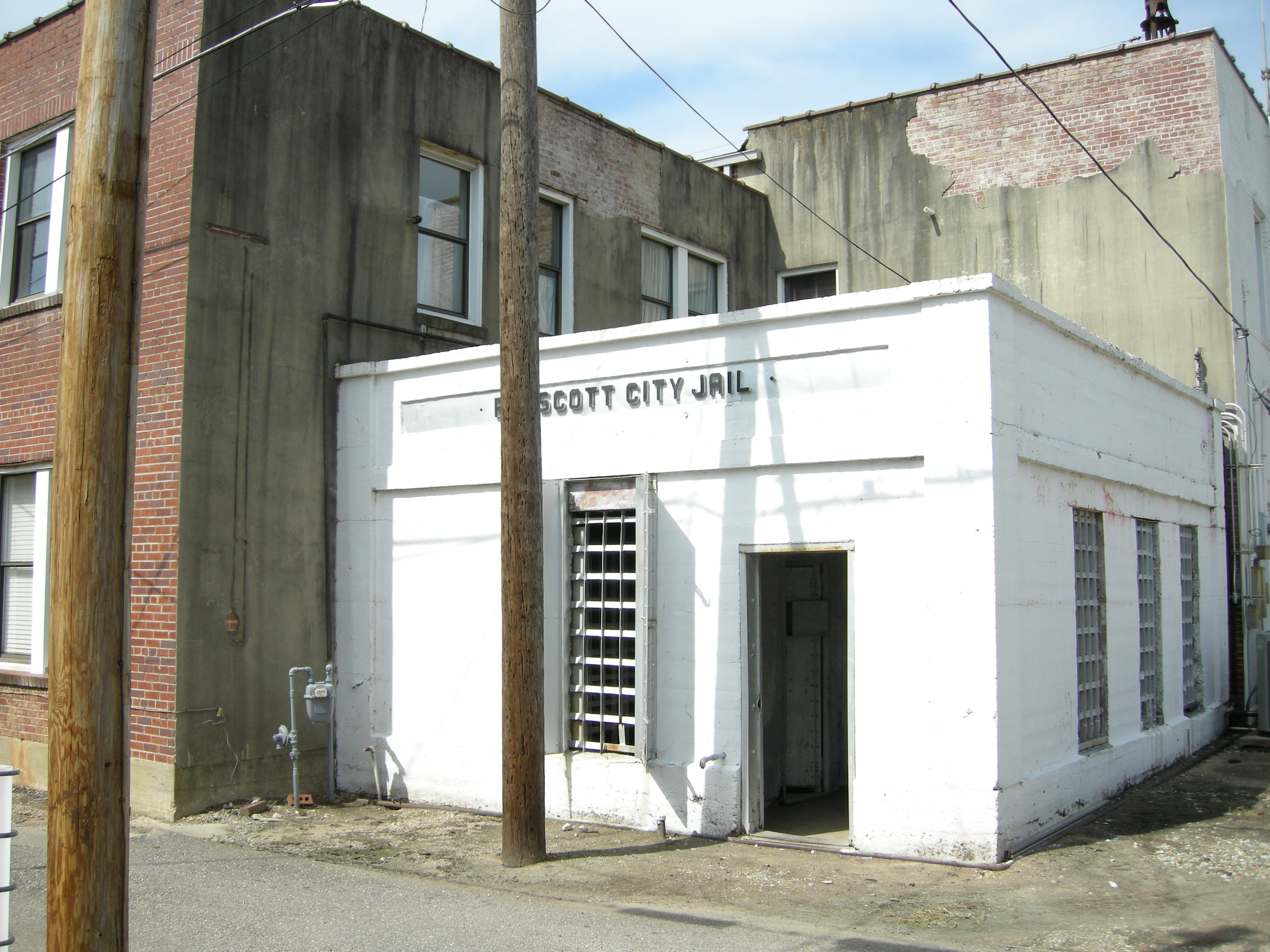
- Front of the jail

- Location within Arkansas Location within the United States
- Location: Alley behind City Hall at 118 W. Elm St., Prescott, Arkansas
- Coordinates: 33°48′15″N 93°22′56″W
- Area: less than one acre
- Built: 1912
- Built by: Southern Structural Steel Co.
- Architectural style: Plain Traditional
- Part of: Prescott Commercial Historic District (ID08000818)
- NRHP reference No.: 05001077

Significant dates
- Added to NRHP: September 28, 2005
- Designated CP: December 24, 2008

The Prescott City Jail is a historic city jail behind the city hall of Prescott, Arkansas. The modest single-story structure was built for the city in 1912 by the Southern Structural Steel Company. It is built of reinforced concrete, with metal grates covering unglazed window openings, and a doorway that is reinforced with heavy metal shutters. It was built to replace an early jail, from which a suspect involved in the burglary of a prominent citizen's home had escaped, in part due to its poor condition. This building, housing three cells, served the city until the 1960s.

The jail was listed on the National Register of Historic Places in 2005.

== Gallery ==
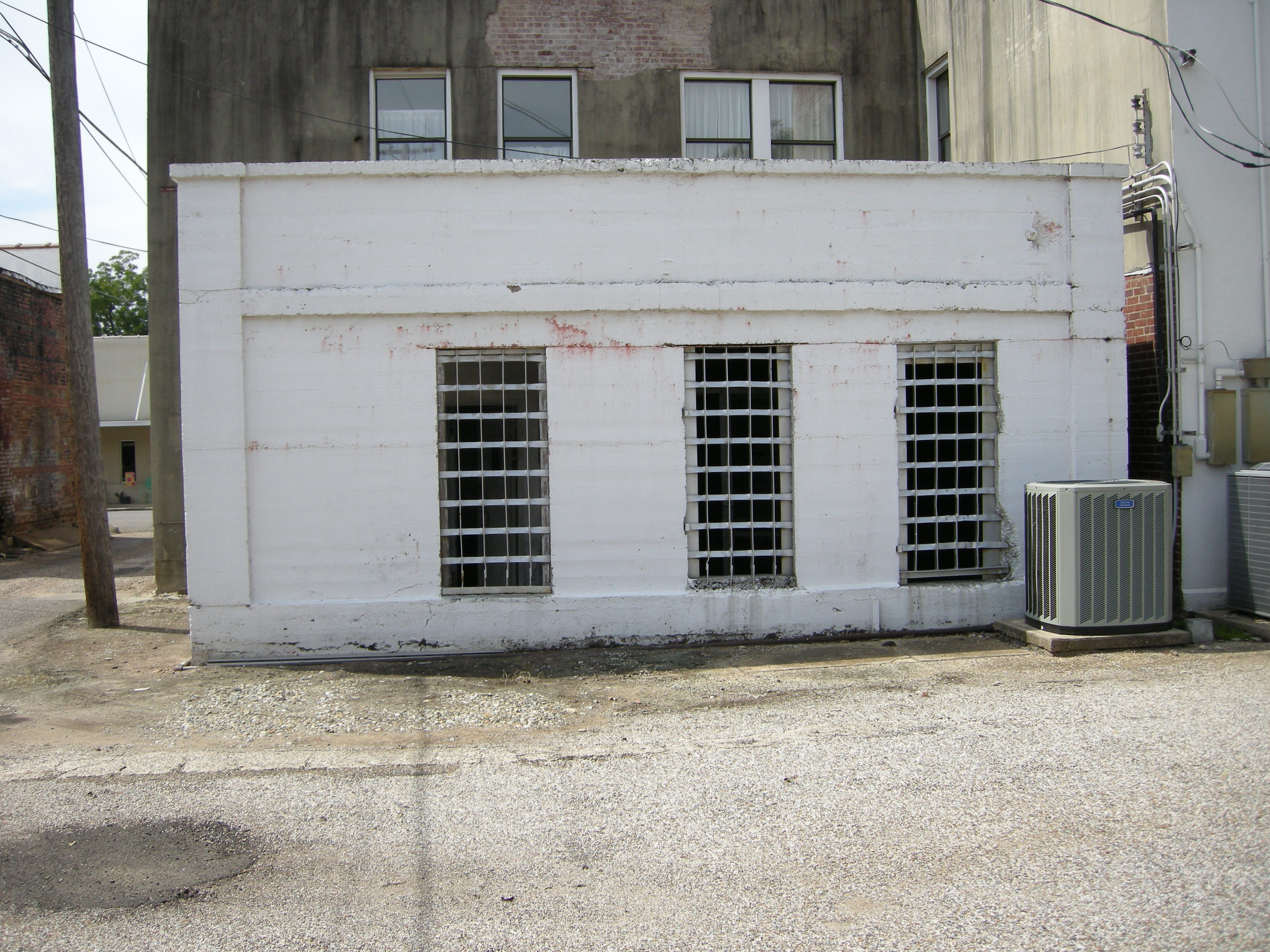
Side of the jail

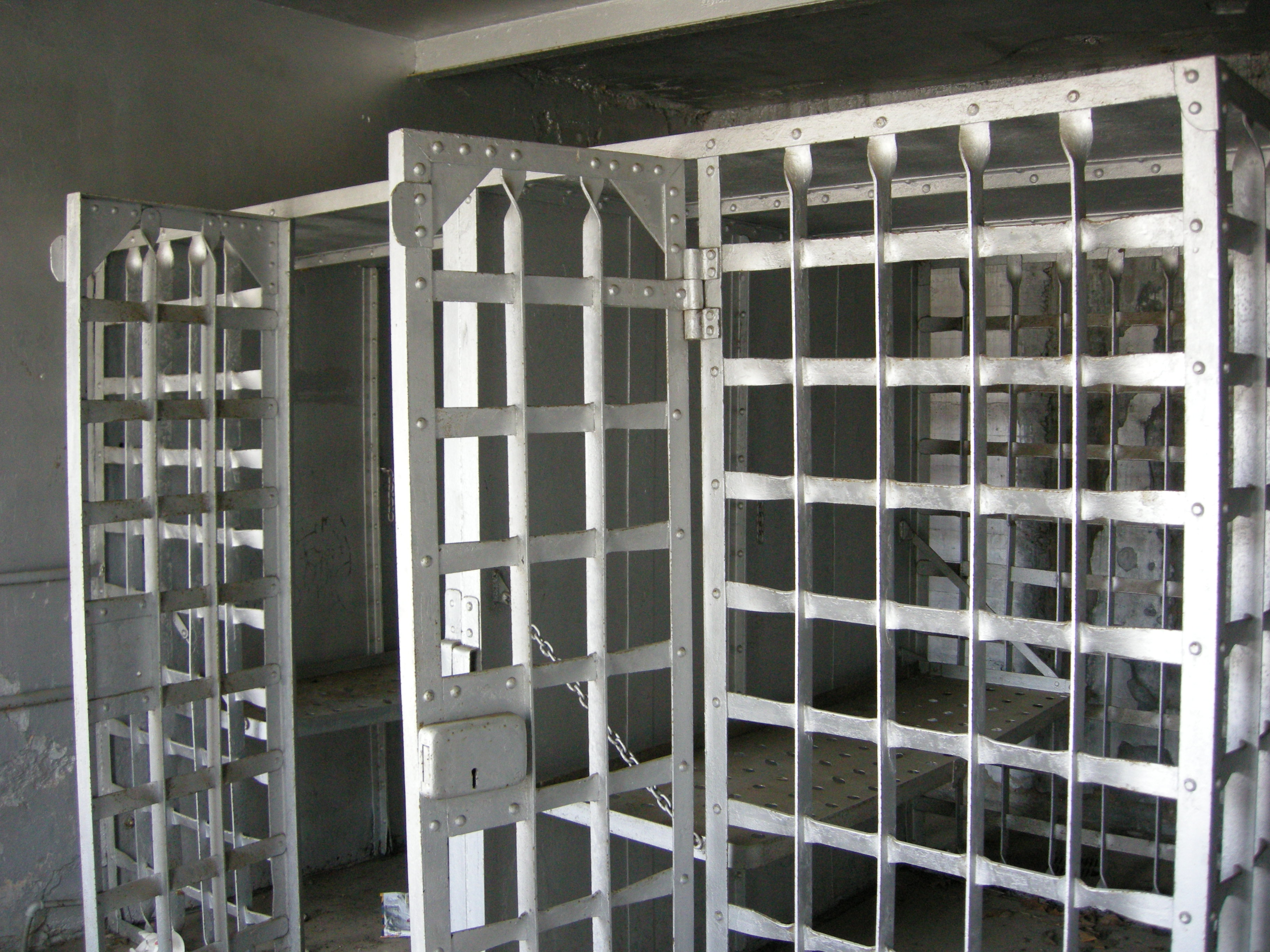
A cell inside the jail

== See also ==
- National Register of Historic Places listings in Nevada County, Arkansas
