= Nevada County Courthouse =

- U.S. National Register of Historic Places
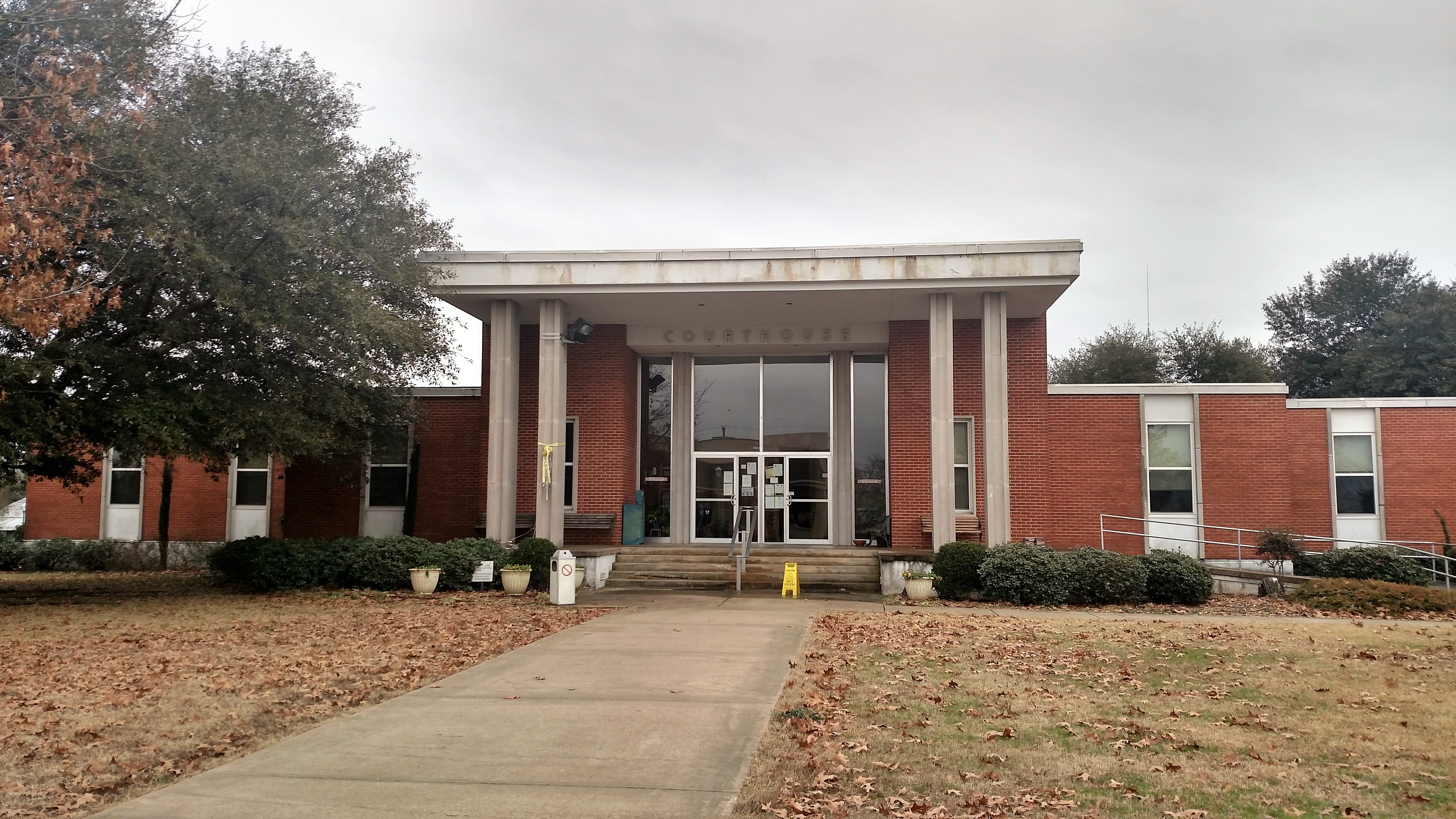

- Location within Arkansas Location within the United States
- Interactive map showing the location of Nevada County Courthouse
- Location: 215 E 2nd St., Prescott, Arkansas
- Coordinates: 33°48′1″N 93°22′52″W
- Area: less than one acre
- Built: 1964
- Architect: Weaver & Hiegel
- Architectural style: Modern
- NRHP reference No.: 100002454
- Added to NRHP: May 24, 2018

The Nevada County Courthouse is located at 215 East 2nd Street in the center of Prescott, the county seat of Nevada County, Arkansas. The Mid-Century Modern building was designed by Weaver and Hiegel, an architectural firm based in Little Rock, and was built in 1964 on the site of the previous courthouse. The exterior is predominantly red brick, with trim and accent features of cast stone. The main facade is symmetrical, with the entrance recessed at the center and sheltered by a tall projecting portico supported by square cast stone columns.

The building was listed on the National Register of Historic Places in 2018.

== See also ==
- National Register of Historic Places listings in Nevada County, Arkansas
