= US 67 Bridge over Little Missouri River =

- U.S. National Register of Historic Places
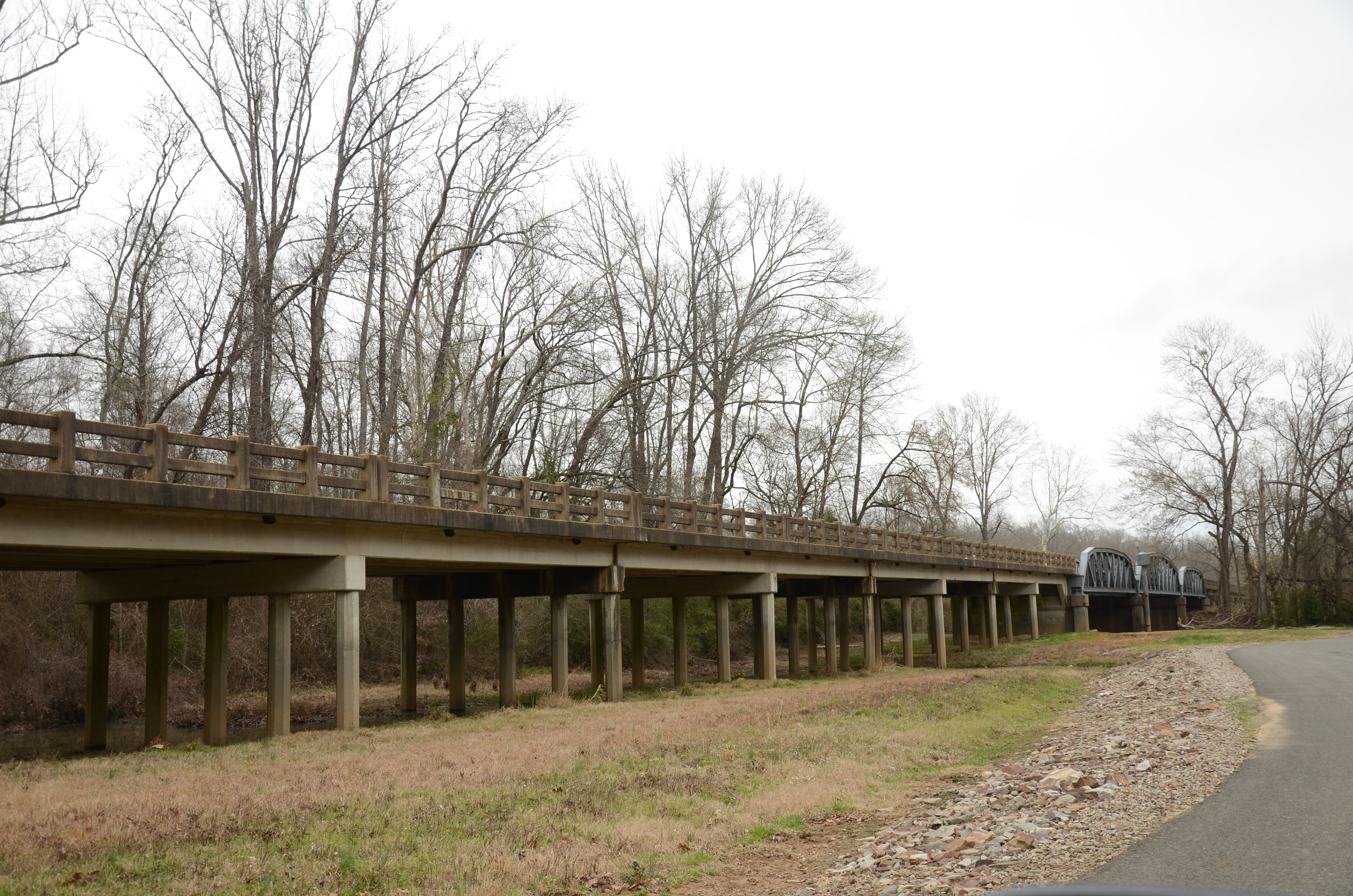

- Location within Arkansas Location within the United States
- Nearest city: Prescott, Arkansas
- Coordinates: 33°52′48″N 93°18′16″W
- Area: less than one acre
- Built: 1931
- Built by: Vincennes Bridge Co.
- Architectural style: Parker Pony truss
- MPS: Historic Bridges of Arkansas MPS
- NRHP reference No.: 06001271
- Added to NRHP: January 24, 2007

The US 67 Bridge over Little Missouri River is a historic bridge carrying U.S. Route 67 (US 67) over the Little Missouri River, the border between Clark County and Nevada County, Arkansas. It consists of three steel Parker Pony trusses, with a total length of 1,161 feet (354 m). Built in 1931, it is one of only seven surviving multi-span Parker truss bridges in the state.

The bridge was listed on the National Register of Historic Places in 2007.

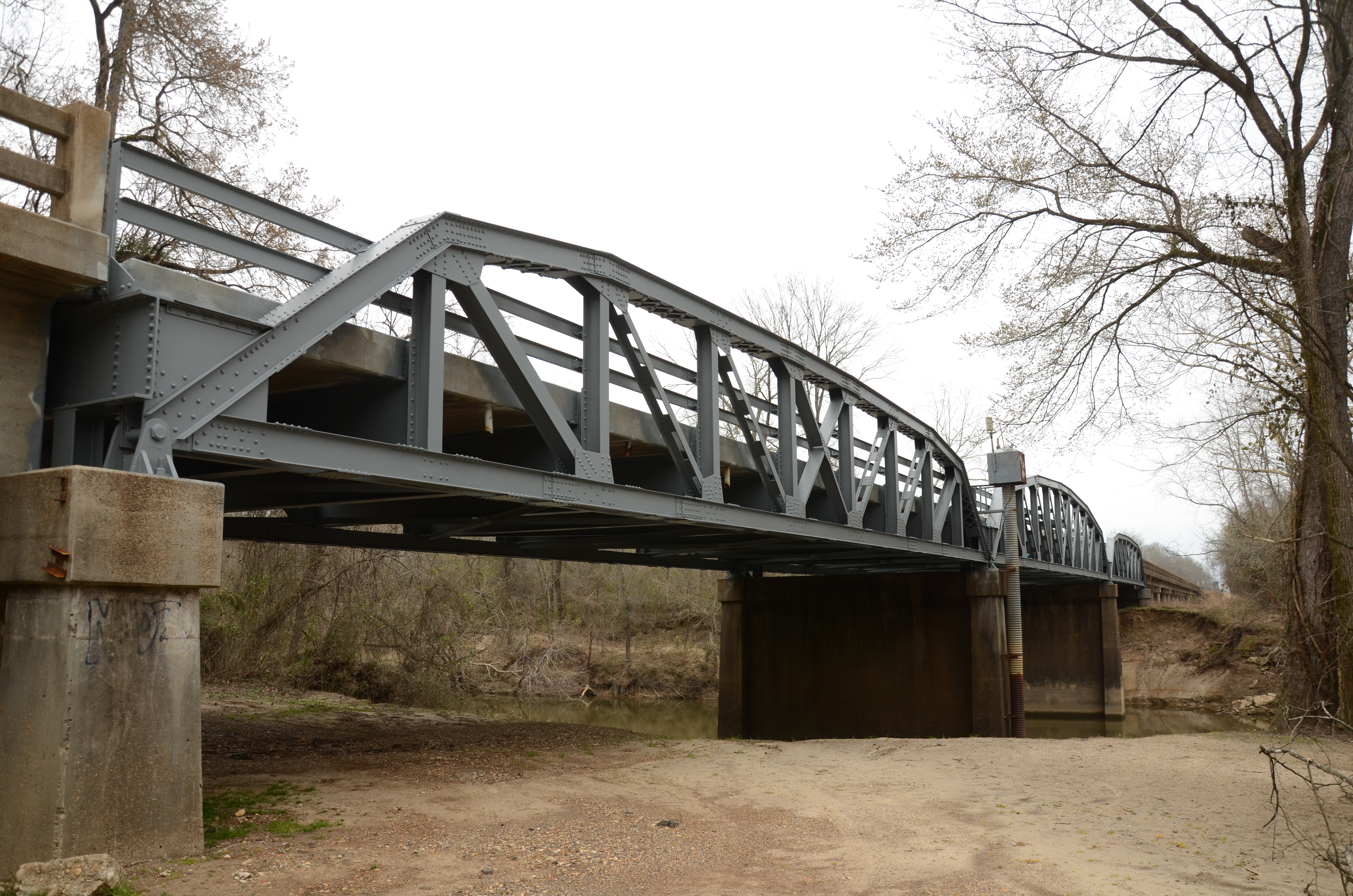
Truss section

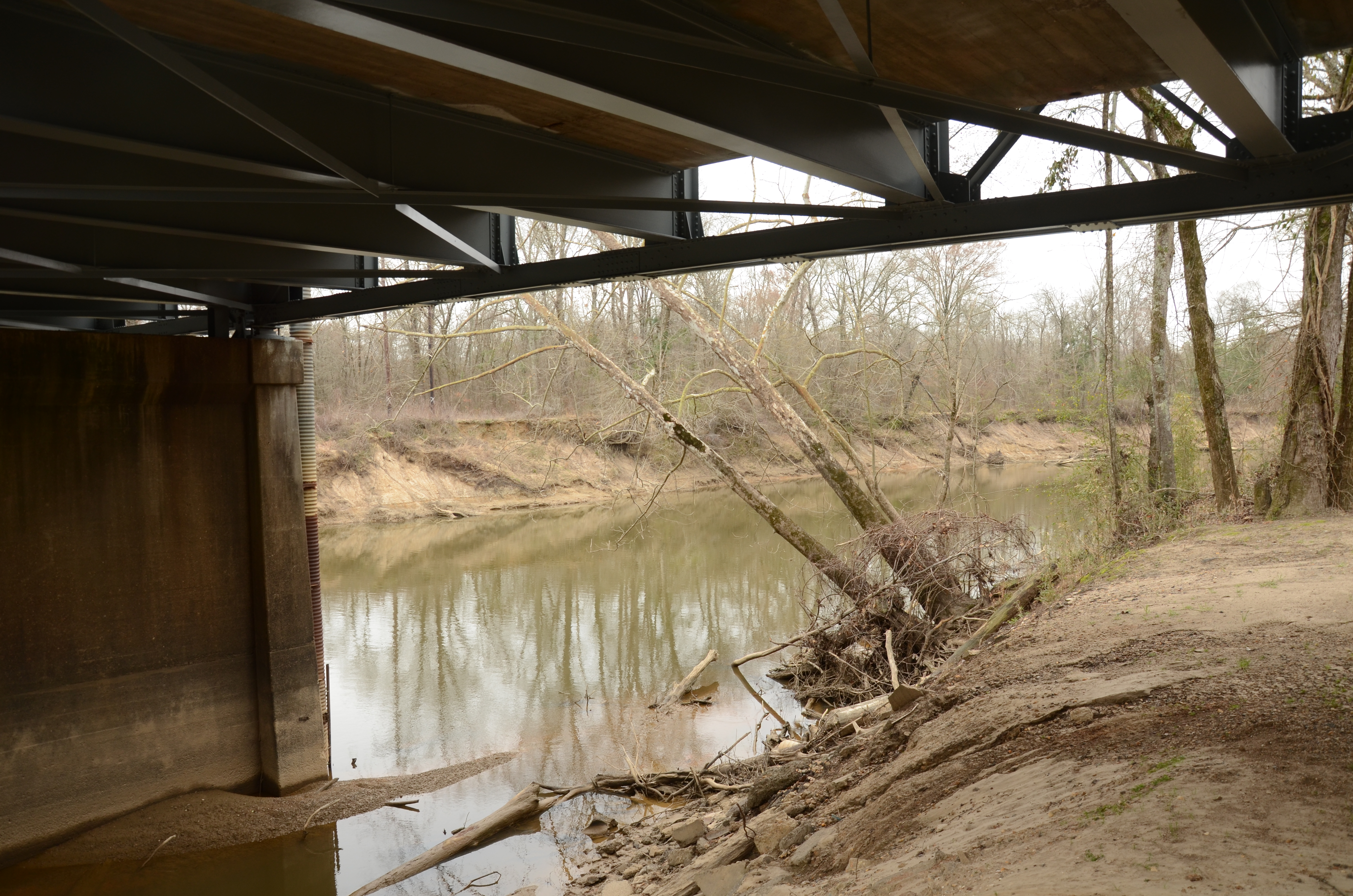
Scouring following 2015 flooding.

== See also ==
- List of bridges on the National Register of Historic Places in Arkansas
- National Register of Historic Places listings in Clark County, Arkansas
- National Register of Historic Places listings in Nevada County, Arkansas
