= Prescott City Cemetery =

Historic cemetery in Arkansas, United States

- De Ann Cemetery Historic Section
- U.S. National Register of Historic Places
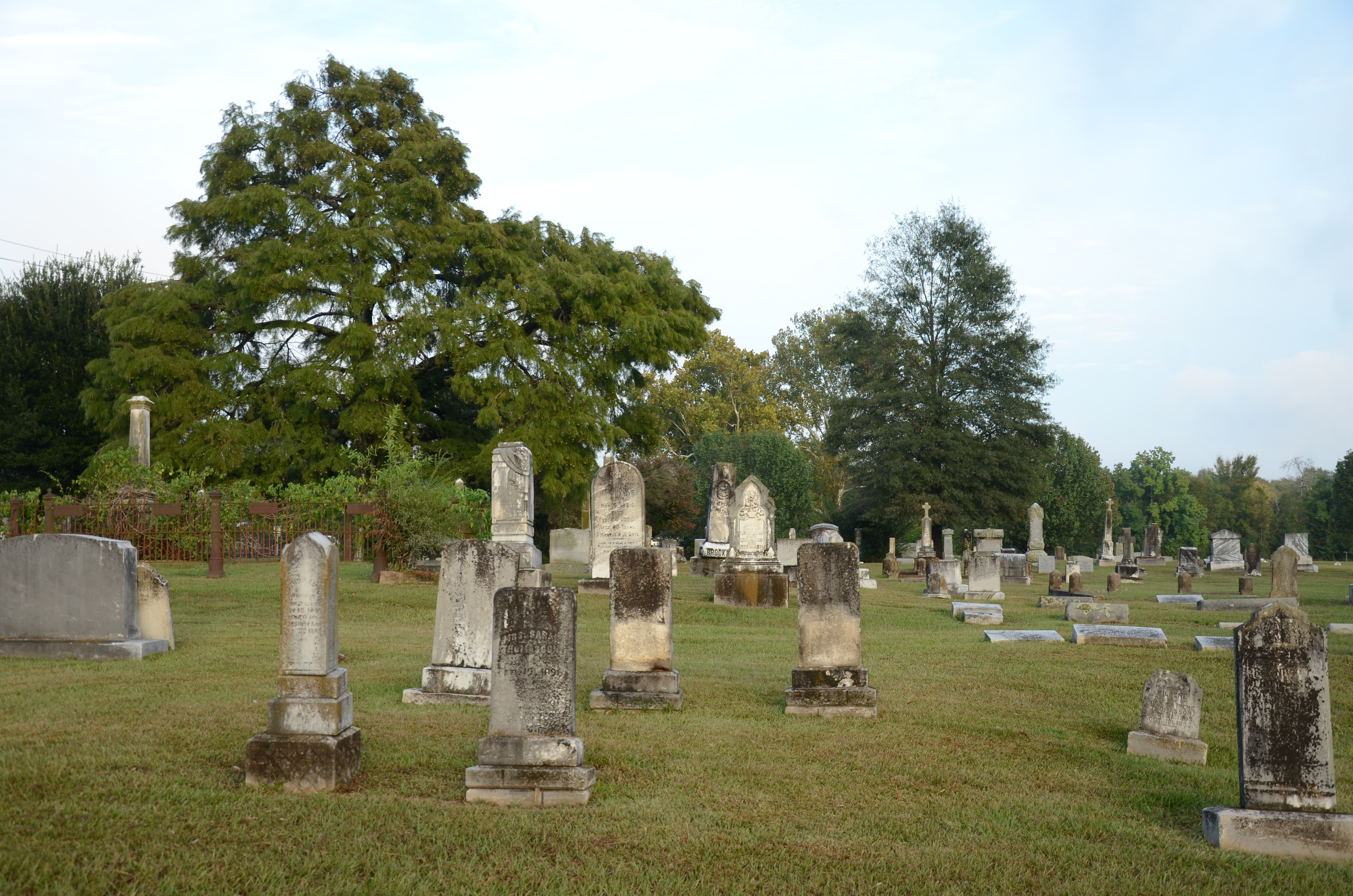

- Location within Arkansas Location within the United States
- Nearest city: Prescott, Arkansas
- Coordinates: 33°48′38″N 93°23′32″W
- Area: 4.1 acres (1.7 ha)
- Built: 1871
- NRHP reference No.: 05000498
- Added to NRHP: June 1, 2005

The Prescott City Cemetery is the principal burying ground for Prescott, Arkansas. It is located in the northwestern part of the city and is roughly bisected by United States Route 371. The modern (20th-century) portion of the cemetery is located on one side of the highway, while a historic section, also known as the De Ann Cemetery Historic Section, is located on the other. The historic section dates back to not long after the 1874 founding of Prescott, and was formally conveyed to the city as a burial ground in 1880. Slightly more than 4 acres (1.6 ha) in size, the cemetery is divided into a section for whites, containing more than 600 known graves, and a section for African Americans, which has 95 marked graves. The site is also known to contain a large number of unmarked graves. Many of Prescott's founders are interred here.

The historic portion of the cemetery was listed on the National Register of Historic Places in 2005.

== See also ==
- National Register of Historic Places listings in Nevada County, Arkansas
