= Prescott Commercial Historic District =

Historic district in Arkansas, United States

- U.S. National Register of Historic Places
- U.S. Historic district
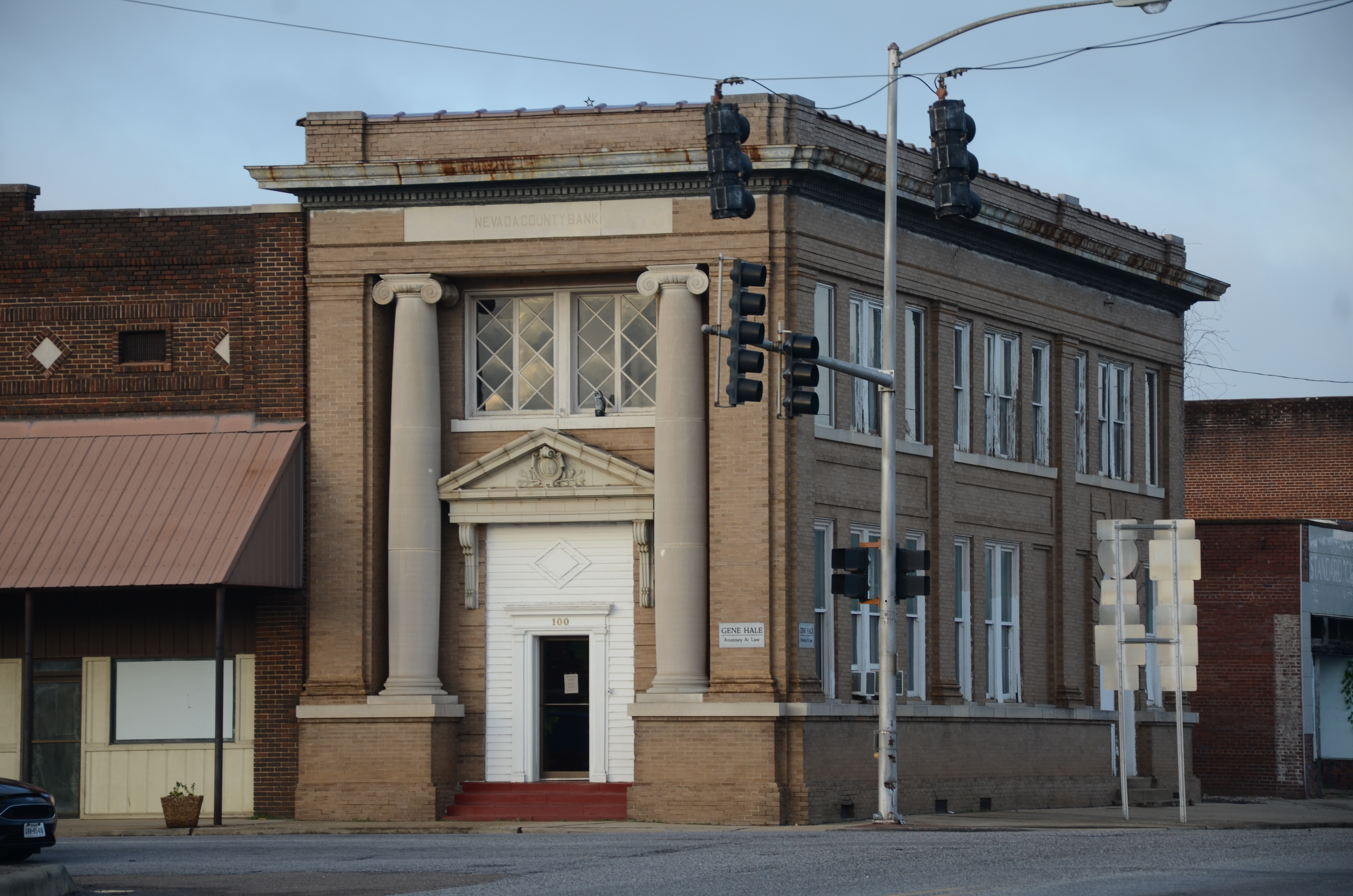

- Location within Arkansas Location within the United States
- Location: Roughly bounded by E. 3rd St., Walnut St., W. 3rd St. and Pine St., Prescott, Arkansas
- Coordinates: 33.80214°N 93.38138°W
- Area: 15 acres (6.1 ha)
- Built: 1890
- Architectural style: Early Commercial, Classical Revival, Colonial revival
- NRHP reference No.: 08000818
- Added to NRHP: December 24, 2008

The Prescott Commercial Historic District encompasses the historic commercial core of Prescott, Arkansas, the county seat of Nevada County. Prescott was laid out in 1873, after the railroad was built through the area that is now Nevada County, and the railroad has played a significant role in the city's development. The railroad today bisects the commercial core of the city, which extends for several city blocks away from the railroad. The historic district includes all of the major civic buildings of the city, including the courthouse, post office, and the old Prescott City Jail.

The district was listed on the National Register of Historic Places in 2008. It is bounded on the north side of the railroad by Elm, 3rd and Walnut Streets, and on the south by Vine and Main Streets to the east and west, and 3rd Street to the south, although the block of 3rd Street east of the courthouse is excluded, and that west of the courthouse is included.

== See also ==
- National Register of Historic Places listings in Nevada County, Arkansas
