= Ira E. McMillian =

Decorated World War II commander

Ira Ellis McMillian
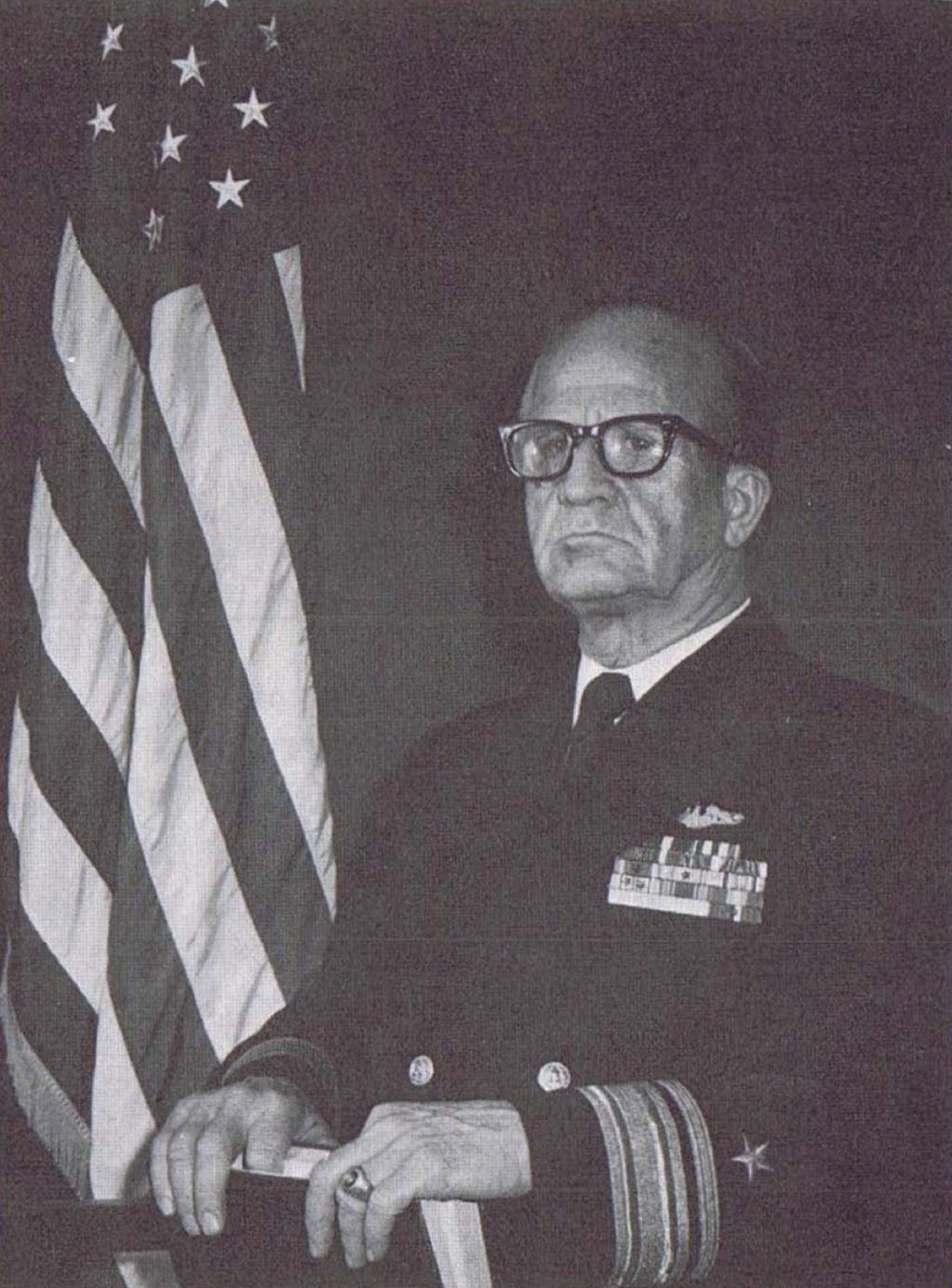
- Born: August 3, 1908; Prescott, Arkansas, U.S.
- Died: April 22, 1987 (aged 78); California, U.S.
- Burial place: Arlington National Cemetery
- Education: United States Naval Academy
- Spouse: Francys Ellen Goss
- Military career
- Allegiance: United States of America
- Branch: United States Navy
- Service years: 1930-1958
- Rank: Rear Admiral
- Commands: USS Newcomb (DD-586); USS Magoffin (APA-199)
- Conflicts: World War II • Pearl Harbor; Korean War
- Awards: Navy Cross; Silver Star; Legion of Merit; Purple Heart

Ira Ellis McMillian (3 August 1908 – 22 April 1987), was a decorated commander during World War II who reached the rank of Rear Admiral in the United States Navy. McMillian was the Gunnery Officer on the USS Hull (DD-350) when the Japanese attacked Pearl Harbor.

Captain McMillian was the president of the court-martial of Disbursing Clerk Seaman Jimmie L. Henderson, the last sailor to be sentenced to death for murder. Seaman Henderson was sentenced for the murder of a commissioned officer aboard the USS Uvalde (AKA-88). The sentence was later commuted to life imprisonment by President John F. Kennedy. "This is the only known death sentence to be awarded by a naval service court-martial and affirmed on appeal through the U.S. Court of Military Appeals since the enactment of the UCMJ."

Admiral McMillian had proposed to Richard Nixon in August 1970 that he could possibly bring the Vietnam War to an end though his personal contact with Lê Duẩn. McMillian then claimed that he was kidnapped and taken to Bethesda Naval Hospital and held there incommunicado for four weeks. Admiral McMillian was named the plaintiff in a class action lawsuit against Henry Kissinger and Richard Nixon, claiming "[that they] and others conspired to kidnap an admiral because he knew of a way to end the Vietnam war two years before Nixon did."
