= McKenzie House =

McKenzie House may refer to:

in Australia

- McKenzie House, Albany, in Albany, Western Australia

in the United States

(by state)

- Henry McKenzie House, Prescott, Arkansas, listed on the National Register of Historic Places (NRHP) in Nevada County
- McKenzie House (Scott, Arkansas), NRHP-listed in Pulaski County
- Mary Phifer McKenzie House, Gainesville, Florida, NRHP-listed
- Robert L. McKenzie House, Panama City, Florida, NRHP-listed
- David McKenzie Log Cabin, Volga, Kentucky, NRHP-listed
- Capers-McKenzie House, Homer, Louisiana, NRHP-listed in Louisiana
- John and Harriet McKenzie House, Oswego, New York, NRHP-listed in Oswego County
- McKenzie-Cassels House, Groton, South Dakota, NRHP-listed in Brown County, South Dakota
- Monroe McKenzie House, Palmyra, Wisconsin, NRHP-listed in Jefferson County
