= Wortham Gymnasium =

- Formerly listed on the U.S. National Register of Historic Places
- Location within Arkansas Location within the United States
- Location: AR 200, Oak Grove, Nevada County, Arkansas
- Coordinates: 33°35′55″N 93°14′19″W
- Area: less than one acre
- Built: 1935
- Architect: Works Progress Administration
- Architectural style: Bungalow/craftsman
- NRHP reference No.: 90000667

Significant dates
- Added to NRHP: April 19, 1990
- Removed from NRHP: September 29, 2015

The Wortham Gymnasium was a historic athletic facility on Arkansas Highway 200 in Oak Grove, a rural community in Nevada County east of Rosston. Built in 1935 by a Works Progress Administration crew, this large gymnasium was the only surviving remnant of a major push in the 1920s and 1930s to improve the education of African Americans in Oak Grove. It was a single-story wood-frame structure with a gable roof, with a shed-roofed vestibule area on the main (southern) facade. At the time of its construction, it was the largest gymnasium in the state.

The building was listed on the National Register of Historic Places in 1990. It was removed from the National Register in 2015.

== See also ==
- National Register of Historic Places listings in Nevada County, Arkansas
