= Camden to Washington Road-Rosston Segment =

Historic road section in Arkansas, US

- U.S. National Register of Historic Places
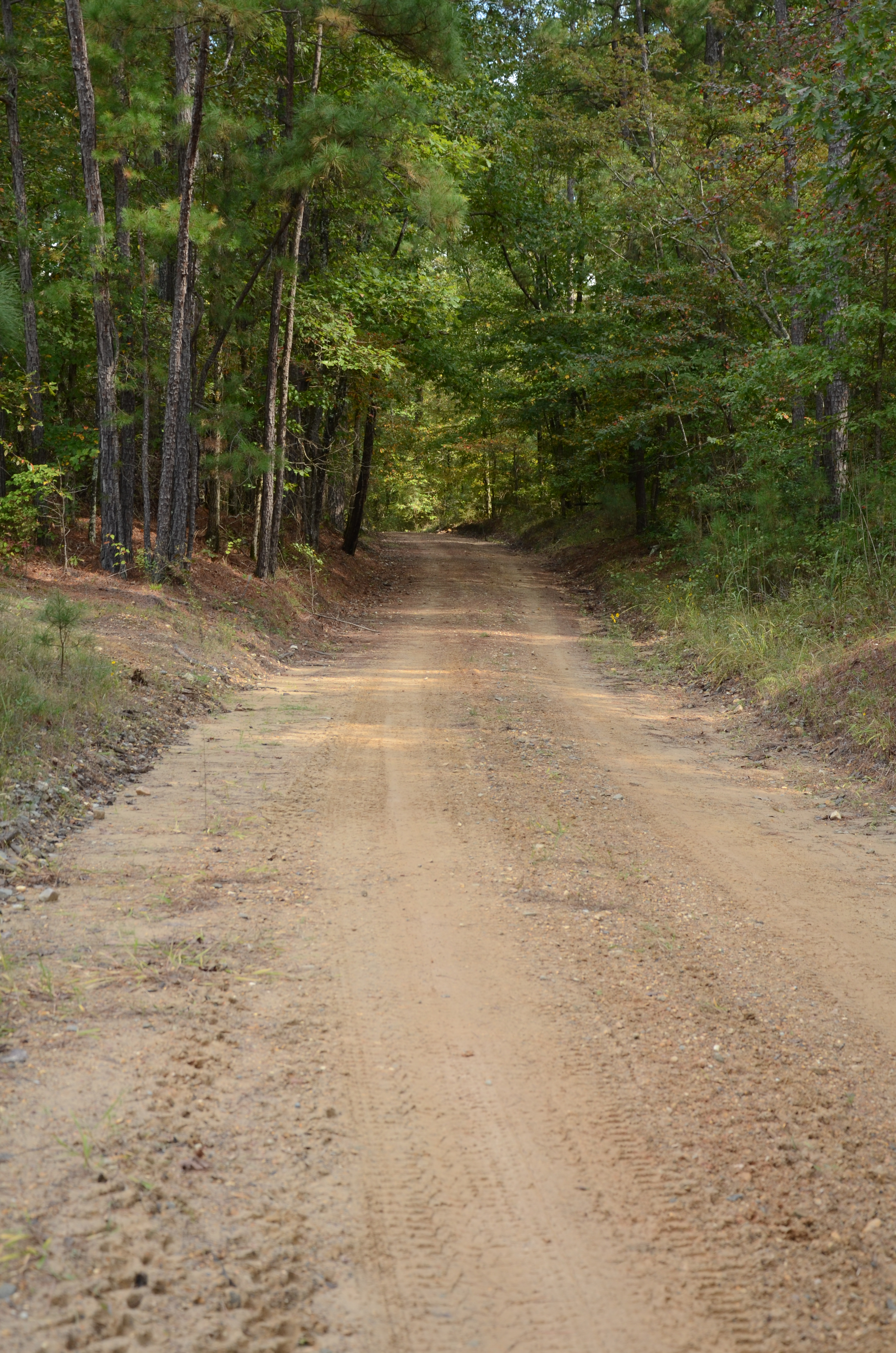

- Location within Arkansas Location within the United States
- Nearest city: Rosston, Arkansas
- Coordinates: 33.5917°N 93.1690°W
- Area: 15.15 acres (6.13 ha)
- Built: 1825
- NRHP reference No.: 08001374
- Added to NRHP: January 29, 2009

The Camden to Washington Road-Rosston Segment is a historic early 19th-century road section in rural Nevada County, Arkansas. It is located east of Rosston in Poison Spring State Forest, and is a former portion of County Road 10 extending east from that road's junction with County Road 47 (Kirk Road). The road was first cut c. 1825, and was never paved or given modern finishing, despite its continued use well into the 20th century. A crossing at Cypress Creek has been compromised by the activities of beavers, and the road is no longer completely passable, possibly excepting high-clearance off-road vehicles. The road section is one of the only sections of the historic post road which connected Washington and Camden to retain its 19th-century character.

The road section was listed on the National Register of Historic Places in 2009. The Carolina Methodist Church is located on this section of road.

== See also ==
- National Register of Historic Places listings in Nevada County, Arkansas
