= Henry McKenzie House =

Historic house in Arkansas, United States

- U.S. National Register of Historic Places
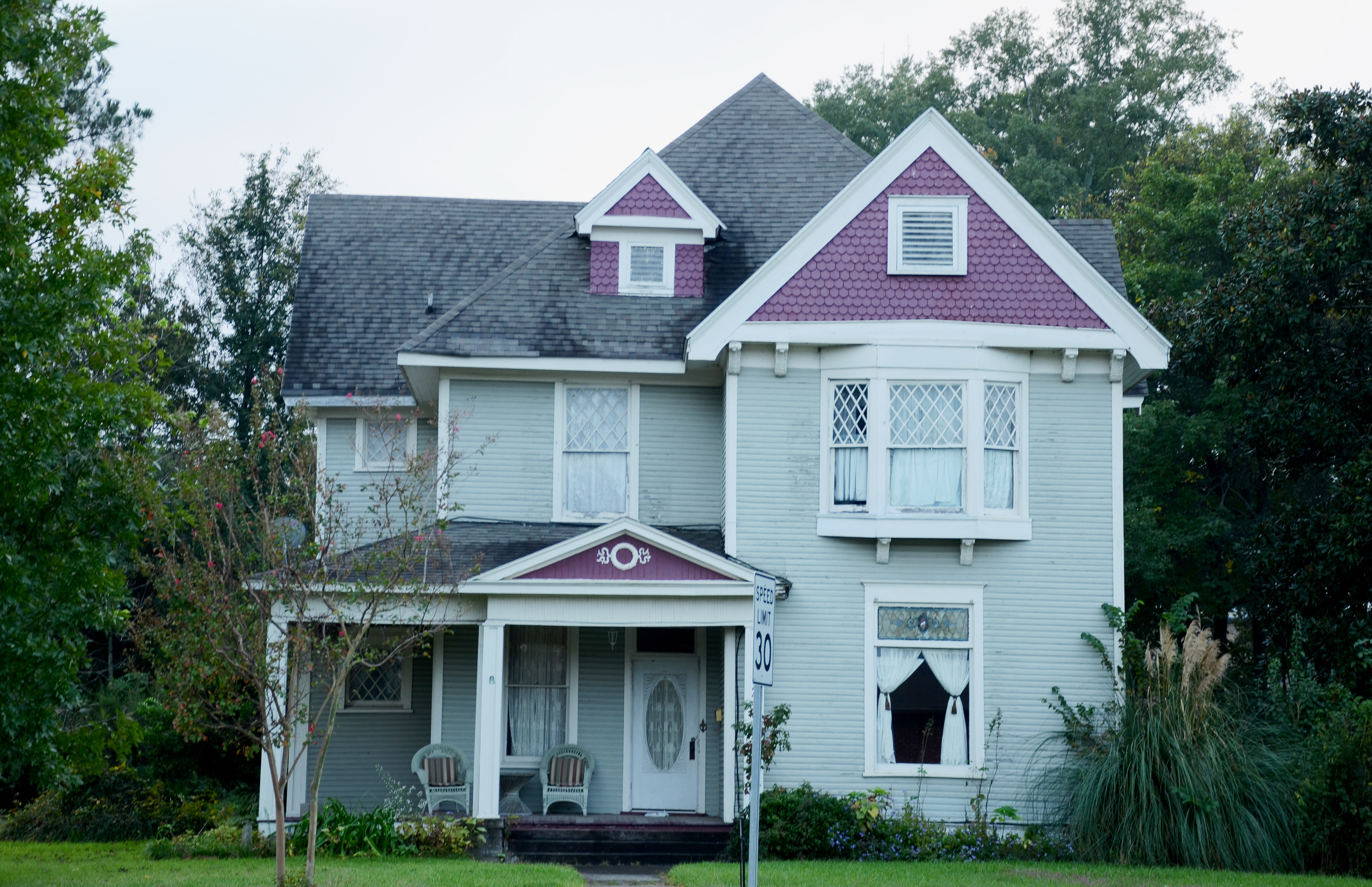

- Location within Arkansas Location within the United States
- Location: 324 E. Main, Prescott, Arkansas
- Coordinates: 33°47′59″N 93°22′41″W
- Area: less than one acre
- Built: 1902
- Built by: Frannk King (woodworker)
- Architect: Charles L. Thompson
- Architectural style: Queen Anne, Colonial Revival
- NRHP reference No.: 98001128
- Added to NRHP: September 3, 1998

The Henry McKenzie House, also known locally as the Dalrymple House, is a historic house at 324 East Main Street in Prescott, Arkansas. The two story wood-frame house was built in 1902 by Henry McKenzie, and is said to have been designed by Charles L. Thompson, although there is no supporting evidence for this claim. The house is one of the best-kept transitional Queen Anne/Colonial Revival houses in Prescott, with decorative shingle siding in its gable ends and diamond-pane windows. Its most significant alteration was the removal of Ionic columns from its porch during renovations in the 1950s which including enclosing the porch.

The house was listed on the National Register of Historic Places in 1998.

== See also ==
- National Register of Historic Places listings in Nevada County, Arkansas
