= Randolph Prim =

American baseball player (1896–1986)

- Pitcher
- Born: November 7, 1896; Prescott, Arkansas
- Died: November 26, 1986 (aged 90); Salina, Kansas
- Batted: Right Threw: Left

Negro league baseball debut
- 1925, for the Kansas City Monarchs

Last Negro league baseball appearance
- 1926, for the Kansas City Monarchs

Teams
- Kansas City Monarchs (1925–1926)

Randolph Prim (November 7, 1896 – November 26, 1986) was a Negro league baseball player with the Kansas City Monarchs.

== Biography ==
Prim was born on November 7, 1896, in Prescott, Arkansas, to Joe and Ida Prim. He moved with his family to Kansas City, Kansas, at an early age.

Prim was a United States Army veteran of the First World War. He joined the Kansas City Monarchs in 1925 when he was 28 years old and played with them for two years. He was their pitcher in 1926.

Prim was a Methodist who became a bricklayer. He joined the Bricklayers Union in Kansas City and he was a 50-year member of his Masonic Lodge.

At the age of 84, Prim moved to Kenwood View Nursing Home in Salina, Kansas. He lived there for six years, dying on November 26, 1986, at the age of 90. He was buried at Gypsum Hill Cemetery in Salina.
