= National Register of Historic Places listings in Nevada County, Arkansas =

Location of Nevada County in Arkansas

This is a list of the National Register of Historic Places listings in Nevada County, Arkansas.

This is intended to be a complete list of the properties and districts on the National Register of Historic Places in Nevada County, Arkansas, United States. The locations of National Register properties and districts for which the latitude and longitude coordinates are included below, may be seen in a map.

There are 19 properties and districts listed on the National Register in the county, including 2 National Historic Landmarks. Another three properties were once listed, but have since been removed.

Contents: Counties in Arkansas
- Arkansas
- Ashley
- Baxter
- Benton
- Boone
- Bradley
- Calhoun
- Carroll
- Chicot
- Clark
- Clay
- Cleburne
- Cleveland
- Columbia
- Conway
- Craighead
- Crawford
- Crittenden
- Cross
- Dallas
- Desha
- Drew
- Faulkner
- Franklin
- Fulton
- Garland
- Grant
- Greene
- Hempstead
- Hot Spring
- Howard
- Independence
- Izard
- Jackson
- Jefferson
- Johnson
- Lafayette
- Lawrence
- Lee
- Lincoln
- Little River
- Logan
- Lonoke
- Madison
- Marion
- Miller
- Mississippi
- Monroe
- Montgomery
- Nevada
- Newton
- Ouachita
- Perry
- Phillips
- Pike
- Poinsett
- Polk
- Pope
- Prairie
- Pulaski (Little Rock)
- Randolph
- St. Francis
- Saline
- Scott
- Searcy
- Sebastian
- Sevier
- Sharp
- Stone
- Union
- Van Buren
- Washington
- White
- Woodruff
- Yell

This National Park Service list is complete through NPS recent listings posted March 6, 2026.

== Current listings ==
	Name on the Register	Image	Date listed	Location	City or town	Description
1	Camden to Washington Road-Rosston Segment	Camden to Washington Road-Rosston Segment	January 29, 2009 (#08001374)	County Road 10; 33°35′30″N 93°10′08″W	Rosston	
2	Carolina Methodist Church	Carolina Methodist Church	January 3, 1991 (#90001947)	County Road 10 east of its junction with Kirk Rd. in the Poison Springs State Forest; 33°35′31″N 93°10′07″W	Rosston	
3	De Ann Cemetery Historic Section	De Ann Cemetery Historic Section	June 1, 2005 (#05000498)	½ mile west of the junction of U.S. Route 371 and Highway 19; 33°48′38″N 93°23′32″W	Prescott	
4	Elkins' Ferry	Elkins' Ferry	April 19, 1994 (#94001182)	Both banks of the Little Missouri River, about 10 miles north of Prescott; 33°56′09″N 93°21′12″W	Prescott	Site of the Civil War Battle of Elkin's Ferry; one of the Camden Expedition Sites, a National Historic Landmark District consisting of sites in several counties; Elkin's Ferry extends into Clark County
5	Emmet Methodist Church	Emmet Methodist Church	September 23, 2009 (#09000742)	209 S. Walnut; 33°43′40″N 93°28′20″W	Emmet	
6	Ephesus Cemetery	Ephesus Cemetery	January 22, 2009 (#08001340)	¼ mile north of Emmet on U.S. Route 67; 33°44′26″N 93°28′02″W	Emmet	
7	Henry McKenzie House	Henry McKenzie House	September 3, 1998 (#98001128)	324 E. Main; 33°47′59″N 93°22′41″W	Prescott	
8	D.L. McRae House	D.L. McRae House	December 22, 1982 (#82000869)	424 E. Main St. 33°47′57″N 93°22′38″W	Prescott	
9	T.C. McRae House		December 22, 1982 (#82000870)	506 E. Elm St. 33°47′52″N 93°22′40″W	Prescott	Demolished
10	Missouri Pacific Depot	Missouri Pacific Depot	November 17, 1978 (#78000614)	300 W. 1st St., N. 33°47′45″N 93°23′22″W	Prescott	
11	Moscow Methodist Church and Cemetery	Moscow Methodist Church and Cemetery	September 20, 2006 (#06000826)	Junction of Highways Highway 23 and Highway 260; 33°46′42″N 93°22′00″W	Prescott	
12	Nevada County Courthouse	Nevada County Courthouse	May 24, 2018 (#100002454)	215 E 2nd St. 33°48′01″N 93°22′52″W	Prescott	
13	Prairie De Ann Battlefield	Prairie De Ann Battlefield	March 22, 1974 (#74000481)	North and south of Highway 24 and southwest of Prescott; 33°49′31″N 93°25′54″W	Prescott	One of the Camden Expedition Sites, a National Historic Landmark consisting of sites in several counties
14	Prescott & Northwestern Railroad Caboose No. 3		September 14, 2020 (#100005585)	403 West 1st St. South; 33°48′02″N 93°23′00″W	Prescott	
15	Prescott City Jail	Prescott City Jail	September 28, 2005 (#05001077)	Alley behind City Hall at 118 W. Elm St. 33°48′15″N 93°22′56″W	Prescott	
16	Prescott City Hall		September 19, 2022 (#100008190)	118 West Elm St. 33°48′08″N 93°22′56″W	Prescott	
17	Prescott Commercial Historic District	Prescott Commercial Historic District	December 24, 2008 (#08000818)	Roughly bounded by E. 3rd St., Walnut St., W. 3rd St., and Pine St. 33°48′06″N 93°22′54″W	Prescott	
18	US 67 Bridge over Little Missouri River	US 67 Bridge over Little Missouri River	January 24, 2007 (#06001271)	U.S. Route 67; 33°52′48″N 93°18′16″W	Prescott	Extends into Clark County
19	Willow Oak Acres Horse Barn		April 27, 2021 (#100006043)	2073 US 371 West; 33°48′39″N 93°26′37″W	Prescott	

== Former listings ==
	Name on the Register	Image	Date listed	Date removed	Location	City or town	Description
1	Allen Tire Company and Gas Station	Allen Tire Company and Gas Station	May 25, 2001 (#01000523)	September 30, 2019	228 1st St., SW. 33°48′05″N 93°22′56″W	Prescott	
2	Bemis Florist Shop		December 22, 1982 (#82000868)	September 17, 1999	117 E. Second	Prescott	
3	Wortham Gymnasium		April 19, 1990 (#90000667)	September 29, 2015	Highway 200; 33°35′55″N 93°14′19″W	Oak Grove	

== See also ==
- List of National Historic Landmarks in Arkansas
- National Register of Historic Places listings in Arkansas
