= Prescott School District (Arkansas) =

School district in Arkansas

Location
- 762 Martin Street; Prescott, Arkansas 71801 United States

District information
- Grades: PK–12
- Established: 1877
- Superintendent: Angie Bryant
- Accreditations: ADE; AdvancED
- Schools: 3
- NCES District ID: 0511820

Students and staff
- Students: 511
- Teachers: 76.25 (on FTE basis)
- Staff: 178.25 (on FTE basis)
- Student–teacher ratio: 13.77
- Athletic conference: 3A Region 6 (football); 3A Region 7 (basketball)
- District mascot: Curely Wolves
- Colors: Maroon; White

Other information
- Website: www.curleywolves.org

Prescott School District is a school district in Prescott, Nevada County, Arkansas, United States. It is one of two school districts in Nevada County and it encompasses 235.89 square miles (611.0 km^{2}) of land. As of the 2014–2015 school year, the district serves more than 1,000 students and employs more than 150 faculty and staff. The District receives Title I funding and offers a Gifted and Talented program, a Special Education program, Advanced Placement, and Distance Learning.

== History ==
In 1877, Prescott School District was founded when voters approved a two and a half mill school tax. In 1880, Thomas Allen donated the block of land between West 2nd, West 3rd, West Elm, and West Vine Streets to the school district and shortly thereafter, a two story frame building was constructed. Prof. G.A. Hayes of Texarkana was elected as the schools first principal.

In 1902, Mr. and Mrs. Thomas C. McRae donated land to the school district for an African American school. From 1924 to 1931, the school held classes for grades 1 through 8. By 1932, classes extended to the tenth grade and in 1939, McRae High School graduated its first twelfth grade student. In 1969, Prescott and McRae Schools were joined through integration and McRae Middle School was named in their honor.

In the early 1950s, Thomas Allen Elementary, Jr. High and High School were moved to a larger property that is located on Martin Street, southeast of downtown Prescott. The new campus allowed consolidation of facilities and room for expansion. New Elementary, Middle, and High School buildings were constructed, a football stadium and a new gymnasium were added, and the new facilities were named after the City of Prescott.

Due to its rural setting, Prescott's athletic participants were originally known as the 'Aggie's', but since 1933, the district and its schools have employed the unique mascot and athletic name of the Curley Wolves.

The name originated from an Arkansas Gazette reporter asking Little Rock High School coach Earl Quigley what he thought of the 1933 Prescott football team after they upset the larger Little Rock 'Tigers' team. The phrase "Curley Wolves" was quickly adopted by student body assembly the following day.

== Schools ==
Prescott School District includes the following three school facilities:

- Prescott High School, serving students in grades 9 through 12.
- Prescott Junior High School, serving students in grades 5 through 8.
- Prescott Elementary School, serving students in prekindergarten through grade 4.

== Former schools ==
- Thomas Allen High School
- Thomas Allen Middle School
- Thomas Allen Elementary
- McRae High School
- McRae Elementary
- Prescott Jr. High School
- Park Elementary
