= Carolina Methodist Church =

Historic church in Arkansas, United States

- U.S. National Register of Historic Places
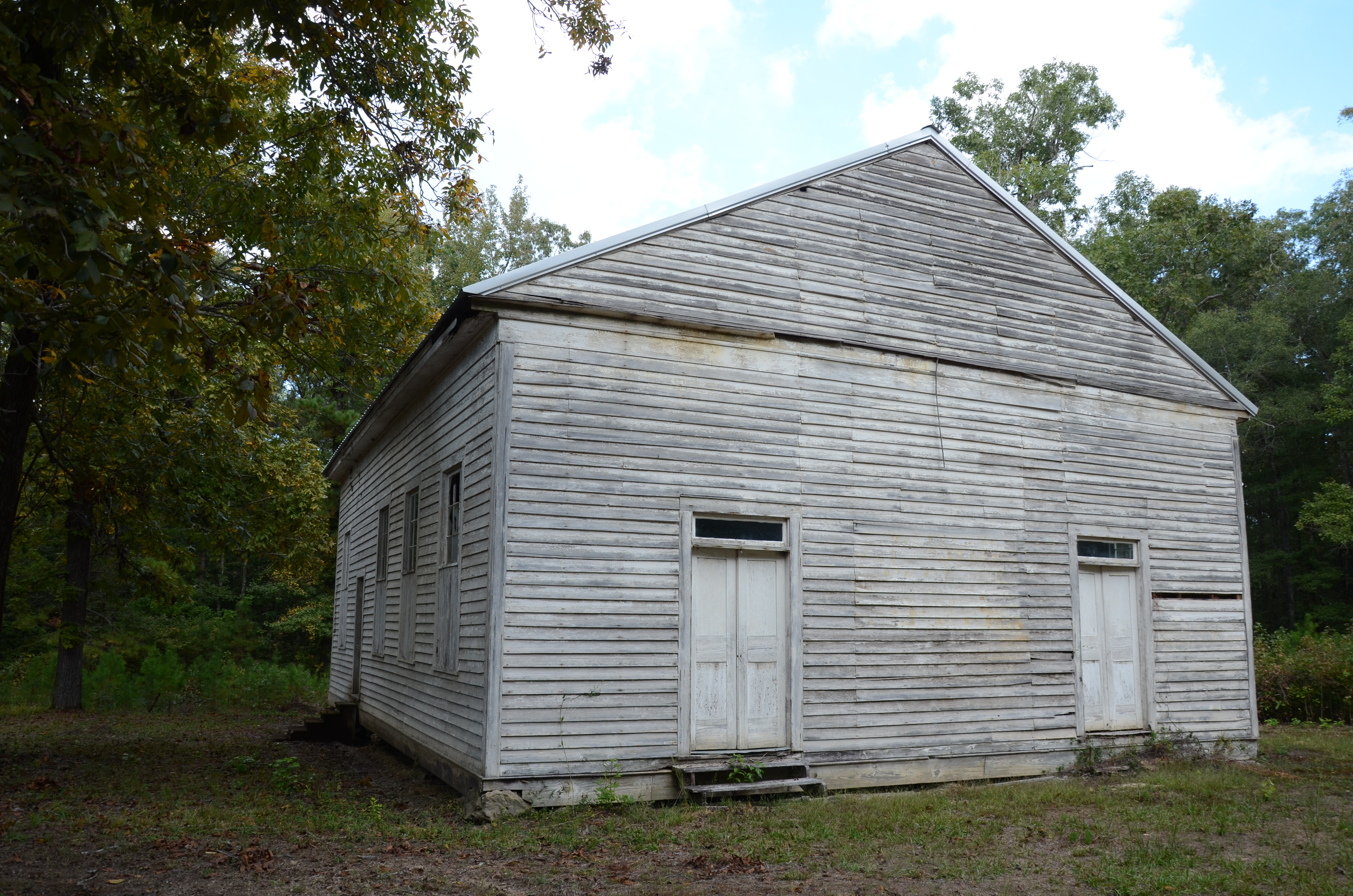
- Carolina Methodist Church, October 2016

- Location within Arkansas Location within the United States
- Nearest city: Rosston, Arkansas
- Coordinates: 33°35′31″N 93°10′7″W
- Area: less than one acre
- Built: 1871
- Architectural style: Greek Revival
- NRHP reference No.: 90001947
- Added to NRHP: January 3, 1991

The Carolina Methodist Church is a historic church in rural Nevada County, Arkansas, United States, about 5 miles (8.0 km) east of Rosston, that is listed on the National Register of Historic Places.

== Description ==
The simple gable-roofed wood-frame church is located in Poison Spring State Forest, along an old section of the historic post road between Camden and Washington, east of the junction of County Roads 10 and 47. It is a remnant of the community of Carolina, which was settled in 1855; regular services were discontinued in 1977.

The church was listed on the National Register of Historic Places] January 3, 1991.

== See also ==
- National Register of Historic Places listings in Nevada County, Arkansas
