= USS Uvalde =

Cargo ship of the United States Navy

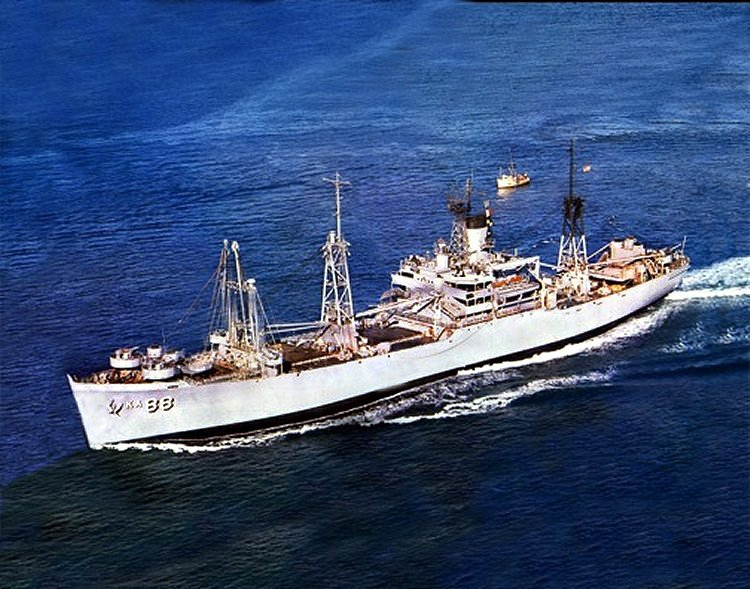
- Uvalde in 1954

History

United States
- Name: USS Uvalde
- Namesake: Uvalde County, Texas
- Builder: Moore Dry Dock Company, Oakland, California
- Laid down: 27 March 1944
- Launched: 20 May 1944
- Commissioned: 18 August 1944
- Decommissioned: 1957
- Stricken: 1 July 1960
- Reinstated: 1 September 1961
- Recommissioned: 18 November 1961
- Decommissioned: 1 December 1968
- Stricken: 1 December 1968
- Honours and awards: 3 battle stars (World War II); 3 battle stars (Korea)
- Fate: Sold for scrap, 1969

General characteristics
- Class & type: Andromeda-class attack cargo ship
- Type: Type C2-S-B1
- Displacement: 13,910 long tons (14,133 t) full
- Length: 459 ft 3 in (139.98 m)
- Beam: 63 ft (19 m)
- Draft: 26 ft 4 in (8.03 m)
- Speed: 16.5 knots (30.6 km/h; 19.0 mph)
- Complement: 366
- Armament: 1 × 5"/38 caliber gun mount; 4 × twin 40 mm gun mounts; 16 × 20 mm gun mounts

USS Uvalde (AKA-88) was an Andromeda-class attack cargo ship in service with the United States Navy from 1944 to 1957 and from 1961 to 1968. She was scrapped in 1969.

== History ==
Uvalde (AKA-88) (formerly projected as the merchant freighter Wild Pigeon) was named after Uvalde County, Texas, the home of former Vice President John Nance "Cactus Jack" Garner. She was laid down under a Maritime Commission contract (MC hull 1188) on 27 March 1944 at Oakland, California, by the Moore Dry Dock Co.; launched on 20 May 1944; sponsored by Mrs. George J. Kean; and commissioned on 18 August 1944.

=== World War II, 1944–1945 ===
After fitting out at Oakland, Uvalde ran her trials before departing San Francisco Bay on 29 August, bound for San Pedro, California She conducted extensive shakedown training out of that port before she shifted to San Diego, there to train in amphibious warfare from 15 through 30 September in company with the attack transport Appling (APA-58).

In yard hands at Terminal Island, California, for post-shakedown availability until 10 October, Uvalde got underway and churned out of Los Angeles harbor, bound for San Francisco. Uvalde subsequently loaded cargo at that port from 11 through 19 October.

==== The destruction of Mount Hood ====
Departing "Frisco" on 20 October, Uvalde reached Manus, in the Admiralty Islands, on 6 November. Over the next few days, the ship lay at anchor in Seeadler Harbor, Manus, awaiting orders for onward routing. While there, she witnessed the explosion of the ammunition ship Mount Hood (AE-11) at 0820 on 11 November. Fortunately at a distance far enough away to be unaffected by the blast, Uvalde responded to the emergency by sending medical assistance and supplies to some of the other ships closer to where the ill-fated ammunition ship had been anchored — ships that had taken heavy casualties when shrapnel from the atomized Mount Hood had ripped into them.

Subsequently, three days after the Mount Hood tragedy, Uvalde got underway to unload cargo at East Murzim Dock. Completing that evolution a little over a week later, on the 21st, Uvalde got underway for New Guinea on the 29th, reaching Milne Bay, her destination, on 3 December. The attack cargo ship then took on board 100 tons of miscellaneous cargo earmarked for the 489th Port Battalion, Transportation Corps, 6th Army. She shifted to Oro Bay, New Guinea, within a few days, there loading additional cargo — 1,025 tons of vehicles, gasoline, and organizational equipment for the 6th Army. On 21 December, Uvalde and her escort, J. Douglas Blackwood (DE-219) got underway for the Admiralties, reaching their destination the following day.

==== Philippines campaign ====
Uvalde spent Christmas at Manus before she got underway on her first "mission of war" as part of Task Group (TG) 77.9 on 2 January 1945, shaping course for the island of Luzon. The attack cargo ship subsequently entered Lingayen Gulf on the morning of 11 January and, at 0925, sent her first wave of landing craft onto the beaches. During her ensuing stay at Lingayen Gulf, Uvalde's sailors witnessed their first attacks by the Japanese kamikazes on ships in the vicinity.

On the 13th, Uvalde weighed anchor, shifting to Leyte and reaching there on the 16th. Two days later, the attack cargo ship got underway again, this time headed for the Schouten Islands. Bound for Biak, Uvalde reached her destination on the 23rd and commenced loading cargo at dock number 2 soon thereafter.

Completing loading on 2 February, Uvalde returned to Leyte, joining formation with TG 78.5 on the following day. Subsequently, anchoring in Leyte Gulf on the 6th, the attack cargo ship pushed on for Mindoro the following day, arriving on the 9th. Twenty-seven hours later, the ship completed the unloading evolution, receiving a "well done" from Capt. R. W. Abbott, the officer in tactical command of the task group.

Uvalde returned to Leyte and, over the days that ensued, prepared for her next operation. For six weeks, the attack cargo ship participated in the practice evolutions that ultimately led up to the final big assault landing of the war in the Pacific — the invasion of Okinawa in the Ryūkyūs.

==== Okinawa campaign ====
Underway on 27 March, Uvalde reached the assault areas on 1 April, the day of the initial landings. By noon of that day – Easter Sunday – the loading operations were proceeding apace. At 0559 on 2 April, Uvalde's gunners drew their first blood, downing a suicide aircraft making a run on the nearby attack transport USS Latimer (APA-152). Uvalde received official credit for the kill — she soon sported a miniature Japanese flag on her bridge.

Off Okinawa from 1 April to 9 April, Uvalde spent much of her time at general quarters due to the heavy Japanese aerial resistance. The attack cargo ship subsequently weighed anchor on the 9th and headed to Saipan in the Marianas, en route to her ultimate destination.

==== The end of the war ====
After provisioning ship at Pearl Harbor, Uvalde returned to the western Pacific, departing the Hawaiian Islands on 10 May. Reaching Eniwetok in the Marshalls 10 days later, the attack cargo ship got underway for Guam in the Marianas after exchanging cargo and embarking passengers. Uvalde then discharged and unloaded at Guam before she proceeded for the west coast of the United States on 27 June, her course shaped for San Francisco. Uvalde arrived at the Golden Gate on 12 July, en route to Everett, Washington, for a drydocking and repairs. Reaching Everett on the 16th, the ship underwent nearly two weeks of repair work there, completing her assigned availability on 28 July.

Departing the Pacific Northwest on 1 August, Uvalde proceeded to San Francisco to load cargo in preparation for her return to the western Pacific theater of operations. Completing the loading process on 11 August, the attack cargo ship got underway for the Hawaiian Islands on the 12th. She was at sea when at 1400 on 14 August 1945, President Harry S. Truman announced in a radio broadcast address that a state of war no longer existed between the United States and Japan. World War II was over at last.

=== Post-war operations, 1944–1950 ===
For Uvalde, the war had been a short one, but there still remained the duty of returning the many soldiers, sailors, marines, and airmen home from the fighting fronts. The attack cargo ship took part in those operations well into 1946, also earning the Navy's Occupation Service Medal for operations in Chinese waters in ensuing months.

=== Korean War, 1950–1953 ===
Up until mid-1950, Uvalde transported troops and cargo to American outposts in Asia, supporting the United States presence in that area of the world Uvalde participated in the United Nations efforts to stem North Korean aggression after that nation invaded neighboring South Korea in June 1950, deploying to Korean waters with troops and cargo on numerous occasions.

New Year's Day 1951 found Uvalde at Sasebo, Japan – nine days later she got underway, bound for the west coast of the United States, and she reached her destination two weeks later on the 24th. Shifting to the Mare Island Naval Shipyard for repairs and alterations on the 30th, the attack cargo ship remained in yard hands until early April, when she shifted to San Diego to conduct underway training evolutions.

After three weeks of post-repair training, Uvalde shifted to the naval supply center at Oakland, California, when she loaded cargo earmarked for the Far East. The attack cargo ship subsequently made three round-trip voyages, touching at Sasebo and Yokosuka in the west and Oakland in the east over the remainder of 1951.

Uvalde spent much of 1952 engaged in the same shuttle operations that had kept her occupied since the onset of the Korean War. She visited Korean waters in the latter half of the month of March 1952, touching at Sokcho Ri and Paengyong Do before resuming her west coast-to-Japan shuttle voyages with her termini at Oakland, Sasebo, and Yokosuka. During August 1952, the ship made a short recreational stop at Pearl Harbor.

During the late autumn of 1952, Uvalde remained in Japanese waters, undergoing a drydocking at Yokosuka in late November before she sailed for Oakland on the 23rd of that month. Reaching Treasure Island, San Francisco, on 8 December, the attack cargo ship went into the naval shipyard at Mare Island three days later.

Uvalde overhauled at Mare Island into mid-February, 1953, after which time she conducted the usual under way training evolutions before resuming west coast-to-Japan shuttle voyages. She called at Korean ports once, visiting Pohang in May 1953, spending most of her time in Japanese waters. Ports included during that cruise included Sasebo, Yokosuka, and Nagasaki.

=== Pacific Fleet, 1954–1957 ===
February through July of the following year, 1954, was spent in shuttle service between the Naval Supply Center, Oakland, and the Far East, with a recreational visit to Nagasaki in April. During July, the ship arrived at Yokosuka and, after a trip to Sasebo and return, loaded a cargo of rice and medical supplies, setting sail for French Indochina to assist in "Operation Passage to Freedom."

Uvalde reached Tourane Bay, French Indochina, on 28 August and remained there, supporting "Passage to Freedom" operations until 10 September, when she got underway to return to Oakland. Over the next few years, Uvalde's routine would remain much the same, sailing back and forth across the Pacific on the supply line from the west coast of the United States to American military bases in the Far East.

=== Reserve and reinstatement, 1957–1961 ===
Mothballed in 1957, and becoming a part of the Reserve Fleet, Uvalde was struck from the Navy List on 1 July 1960, but was reinstated on 1 September 1961, because of the Berlin Crisis. Uvalde was recommissioned on 18 November 1961.

=== Atlantic Fleet, 1957–1962 ===
Ordered to duty with the Atlantic Fleet, the attack cargo ship — with a new lease on life — got underway for Guantanamo Bay, Cuba, and five weeks of training in December. After a voyage that had taken her via Mazatlán, Mexico; the Panama Canal; and Guantanamo (where she engaged in refresher training operations as scheduled), Uvalde reached her new assigned home port, Norfolk, Virginia, in February 1962. She thus became a part of the Amphibious Force of the Atlantic Fleet.

After a post-shakedown overhaul, Uvalde took part in amphibious exercises at Vieques, Puerto Rico (Lant-PhibLex 1-62) in April — her first major exercise since recommissioning. By the end of the year 1962, the veteran attack cargo vessel had deployed on various 2nd Fleet exercises and maneuvers in the western Atlantic and Caribbean areas. Attached to Amphibious Squadron (PhibRon) 10 from 22 October to 5 December, Uvalde supported the Fleet during the Cuban Missile Crisis, when President John F. Kennedy "quarantined" Cuba over the presence of offensive Soviet missiles on that strategic isle.

=== Mediterranean, 1963–1968 ===
Subsequently, Uvalde spent all of January 1963, engaged in pre-deployment upkeep. She sailed on 4 February, shaping course for the Mediterranean, and operated with the 6th Fleet through mid-May, touching at Naples, Italy; Athens, Greece; İzmir, Turkey; Rhodes, Greece; Golfe Juan, France; and Barcelona, Spain; during the course of her operations.

After returning to Norfolk for upkeep and independent ship exercises, Uvalde deployed to the Caribbean as part of the Amphibious Ready Squadron, calling at San Juan, Puerto Rico, during that cruise that carried over into late February 1964 as part of PhibRon 8. She deployed again to the Caribbean from late June to late September 1965, before she later participated in Exercise "Steel Pike I", during the latter cruise, she visited Gran Canaria, Tenerife, in the Canary Islands.

Returning to her home port, Norfolk, in late November, Uvalde shifted to the New York Naval Shipyard, Brooklyn, New York, on 7 January. She remained there, undergoing repairs and alterations, until 28 April, after which time she headed south, ultimately conducting refresher training in Guantanamo Bay.

In late June, Uvalde supported the American intervention in the Dominican Republic, serving as "bulk fuel control ship" between 18 June and 28 June. The ship then conducted independent exercises and underwent some needed upkeep through mid-July.

Uvalde subsequently trained out of Little Creek, Virginia, for 10 days in July before resuming scheduled independent ship exercises and upkeep periods out of, and at, Norfolk. That autumn, she deployed to the Mediterranean for the second time as a unit of PhibRon 10. During that cruise — lasting into mid-March 1966 — Uvalde operated with Task Force 61, visiting Marseille and Toulon, France; Malta; Naples, Genoa, and Livorno, Italy; Barcelona and Mazarron, Spain; and Porto Scudo and Santa Manza, Corsica.

Reaching the end of the deployment, Uvalde left Palma, Mallorca, in her wake on 17 March, bound for Rota, Spain, the turnover point, where she would be relieved of her duties with the 6th Fleet. She then began her homeward-bound voyage on 20 March, setting course for Morehead City, North Carolina.

Midway across the Atlantic, Uvalde picked up distress signals from a Danish merchantman, the refrigerator ship SS Chilean Reefer. One of the freighter's crewmen was desperately ill and needed prompt medical attention — care that the ship was apparently unable to supply. Uvalde immediately reversed course and sped to her assistance. The attack cargo ship took on board the patient, transferring him from Chilean Reefer in an LCM, where treatment commenced as soon as he came on board. The sailor remained on board to return to a hospital in the United States for treatment.

Uvalde ultimately reached Morehead City and there disembarked her detachment of marines and off-loaded their equipment. Uvalde's crew, eager to continue on the homeward-bound leg of their voyage after the six-month Mediterranean cruise, worked all night to unload the ship so that the ship could sail the next morning, as soon as possible. Uvalde reached her home port, Norfolk, on 3 April 1966. As her commanding officer wrote in retrospect: "It was a good deployment, but it was even better to be back home again."

The attack cargo ship subsequently deployed to the Mediterranean two more times in her career, from April to August 1967 and again during the summer of 1968, returning to Morehead City, N.C., on 14 September and Norfolk the following day. She remained on active operations with the Atlantic Fleet into 1968.

=== Decommissioning and sale ===
Ultimately declared "unfit for further service", and replaced by a Charleston-class amphibious cargo ship, with significant increases in combat vehicle and cargo stowage and better combat characteristics, Uvalde was decommissioned and struck from the Navy List on 1 December 1968. Transferred to the Maritime Administration on 26 June 1969 for disposal, Uvalde's hulk was simultaneously sold to Levin Metals Corp., of San Jose, California, and scrapped.

== Awards ==
Uvalde earned one battle star for her World War II service and three for the Korean War. The anchor and bell of the USS Uvalde are displayed in Uvalde, Texas.
