= Prescott, Arkansas =

City in Arkansas, United States

- City
- Location of Prescott in Nevada County, Arkansas.
- Coordinates: 33°48′09″N 93°22′55″W
- Country: United States
- State: Arkansas
- County: Nevada
- Established: 1873

Area
  - Total: 6.46 sq mi (16.74 km^{2})
  - Land: 6.42 sq mi (16.63 km^{2})
  - Water: 0.046 sq mi (0.12 km^{2})
- Elevation: 325 ft (99 m)

Population (2020)
  - Total: 3,101
  - Estimate (2025): 2,949 ▼
  - Density: 483.1/sq mi (186.52/km^{2})
- Time zone: UTC-6 (Central (CST))
  - Summer (DST): UTC-5 (CDT)
- ZIP code: 71857
- Area code: 870
- FIPS code: 05-57260
- GNIS feature ID: 2404569
- Website: www.prescottar.com

Prescott is a city in and the county seat of Nevada County, Arkansas, United States. As of the 2020 census, Prescott had a population of 3,101. Prescott is part of the Hope Micropolitan Statistical Area.

Located 100 miles southwest of Little Rock, Prescott was developed on the Prairie D'Âne, named by French colonists before the United States acquired this area. The prairie consisted of approximately 25–30 square miles of rolling open land, surrounded by forest. The area had been a well-known crossroads prior to construction of the Cairo & Fulton Railroad. To the west lies the city of Washington, to the east lies the city of Camden, while to the south lies the Red River, with Shreveport, Texarkana, and Dallas beyond.

As of 2014, Prescott and Nevada County had sixteen properties listed on the National Register of Historic Places. Elkin's Ferry Battleground and the Prairie D'Ane Battlefield are further recognized as National Historic Landmarks within a National Historic Landmark District.

== History ==
The city of Prescott was not platted until 1873 during Reconstruction. It was to be a station stop for the Cairo & Fulton Railroad then under construction. The railroad was constructed parallel to the Southwest Trail through northern Nevada County. Prescott was incorporated on October 6, 1874.

The original town site consisted of 48 blocks, 24 on each side of the railroad. The streets were platted in a grid pattern from the railroad line. Streets running east–west use the railroad as a dividing line between their eastern and western halves, and streets running north–south use Main Street as a dividing line between their northern and southern halves.

Prescott grew quickly because the railroad provided a reliable way to transport local products to larger markets. The first post office opened in November 1873, and the first newspaper, The Banner, was established in 1875. The Nevada County seat was moved to Prescott in 1877, which contributed to the town's commercial importance. It became a center of law and government in the county. By the late 1890s, Prescott had its own telephone system and water and light plant.

The timber industry became important to the region's early economy when in 1890, James H. Bemis & Benjamin Whitaker built the Ozan Lumber Company plant in Prescott. That same year, Dr. R. L. Powers began constructing the Prescott & Northwestern Railroad. It transported lumber, peaches, cotton and other products. It also provided passenger service, connecting adjacent communities to the Missouri Pacific Railroad Depot in Prescott.

Historians have speculated on the naming of Prescott: whether it was named after William Hickling Prescott, of Salem, Massachusetts, who was a friend of Cairo & Fulton Railroad officials Thomas Allen and Henry Marquand, or where it was named after the County Surveyor, W. H. Prescott.

== Geography ==
Prescott is located on south-southwest section of Prairie D'Âne. The large open prairie was named by French colonists and is located in the Arkansas Timberlands region of the Ark-La-Tex. Prescott is situated in the Gulf Coastal Plain, near the Little Missouri River. This waterway provides Prescott with drinking water and recreational opportunities.

According to the United States Census Bureau, the city has a total area of 6.5 square miles (17 km^{2}), of which 6.5 square miles (17 km^{2}) is land and 0.15% is water.

=== Climate ===
The climate in Prescott is characterized by hot, humid summers and generally mild to cool winters. According to the Köppen Climate Classification system, Prescott has a humid subtropical climate, abbreviated "Cfa" on climate maps.

Climate data for Prescott, AR
Month	Jan	Feb	Mar	Apr	May	Jun	Jul	Aug	Sep	Oct	Nov	Dec	Year
Record high °F (°C)	83 (28)	88 (31)	93 (34)	94 (34)	100 (38)	108 (42)	112 (44)	112 (44)	110 (43)	102 (39)	87 (31)	81 (27)	97.50 (36.39)
Mean daily maximum °F (°C)	51 (11)	58 (14)	67 (19)	75 (24)	82 (28)	88 (31)	92 (33)	92 (33)	85 (29)	76 (24)	63 (17)	54 (12)	73.58 (23.10)
Mean daily minimum °F (°C)	30 (−1)	34 (1)	42 (6)	49 (9)	59 (15)	67 (19)	70 (21)	69 (21)	63 (17)	51 (11)	40 (4)	33 (1)	50.58 (10.32)
Record low °F (°C)	−4 (−20)	−1 (−18)	11 (−12)	28 (−2)	36 (2)	50 (10)	55 (13)	52 (11)	36 (2)	27 (−3)	13 (−11)	0 (−18)	25.25 (−3.75)
Average precipitation inches (mm)	4.24 (108)	4.05 (103)	5.04 (128)	4.97 (126)	5.15 (131)	4.69 (119)	4.27 (108)	3.13 (80)	4.34 (110)	5.00 (127)	5.90 (150)	5.55 (141)	56.33 (1,431)
Average snowfall inches (cm)	2.30 (5.8)	1.70 (4.3)	0.30 (0.76)	0 (0)	0 (0)	0 (0)	0 (0)	0 (0)	0 (0)	0 (0)	0 (0)	1.00 (2.5)	5.3 (13.36)
Source: intellicast.com

== Demographics ==
Historical population
Census	Pop.	Note	%±
1880	1,253		—
1890	1,287		2.7%
1900	2,005		55.8%
1910	2,705		34.9%
1920	2,691		−0.5%
1930	3,033		12.7%
1940	3,177		4.7%
1950	3,960		24.6%
1960	3,533		−10.8%
1970	3,921		11.0%
1980	4,103		4.6%
1990	3,673		−10.5%
2000	3,686		0.4%
2010	3,296		−10.6%
2020	3,101		−5.9%
2025 (est.)	2,949	▼	−4.9%
U.S. Decennial Census

=== 2020 census ===
Prescott racial composition
Race	Num.	Perc.
White (non-Hispanic)	1,258	40.57%
Black or African American (non-Hispanic)	1,544	49.79%
Native American	13	0.42%
Asian	10	0.32%
Other/Mixed	108	3.48%
Hispanic or Latino	168	5.42%

As of the 2020 census, there were 3,101 people, 1,212 households, and 804 families residing in the city.

The median age was 41.5 years. 24.0% of residents were under the age of 18 and 18.5% of residents were 65 years of age or older. For every 100 females there were 89.9 males, and for every 100 females age 18 and over there were 82.9 males age 18 and over.

0.0% of residents lived in urban areas, while 100.0% lived in rural areas.

Of all households, 32.8% had children under the age of 18 living in them. 32.1% were married-couple households, 20.5% were households with a male householder and no spouse or partner present, and 41.7% were households with a female householder and no spouse or partner present. About 34.5% of all households were made up of individuals and 13.4% had someone living alone who was 65 years of age or older.

There were 1,532 housing units, of which 21.3% were vacant. The homeowner vacancy rate was 2.1% and the rental vacancy rate was 12.2%.

=== 2000 census ===
As of the census of 2000, there were 3,686 people, 1,421 households, and 912 families residing in the city. The population density was 564.9 inhabitants per square mile (218.1/km^{2}). There were 1,643 housing units at an average density of 251.8 per square mile (97.2/km^{2}). The racial makeup of the city was 53.31% White, 44.49% Black or African American, 0.38% Native American, 0.08% Asian, 1.17% from other races, and 0.57% from two or more races. 1.76% of the population were Hispanic or Latino of any race.

There were 1,421 households, out of which 32.1% had children under the age of 18 living with them, 41.6% were married couples living together, 19.5% had a female householder with no husband present, and 35.8% were non-families. 33.6% of all households were made up of individuals, and 18.4% had someone living alone who was 65 years of age or older. The average household size was 2.39 and the average family size was 3.05.

In the city, the population was spread out, with 25.7% under the age of 18, 8.5% from 18 to 24, 26.7% from 25 to 44, 20.3% from 45 to 64, and 18.7% who were 65 years of age or older. The median age was 37 years. For every 100 females, there were 85.7 males. For every 100 females age 18 and over, there were 79.5 males.

The median income for a household in the city was $21,612, and the median income for a family was $28,665. Males had a median income of $27,384 versus $17,289 for females. The per capita income for the city was $11,515. About 27.5% of families and 32.5% of the population were below the poverty line, including 38.7% of those under age 18 and 39.6% of those age 65 or over.

== Arts and culture ==
=== Annual events ===
The Fall Festival and Trade Days showcases games, activities and numerous entertainment and sports events. These include a 5K run/walk, arts & crafts booths, a BQ cook-off, balloon liftoff, beauty pageant, bunco tournament, co-ed softball tournament, dessert contest, dunking booth, face painting, food vendors, a great pumpkin treasure hunt, pet costume contest, pie eating contest, sidewalk sales, and the Tyson/Calvin Brown basketball tournament.

=== Libraries ===
The Prescott/Nevada County Library was completed on November 4, 2003. It is located in downtown Prescott, and is administered by the Southwest Arkansas Regional Library System.

=== Museums ===
The Nevada County Depot & Museum is the depot building was designed by Missouri Pacific Railroad architect E. M. Tucker, who also designed railway stations in Little Rock and Texarkana. It was constructed in 1912 and houses permanent exhibits on the Civil War Battles, Railroads, and general history of Prescott and Nevada County. The museum also houses an area archive that is open to researchers.

== Education ==
=== Public Schools ===
Prescott's public school system was founded in 1877. Public education for elementary and secondary school students is provided by the Prescott School District, which leads to graduation from Prescott High School. As of the 2015–2016 school year, the district serves more than 1,000 students and employs more than 175 faculty and staff.

Prescott School District includes the following three school facilities:

- Prescott High School, serving students in grades 9 through 12.
- Prescott Junior High School, serving students in grades 5 and 8.
- Prescott Elementary School, serving students in prekindergarten through grade 4.

== Transportation ==
=== Air ===
- Kizer Field, (4F7) on the eastern edge of the city. Andrew Grantham Helgaford.

=== Rail ===
- Missouri Pacific Railroad
- Prescott & Northwestern Railroad

=== Highways ===
- Interstate 30
- U.S. Highway 67
- U.S. Highway 371
- Arkansas Highway 332
- Arkansas Highway 24
- Arkansas Highway 19

== Media ==
=== Radio ===
- 1370 AM KTPA – "The talk of South Arkansas."
- Social Media-News
- SWARK.Today (Southwest Arkansas), Hope-Prescott

== Notable people ==
- Kirby Allan (Pittman), born 1928, in Prescott, record producer.
- Frederick W. Allsopp - author. Allsopp Park, in Little Rock, was named in his honor.
- Grady Gammage - (born 1892, Prescott) - Arizonan educator, president of Northern Arizona University and Arizona State University. Gammage Auditorium in Tempe, Arizona was named in his honor.
- Walt Goldsby - MLB outfielder, St. Louis Browns, Washington Nationals, Richmond Virginians, Baltimore Orioles.
- Oren Harris - US Representative and United States District Court judge.
- Jerry Louis Latin - (born 1953, Prescott) - NFL running back, St. Louis Cardinals and St. Louis Rams.
- Ira E. McMillian - (born 1908, Prescott) - U.S. Navy Rear Admiral and Navy Cross recipient.
- Thomas Chipman McRae - Arkansas Representative, Governor, US Representative, US Congress.
- Jim Moore (baseball) - (born 1903, Prescott) - MLB pitcher, Cleveland Indians and Chicago White Sox.
- John C. Munn - (born 1906, Prescott) - Assistant Commandant of the Marine Corps.
- Anita Pointer - entertainer, The Pointer Sisters.
- Charles Randolph Prim - (born 1896, Prescott) - NLB pitcher, Kansas City Monarchs.
- Floyd Robinson - (born 1936, Prescott) - MLB outfielder, Chicago White Sox, Cincinnati Reds, Oakland Athletics, and Boston Red Sox.
- Mike Ross (politician) - Arkansas Senate, US Representative and Democratic nominee for governor in 2014. (Arkansas's 4th congressional district)
- John Shackelford - NLB outfielder, Cleveland Browns, Harrisburg Giants, Chicago American Giants, and Birmingham Black Barons.
- Paul Silas - (born 1943, Prescott) - NBA player and head coach.
- Ulysses "Slow Kid" Thompson - (born 1888, Prescott) - Vaudeville entertainer and promoter.
- Chuck Tompkins - (born 1889, Prescott) - MLB pitcher, Cincinnati Reds.
- Daniel Eugene "Danny" Walters - (born 1960, Prescott) - NFL cornerback, San Diego Chargers.

== Points of interest ==
- Carolina Methodist Church - (Private) A one-story wood frame rectangular ecclesiastical building that is an excellent example of early vernacular Greek Revival style architecture.
- De Ann Cemetery - Final resting place for early settlers of Prescott and Nevada County.
- Elkin's Ferry Battleground - National Historic Landmark of the Civil War.
- Moscow Methodist Church and Cemetery - (Private) Original area of local settlement and commerce prior to construction of the Cairo and Fulton Railroad.
- Historic Washington State Park - Located 25 miles southwest of Prescott, the park offers visitors guided tours which interpret the history of this pioneer settlement, originally located on the Southwest Trail. The park hosts Civil War reenactments, the annual Jonquil Festival, and a Christmas Festival.
- Prairie D'Ane Battlefield - National Historic Landmark of the Civil War.
- Prescott Commercial Historic District - Downtown Area of unique Architecture and Commerce.
- Prescott Raceway – Offers 1/4-mile drag racing.
- Sterling Square Park – Includes brick sidewalks with memorial pavers, benches, and a fountain. A mural illustrates historic scenes from the area.
- White Oak Lake State Park and Poison Springs Battleground State Park - Located 22 miles east of Prescott, the parks include campsites, pavilions, picnic sites, trails, playgrounds, and a visitor center with exhibits and interactive programs. The parks are an interpretation gateway to the Camden Expedition, and the Red River Campaign.
