= 1926 Arkansas state highway numbering =

Highway renumbering

- 1926 era Highway markers for AR 12 and AR 112

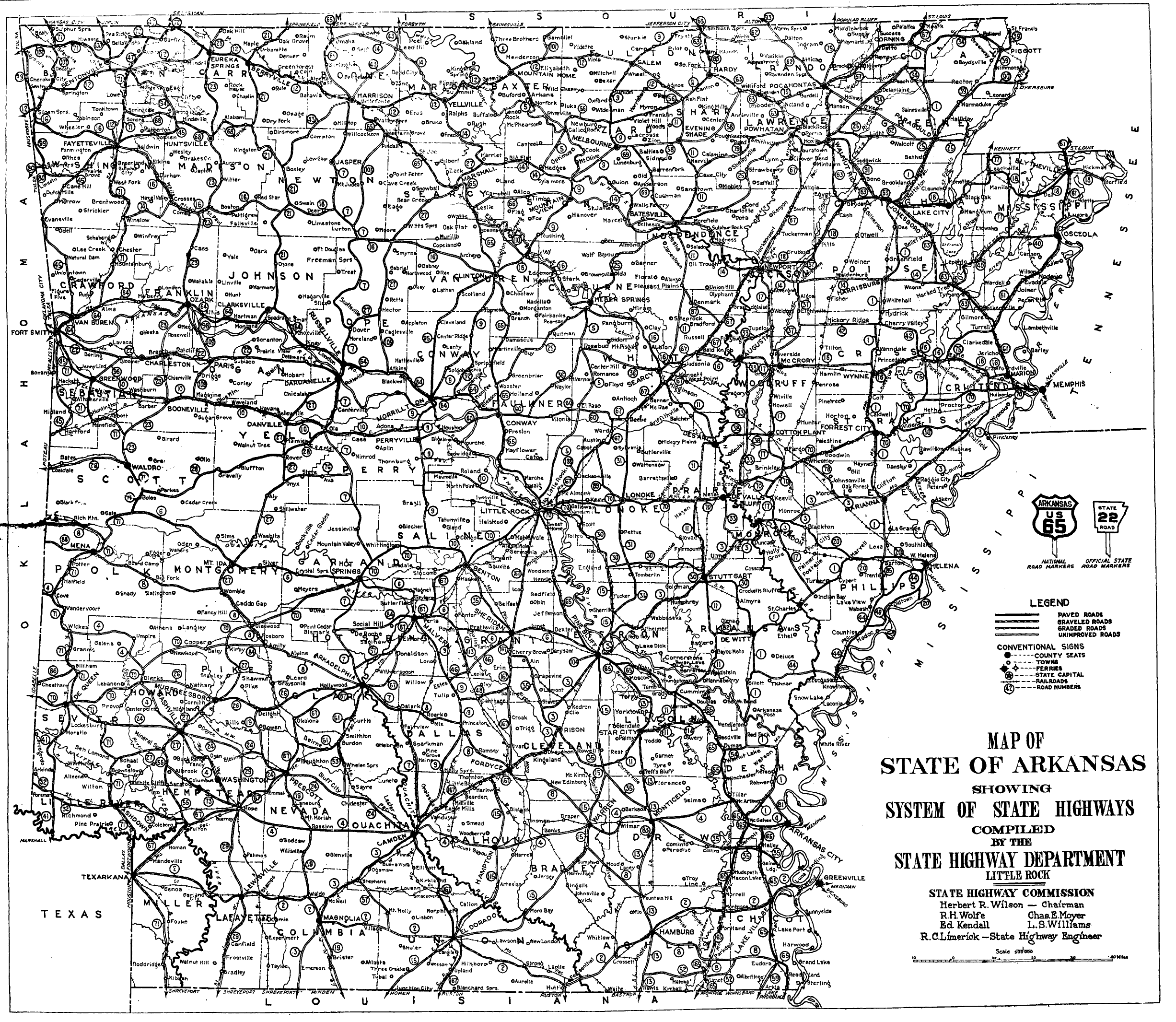
- A map of highways in the state of Arkansas, 1926

System information
- Formed: 1926

Highway names
- US Highways: National Road nn
- State: State Road nn

System links
- Arkansas Highway System; Interstate; US; State; Business; Spurs; Suffixed; Scenic; Heritage

In 1926, the U.S. state of Arkansas renumbered its highways into a more traditional format. The system to be replaced was established in 1924 as Arkansas' first comprehensive highway plan. Roads were designated as "primary federal aid roads", "secondary federal aid roads", or "connecting state roads". The Arkansas State Highway Commission implemented the system of United States Numbered Highways also around 1926, and thus Arkansas decided to number its highways and to drop the 1924 letter-number format. This resulted in the first true numbering of state highways in Arkansas. The U.S. route designations 61, 63, 64, 65, 67, 70, 71, 165, and 167 would have conflicted with state highway designations, so there were no Arkansas state highways with these numbers. The highest number was 115, with 116 and up reserved for future use.

1924 designation	meaning
A1-A9	Primary federal aid roads
B1-B43	Secondary federal aid roads
C1-C46	Connecting state roads

This article is part of the highway renumbering series.
Alabama	1928, 1957
Arkansas	1926
California	1964
Colorado	1953, 1968
Connecticut	1932, 1963
Florida	1945
Indiana	1926
Iowa	1926, 1969
Louisiana	1955
Maine	1933
Massachusetts	1933
Minnesota	1934
Missouri	1926
Montana	1932
Nebraska	1926
Nevada	1976
New Jersey	1927, 1953
New Mexico	1926, 1988
New York	1927, 1930
North Carolina	1934, 1937, 1940, 1961
North Dakota	1926
Ohio	1923, 1927, 1962
Pennsylvania	1928, 1961
Puerto Rico	1953
South Carolina	1928, 1937
South Dakota	1927, 1975
Tennessee	1983
Texas	1939, 1990
Utah	1962, 1977
Virginia	1923, 1928, 1933, 1940, 1958
Washington	1964
Wisconsin	1926
Wyoming	1927

== 1926 routes ==
New designation	From	To
State Road 1	McGehee	Near Corning
State Road 2	Texarkana	Leland
State Road 3	Louisiana	Cunningham Corner
State Road 4	Oklahoma	Arkansas City
State Road 5	North Little Rock	Missouri
State Road 6	Y City	Pine Bluff
State Road 7	Camden	Harrison
State Road 8	Oklahoma	Eudora
State Road 9	Camden	Mammoth Spring
State Road 10	Greenwood	Little Rock
State Road 11	Pansy	Hardy
State Road 12	Oklahoma	Ash Flat
State Road 13	Louisiana	Near Pine Bluff
State Road 14	Omaha	Near Marked Tree
State Road 15	Louisiana	England
State Road 16	Near Siloam Springs	Marion
State Road 17	Indian Bay	Newport
State Road 18	Diaz	Barfield
State Road 19	Louisiana	Delight
State Road 20	Near Monroe	Mississippi River near Westover
State Road 21	Near Clarksville	Missouri
State Road 22	Fort Smith	Dardanelle
State Road 23	Waldron	Oak Hill
State Road 24	Lockesburg	Camden
State Road 25	Wooster	Missouri
State Road 26	Dierks	Near Arkadelphia
State Road 27	Ben Lomond	Harriet
State Road 28	Oklahoma	Ola
State Road 29	Louisiana	Blevins
State Road 30	Near Little Rock	De Witt
State Road 31	Near Sherrill	Beebe
State Road 32	Oklahoma	Near Fulton
State Road 33	Near Roe	Tupelo
State Road 34	Near Walnut Ridge	Piggott
State Road 35	Gaines Landing	Benton
State Road 36	Hamlet	Searcy
State Road 37	McCrory	Grubbs
State Road 38	Desarc	Cotton Plant
State Road 39	Paragould	Saint Francis
State Road 40	Marked Tree	Osceola
State Road 41	De Queen	Texas
State Road 42	Near Parkin	Beedeville
State Road 43	Missouri	Boxley
State Road 44	Near Gillett	Near Helena
State Road 45	Near Hindsville	Oklahoma
State Road 46	Near Tulip	Prattsville
State Road 47	Rogers	Missouri
State Road 48	Near Tulip	Ferindale
State Road 49	Near Helena	Elaine
State Road 50	Widener	Chatfield
State Road 51	Arkadelphia	near Prescott
State Road 52	Near Berlin	Empire
State Road 53	Gurdon	Bluff City
State Road 54	Dumas	Back Gate
State Road 55	Mineral Springs	Fulton
State Road 56	Hedges	Ash Flat
State Road 57	Donaldson	Near Mount Holly
State Road 58	Near Melbourne	Williford
State Road 59	Eudora	Louisiana
State Road 60	Perryville	Near Beebe
State Road 62	Near Mammoth Spring	Near Paragould
State Road 66	Leslie	Mountain View
State Road 68	Springdale	Near Marble
State Road 69	Melbourne	Batesville
State Road 72	Bentonville	Near Eureka Springs
State Road 73	Allbrook	Hope
State Road 74	Winslow	Crosses
State Road 75	Turrell	Near Widener
State Road 76	Onyx	Near Ava
State Road 77	Missouri	Athelstan
State Road 78	Wheatley	Near Moro
State Road 79	Missouri	Cave City
State Road 80	Oklahoma	Near Prairie Grove
State Road 81	Near McArthur	Arkansas City
State Road 82	Near Lodge Corner	De Witt
State Road 83	Monticello	University of Arkansas at Monticello
State Road 84	Kirby	Perla
State Road 85	Barton	Lake View
State Road 86	Oklahoma	Gillham
State Road 87	Bradford	Pleasant Plains
State Road 88	Oklahoma	Mena
State Road 89	Cabot	Lonoke
State Road 90	Near Rector	Missouri
State Road 91	Near Walnut Ridge	Near Jonesboro
State Road 92	Near Springfield	Plumerville
State Road 93	Missouri	Dalton
State Road 94	Rogers	Spring Valley
State Road 95	Clinton	Morrilton
State Road 96	Greenwood	Bloomer
State Road 97	Walnut Ridge	Near Walnut Ridge
State Road 98	Altus	Roseville
State Road 99	Summers	Oklahoma
State Road 100	US 71 in Bentonville	Route 88 at the Missouri state line
State Road 101	Henderson	Missouri
State Road 102	Gravette	Maysville
State Road 103	Near Sand Gap	Western Grove
State Road 104	Pine Bluff	Sulphur Springs
State Road 105	Near Hector	Atkins
State Road 106	Gregory	Grays
State Road 107	Gravette	Gentry
State Road 108	Jacksonville	Near Jacksonville
State Road 109	Near Ozark	Magazine
State Road 110	Botkinburg	Shirley
State Road 111	Near Alexander	Alexander
State Road 112	Fayetteville	Tontitown
State Road 113	Poyen	Leola
State Road 114	Near Meroney	Gould
State Road 115	Thornton	El Dorado

== See also ==
- List of state highways in Arkansas
