= Arkansas Highway 6 =

Former state highway in Arkansas, United States

State Road 6

Route information
- Maintained by AHD
- Length: 162 mi (261 km)
- Existed: 1926–1935

Major junctions
- West end: US 71
- US 71 in Y City; US 70 in Hot Springs; US 67 in Malvern; US 167 in Sheridan
- East end: US 65 in Pine Bluff

Location
- Country: United States
- State: Arkansas
- Counties: Polk, Montgomery, Garland, Hot Spring, Grant, Jefferson

Highway system
- Arkansas Highway System; Interstate; US; State; Business; Spurs; Suffixed; Scenic; Heritage
| ← AR 5 | → AR 7 |

Highway 6 (AR 6) was a state highway in Arkansas that traveled from Y City to Pine Bluff. It has been supplanted by U.S. Route 270 and AR 365 Spur. AR 6 was also a designation of US 49 until 1964. It was maintained by the Arkansas Highway Department (AHD), now the Arkansas Department of Transportation (ArDOT).

== Route description ==
AR 6 began at an intersection with US 71 in Y City. The highway then met AR 88 in Pencil Bluff and AR 27 in Mt. Ida before heading to Hot Springs. Entering the city, AR 6 met US 70 southwest of downtown and traveled concurrent with it through downtown Hot Springs. After leaving Hot Springs, AR 6 entered Malvern, crossing present Interstate 30 (I-30), and traveled through downtown with US 67. AR 6 met AR 190/AR 291 in Prattsville before crossing paths with US 167 in Sheridan.

The highway ended in what is now Pine Bluff on US 65, now AR 365; the intersection (now AR 365 and AR 365 Spur) was outside the Pine Bluff city limits at that time. US 270 also ended at that intersection until it was truncated to White Hall when US 65 was relocated to a freeway, now I-530. The former easternmost section of AR 6 (and US 270), from White Hall to Pine Bluff, is now AR 365 Spur.

== US 49 portion ==
AR 6 was designated in 1961 from Highway 20 in Helena east across the bridge. In 1962, it extended to Brinkley. It met AR 1 at Walnut Corner, US 79 near Monroe and US 70 in Brinkley, where it terminated. This was transferred to US 49 in 1963.

== See also ==
- List of state highways in Arkansas
