= U.S. Route 71 in Arkansas =

US Highway section within the state of Arkansas

U.S. Highway 71
- Route of US 71 in Arkansas in red

Route information
- Maintained by ArDOT, TxDOT
- Length: 310.0 mi (498.9 km) About 4 miles of highway is located in Texas near Texarkana

Major junctions
- South end: US 71 at the Louisiana state line near Doddridge
- I-49 / AR 151 in Texarkana; I-30 in Texarkana; I-540 / US 71B in Fort Smith; I-49 near Alma; I-40 / US 71B in Alma; I-49 / AR 16 / AR 265 in Fayetteville
- North end: US 71 at the Missouri state line near Bella Vista

Location
- Country: United States
- State: Arkansas
- Counties: Miller, Bowie (TX), Little River, Sevier, Polk, Scott, Logan, Sebastian, Crawford, Washington, Benton

Highway system
- United States Numbered Highway System; List; Special; Divided; Arkansas Highway System; Interstate; US; State; Business; Spurs; Suffixed; Scenic; Heritage
- Highways in Texas; Interstate; US; State; Former; Toll; Loops; Spurs; FM/RM; Park; Rec
← US 70	AR	→ AR 72
← US 70	TX	→ SH 71

U.S. Route 71 (US 71) is a U.S. route that runs from Krotz Springs, LA to the Fort Frances–International Falls International Bridge at the Canadian border. In Arkansas, the highway runs from the Louisiana state line near Doddridge to the Missouri state line near Bella Vista. In Texarkana, the highway runs along State Line Avenue with US 59 and partially runs in Texas (northbound traffic is in Arkansas and southbound in Texas). Other areas served by the highway include Fort Smith and Northwest Arkansas.

== Route description ==
Location of US 71 within Texas

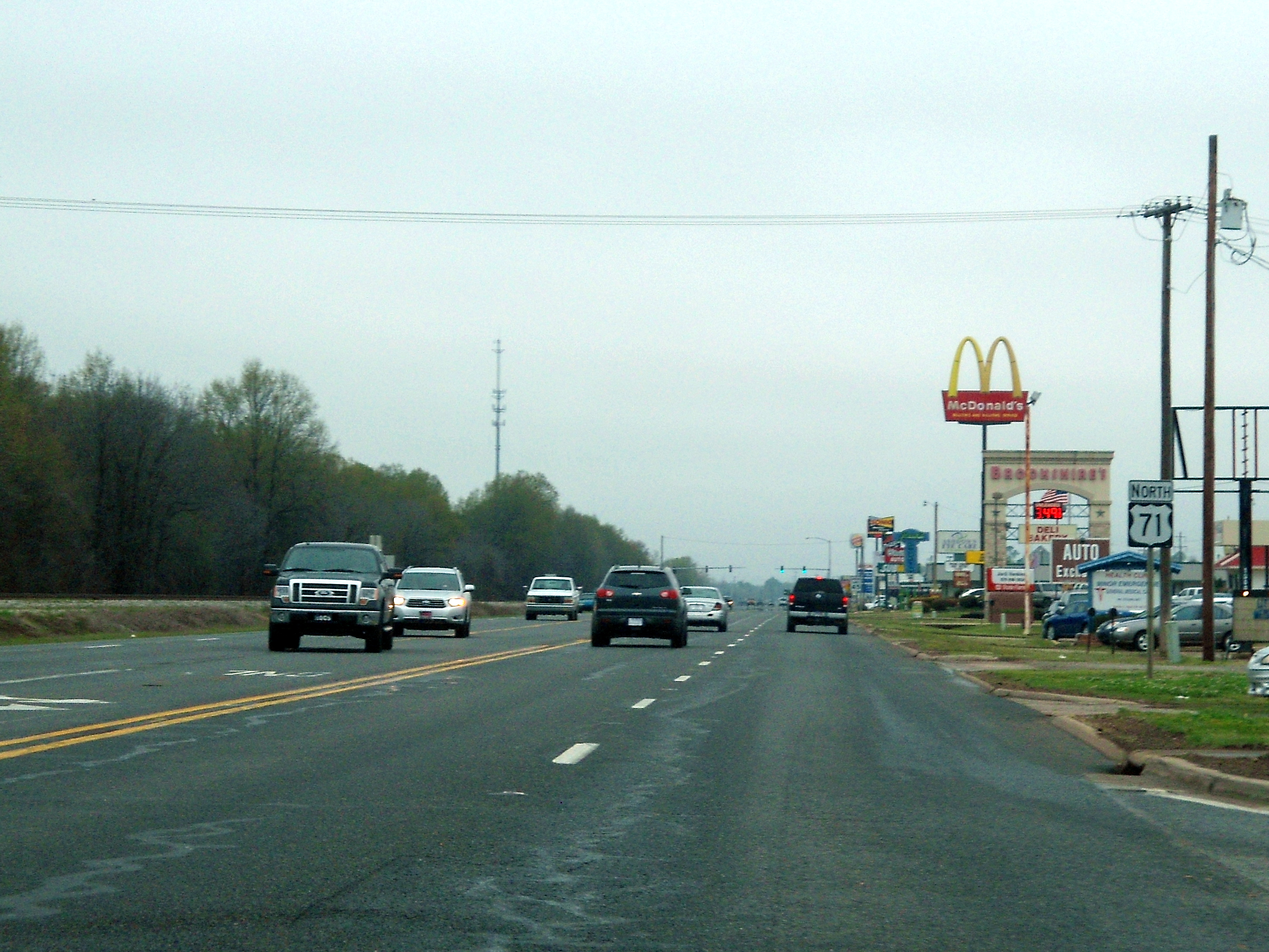
US 59/US 71 in Ashdown

The route enters Arkansas near the Red River, and runs north through the communities of Doddridge and Fouke. Most motorists can now bypass US 71 from the Louisiana border to Texarkana via Interstate 49. After approximately 30 miles (48 km) of paralleling I-49, the route turns west, passes the historic Averitt House and enters Texarkana. Highway 71 has a brief concurrency with Highway 237 before crossing over The Loop Interstate 49 (former Interstate 130) in the southeast part of town.

Inside the loop, Highway 71 becomes East Street, passing the Texarkana Country Club and Hobo Jungle Park before becoming Hickory Street in downtown Texarkana. The street is four-lane undivided, passing the Bottoms House and J.K. Wadley House before meeting US 67/US 82. US 71 forms a short, two-block concurrency with US 67/US 82 before turning north along Hazel Street. This street runs northwest to intersect State Line Avenue. On State Line Avenue, the northbound lanes are in Arkansas, while the southbound lanes are in Texas. While on State Line Avenue, US 71 intersects Loop 14 (Texas Boulevard), in Texas, and Arkansas Boulevard, in Arkansas. Before US 59 joins US 71 at Interstate 30, nearly a mile north.

From Arkansas Highway 296 north of Texarkana to the Red River, US 71 runs concurrent with US 59 as a divided highway. Except for the northbound lanes (which return to the Arkansas side just before the Red River), this section of 3.39 miles (5.46 km) is entirely in Texas. (Note: Map note: 3.39 mi. exception to Texas portion of US 71)

The highways re-enter Arkansas (specifically Little River County) completely at the Red River. Less than a mile north of the River, all commercial truck traffic is required to pull into an Arkansas Highway Police weigh station. US 59/US 71 serve as an eastern terminus for Highway 380 upon entering Ogden. Although US 59/US 71 bypass the community as a four-lane highway, the route formerly served Ogden as Grand Street, which as of 2016, retains original 1926 US 71 paving for some of its length. Following the Kansas City Southern Railroad tracks, US 59/US 71 enters Ashdown, where it becomes Constitution Avenue. As it heads north, the routes goes under Highway 32, entering the southern part of Ashdown, serving as Little River's county seat. The highway is named Constitution Avenue, and passes within two blocks of the Little River County Courthouse. The routes intersect with Highway 32B, Rankin Street, and Highway 108, before exiting town due north to Wilton. Entering Wilton, it passes the S.S.P. Mills and Son Building, Highway 234, and the Texarkana and Fort Smith Railway Depot. Just north of town a former alignment comes into view briefly before the Mills Cemetery and the Sevier County line.

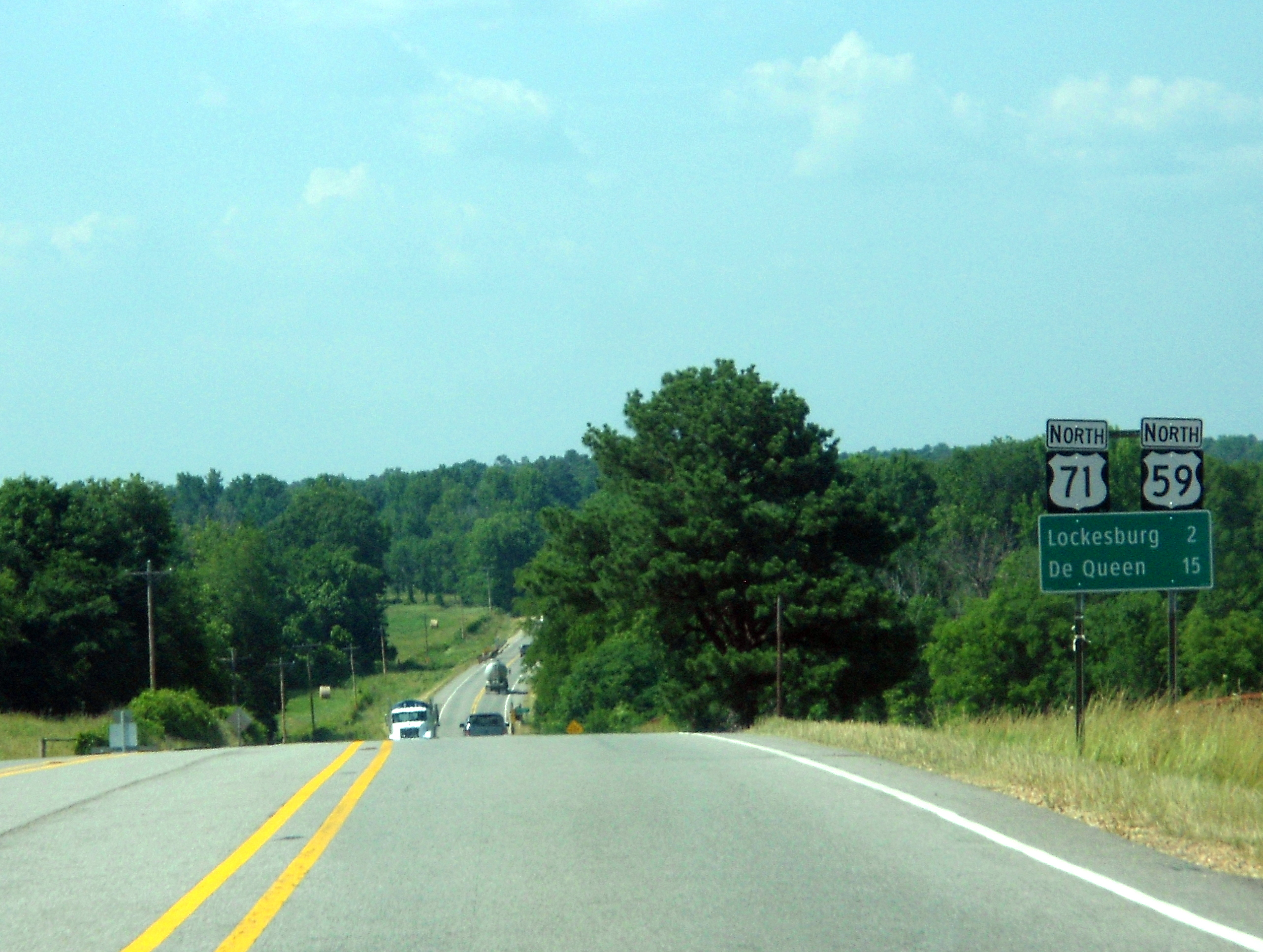
US 59/US 71 south of Lockesburg

Once across the Little River, US 59/US 71 passes another former alignment, crosses through Pond Creek National Wildlife Refuge, and runs east of Ben Lomond before entering Lockesburg. A junction in Lockesburg joins US 59/US 71 with US 371, with Highway 24 running west from the junction. Five miles (8.0 km) north of Lockesburg US 70 joins US 59/US 71/US 371, and the concurrent routes turn west to De Queen. Upon entering De Queen, US 59/US 71 turns north, US 70 continues west, US 70 Business/Highway 41 (US 70B/AR 41) runs south, and US 371 terminates at the junction. US 59/US 71 continue through Gillham and Grannis to serve as the western terminus of US 278 in Wickes. Junctions with Highway 246 and Highway 4 precede the route entering Mena, the county seat of Polk County.

In Mena, US 59/US 71 has a brief overlap with Highway 8, during which the routes pass two NRHP listings, the Mena Kansas City-Southern Depot and the Mena Commercial Historic District. US 59/US 71/AR 8 also has an overlap with Highway 88, although the western end of the overlap serves as the eastern terminus of the Talimena Scenic Drive National Scenic Byway designation. After Highway 8 and Highway 88 have left the route US 59/US 71 run north to a junction with US 270 in Acorn. At a fork in the road, US 59 splits onto US 270 west, and US 270 east begins a concurrency with US 71 northbound into Ouachita National Forest. US 71/US 270 continue into Scott County to Y City, where the concurrency ends and US 270 turns east. US 71 runs north through the forest to Waldron, a town the mainline route bypasses to the west while US 71B runs through downtown Waldron. While skirting Waldron, US 71 has a junction with Highway 272 near Waldron Municipal Airport as well as junctions with Highway 248, Highway 80, and Highway 28. This section of US 71 from north of Mena through Fayetteville (following the original sections bypassing the new Interstate 540 has been designated a scenic byway and the Boston Mountains Scenic Loop.

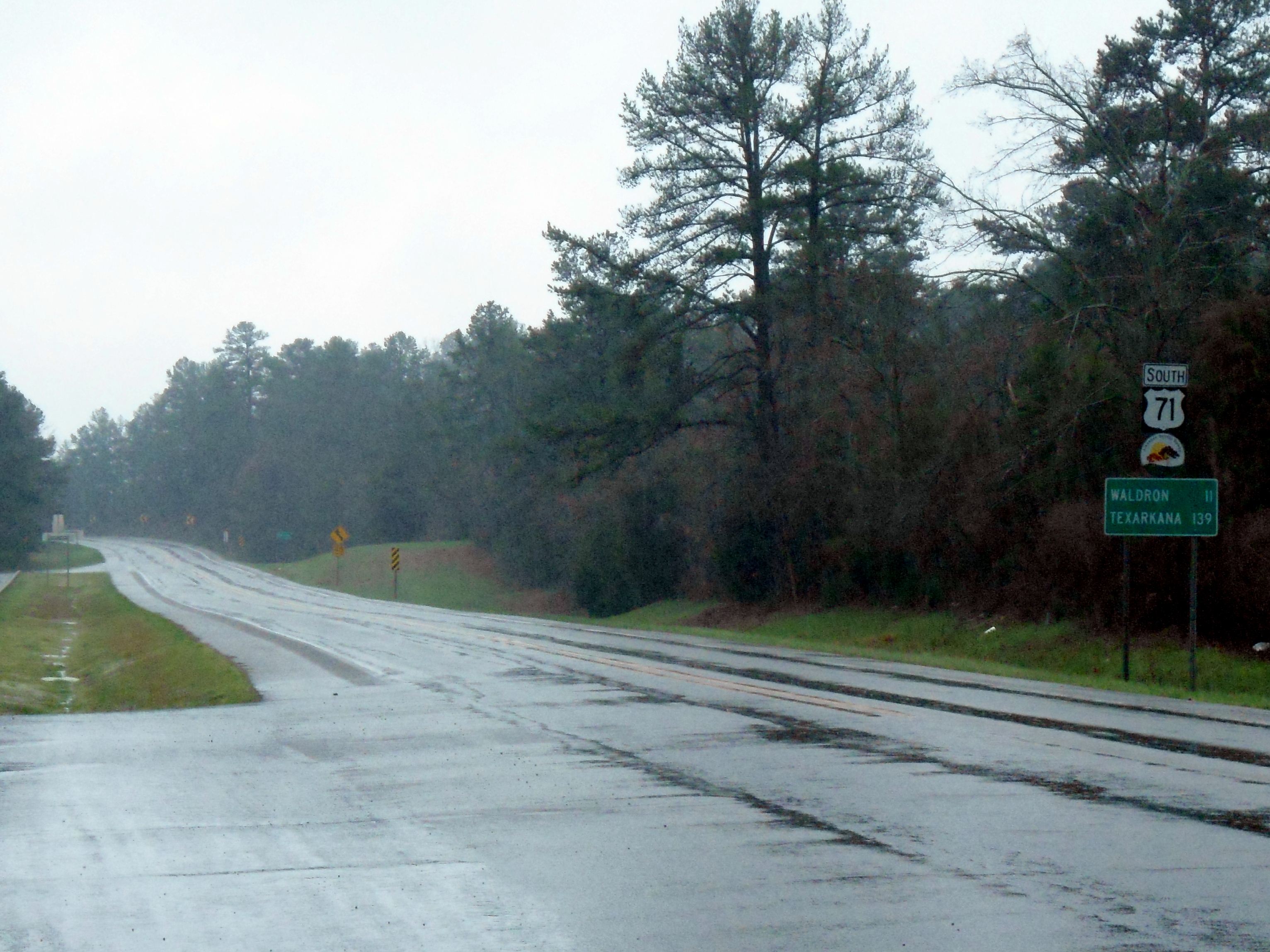
First reassurance marker south of the AR 23 junction in Scott County

North of Waldron, US 71 passes through Mansfield and Greenwood before intersecting with Interstate 540 on the south end of Fort Smith. US 71 overlaps I-540 for approximately 12 miles (19 km) until it reaches Interstate 40, then US-71 follows I-40 six miles (9.7 km) to Alma.

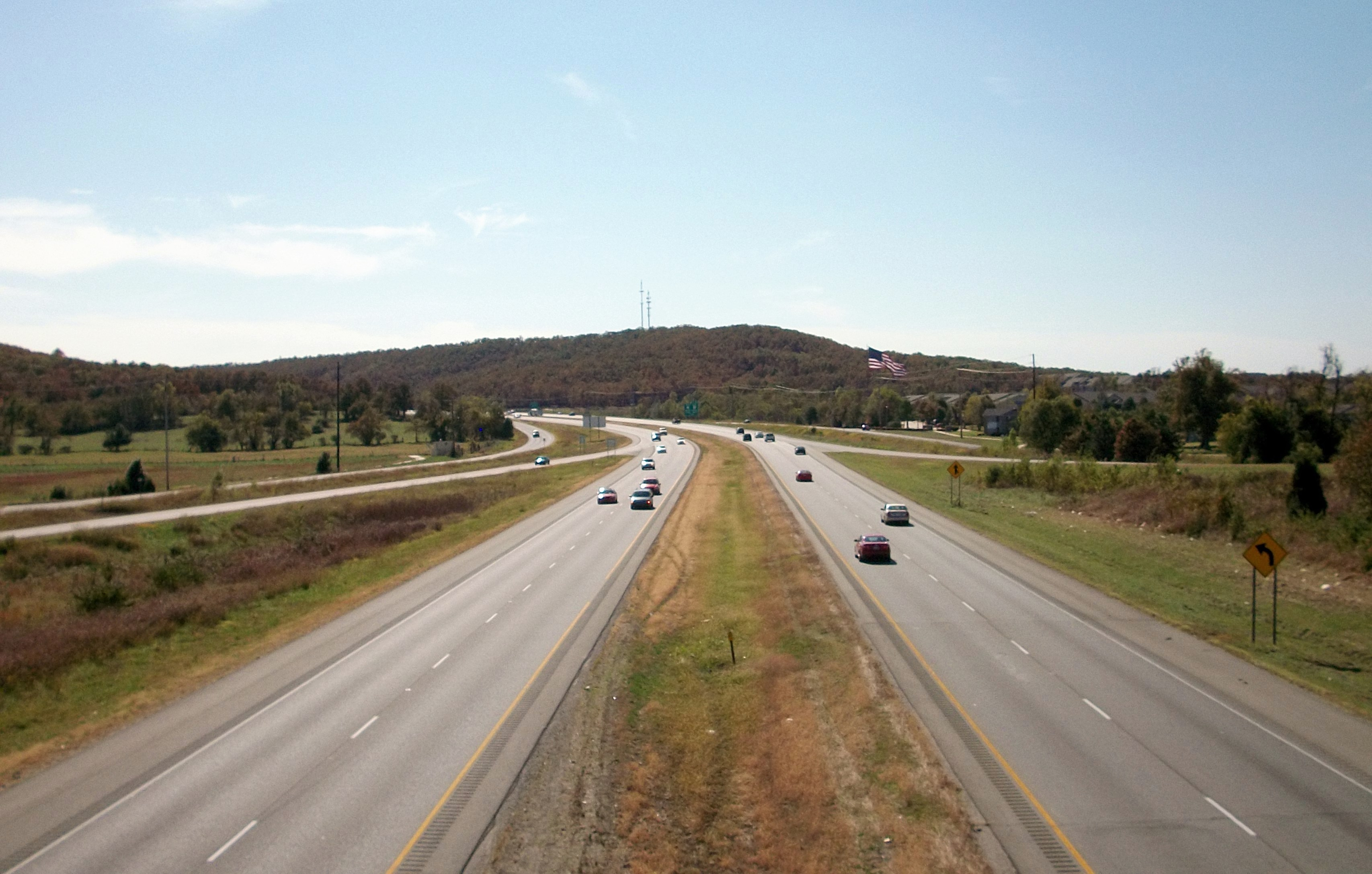
US 71 concurrent with I-49 in Northwest Arkansas

US 71 passes through Mountainburg, Winslow, West Fork and Greenland on its way to Fayetteville. At Fayetteville, US 71 overlaps I-49 to Bentonville, as well as U.S. Route 62.

North of Bentonville US 71 continues another 12 miles (19 km) passing through Bella Vista to the Missouri state line.

=== Transit ===
Jefferson Lines provides intercity bus service along the length of US-71 in Arkansas serving five communities.

== History ==
US 71 between Bentonville and the Arkansas–Missouri state line north of Bella Vista was once known as Highway 100. Running approximately 11 miles (18 km), its southern terminus was in Bentonville at the intersection of Central Ave and SW A Street. Its northern terminus was at the Arkansas–Missouri state line where it continued as Route 88. By the mid-1960s, Highway 100 had been replaced by a new alignment of US 71.

=== National Register of Historic Places ===
Six historic segments of Highway 71 remain intact and are listed on the National Register of Historic Places in Arkansas. The Wilton, Little River approach, and Greenland segments were added in 2004, followed by the Jenny Lind segment in 2009. The Ogden and Ashdown segments were added in 2013. Originally a seventh section, the Devil's Backbone segment, in Sebastian County was also listed in 2004, but it was removed from the register in 2009.

All six listings are contained within the Arkansas Highway History and Architecture Multiple Property Submission, which preserves history from Arkansas's highway building era between 1910 and 1965.

==== Ogden ====
The Old US 71 – Ogden Segment is a former alignment of US 71 in Ogden, Arkansas. The roadway consists of about 0.5 miles (0.80 km) of Ogden Street and Grand Street, extending from an intersection with the current of alignment of US 71 in the north and a second junction with US 71 in the south. It is significant as a well-preserved example of concrete highway construction from the 1930s, built in a period when this was the preferred form of roadway surface. This segment of the highway was built using "Bates-style" pavement with reinforcing rods, and is 18 feet (5.5 m) wide.

==== Ashdown ====
The Old US 71 – Ashdown Segment is a former alignment of US 71 in Ashdown, Arkansas. The roadway consists of about 0.5 miles (0.80 km) of North Park Avenue built in 1934, extending from its intersection with the current of alignment of US 71 in the north, to East Main Street in the south. It is significant as a well-preserved example of concrete highway construction from the 1930s, built in a period when this was the preferred form of roadway surface. This segment of the highway was built using "Bates-style" pavement with reinforcing rods, and is 18 feet (5.5 m) wide.

==== Wilton ====
The Old US 71 – Wilton Segment is a former alignment of US 71 near Wilton in Little River County, Arkansas. The roadway of about 2 miles (3.2 km) is a 1934 construction and was the main travel route in the county upon construction until US 59/US 71 bypassed this alignment in 1965.

Little River County began to grow with the coming of the railroad in the late nineteenth century. Towns were being established quickly, and railroads were springing up in the county. Millkin was established in 1890 and was renamed Wilton in 1892. The need for a bridge over the Little River became apparent to the county. A project to build a bridge was let in 1912, and the federal designation of US 71 came when Arkansas designated a state highway system in 1926.

The pavement for this section of US 71 was "Bates-type pavement". The winner of a high traffic contest in Bates, Illinois, Bates-type pavement is concrete with welded wire reinforcement. This type of pavement became very popular for high-volume highways in the 1930s.

The route served as a main artery in Little River County and as the main route between Texarkana and Fort Smith. The high traffic caused a settlement named Taylors Store to spring up north of Wilton, though it subsequently died out when this segment was bypassed in 1965. The route remains today as a drivable county road.

==== Little River approach ====
The Old US 71-Little River Approach is a largely abandoned former alignment of US 71 in southern Sevier County, Arkansas. Now designated Ashley Camp Road, it is a 2.75-mile-long (4.43 km) section of road, extending south from Arkansas Highway 234 to the Little River. It parallels the existing alignment of US 71, which travels to the west of this road section. The road is 18 feet (5.5 m) wide, with no shoulder, and was built in 1934 of Bates-style concrete, notable for its embedded reinforcing rods. The road was built on fill in order to raise it above the floodplain of the Little River, and includes five period bridges built as reliefs in the event of river flooding. It is the longest and most-intact section of the original US 71 alignment in the county.

==== Jenny Lind ====
The Old US 71-Jenny Lind Segment is a stretch of historic road pavement southeast of Jenny Lind, Arkansas. It consists of a bypassed section of U.S. Route 71 (US 71) that is now designated Doraul Acres Lane. It extends for about 0.75 miles (1.21 km), traveling roughly parallel to, and south of, the current alignment of US 71 between Hidden Valley Way and Shadow Lake Drive. It is concrete pavement 18 feet (5.5 m) wide with no shoulder, and there is a single concrete slab bridge, which spans Bear Creek. This roadway section was built 1927–29, when US 71 was first built. It was bypassed in 1959.

==== Greenland ====
The Old US 71 – Greenland Segment is a former alignment of US 71 near Greenland in Washington County, Arkansas. The roadway of about 0.75 miles (1.21 km) is a 1930 construction and was the main travel route in the county upon construction until US 71 bypassed this alignment in 1980.

Washington County began to grow with the coming of the railroad in the late nineteenth century. The St. Louis–San Francisco Railway (Frisco) came through the area in the 1870s and communities began forming quickly in the newly accessible area. Influential Fayetteville businessmen persuaded the railroad to come through the city rather than a western alignment through Prairie Grove. Rugby was founded in 1882, renamed Staunton, and would become Greenland by 1909.

Improvements came when the wagon road through the area was redesignated as part of the Jefferson Highway. Convict labor combined with a compulsory five days of labor required by law at the time to improve the gravel roadway. Now a route of national importance, the Jefferson Highway was eligible for inclusion in a federal paving program, and bridges were contracted through the Arkansas State Highway Commission. The federal designation of US 71 came when Arkansas designated a state highway system in 1926.

The route served as the main route between Fort Smith and Fayetteville. The high volume of traffic has caused the entire US 71 routing between Fort Smith and Fayetteville to be bypassed by Interstate 540 (I-540). This segment remains today as a drivable county road, Washington County Route 1194.

==== Historic segment gallery ====
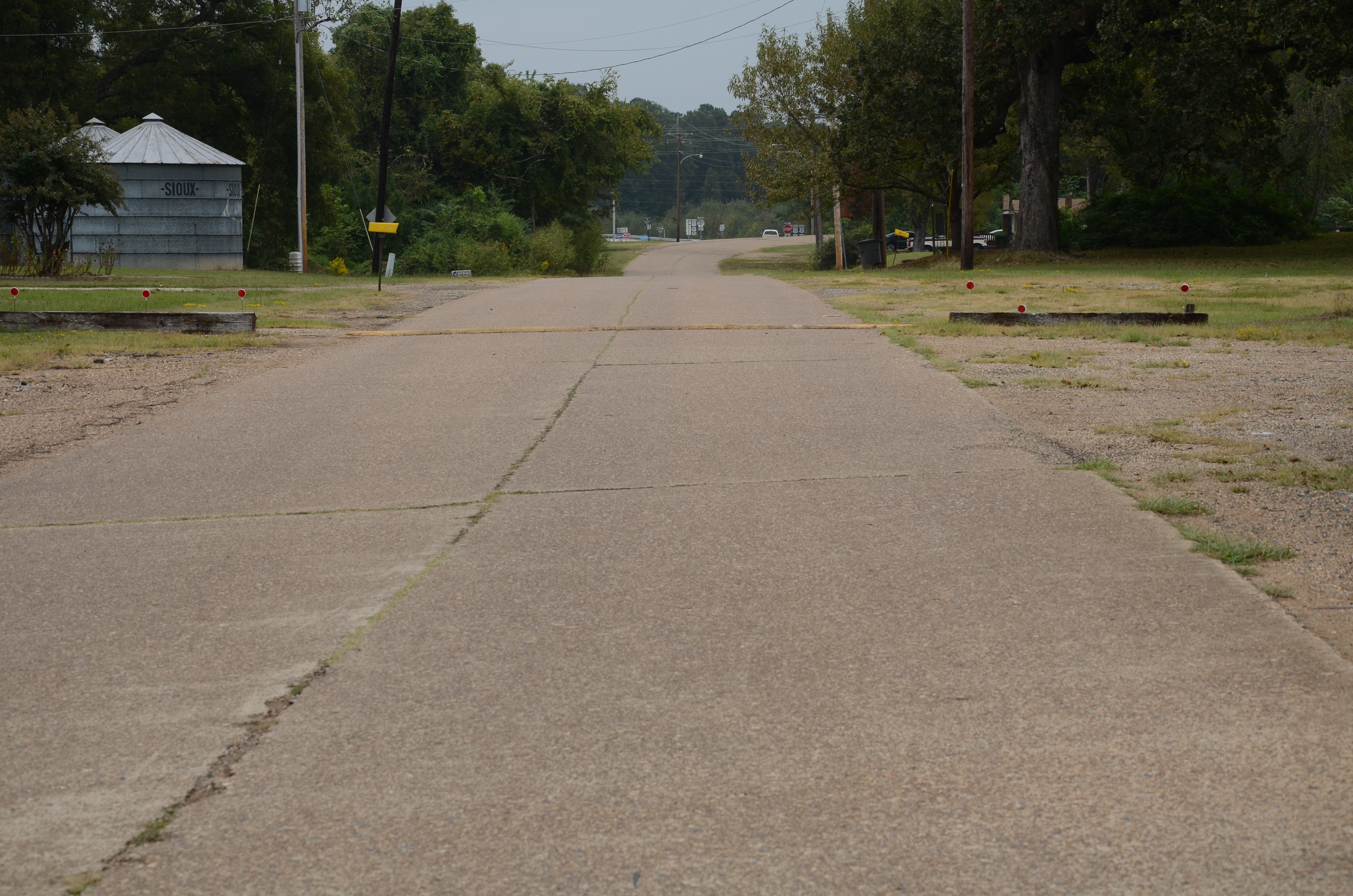
Ogden segment

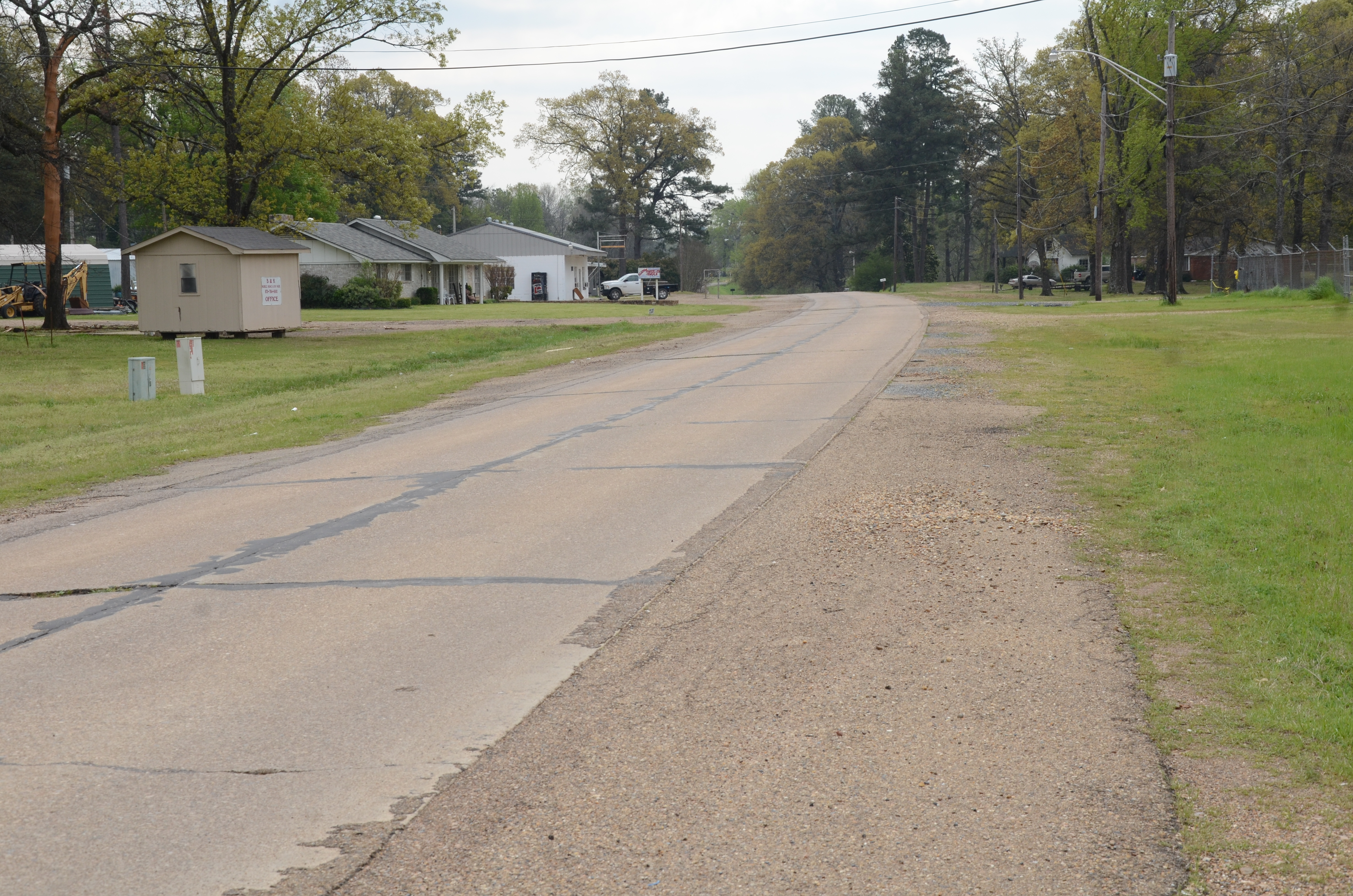
Ashdown segment

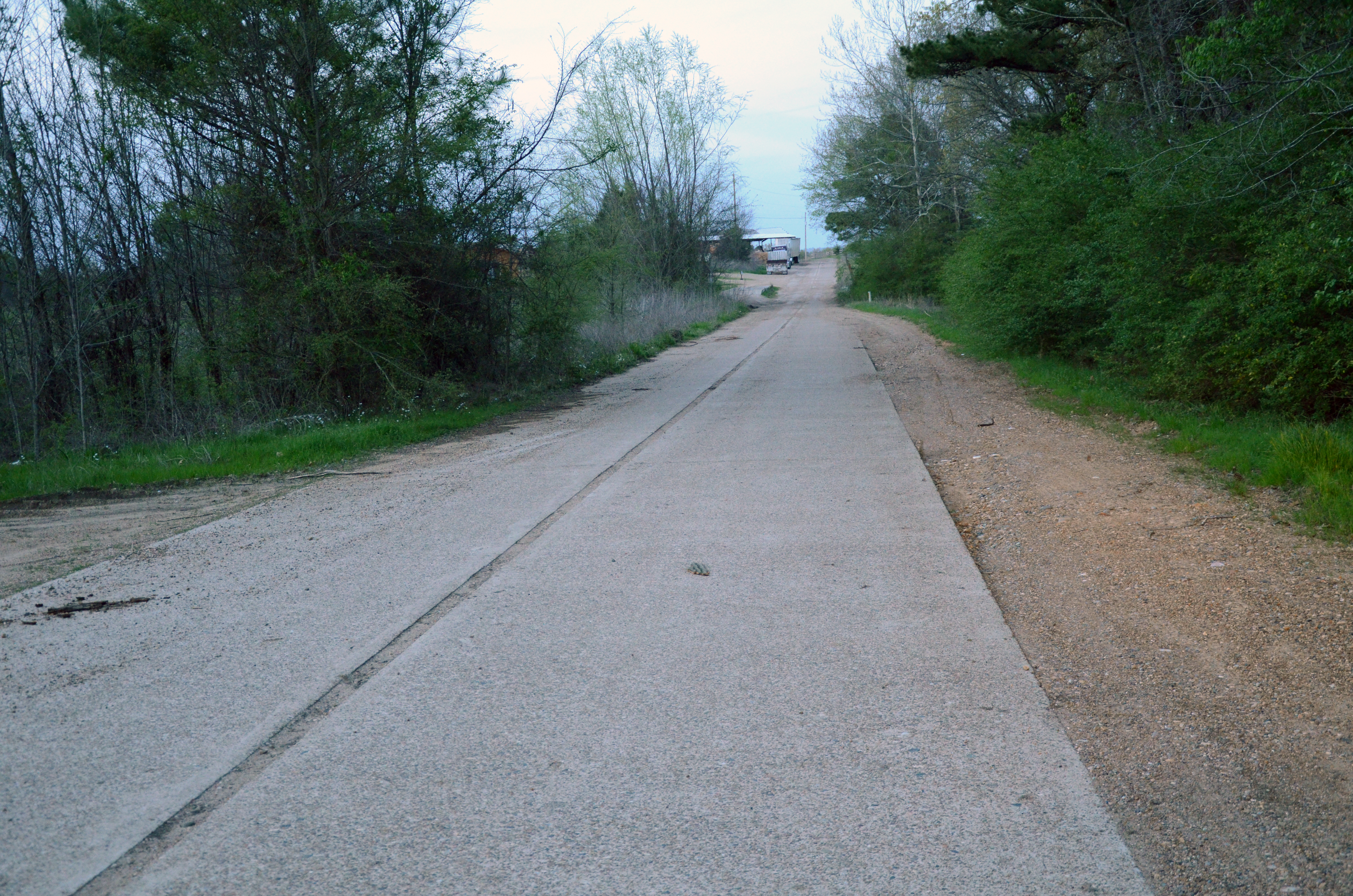
Wilton segment

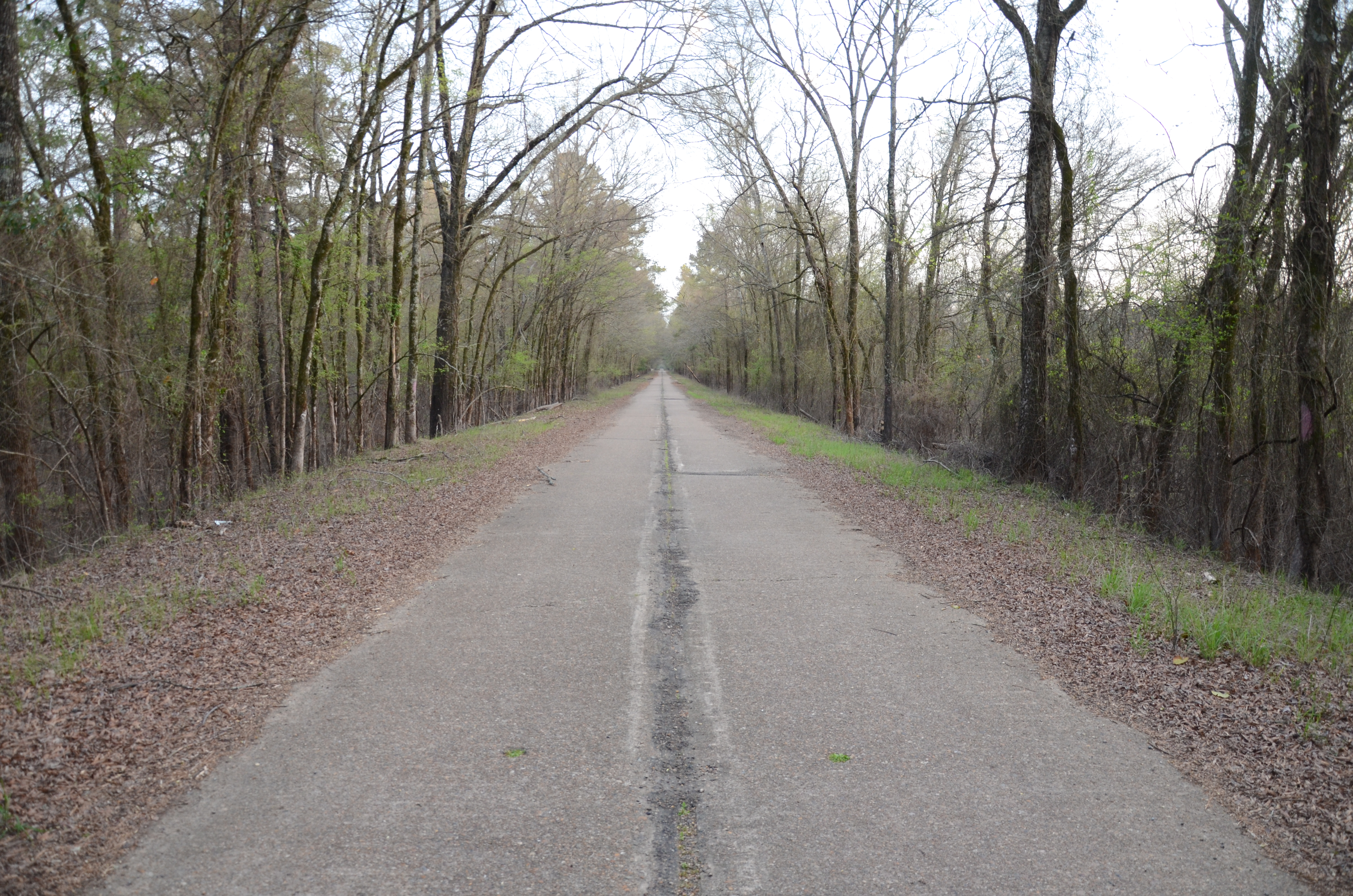
Little River approach segment

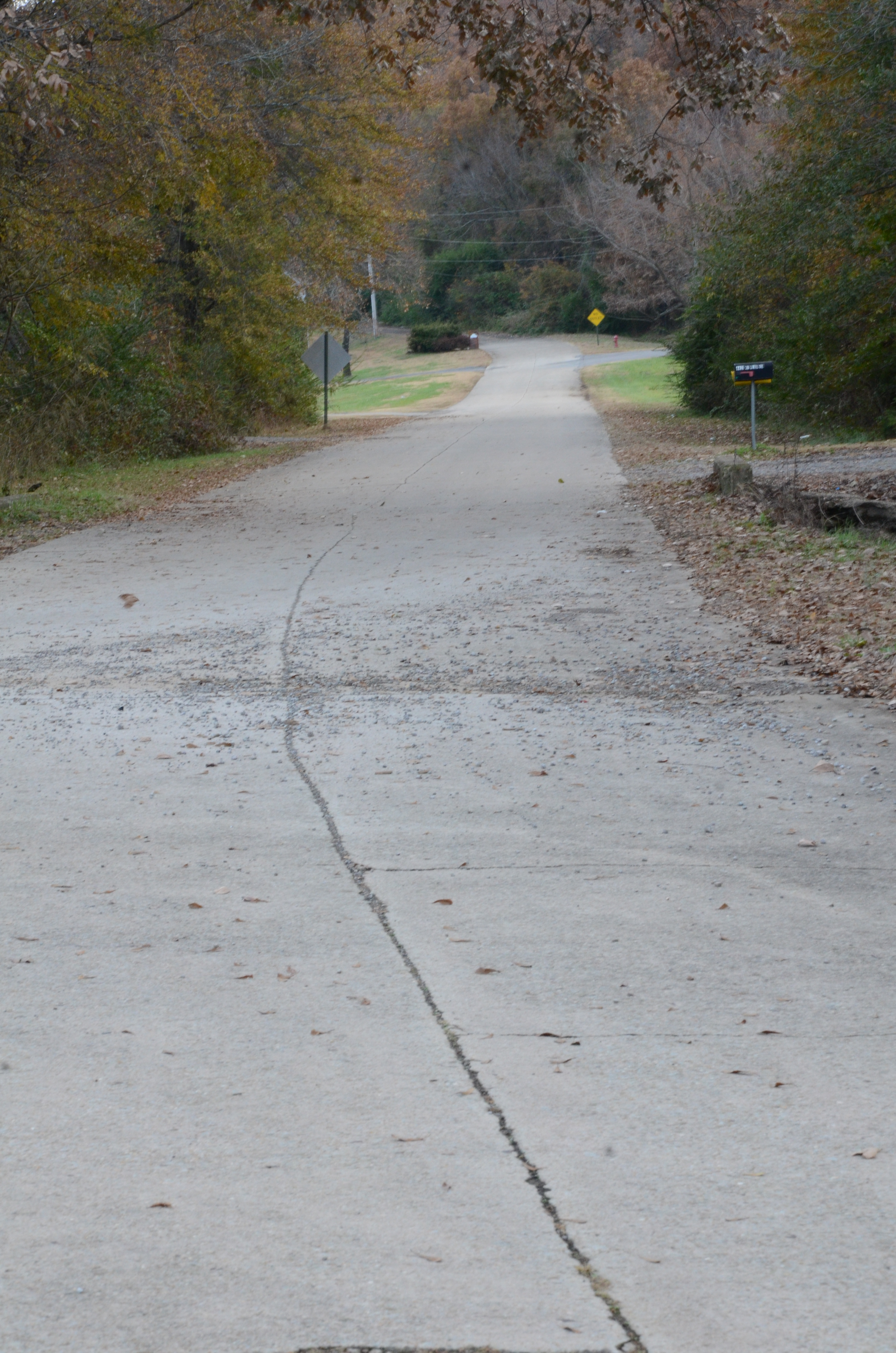
Jenny Lind segment

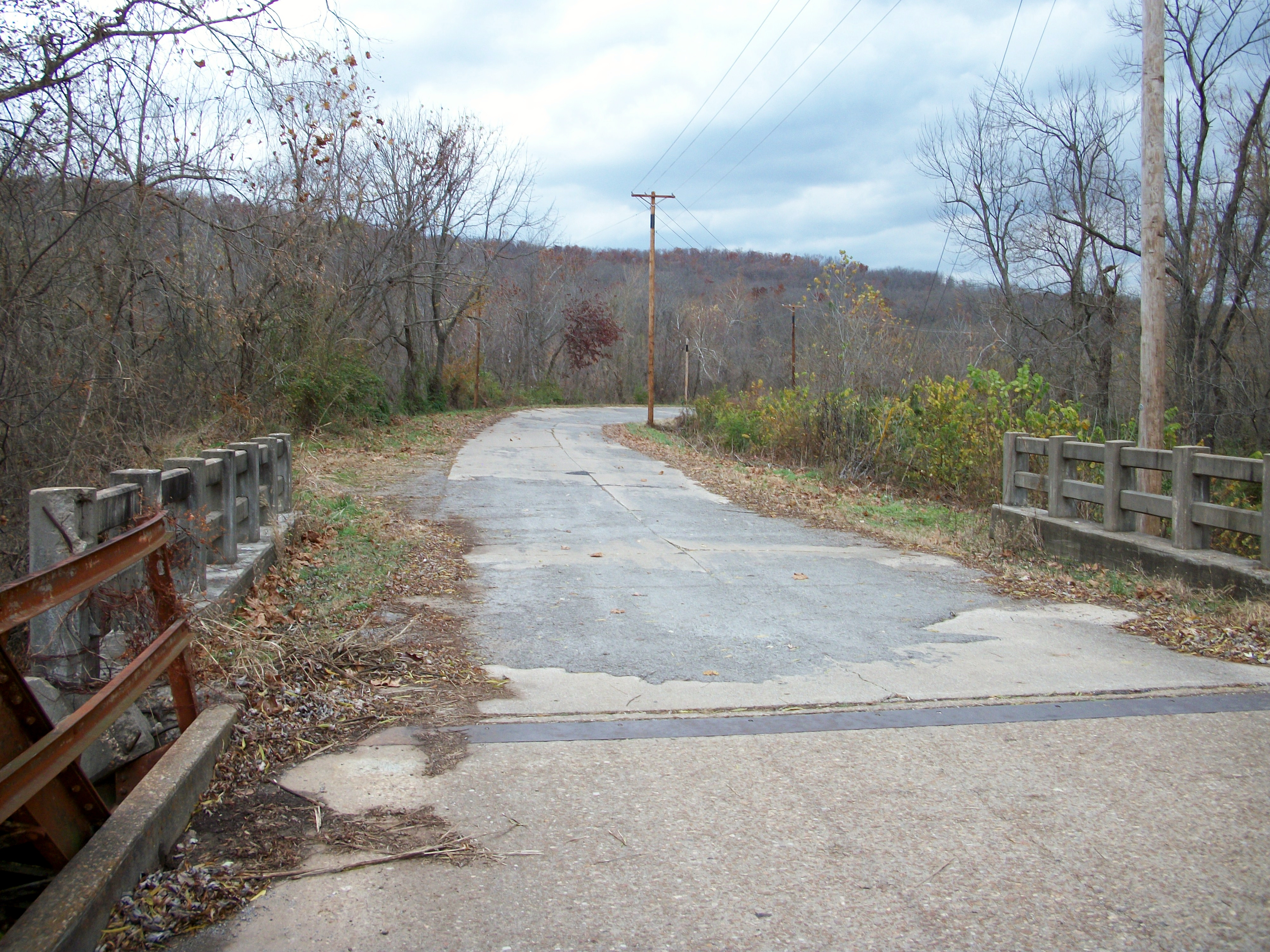
Old Highway 71 looking west from the truss bridge over the west fork of the White River (Greenland segment)

== Future ==
Most of US 71 will be bypassed by the northern extension of Interstate 49. The Missouri route has been completed, and continues near Pineville. The Bella Vista Bypass was completed October 1, 2021 and runs from Bentonville to Pineville and bypasses the town of Jane, Missouri. Also part of the I-49 extension, I-540 north of Alma has been replaced and resigned as Interstate 49.

The proposed southern extension of I-49 from AR 22 to I-40. Groundbreaking began 2022 and construct is planned to start in 2025 and should be completed in the 2030s.

== Major intersections ==
State	County	Location	mi	km	Exit	Destinations	Notes
Arkansas	Miller		0.00	0.00		US 71 south – Shreveport	Continuation into Louisiana
Arkansas	Miller		4.2	6.8		I-49 – Shreveport, Texarkana	Exit 4 on I-49; former AR 549
Arkansas	Miller	Doddridge	5.3	8.5		AR 160 – Brightstar, Bradley	
Arkansas	Miller		7.2	11.6		To I-49	Access via CR 197
Arkansas	Miller		14.8	23.8		AR 134 east – Garland City	
Arkansas	Miller		16.4	26.4		I-49 – Texarkana, Shreveport	Exit 16 on I-49; former AR 549
Arkansas	Miller	Texarkana	26.6	42.8		AR 237 north – Mandeville	Southern end of AR 237 concurrency
Arkansas	Miller	Texarkana	27.9	44.9		AR 237 south – Sulphur River Wildlife Management Area, Brightstar	Northern end of AR 237 concurrency
Arkansas	Miller	Texarkana	29.2	47.0		I-49 / AR 151 south to I-30 – Little Rock, Shreveport, Dallas	Exit 29A on I-49; exit 29 on AR 151
Arkansas	Miller	Texarkana	31.3	50.4		AR 196 east (Division Street)	
Arkansas	Miller	Texarkana	32.3	52.0		US 67 north / US 82 east (East 7th Street)	One-way street; southern end of US 67/US 82 concurrency
Arkansas	Miller	Texarkana	32.3	52.0		US 67 / US 82 (9th Street)	One-way street, inbound access only
Arkansas–Texas state line	Miller–Bowie county line	Texarkana	32.8	52.8		US 67 / US 82 (West 7th Street)	One-way street, inbound access only
Arkansas–Texas state line	Miller–Bowie county line	Texarkana	32.8	52.8		US 67 south / US 82 west (Dr. Martin Luther King Jr. Boulevard)	One way street, outbound access only; northern end of US 67/US 82 concurrency; access to Wadley Regional Medical Center
Arkansas–Texas state line	Miller–Bowie county line	Texarkana	35.0	56.3		Loop 14 (Texas Boulevard) / Arkansas Boulevard – Texarkana Airport	
Arkansas–Texas state line	Miller–Bowie county line	Texarkana	35.6	57.3		I-30 / US 59 south / Saint Michael Drive / Realtor Avenue	Southern end of US 59 concurrency; exit 223 on I-30
Arkansas–Texas state line	Miller–Bowie county line	Texarkana	37.0	59.5		AR 296 east (Sugar Hill Road)	
Texas	Bowie		1.4	2.3		I-49 south – Little Rock, Shreveport	Current northern terminus and exit 42 on I-49; former AR 549
Texas	Bowie		3.2	5.1		AR 108 east	
Arkansas	Little River	Red River	4.0 41.3	6.4 66.5		Bridge	
Arkansas	Little River	Ogden	44.1	71.0		AR 380 east	
Arkansas	Little River	Ashdown	51.0	82.1		AR 32 – Foreman, Millwood Dam	Interchange
Arkansas	Little River	Ashdown	52.3	84.2		AR 32B east (Rankin Street) – Millwood Dam	Southern end of AR 32B concurrency
Arkansas	Little River	Ashdown	52.5	84.5		AR 32B west (Main Street)	Northern end of AR 32B concurrency
Arkansas	Little River	Ashdown	54.3	87.4		AR 108 west to AR 41	
Arkansas	Little River	Wilton	57.3	92.2		AR 234 west – Alleene	
Arkansas	Sevier		62.6	100.7		AR 234 east – Ben Lomond, Brownstown	
Arkansas	Sevier		64.4	103.6		AR 27 north – Ben Lomond, Nashville	
Arkansas	Sevier	Bellville	71.6	115.2		AR 317 south – Cowlingsville	
Arkansas	Sevier	Lockesburg	73.7	118.6		US 371 south / AR 24 west – Horatio, Nashville	Southern end of US 371 concurrency
Arkansas	Sevier		79.2	127.5		US 70 east – Dierks, Lake Greeson, Hot Springs, Crater of Diamonds State Park, Daisy State Park	Southern end of US 70 concurrency
Arkansas	Sevier					I-49	Proposed
Arkansas	Sevier	De Queen	87.1	140.2		US 70 west / US 70B west / AR 41 south – Hugo, Foreman, Cossatot Community College University of Arkansas, Airport	Northern end of US 70/US 371 concurrency
Arkansas	Polk	Wickes	106.6	171.6		US 278 east – Nashville, Cossatot River State Park Natural Area	
Arkansas	Polk		109.3	175.9		AR 84 west – Bogg Springs	
Arkansas	Polk		113.1	182.0		AR 246 east – Vandervoort	
Arkansas	Polk	Cove	117.2	188.6		AR 4 west – Watson	
Arkansas	Polk	Hatfield	121.7	195.9		AR 246 west	
Arkansas	Polk	Old Potter	127.8	205.7		AR 375 east – Potter	
Arkansas	Polk	Mena	131.3	211.3		AR 8 west (Reine Street) – Rocky	Southern end of AR 8 concurrency
Arkansas	Polk	Mena	132.6	213.4		AR 88 west (Mena Street) – Queen Wilhelmina State Park, Talimena Scenic Drive	Southern end of AR 88 concurrency
Arkansas	Polk	Mena	133.4	214.7		AR 8 east (Morrow Avenue) – Norman, Airport	Northern end of AR 8 concurrency
Arkansas	Polk	Mena	134.3	216.1		AR 88 east – Pencil Bluff	Northern end of AR 88 concurrency
Arkansas	Polk	Acorn	138.3	222.6		US 59 north / US 270 west – Heavener, Rich Mountain	Northern end of US 59 concurrency; southern end of US 270 concurrency
Arkansas	Scott	Y City				I-49	Proposed
Arkansas	Scott	Y City	153.7	247.4		US 270 east – Hot Springs	Northern end of US 270 concurrency
Arkansas	Scott	Needmore	159.9	257.3		AR 28 east – Parks	
Arkansas	Scott		163.8	263.6		US 71B north to AR 250 – Waldron	
Arkansas	Scott		166.7	268.3		AR 272 east	Southern end of AR 272 concurrency
Arkansas	Scott		166.8	268.4		AR 272 west – Airport	Northern end of AR 272 concurrency
Arkansas	Scott	Waldron	167.2	269.1		AR 248 west – Lake Hinkle	
Arkansas	Scott	Waldron	167.8	270.0		AR 80 – Hon, Danville	
Arkansas	Scott	Waldron	170.1	273.7		US 71B south – Waldron Business District	
Arkansas	Scott		170.9	275.0		AR 28 west – Heavener	
Arkansas	Scott	Elm Park	177.6	285.8		AR 378 west	
Arkansas	Scott		178.3	286.9		AR 23 north – Booneville	
Arkansas	Logan	No major junctions					
Arkansas	Scott	Mansfield				I-49	Proposed
Arkansas	Scott	Mansfield	187.9	302.4		AR 96 west (Huntington Avenue) – Hartford, Mansfield Business District	
Arkansas	Sebastian	Huntington	189.4	304.8		AR 252 west (Crescent Street) – Slaytonville	Southern end of AR 252 concurrency
Arkansas	Sebastian		191.4	308.0		AR 252 east – Dayton	Northern end of AR 252 concurrency
Arkansas	Sebastian					I-49	Proposed
Arkansas	Sebastian	Greenwood	198.3	319.1		AR 10 – Hackett, Greenwood, Mount Magazine State Park	
Arkansas	Sebastian	Greenwood	199.9	321.7		AR 10S east – Greenwood, Booneville	
Arkansas	Sebastian		203.4	327.3		Future I-49 north / AR 549 north	Current southern terminus and exit 187 on AR 549
Arkansas	Sebastian	Fort Smith	205.5	330.7		AR 45 south – Hackett	Southern end of AR 45 concurrency
Arkansas	Sebastian	Fort Smith	206.1	331.7		AR 45 north	Northern end of AR 45 concurrency
Arkansas	Sebastian	Fort Smith	208.2	335.1		I-540 south / US 71B north – Spiro	Southern end of I-540 concurrency; exit 12 on I-540
Arkansas	see I-540						
Arkansas	Crawford	Van Buren	220.2	354.4	1A	I-40 west – Oklahoma City I-540 ends	Northern terminus and exit 1B on I-540; southern end of I-40 concurrency; exit 7 on I-40
Arkansas	Crawford		224.8	361.8	12	I-49 north – Fayetteville	Current southern terminus and exits 20A-B on I-49; former I-540
Arkansas	Crawford	Alma	225.9	363.6		I-40 east / US 71B south – Little Rock, Alma	Northern end of I-40 concurrency; exit 13 on I-40
Arkansas	Crawford		229.7	369.7		AR 282 west – Rudy	Southern end of AR 282 concurrency
Arkansas	Crawford		230.4	370.8		AR 282 east	Northern end of AR 282 concurrency
Arkansas	Crawford		234.8	377.9		AR 348 east	
Arkansas	Crawford	Mountainburg	236.7	380.9		AR 282 west to I-49 – Fort Smith, Little Rock	
Arkansas	Crawford		240.0	386.2		AR 282 to I-49 – Chester	
Arkansas	Crawford		244.2	393.0		AR 400 south (Shepherd Spring Road) – Lake Fort Smith	
Arkansas	Washington	Winslow	252.5	406.4		AR 74 west – Winslow, Devils Den State Park	
Arkansas	Washington	Brentwood	255.9	411.8		AR 74 east	
Arkansas	Washington	West Fork	264.2	425.2		AR 170 west to I-49 – West Fork Business District, Devils Den State Park	
Arkansas	Washington	Fayetteville	270.8	435.8		AR 156 east (Willoughby Road)	
Arkansas	Washington	Fayetteville	271.3	436.6		School Avenue – Fayetteville Business District	Former US 71B
Arkansas	Washington	Fayetteville	271.3	436.6	Southern end of freeway section		
Arkansas	Washington	Fayetteville	272.0	437.7	60	I-49 south / AR 16 east (Razorback Road) / AR 265 south (Cato Springs Road)	Northbound exit and southbound entrance
Arkansas	Washington	Fayetteville	272.6	438.7	61	I-49 south / AR 16 east / AR 265 south – Fort Smith	Southbound exit and northbound entrance; southern end of I-49 concurrency; AR 16/AR 265 not signed
Arkansas	See I-49						
Arkansas	Benton	Bentonville	303.2	488.0	91	I-49 north – Bentonville, Gravette, Joplin, MO	Northern end of I-49 concurrency; access to Bentonville via North Walton Boulevard
Arkansas	Benton	Bentonville	303.2	488.0	Northern end of freeway section		
Arkansas	Benton	Bella Vista	307.6	495.0	98	AR 340 (Lancashire Boulevard)	Interchange
Arkansas	Benton	Bella Vista	310.0	498.9		US 71 north – Joplin	Continuation into Missouri
1.000 mi = 1.609 km; 1.000 km = 0.621 mi: Concurrency terminus; Incomplete access; Unopened

== See also ==
- National Register of Historic Places listings in Little River County, Arkansas
- National Register of Historic Places listings in Sebastian County, Arkansas
- National Register of Historic Places listings in Sevier County, Arkansas
- National Register of Historic Places listings in Washington County, Arkansas

== Notes ==
U.S. Route 71
Previous state: Louisiana	Arkansas	Next state: Texas
Previous state: Texas	Arkansas	Next state: Missouri
