= Arkansas Highway 272 =

State highway in Arkansas, United States

Highway 272
- AR 272 highlighted in red

Route information
- Maintained by ArDOT

Section 1
- Length: 2.06 mi (3.32 km)
- East end: US 71B in Waldron
- West end: Waldron Municipal Airport

Section 2
- Length: 1.58 mi (2.54 km)
- West end: AR 88 in Queen Wilhelmina State Park
- East end: US 59 / US 270

Location
- Country: United States
- State: Arkansas
- Counties: Polk, Scott

Highway system
- Arkansas Highway System; Interstate; US; State; Business; Spurs; Suffixed; Scenic; Heritage
| ← US 271 | → AR 273 |

Highway 272 (AR 272, Ark. 272, and Hwy. 272) is a designation for two east–west state highways in the Ouachita Mountains region of western Arkansas. One segment of 2.06 miles (3.32 km) runs west from U.S. Route 71 Business (US 71B) in Waldron to the Waldron Municipal Airport. (Note: Although Arkansas highways normally run from south to north and from west to east, the Route Log Database indicates that Highway 272 begins at Highway 71B and runs west.) A second route of 1.58 miles (2.54 km) begins at US 59/US 270 at Rich Mountain and runs west to Highway 88 at Queen Wilhelmina State Park. Both routes are owned and maintained by the Arkansas Department of Transportation (ArDOT).

== Route description ==
=== Waldron to Waldron Municipal Airport ===
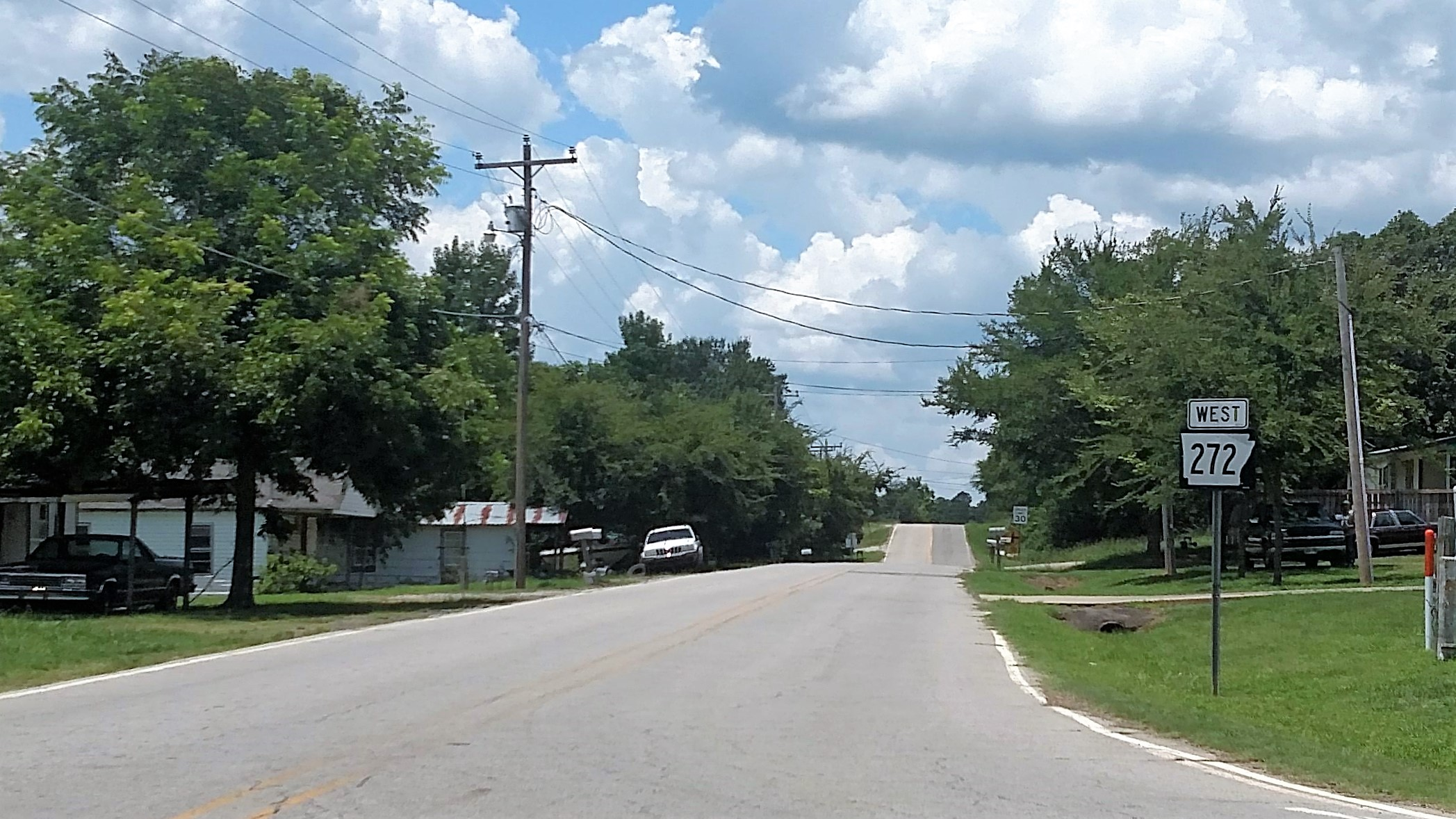
Highway 272 runs west in Waldron

The highway begins at US 71B (Main St) in Waldron and runs west as Crumptown Rd. The highway has a brief overlap with US 71, called an officially designated exception. (Note: Map note for officially designated exception: 1.18-1.29 0.11 MI EXCEPTION OVER U.S. 71) Following this overlap, the highway breaks west and terminates at the Waldron Municipal Airport.

=== Queen Wilhelmina State Park to US 59/US 270 ===
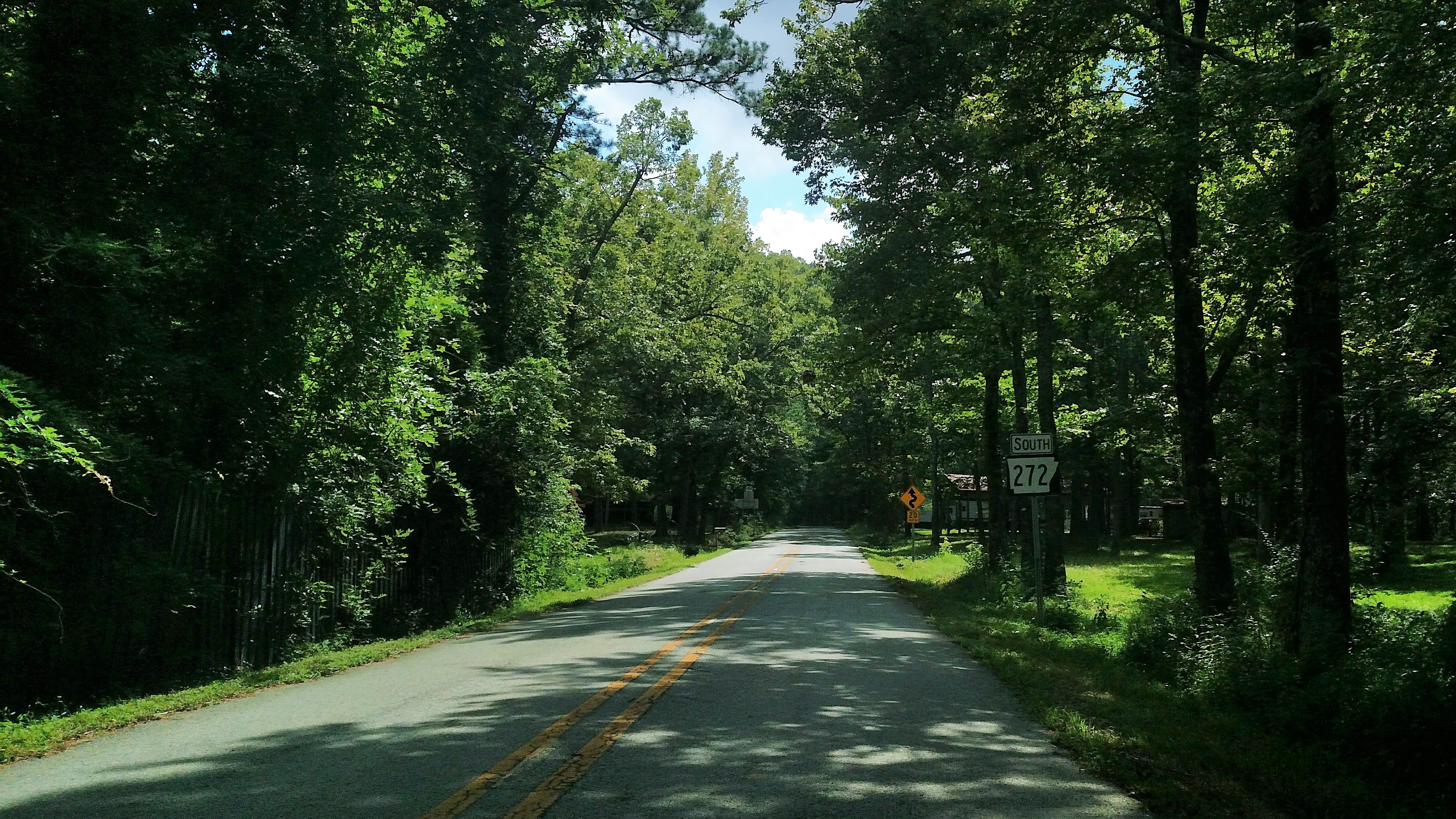
Highway 272 runs south near Rich Mountain

The highway begins about 12 miles (19 km) northwest of Mena and is within Polk County for its entire length. The western terminus of the route is at Highway 88 in Queen Wilhelmina State Park, near the summit of Rich Mountain. The eastern terminus is at the concurrency of U.S. Route 270 and U.S. Route 59. The highway gains over 650 feet (200 m) along its course.

== History ==
The segment between Waldron and the airport was adopted as a state highway by the Arkansas State Highway Commission on March 28, 1973.

== Major intersections ==
| County | Location | mi | km | Destinations | Notes |
|---|---|---|---|---|---|
| Scott | Waldron | 0.00 | 0.00 | US 71B (Main St) | Eastern terminus |
| Scott | Waldron | 1.18– 1.29 | 1.90– 2.08 | US 71 – Fort Smith, Y City | Officially designated exception |
| Scott | | 2.06 | 3.32 | Waldron Municipal Airport | Western terminus |
Highway 272 begins in at US 59/US 270
| Polk | | 0.00 | 0.00 | AR 88 – Mena, Queen Wilhelmina State Park | Western terminus |
| Polk | Rich Mountain | 1.58 | 2.54 | US 59 / US 270 – Mena, Heavener, OK | Eastern terminus |
1.000 mi = 1.609 km; 1.000 km = 0.621 mi: Concurrency terminus

== See also ==
- Arkansas Highway 980, the traditional highway designation for airport roads in Arkansas
