= Arkansas Highway 375 =

State highway in Arkansas, United States

Highway 375

Route information
- Maintained by ArDOT

Section 1
- Length: 8.09 mi (13.02 km)
- West end: US 59 / US 71 at Potter Junction
- East end: AR 8 in Mena

Section 2
- Length: 11.62 mi (18.70 km)
- North end: AR 8 near Mena
- South end: CR 630 in the Ouachita National Forest

Location
- Country: United States
- State: Arkansas
- Counties: Polk

Highway system
- Arkansas Highway System; Interstate; US; State; Business; Spurs; Suffixed; Scenic; Heritage
| ← AR 374 | → AR 376 |

Highway 375 (AR 375, Ark. 375, and Hwy. 375) is a designation for one east-west and one north–south state highway in Polk County, Arkansas. A western route of 8.09 miles (13.02 km) runs east from U.S. Route 59/U.S. Route 71 (US 59/US 71) at Potter Junction to Highway 8 in Mena. A second route of 11.62 miles (18.70 km) begins at Highway 8 outside of Mena and runs south beyond County Road 630 to Shady, Arkansas, in the Ouachita National Forest. (Note: Although Arkansas highways normally run from south to north and from west to east, the Polk County Route and Sections Map indicates that Highway 375 begins at Highway 8 and runs south.)

== Route description ==
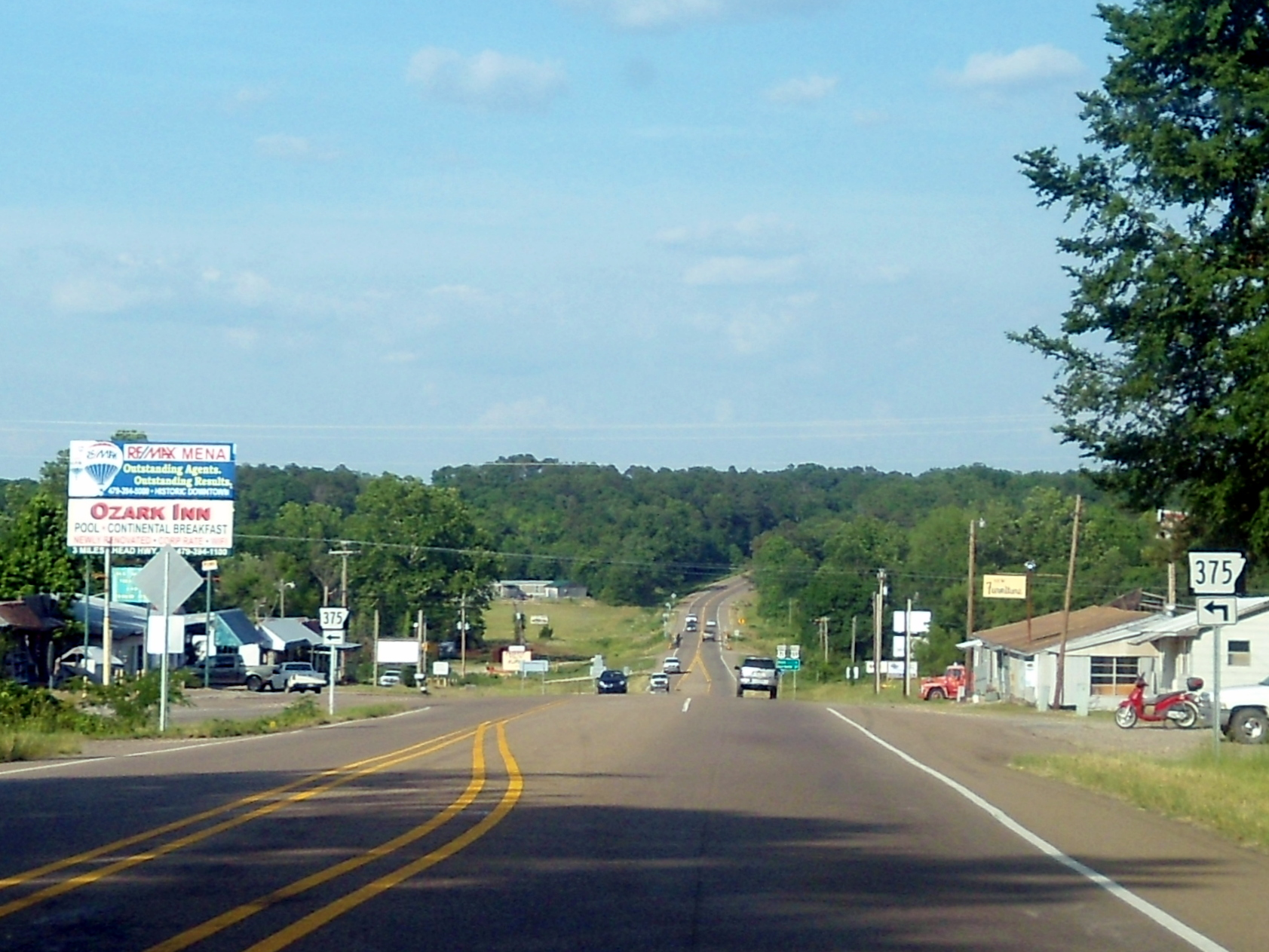
Highway 375 western terminus at US 59/US 71 at Potter Junction.

=== Potter Junction to Mena ===
Highway 375 begins at US 59/US 71 at Potter Junction. The route runs west through farms and wooded areas before turning north to Potter. Highway 375 turns east and follows old US 71 to its end at Highway 8 in Mena.

=== Mena to Shady ===
Highway 375 begins at Highway 8 outside of Mena and runs southeast through Dallas. The route continues southeast to enter the Ouachita National Forest where it becomes a narrow road with almost no shoulder and limited signage. 375 has many sharp turns as it crosses the mountain and is NOT passable by large trucks, ie. 18 wheelers. Highway 375 terminates at County Road 81 (community of Shady). Polk County Road 64 continues East where 375 ends. CR 64 is a partial paved/dirt road that enters the forest and is not passable by large trucks.

== Major intersections ==
The entire route is in Polk County.

| Location | mi | km | Destinations | Notes |
|---|---|---|---|---|
| Potter Junction | 0.00 | 0.00 | US 59 / US 71 – Hatfield, De Queen, Mena, Fort Smith | Western terminus |
| Mena | 8.09 | 13.02 | AR 8 (Reine Street) | Eastern terminus |
Highway 375 begins outside Mena
| | 0.00 | 0.00 | AR 8 | Northern terminus |
| Ouachita National Forest | 11.62 | 18.70 | CR 630 | Southern terminus |
1.000 mi = 1.609 km; 1.000 km = 0.621 mi
