= C. E. Foster House =

Historic house in Arkansas, United States

- U.S. National Register of Historic Places
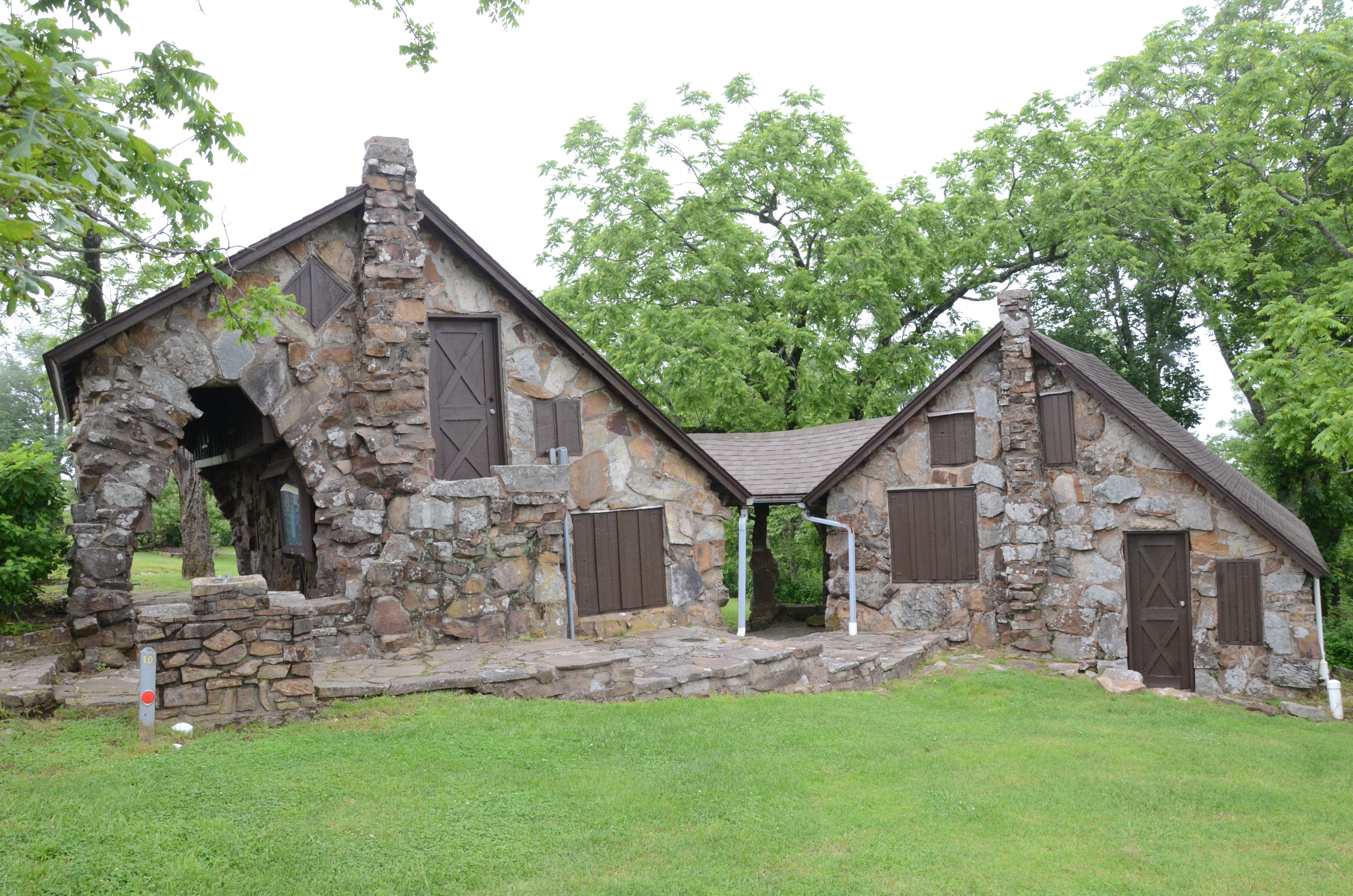

- Location within Arkansas Location within the United States
- Location: AR 88, Queen Wilhelmina State Park
- Nearest city: Mena, Arkansas
- Coordinates: 34°41′9″N 94°22′25″W
- Area: less than one acre
- Built: 1931
- Built by: Carlos Hill, Phil Lance
- Architectural style: Rustic
- NRHP reference No.: 93000084
- Added to NRHP: February 25, 1993

The C. E. Foster House is a historic house on Skyline Drive (Arkansas Highway 88) in Queen Wilhelmina State Park, located in central western Arkansas. It is a rustic stone structure, with two parts connected by a breezeway, located just outside the park entrance on the north side of the highway. It was built in 1931 by Carlos Hill and Phil Lance, and sold soon afterward to C. E. Foster, an Oklahoma oil businessman, who bought it for use as a summer house. It is one of four houses built by Hill on Rich Mountain, and is the best-preserved of the two that survive. In the 1960s the house was operated as a tourist attraction known as the "Wonder House"; it was taken over by the state in 1971.

The house was listed on the National Register of Historic Places in 1993.

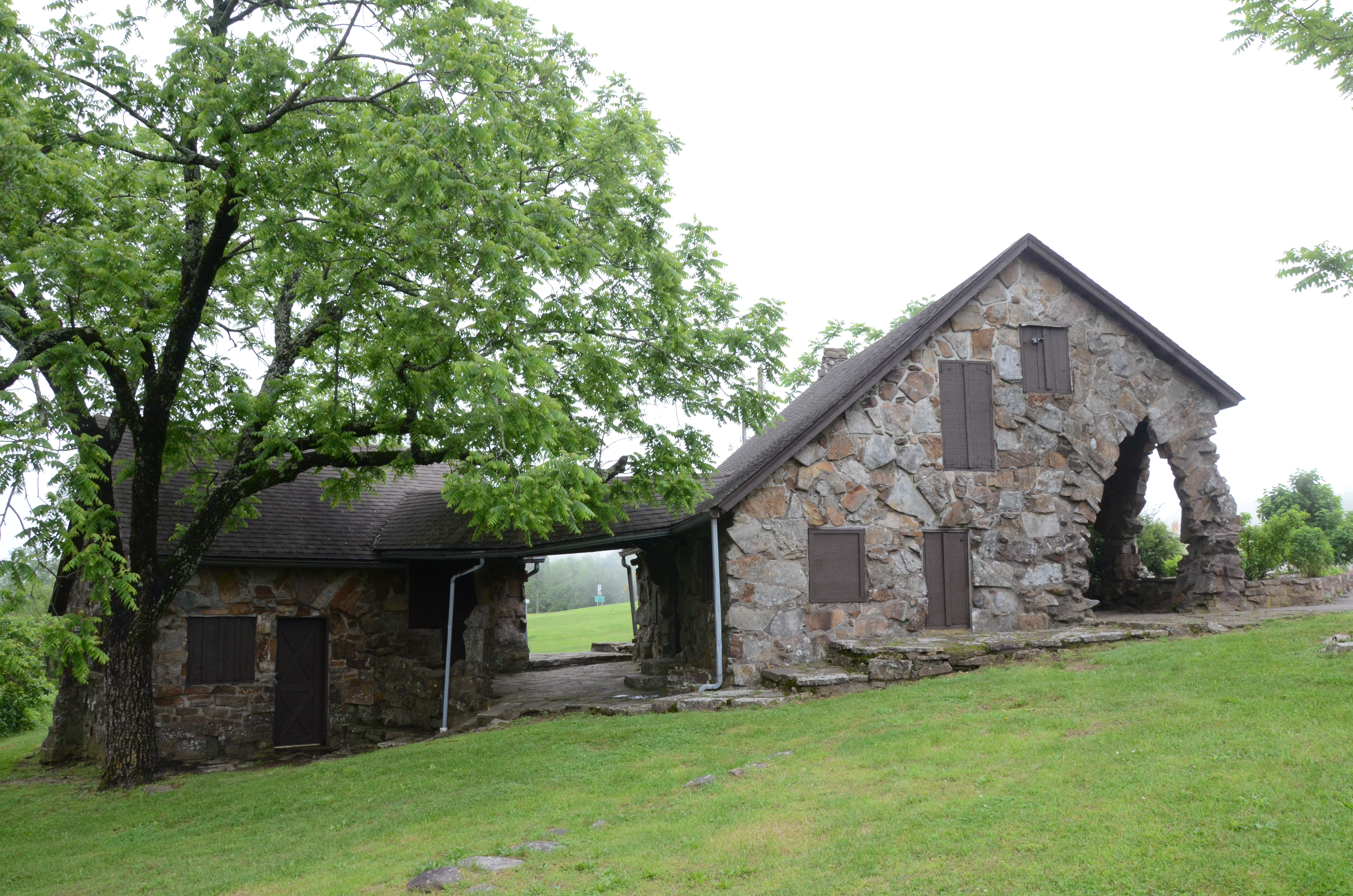
Back side

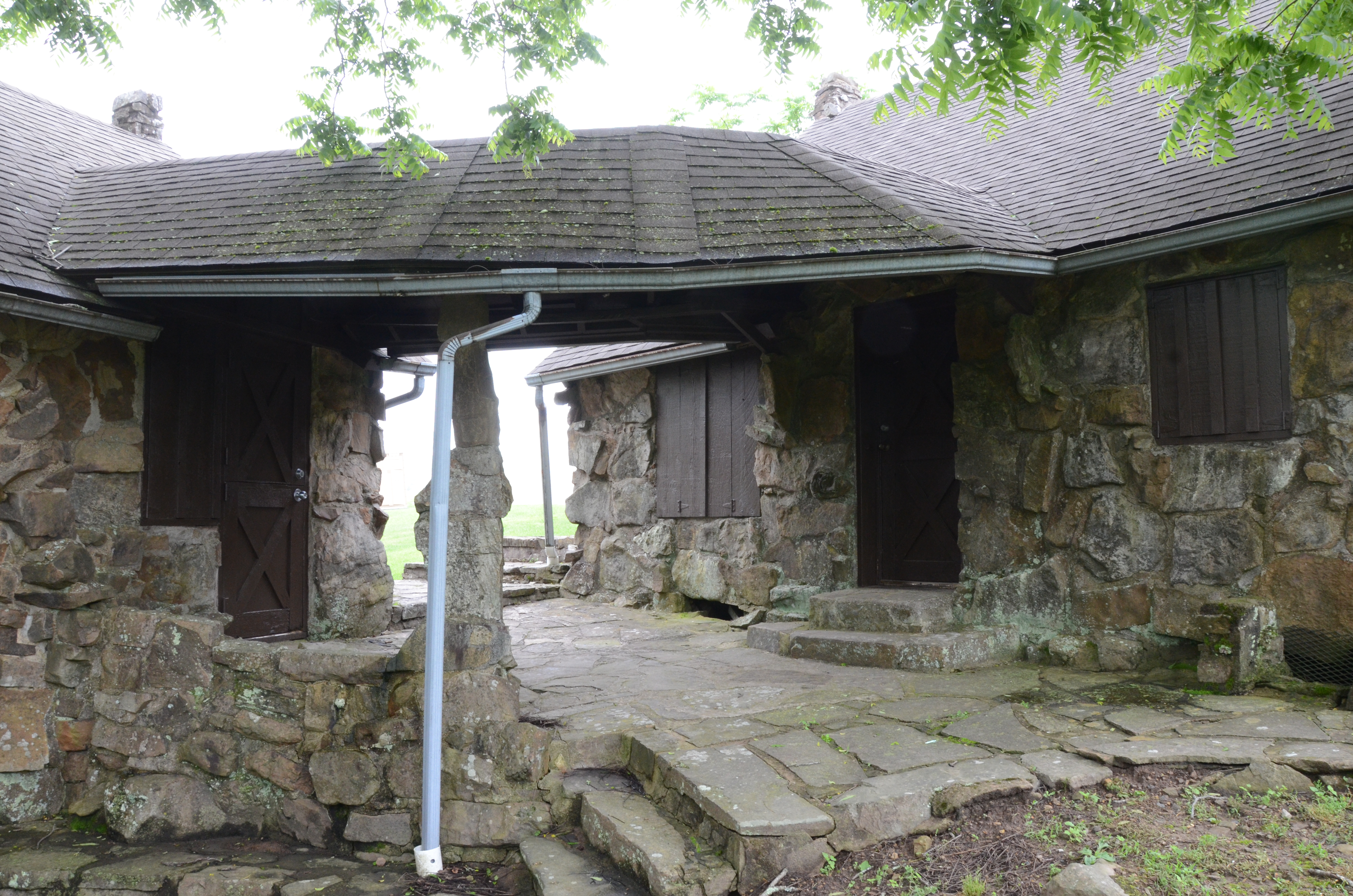
Breezeway

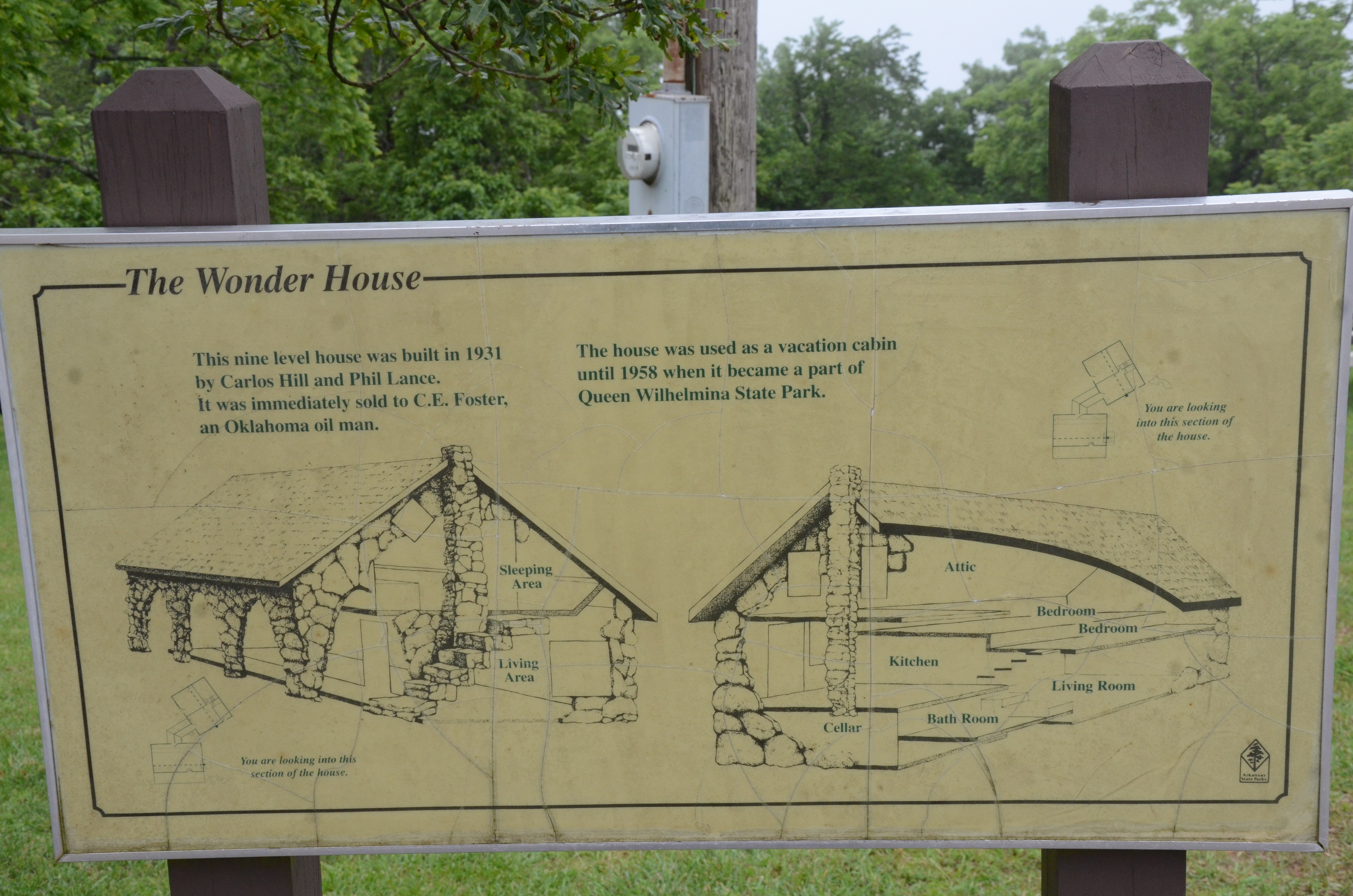
Information board

== See also ==
- National Register of Historic Places listings in Polk County, Arkansas
