= Old Potter, Arkansas =

- Unincorporated community
- Potter Junction's position in Arkansas Old Potter, Arkansas (the United States)
- Coordinates: 34°33′2″N 94°18′22″W
- Country: United States
- State: Arkansas
- County: Polk
- Township: Potter
- Elevation: 1,027 ft (313 m)
- Time zone: UTC-6 (Central (CST))
  - Summer (DST): UTC-5 (CDT)
- ZIP code: 71953
- Area code: 870
- GNIS feature ID: 73178

Old Potter, also known as Potter Junction, is an unincorporated community in Potter Township, Polk County, Arkansas, United States. It is located along U.S. Route 59/U.S. Route 71 south of Mena, where Highway 375 (AR 375) begins. The community of Potter is 2 miles (3.2 km) west on AR 375, where it meets the Kansas City Southern Railway.
