= Rich Mountain (Arkansas–Oklahoma) =

Mountain in Arkansas and Oklahoma, U.S.

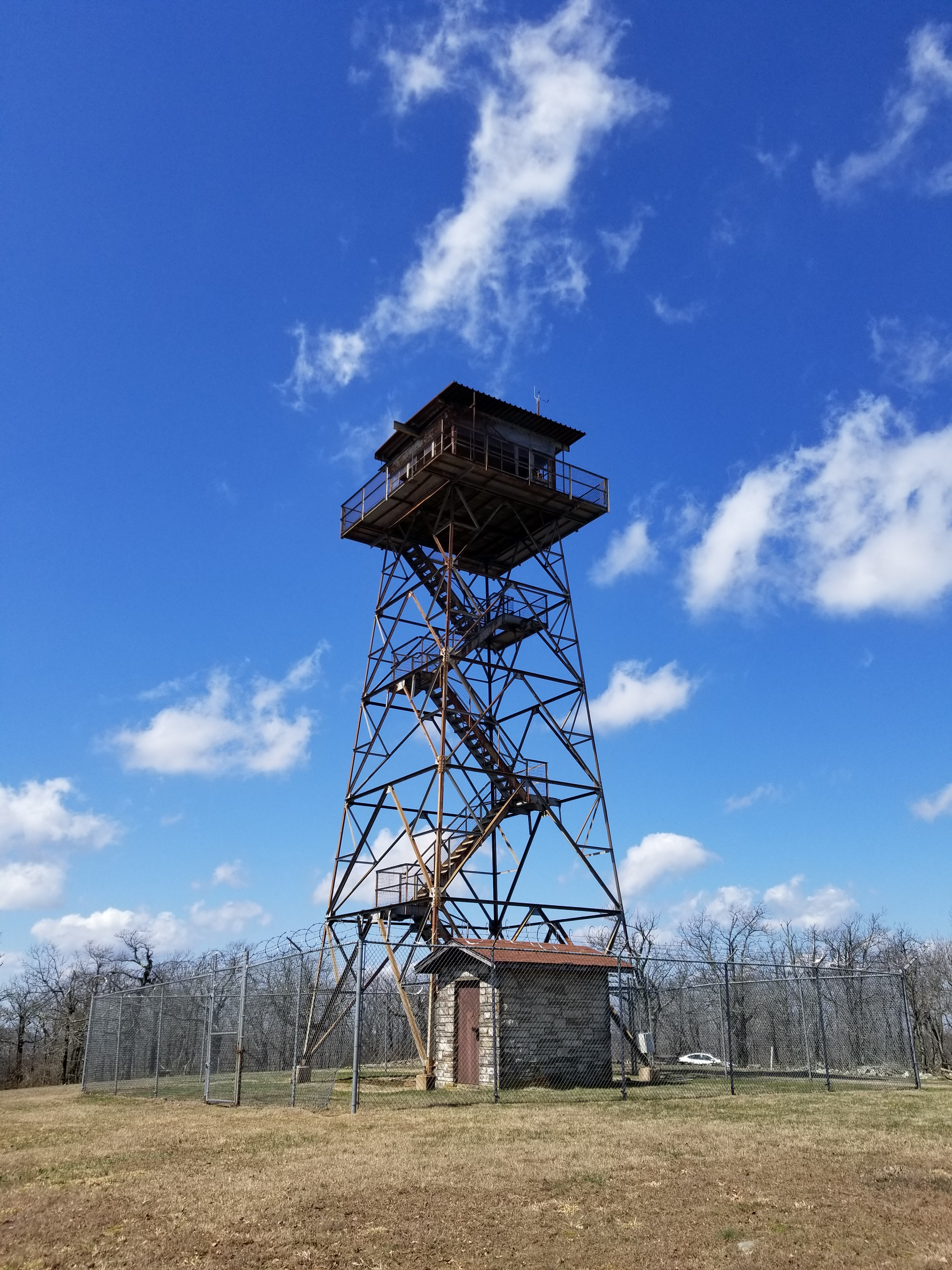
- Rich Mountain Lookout Tower as viewed from the parking lot

Highest point
- Elevation: 2,681 ft (817 m)
- Listing: Arkansas County High Points #2
- Coordinates: 34°40′27.91″N 94°19′44.98″W

Geography
- Location: Queen Wilhelmina State Park, Polk County, Arkansas, United States
- Parent range: Ouachita Mountains

Rich Mountain is the second highest point of the U.S. Interior Highlands and Ouachita Mountains, and in the U.S. state of Arkansas; it is also the site of Queen Wilhelmina State Park. Rich Mountain is a long, generally east–west-trending ridge composed of hard sandstone. It is located just outside of Mena, Arkansas and is intersected by the Arkansas-Oklahoma border. Atop its summit is the Rich Mountain Lookout Tower, which is approximately 2.4 mi (3.9 km) east-southeast of the Queen Wilhelmina Lodge.

Arkansas State Highway 88 and Oklahoma State Highway 1, collectively known as the Talimena Scenic Drive, traverse the entire top of Rich Mountain and provide excellent vistas of the surrounding Ouachita Mountains.
