= Arkansas Highway 100 (1926–1960) =

Former highway in Arkansas

State Road 100

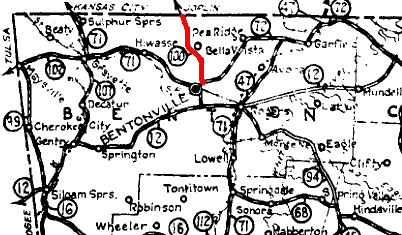

Route information
- Maintained by SHC
- Length: 11 mi (18 km)
- Existed: April 1, 1926–March 2, 1960

Major junctions
- South end: US 71 in Bentonville
- North end: Route 88 at the Missouri state line

Location
- Country: United States
- State: Arkansas
- Counties: Benton

Highway system
- Arkansas Highway System; Interstate; US; State; Business; Spurs; Suffixed; Scenic; Heritage
← AR 99	→ AR 100

State Road 100 (AR 100, Ark. 100, and Hwy. 100) is a former state highway in Northwest Arkansas. The route began at US Highway 71 (US 71) in Bentonville and ran north to Route 88 at the Missouri state line. The entire highway was supplanted by US 71 in 1960 following Missouri's construction of a new terrain route. State Road 100 was maintained by the Arkansas Highway Department (AHD), now known as the Arkansas Department of Transportation (ArDOT).

== History ==
The route was created during the 1926 Arkansas state highway numbering as an original state highway. It was deleted in 1960, following AASHTO approval of a US 71 alignment change, replacing the entire route.

== Major intersections ==
The entire route was in Benton County.

Location	mi	km	Destinations	Notes
Bentonville	0.00	0.00	US 71 (Central Avenue / A Street) – Sulphur Springs, Rogers	Southern terminus
	11	18	Route 88 at the Missouri state line	Northern terminus
1.000 mi = 1.609 km; 1.000 km = 0.621 mi: Concurrency terminus
