= Arkansas Highway 104 =

State highway in Arkansas, United States

Highway 104

Route information
- Maintained by ArDOT
- Length: 4.66 mi (7.50 km)

Major junctions
- West end: US 270
- I-530 / US 65
- East end: AR 365

Location
- Country: United States
- State: Arkansas
- Counties: Jefferson

Highway system
- Arkansas Highway System; Interstate; US; State; Business; Spurs; Suffixed; Scenic; Heritage
← AR 103	→ AR 105

Highway 104 (AR 104, Ark. 104, and Hwy. 104) is an east–west state highway in Jefferson County, Arkansas. The route of 4.66 miles (7.50 km) is located west of Pine Bluff and serves as a connection to Interstate 530 (I-530) for US Highway 270 (US 270) to the south and Highway 365 to the north.

== Route description ==
Highway 104 begins at US 270 and runs due north as a section line road to an interchange with I-530/US 65. North of this interchange the route has a junction with Highway 365, where it terminates. This northern terminus is at the edge of the Pine Bluff Arsenal.

Despite being an entirely north–south alignment, the highway ends in an even number and therefore is considered east–west by the Arkansas State Highway and Transportation Department (AHTD). The route is entirely two-lane undivided.

== Major intersections ==
The entire route is in Jefferson County.

Location	mi	km	Destinations	Notes
Hardin	0.00	0.00	US 270 – Pine Bluff, Sheridan	Western terminus
	2.14	3.44	I-530 / US 65 – Little Rock, Pine Bluff	Exit 30 (I-530)
Samples	4.66	7.50	AR 365 – Redfield, White Hall	Eastern terminus; former US 65
1.000 mi = 1.609 km; 1.000 km = 0.621 mi

== See also ==
- List of state highways in Arkansas
