= Pencil Bluff, Arkansas =

- Census-designated place
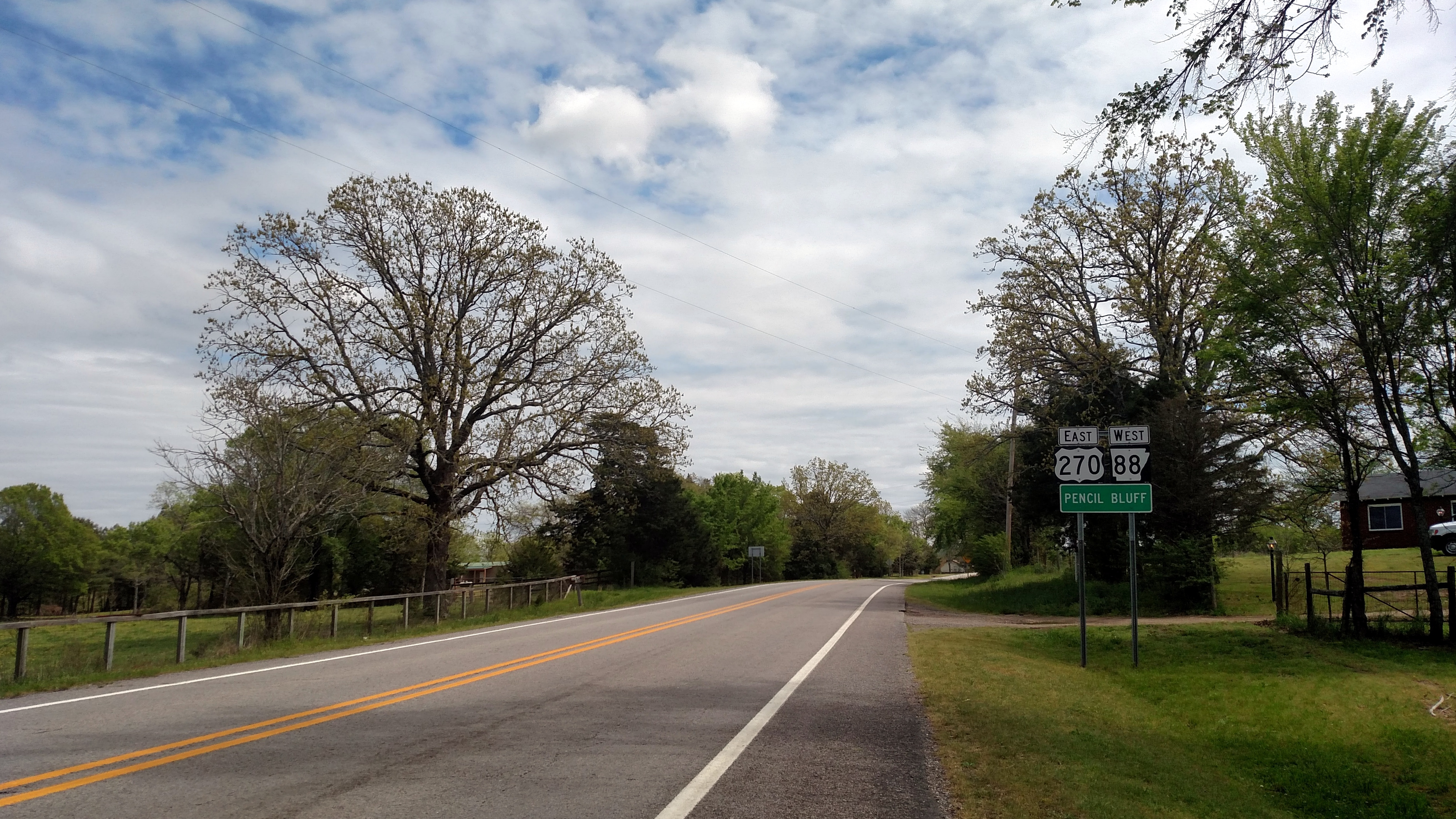
- Entering Pencil Bluff from the west

- Location within Arkansas Location within the United States
- Coordinates: 34°37′35″N 93°44′04″W
- Country: United States
- State: Arkansas
- County: Montgomery

Area
  - Total: 0.53 sq mi (1.4 km^{2})
  - Land: 0.53 sq mi (1.4 km^{2})
  - Water: 0.0 sq mi (0 km^{2})
- Elevation: 748 ft (228 m)

Population (2020)
  - Total: 72
- Time zone: UTC-6 (Central (CST))
  - Summer (DST): UTC-5 (CDT)
- ZIP code: 71965
- Area code: 870
- GNIS feature ID: 2805676
- FIPS code: 05-54410

Pencil Bluff is an unincorporated community and census-designated place (CDP) in Montgomery County, Arkansas, United States. Pencil Bluff is located at the junction of U.S. Route 270 and Arkansas Highway 88, 7.5 miles (12.1 km) northwest of Mount Ida. It was first listed as a CDP in the 2020 census with a population of 72

Pencil Bluff has a post office with ZIP code 71965.

2026 Pulitzer Prize winning journalist, Ginny Monk is a native of Pencil Bluff.

== Demographics ==
Historical population
Census	Pop.	Note	%±
2020	72		—
U.S. Decennial Census; 2020

=== 2020 census ===
Pencil Bluff CDP, Arkansas – Demographic Profile (NH = Non-Hispanic) Note: the US Census treats Hispanic/Latino as an ethnic category. This table excludes Latinos from the racial categories and assigns them to a separate category. Hispanics/Latinos may be of any race.
Race / Ethnicity	Pop 2020	% 2020
White alone (NH)	57	79.17%
Black or African American alone (NH)	0	0.00%
Native American or Alaska Native alone (NH)	2	2.78%
Asian alone (NH)	2	2.78%
Pacific Islander alone (NH)	0	0.00%
Some Other Race alone (NH)	0	0.00%
Mixed Race/Multi-Racial (NH)	5	6.94%
Hispanic or Latino (any race)	6	8.33%
Total	72	100.00%
