= Arkansas Highway 88 =

State highway in Arkansas, United States

Highway 88

Route information
- Maintained by ArDOT

Location
- Country: United States
- State: Arkansas
- Counties: Polk, Montgomery, Garland, Saline, Jefferson

Highway system
- Arkansas Highway System; Interstate; US; State; Business; Spurs; Suffixed; Scenic; Heritage
← AR 87	→ AR 89

Arkansas Highway 88 (AR 88) is a designation for five state highways in Arkansas. All routes are maintained by the Arkansas Department of Transportation (ArDOT).

== Oklahoma to Washita ==
Highway 88
- Location: SH-1, Oklahoma state line to AR 27 at Washita
- Length: 60.66 mi (97.62 km)
- Existed: April 1, 1926–present

Highway 88 (AR 88, Ark. 88, and Hwy. 88) is a state highway of 60.66 miles (97.62 km) in Western Arkansas. The route begins at the Oklahoma state line as a continuation of OK-1 and runs west to Highway 27 at Washita. Between the western terminus and Mena, the route passes through the Ouachita Mountains and is designated as part of the Talimena Scenic Drive, an Arkansas Scenic Byway and National Scenic Byway.

=== Route description ===
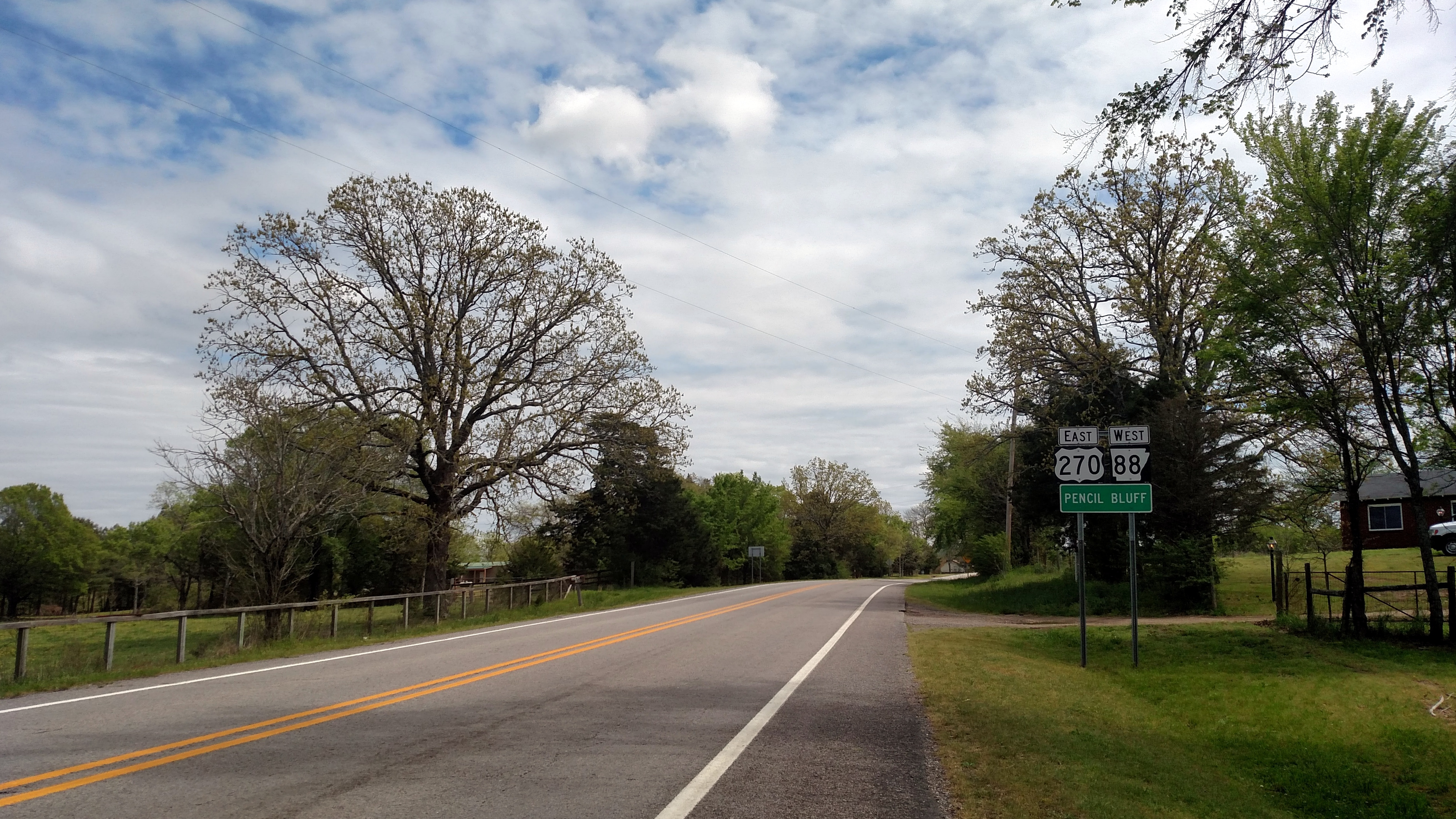
Highway 88 overlaps US 270 in Pencil Bluff

At Mena, it runs along the north direction of U.S. Route 71 (geographically east) for 2 miles (3.2 km) until US 71 turns back to the north. From there, Highway 88 continues east for 24 miles (39 km) parallelling the Ouachita River and passing through the communities of Ink, Cherry Hill, Pine Ridge and Oden before intersecting U.S. Route 270 (US 270) at Pencil Bluff. Highway 88 then continues east another 14 miles (23 km) passing through the community of Sims before ending at Highway 27 at Washita.

=== Major intersections ===
Mile markers reset at some concurrencies.

County	Location	mi	km	Destinations	Notes
Polk		0.00	0.00	SH-1 west (Talimena Scenic Drive)	Continuation into Oklahoma
Polk	Queen Wilhelmina State Park	5.47	8.80	AR 272 east	AR 272 western terminus
Polk	Mena	17.53– 0.00	28.21– 0.00	US 59 / US 71 (Pickering Avenue) – Ashdown, Waldron	
Montgomery	Oden	26.71	42.99	AR 379 south – Oden Access Ouachita River	AR 379 northern terminus
Montgomery	Pencil Bluff	29.46– 29.81	47.41– 47.97	US 270 – Mount Ida, Hot Springs, Y City	Officially designated exception
Montgomery	Sims	33.52	53.95	AR 298 east	AR 298 western terminus
Montgomery	Washita	43.13	69.41	AR 27 – Danville, Mount Ida	Eastern terminus
1.000 mi = 1.609 km; 1.000 km = 0.621 mi: Concurrency terminus

== Hot Springs ==
Higdon Ferry Road
- Location: AR 7 in Hot Springs to AR 7 in Hot Springs
- Length: 2.92 mi (4.70 km)

=== Route description ===
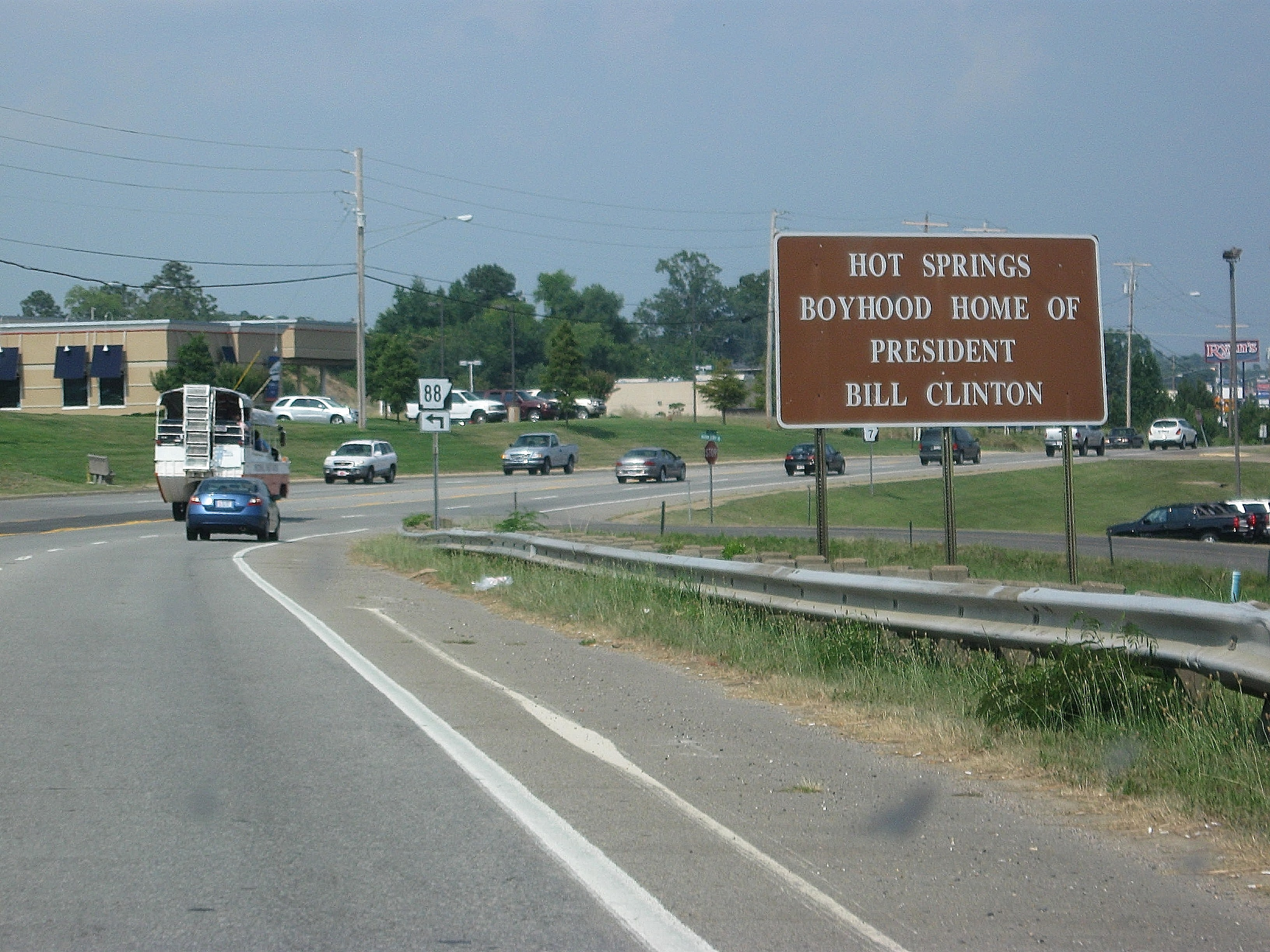
Highway 88 junction sign on Highway 7 at Hot Springs.

Highway 88 begins and ends at Highway 7 in Hot Springs. It runs about 3 miles and has an intersection with the US 70-270 bypass of Hot Springs along its route.

=== Major intersections ===
The entire route is in Hot Springs, Garland County.

mi	km	Destinations	Notes
0.00	0.00	AR 7 (Central Avenue) – Arkadelphia	Western terminus
1.51	2.43	US 70 / US 270 – Malvern, Mount Ida	US 70 / US 270 exit 4
2.92	4.70	AR 7 (Central Avenue)	Eastern terminus
1.000 mi = 1.609 km; 1.000 km = 0.621 mi

== Lonsdale ==
Highway 88
- Location: Spring Street in Lonsdale to US 70 near Lonsdale
- Length: 1.84 mi (2.96 km)

=== Major intersections ===
County	Location	mi	km	Destinations	Notes
Garland	Lonsdale	0.00	0.00	Spring Street	Continuation west
Garland	Lonsdale	0.50	0.80	To AR 171 south	Access via Strauss Street
Saline		1.84	2.96	US 70 – Hot Springs, Benton	Eastern terminus
1.000 mi = 1.609 km; 1.000 km = 0.621 mi

== Benton ==
Highway 88
- Location: AR 35 in Benton to Alcoa Boulevard in Benton
- Length: 2.60 mi (4.18 km)

=== Route description ===
A second segment of Highway 88 begins at an intersection with Highway 35 in Benton, runs for a few blocks on Military Road (a former route of US 67-70 and US 70C/I-30 BL), then runs east approximately 2 1/2 miles as Alcoa Boulevard, with state maintenance ending at Benton Parkway.

=== Major intersections ===
The entire route is in Benton, Saline County.

mi	km	Destinations	Notes
0.00	0.00	AR 35 (Carpenter Street / East Street)	Western terminus
2.60	4.18	Alcoa Boulevard	Continuation east
1.000 mi = 1.609 km; 1.000 km = 0.621 mi

== Altheimer to Reydell ==
Highway 88
- Location: US 79B in Altheimer to AR 11 at Reydell
- Length: 23.39 mi (37.64 km)

=== Route description ===
Highway 88 begins at U.S. Route 79 (US 79) at Altheimer and runs 24 miles (39 km) south and east passing through the communities of Cornerstone, Sweden, and Swan Lake before ending at Highway 11 at Reydell.

=== Major intersections ===
The entire route is in Jefferson County.

Location	mi	km	Destinations	Notes
Altheimer	0.00	0.00	US 79B (Front Street)	Western terminus
Reydell	23.39	37.64	AR 11 north	Eastern terminus; AR 11 southern terminus
1.000 mi = 1.609 km; 1.000 km = 0.621 mi

== See also ==
- List of state highways in Arkansas
