= Queen Wilhelmina State Park =

Park in Arkansas, USA

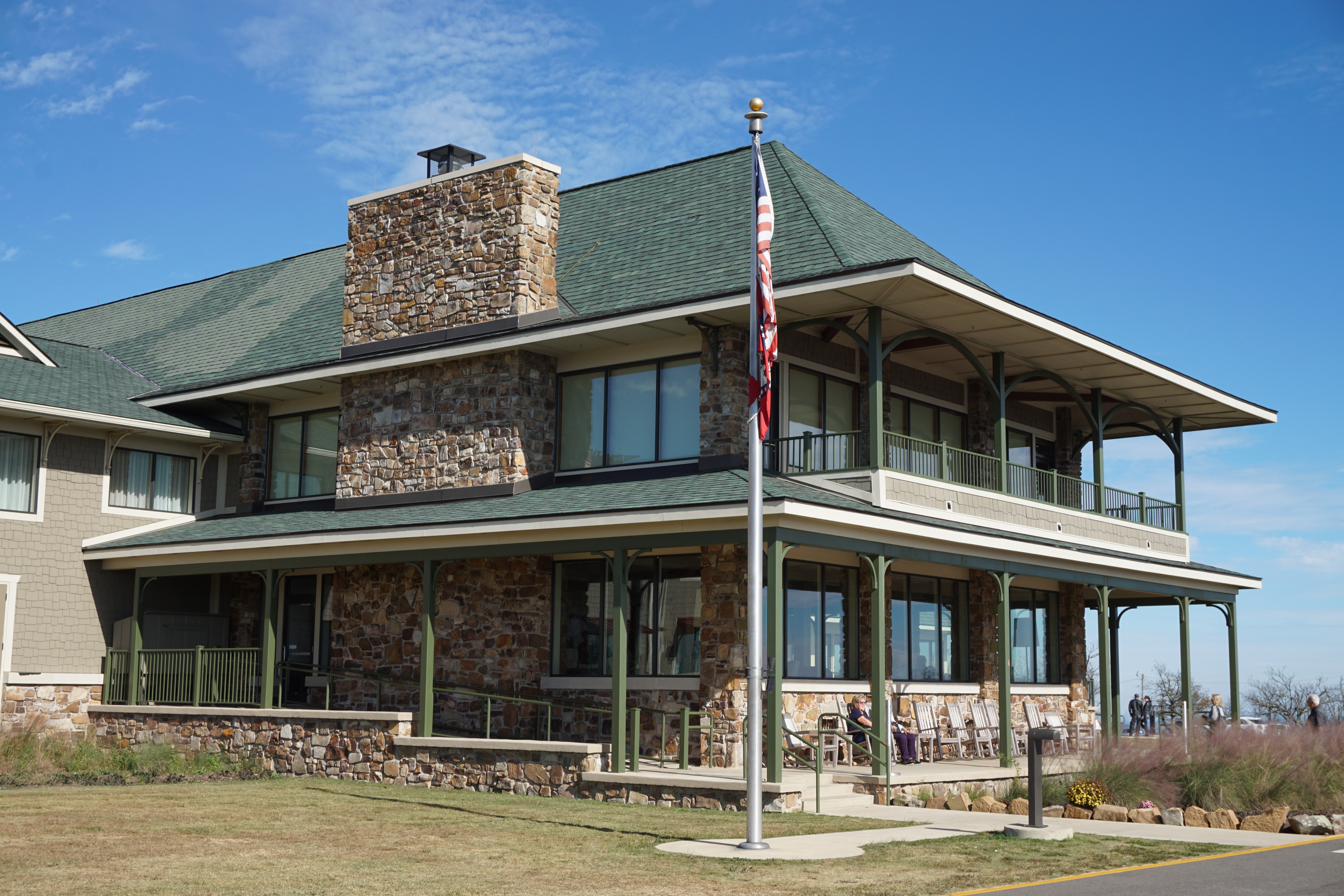
- Park lodge

- Location within Arkansas Location within the United States
- Interactive map of Queen Wilhelmina State Park
- Location: Polk County, Arkansas, United States
- Coordinates: 34°41′05″N 94°22′09″W
- Area: 460 acres (190 ha)
- Elevation: 2,516 feet (767 m)
- Established: 1957
- Administrator: Arkansas Department of Parks, Heritage and Tourism
- Website: Official website
- Arkansas State Parks

Queen Wilhelmina State Park is a unit of Arkansas Department of Parks and Tourism in the Ouachita Mountains.

The original "Castle in the Sky" lodge was built in 1898 on 2,681-foot Rich Mountain, in Polk County, Arkansas. The park is on Talimena Scenic Drive — northwest of Mena, Arkansas and east of the Oklahoma state line. It is the only lodge open on the 235 mile Ouachita Trail. It is located on Arkansas’ second highest peak, Rich Mountain.

The lodge has 40 guest rooms, a restaurant, a lobby and meeting room. The campground and trails remained open during the renovation. The park is one of the park system's eight mountain parks.

== History ==
The original lodge was built by the Kansas City, Pittsburg and Gulf Railroad to house passengers. Many of the railroad's investors were Dutch, so the lodge was named to honor Queen Wilhelmina of the Netherlands, who was to be crowned in September 1898. Grand opening of the Victorian lodge was June 22, 1898. Wilhelmina Inn was soon nicknamed the "Castle in the Sky."

The KCPG railroad faced financial problems, and was sold to what later became the Kansas City Southern Railway. The original inn fell into disrepair, and permanently closed in 1910.

Interest in tourism rose after World War II. State Act 76 of 1957 created Queen Wilhelmina State Park. A new lodge was built and opened June 22, 1963. It used some of the original rock work. It operated 10 years, until a Nov. 10, 1973 kitchen fire spread and destroyed the lodge. There was no loss of life in the fire. The park ranger notified the guests that there had been a fire and that they needed to evacuate as a precaution which saved a panic amongst the guests. The only thing left standing by the morning light was the rock walls.

Construction soon began on the site's third lodge. The $3 million lodge, re-opened in 1975. The refurbished lodge reopened in 2015.

== See also ==
- C.E. Foster House
