= Potter, Arkansas =

- Unincorporated community
- Location within Arkansas Location within the United States
- Coordinates: 34°33′13″N 94°20′21″W
- Country: United States
- State: Arkansas
- County: Polk
- Elevation: 932 ft (284 m)
- Time zone: UTC-6 (Central (CST))
  - Summer (DST): UTC-5 (CDT)
- Area code: 479
- GNIS feature ID: 78086

Potter (also New Potter, Rust) is an unincorporated community in Polk County, Arkansas, United States.
