= Y City, Arkansas =

Place in Arkansas, United States

Coordinates: 34°44′05″N 94°04′38″W

Y City
- Unincorporated community
- Location in Arkansas
- Country: United States
- State: Arkansas
- County: Scott County

Y City is an unincorporated community in Scott County, Arkansas, United States. It is located at the junction of U.S. Highway 71 and U.S. Highway 270 in the southern part of the county on Mill Creek. The namesake comes from the junction. Interstate 49 is planned to cross US 71 southeast of Y City.

== See also ==
- Y-Bridge (Zanesville, Ohio)
