= National Register of Historic Places listings in Polk County, Arkansas =

Location of Polk County in Arkansas

This is a list of the National Register of Historic Places listings in Polk County, Arkansas.

This is intended to be a complete list of the properties and districts on the National Register of Historic Places in Polk County, Arkansas, United States. The locations of National Register properties and districts for which the latitude and longitude coordinates are included below, may be seen in a map.

There are 32 properties and districts listed on the National Register in the county. Another two properties were once listed but have been removed.

Contents: Counties in Arkansas
- Arkansas
- Ashley
- Baxter
- Benton
- Boone
- Bradley
- Calhoun
- Carroll
- Chicot
- Clark
- Clay
- Cleburne
- Cleveland
- Columbia
- Conway
- Craighead
- Crawford
- Crittenden
- Cross
- Dallas
- Desha
- Drew
- Faulkner
- Franklin
- Fulton
- Garland
- Grant
- Greene
- Hempstead
- Hot Spring
- Howard
- Independence
- Izard
- Jackson
- Jefferson
- Johnson
- Lafayette
- Lawrence
- Lee
- Lincoln
- Little River
- Logan
- Lonoke
- Madison
- Marion
- Miller
- Mississippi
- Monroe
- Montgomery
- Nevada
- Newton
- Ouachita
- Perry
- Phillips
- Pike
- Poinsett
- Polk
- Pope
- Prairie
- Pulaski (Little Rock)
- Randolph
- St. Francis
- Saline
- Scott
- Searcy
- Sebastian
- Sevier
- Sharp
- Stone
- Union
- Van Buren
- Washington
- White
- Woodruff
- Yell

This National Park Service list is complete through NPS recent listings posted May 1, 2026.

== Current listings ==
	Name on the Register	Image	Date listed	Location	City or town	Description
1	Bard Springs Bathhouse	Bard Springs Bathhouse	October 20, 1993 (#93001073)	Forest Service Road 106, northwest of Athens, in the Caney Creek Wildlife Management Area of the Ouachita National Forest; 34°23′26″N 94°00′38″W	Athens	
2	Bard Springs Dam No. 1	Bard Springs Dam No. 1	October 21, 1993 (#93001074)	Forest Service Road 106, northwest of Athens, in the Caney Creek Wildlife Management Area of the Ouachita National Forest; 34°23′27″N 94°00′41″W	Athens	
3	Bard Springs Dam No. 2	Bard Springs Dam No. 2	October 21, 1993 (#93001075)	Forest Service Road 106, northwest of Athens, in the Caney Creek Wildlife Management Area of the Ouachita National Forest; 34°23′26″N 94°00′36″W	Athens	
4	Bard Springs Picnic Shelter		October 20, 1993 (#93001076)	Forest Service Road 106, northwest of Athens, in the Caney Creek Wildlife Management Area of the Ouachita National Forest; 34°23′27″N 94°00′34″W	Athens	No longer standing
5	Bogg Springs Hotel		September 30, 1993 (#93001023)	Highway 84; 34°19′45″N 94°25′40″W	Bogg Springs	Demolished in 2014 by property owners.
6	Buckeye Vista Overlook	Buckeye Vista Overlook	March 30, 2007 (#07000204)	Forest Service Road 38; 34°24′47″N 94°02′02″W	Athens	
7	Ebenezer Monument	Ebenezer Monument	January 30, 1992 (#91000689)	Junction of 9th and Church Sts. 34°35′04″N 94°14′30″W	Mena	
8	Elks Lodge	Elks Lodge	June 4, 1998 (#98000616)	500 Mena St. 34°35′09″N 94°14′16″W	Mena	
9	C.E. Foster House	C.E. Foster House	February 25, 1993 (#93000084)	Northern side of Highway 88, west of its junction with Highway 272; 34°41′09″N 94°22′25″W	Mena	
10	Heathcliff Cabin		September 14, 2021 (#100006926)	East End of Maintenance Ln., Queen Wilhelmina State Park; 34°41′06″N 94°21′54″W	Mena vicinity	
11	Janssen Park	Janssen Park	December 13, 1979 (#79000448)	Off Highway 8; 34°35′00″N 94°14′24″W	Mena	
12	Mena Commercial Historic District	Mena Commercial Historic District	July 23, 2009 (#09000321)	Mena St. between Port Arthur and Gillham Ave., Sherwood Ave. between Mena and DeQueen St., and U.S. Route 71 south of Mena; 34°35′00″N 94°14′08″W	Mena	
13	Mena Kansas City-Southern Depot	Mena Kansas City-Southern Depot	June 5, 1991 (#91000685)	West of the junction of Pickering Ave. and Mena St. 34°34′58″N 94°14′11″W	Mena	
14	Mountain Fork Bridge	Mountain Fork Bridge	April 9, 1990 (#90000540)	County Road 38 over Mountain Fork Creek; 34°31′41″N 94°24′00″W	Mena	
15	National Guard Armory	National Guard Armory	June 5, 1991 (#91000682)	Junction of DeQueen and Maple Sts. 34°35′03″N 94°14′17″W	Mena	
16	Old Post Office	Old Post Office	June 5, 1991 (#91000686)	520 N. Mena St. 34°35′03″N 94°14′17″W	Mena	
17	Old U.S. 71 Ouachita River Bridges		January 8, 2025 (#100011300)	Polk County Road 109 over the Ouachita River. 34°38′38″N 94°11′57″W	Acorn	
18	Polk County Courthouse	Polk County Courthouse	November 20, 1992 (#92001618)	Northeastern corner of the junction of Church Ave. and DeQueen St. 34°35′12″N 94°14′21″W	Mena	
19	St. Agnes Catholic Church	St. Agnes Catholic Church	June 5, 1991 (#91000696)	Junction of 8th and Walnut Sts. 34°35′11″N 94°14′33″W	Mena	
20	Shady Lake Bathhouse	Shady Lake Bathhouse	October 20, 1993 (#93001097)	County Road 64 in the Caney Creek Wildlife Management Area of the Ouachita National Forest; 34°21′41″N 94°01′51″W	Athens	
21	Shady Lake Caretaker's House	Shady Lake Caretaker's House	October 20, 1993 (#93001098)	Forest Service Road 38 in the Caney Creek Wildlife Management Area of the Ouachita National Forest; 34°21′49″N 94°02′03″W	Athens	
22	Shady Lake CCC Bridge No. 1	Shady Lake CCC Bridge No. 1	October 14, 2010 (#10000841)	Forest Service Road 38 over the South Fork of the Saline River; 34°21′39″N 94°01′24″W	Athens vicinity	Facilities Constructed by the CCC in Arkansas MPS
23	Shady Lake CCC Bridge No. 2	Shady Lake CCC Bridge No. 2	October 14, 2010 (#10000842)	Shady Lake Campground loop road over the East Fork of the Saline River; 34°22′04″N 94°01′31″W	Athens vicinity	Facilities Constructed by the CCC in Arkansas MPS
24	Shady Lake Dam	Shady Lake Dam	October 20, 1993 (#93001099)	County Road 64 in the Caney Creek Wildlife Management Area of the Ouachita National Forest; 34°21′36″N 94°01′58″W	Athens	
25	Shady Lake Picnic Pavilion	Shady Lake Picnic Pavilion	October 20, 1993 (#93001100)	Forest Service Road 38 in the Caney Creek Wildlife Management Area of the Ouachita National Forest; 34°21′38″N 94°01′44″W	Athens	
26	Shady Lake Recreation Area Historic District	Shady Lake Recreation Area Historic District	October 2, 2015 (#15000480)	Forest Service Road 38 of the Ouachita National Forest; 34°21′38″N 94°01′44″W	Athens vicinity	
27	Judge Benjamin Shaver House	Judge Benjamin Shaver House	December 6, 1979 (#79003431)	701 12th St. 34°35′00″N 94°14′41″W	Mena	
28	State Line Marker	State Line Marker	November 18, 1976 (#76000448)	17 miles northwest of Mena on Highway 88; 34°41′38″N 94°27′19″W	Mena	Extends into Le Flore County, Oklahoma
29	Studebaker Showroom	Studebaker Showroom	June 9, 2000 (#00000636)	519 Port Arthur; 34°35′02″N 94°14′12″W	Mena	
30	Sugar Creek Vista Overlook	Sugar Creek Vista Overlook	March 30, 2007 (#07000205)	Forest Service Road 38; 34°25′43″N 94°03′21″W	Athens	
31	Tall Peak Fire Tower	Tall Peak Fire Tower	October 20, 1993 (#93001077)	Forest Service Road 38A northwest of Athens in the Caney Creek Wildlife Management Area of the Ouachita National Forest; 34°23′11″N 94°02′33″W	Athens	
32	Wickes School		September 11, 2024 (#100010843)	132 Highway 278 East; 34°18′13″N 94°20′10″W	Wickes	

== Former listings ==
	Name on the Register	Image	Date listed	Date removed	Location	City or town	Description
1	Bee Mountain Fire Tower		October 20, 1993 (#93001078)	November 7, 2005	Forest Service Rd. 30 NE of Vandervoort, Ouachita National Forest	Vandervoort	Civilian Conservation Corps built in 1938
2	Scoggin House		July 18, 1978 (#78000616)	January 14, 2002	1215 Port Arthur Avenue	Mena	

== See also ==
- List of National Historic Landmarks in Arkansas
- National Register of Historic Places listings in Arkansas
