= National Guard Armory =

U.S. military reserve base

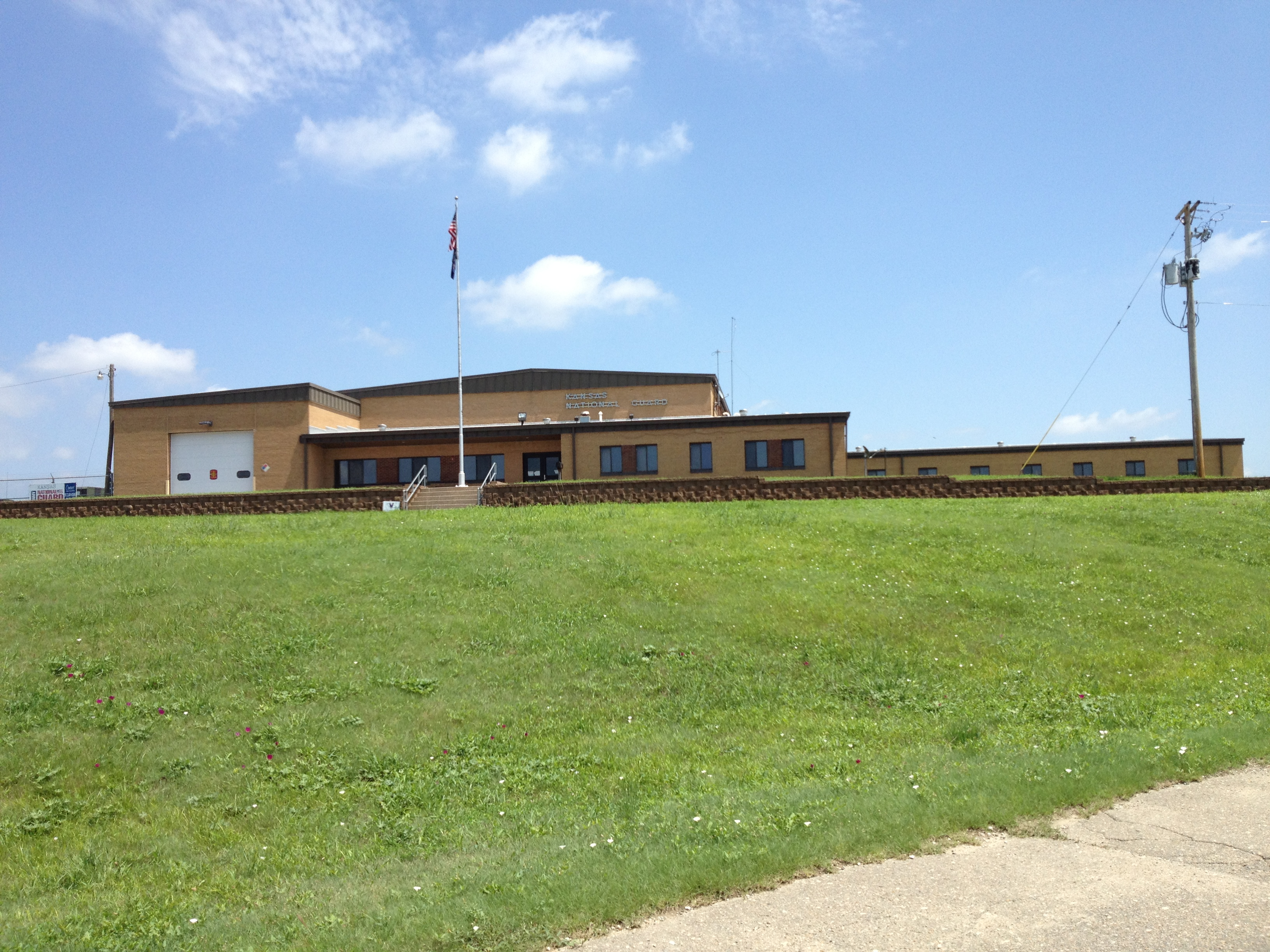
The Kansas Army National Guard armory in Concordia, Kansas is a typical building used for the National Guard programs in the United States.

A National Guard Armory, National Guard Armory Building, or National Guard Readiness Center (Note: The name readiness center is deemed to reflect the recently-expanded responsibilities of the National Guard.) is any one of numerous buildings of the U.S. National Guard where a unit trains, meets, and parades. A readiness center supports the training, administration, and logistics of National Guard units by providing assembly space, classrooms, weapons and protective personal equipment storage, and training space. Readiness centers can also be utilized as communal assembly areas, utilized by local organizations and governments.

== History ==
After World War II, the Section 5 Committee of the Office of the Chief of Staff, War Department, chaired by MG Milton Reckord, approved a policy of constructing National Guard armories using 75% federal and 25% state funding. In 1968, the Army National Guard had 2,786 armories; in 2000 the Army National Guard had 3,166 armories in 2,679 communities. In 2009, the Kansas Adjutant General's Department announced it would be closing 18 of its then-56 National Guard armories "due to state budget cuts."

A report to Congress in 2014 noted that some National Guard armories are in poor or failing condition, with "the average nationwide [Readiness Center] condition [being] fair, but bordering on poor…". The report noted that the $377 million annual expenditure for constructing and improving readiness centers would produce "major long-term risks," and recommended more than quadrupling annual funding to "get to green" on key performance indicators by completely transforming and modernizing the portfolio of readiness centers.

== Crime ==
In the 20th century, a number of national guard armories were the target of burglaries and weapons theft.

Bonnie and Clyde acquired many of the weapons used for their crime sprees, such as Browning Automatic Rifles, through theft from National Guard Armories.

Some of the burglaries were linked to radicalism, as in the case of Katherine Ann Power, who stole weapons from multiple armories in the 1970s. A particularly notable case in 1974 involved the theft of a huge arms cache from the Compton National Guard Armory in California, in which nearly 100 M-16 rifles and several rocket launchers were stolen. Several suspects were eventually arrested in 1975. The magnitude of this crime was considered analogous to most dangerous kind of terrorist threats.

In 1995, former soldier Shawn Nelson stole an M60A3 tank from a National Guard armory in San Diego and went on a rampage throughout the city until he was shot dead by police.

== Specific armories in the United States ==
- National Guard Armory (Batesville, Arkansas), listed on the NRHP in Arkansas
- National Guard Armory Building (Searcy, Arkansas), formerly listed on the NRHP in White County, Arkansas
- National Guard Armory (Mena, Arkansas), listed on the NRHP in Arkansas
- National Guard Armory-Pine Bluff, Pine Bluff, Arkansas, listed on the NRHP in Arkansas
- Decatur Armory, Georgia
- Decatur Armory, Illinois
- Flint Armory, Michigan
- Fort Homer W. Hesterly Armory, Tampa, Florida, listed on the NRHP in Florida
- Illinois National Guard First Regiment Armory II
- John W. Higgins Armory
- Old West Palm Beach National Guard Armory, West Palm Beach, Florida, listed on the NRHP in Florida
- Villisca National Guard Armory, Villisca, Iowa, listed on the NRHP in Iowa
- Minneapolis Armory, Minneapolis, Minnesota, listed on the NRHP in Minnesota
- Missouri National Guard Armory
- Kearney National Guard Armory, Kearney, Nebraska, listed on the NRHP in Buffalo County, Nebraska
- Hoosick Falls Armory, Hoosick Falls, New York
- Schenectady Armory, Schenectady, New York
- National Guard Armory (Fort Mill, South Carolina), listed on the NRHP in South Carolina
- The Houston Light Guard Armory, Houston, Texas (Now the Buffalo Soldiers National Museum), listed on the NRHP in Texas
- The D.C. Armory, a multi-use facility adjacent to RFK Stadium in Washington, D.C.
- National Guard Armory (Centralia, Washington)
- National Guard Armory 127th Regiment Infantry Company G, Oconomowoc, Wisconsin, listed on the NRHP in Wisconsin
- The Armory, St Louis

== See also ==
- List of armories and arsenals in New York City and surrounding counties
- Drill hall
- Armory (military)
