= Mena station (Arkansas) =

- Mena Kansas City-Southern Depot
- U.S. National Register of Historic Places
- U.S. Historic district – Contributing property
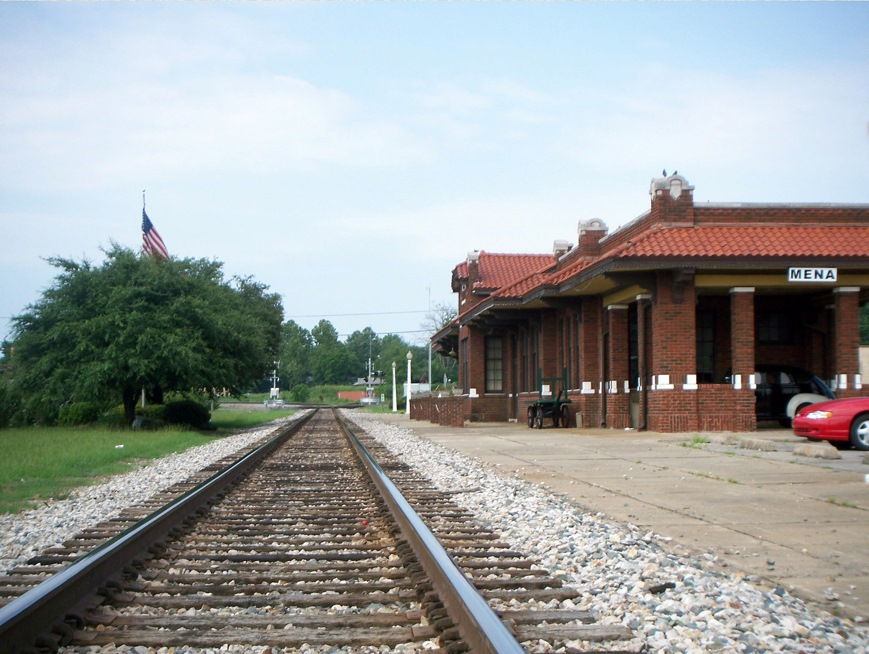

- Location within Arkansas Location within the United States
- Location: Sherwood St., Mena, Arkansas
- Coordinates: 34°34′58″N 94°14′11″W
- Area: less than one acre
- Built: November 8, 1920
- Architect: T.C. Horstman
- Architectural style: Late 19th And 20th Century Revivals, Mediterranean
- Part of: Mena Commercial Historic District (ID09000321)
- NRHP reference No.: 91000685

Significant dates
- Added to NRHP: June 5, 1991
- Designated CP: July 23, 2009

The Mena Kansas City-Southern Depot is a historic railroad station on Sherwood Street in the center of Mena, Arkansas. It is long single-story structure, built out of brick, with a tile roof and Mediterranean styling. It was built in 1920 by the Kansas City Southern Railway to designs by the company architect, T. C. Horstmann, and is one of the most elaborate surviving early-20th century railroad stations in the state. It is now owned by the city, and houses a local history museum and the local chamber of commerce.

The station was listed on the National Register of Historic Places in 1991.

== See also ==
- Kansas City-Southern Depot (Decatur, Arkansas)
- Kansas City Southern Railway Locomotive No. 73D and Caboose No. 385
- National Register of Historic Places listings in Polk County, Arkansas

Preceding station	Kansas City Southern Railway	Following station
Acorn toward Kansas City	Main Line	Rust toward Port Arthur
