= Bogg Springs Hotel =

- U.S. National Register of Historic Places
- Location within Arkansas Location within the United States
- Location: AR 84, Bogg Springs, Arkansas
- Coordinates: 34°19′45″N 94°25′40″W
- Area: less than one acre
- Built: 1904
- Architectural style: Plain Traditional
- NRHP reference No.: 93001023
- Added to NRHP: September 30, 1993

The Bogg Springs Hotel is a historic hotel in rural Polk County, Arkansas. Built in 1904–07, it is the only surviving element of a summer resort that thrived in the area in the 1920s. It now forms one of the buildings in the Bogg Springs Christian Camp site, owned by the American Baptist Association. It is located at the western end of Arkansas Highway 84, west of Wickes. The building is a two-story wood-frame structure, ten bays wide, with vernacular styling. A single-story porch extends across the west-facing front, and a kitchen ell projects to the rear.

The hotel building was listed on the National Register of Historic Places in 1993.

== See also ==
- National Register of Historic Places listings in Polk County, Arkansas
