= Sugar Creek Vista Overlook =

- U.S. National Register of Historic Places
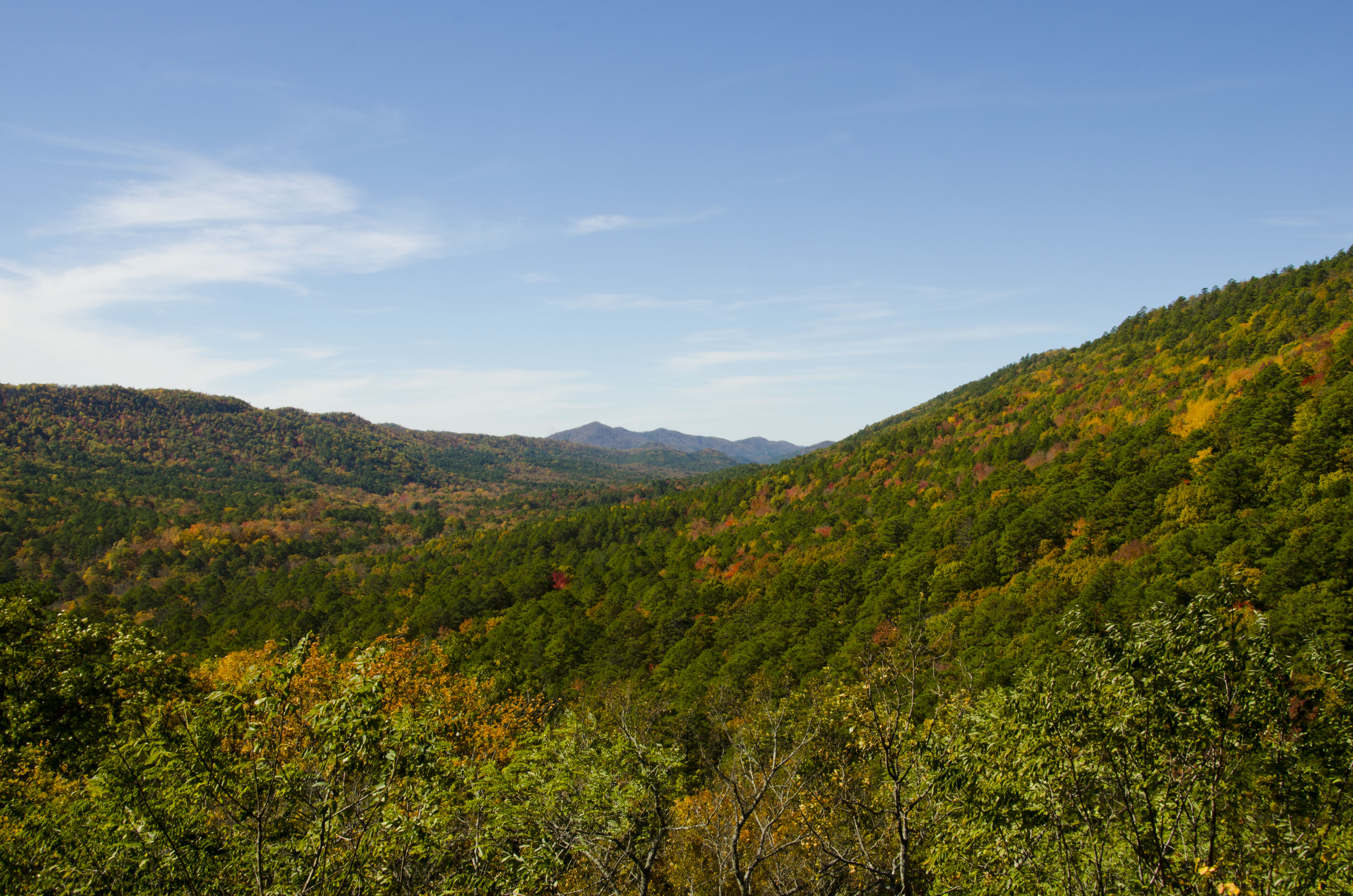
- View from the overlook

- Location within Arkansas Location within the United States
- Nearest city: Athens, Arkansas
- Coordinates: 34°25′43″N 94°3′21″W
- Area: less than one acre
- Built by: Civilian Conservation Corps
- MPS: Facilities Constructed by the CCC in Arkansas MPS
- NRHP reference No.: 07000205
- Added to NRHP: March 30, 2007

The Sugar Creek Vista Overlook is a historic scenic overlook in Ouachita National Forest. It is located on Polk County Road 64 (Forest Road 38), just south of Dicks Gap. The overlook is a simple roadside pullout on the west side of the road, with an angular retaining wall about 84 feet (26 m) long. The wall was built out of quarried novaculite stone set with grapevine mortar joints in 1935 by a crew of the Civilian Conservation Corps (CCC). It is one of only two CCC-built overlooks in the national forest, and the only one built with these particular materials.

The site was listed on the National Register of Historic Places in 2007.

== See also ==
- National Register of Historic Places listings in Polk County, Arkansas
