= Ebenezer Monument =

- U.S. National Register of Historic Places
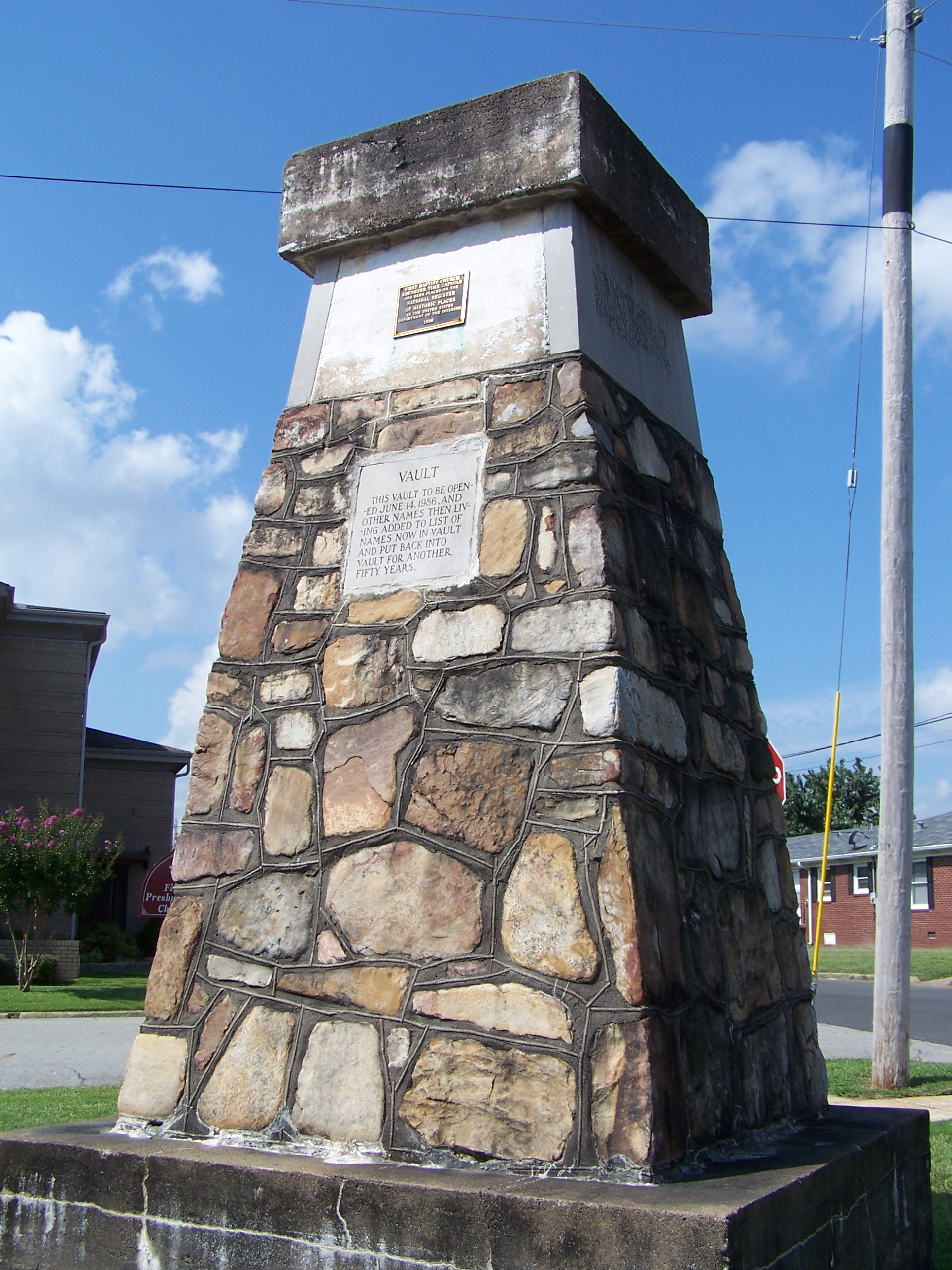

- Location within Arkansas Location within the United States
- Location: Jct. of 9th and Church Sts., Mena, Arkansas
- Coordinates: 34°35′4″N 94°14′30″W
- Area: less than one acre
- NRHP reference No.: 91000689
- Added to NRHP: January 30, 1992

A commemorative monument and marker placed at the corner of 9th and Church Streets, adjacent to the First Baptist Church in Mena, Arkansas. It is a tapered square structure of fieldstone and cement, about 12 feet (3.7 m) high and 5 feet (1.5 m) long on each side at the base. It has concrete panels on each side, three with engravings, and is topped by a pyramidal concrete cap. The monument was placed in 1935 as part of a campaign to galvanize local opposition to the controversial Commonwealth College, which was accused of teaching Communism and other evils. Local opposition contributed to the school's eventual closure in 1940. The monument's name is derived from a Bible verse inscribed on one of the panels: Ebenezer of First Baptist Church/"Hitherto Hath The Lord Helped Us" - I Samuel 7: 12/Sunday, June 14, 1936. The monument contains a time capsule, which is to be opened every 50 years. In 1986 the original time capsule was opened, and its contents replaced by new materials.

The monument was listed on the National Register of Historic Places in 1992.

== See also ==
- National Register of Historic Places listings in Polk County, Arkansas
