= Buckeye Vista Overlook =

- U.S. National Register of Historic Places
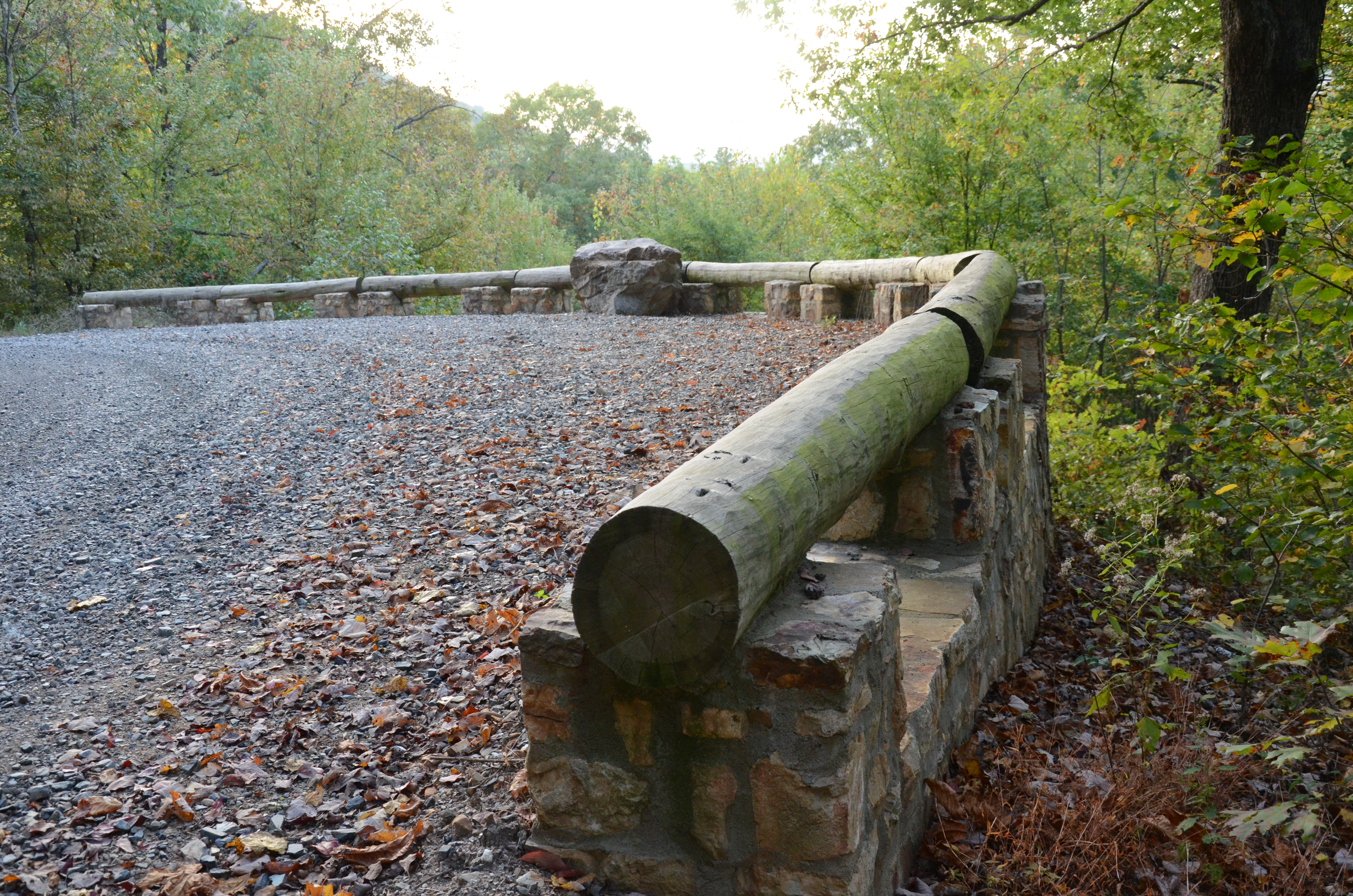

- Location within Arkansas Location within the United States
- Nearest city: Athens, Arkansas
- Coordinates: 34°24′47.3″N 94°2′2.1″W
- Area: less than one acre
- Built by: Civilian Conservation Corps
- MPS: Facilities Constructed by the CCC in Arkansas MPS
- NRHP reference No.: 07000204
- Added to NRHP: March 30, 2007

The Buckeye Vista Overlook is a historic scenic overlook in Ouachita National Forest. It is located on Ouachita National Forest Road 38 (also Polk County Road 64) on the north side of Buckeye Mountain. The overlook is a simple roadside pullout on the north side of the road, with a retaining wall about 70 feet (21 m) long. The wall was built out of quarried stone and mortar in 1935 by a crew of the Civilian Conservation Corps (CCC). It is one of only two CCC-built overlooks in the national forest.

The site was listed on the National Register of Historic Places in 2007.

== See also ==
- National Register of Historic Places listings in Polk County, Arkansas
