= Decatur station (Arkansas) =

- Kansas City-Southern Depot-Decatur
- U.S. National Register of Historic Places
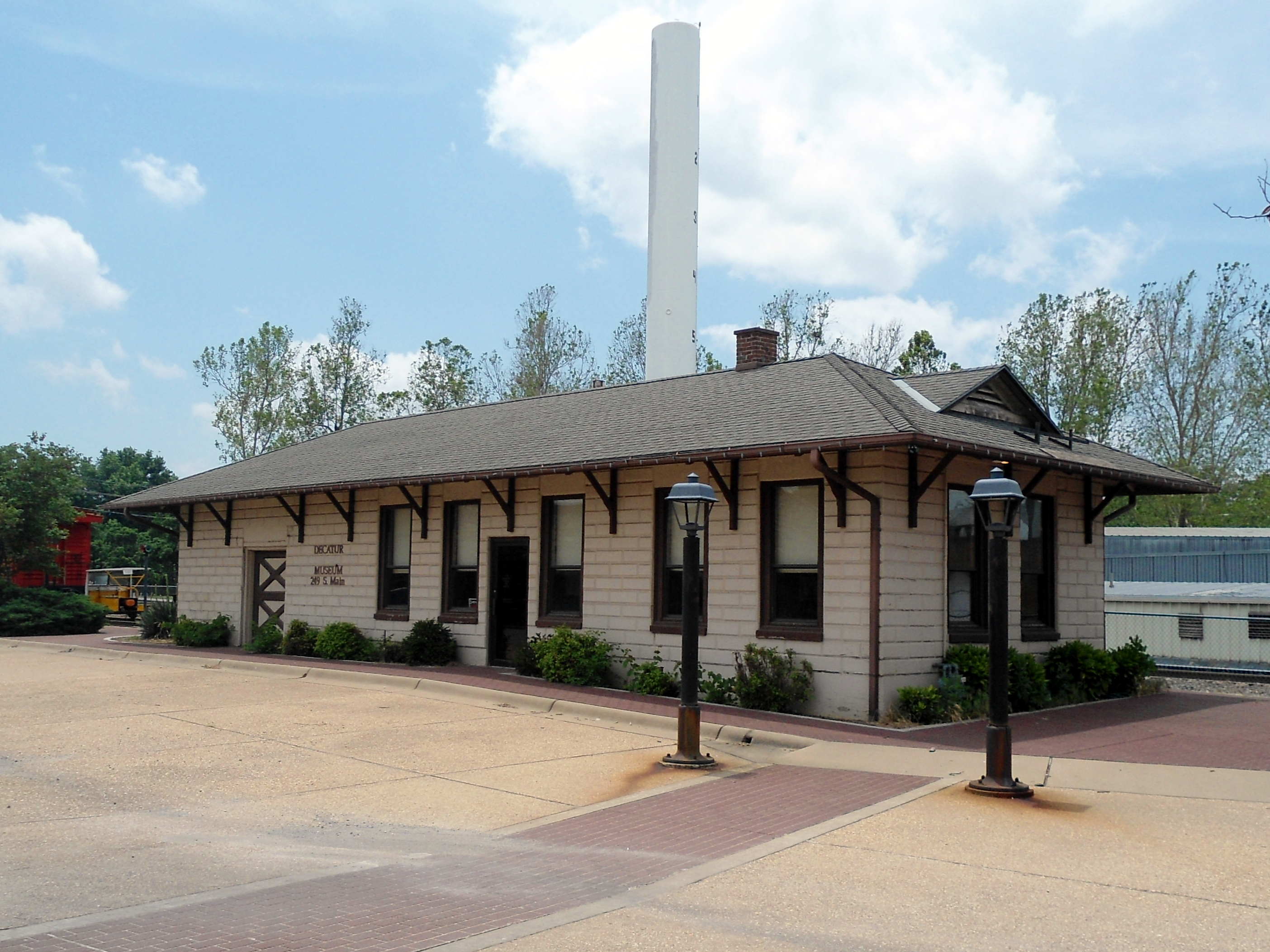

- Location within Arkansas Location within the United States
- Location: AR 59, Decatur, Arkansas
- Coordinates: 36°20′7″N 94°27′39″W
- Area: less than one acre
- Built: 1920
- Architect: Kansas City-Southern Railroad
- Architectural style: Bungalow/craftsman, Plain Traditional
- MPS: Historic Railroad Depots of Arkansas MPS
- NRHP reference No.: 92000606
- Added to NRHP: June 11, 1992

The Kansas City-Southern Depot is a historic railroad station at Arkansas Highway 59 and West North Street in Decatur, Arkansas. It is a long rectangular single-story structure, built out of concrete blocks. It has a hip roof with Craftsman-style brackets and two fisheye dormers, and a cross-gable projecting telegrapher's bay decorated with fish-scale wood shingles. It was built c. 1920 by the Kansas City Southern Railway.

The depot was listed on the National Register of Historic Places in 1992.

== See also ==
- Kansas City Southern Railway Locomotive No. 73D and Caboose No. 385
- Kansas City Southern Depot (Mena, Arkansas)
- National Register of Historic Places listings in Benton County, Arkansas

Preceding station	Kansas City Southern Railway	Following station
Gravette toward Kansas City	Main Line	Gentry toward Port Arthur
