= Villisca National Guard Armory =

- U.S. National Register of Historic Places

- Location within Iowa Location within the United States
- Location: 316 E. 3rd St. Villisca, Iowa
- Coordinates: 40°55′47.3″N 94°58′34.7″W
- Built: 1912–1913
- NRHP reference No.: 15000227
- Added to NRHP: May 18, 2015

The Villisca National Guard Armory is a historic building located in Villisca, Iowa, United States. It was built for use as a National Guard Armory between 1912 and 1913, and was also later used to host community events. In 2015, it was listed on the National Register of Historic Places.

== History ==
Villisca had active military units as far back as 1877. Local citizens raised the funds to build the armory, which was completed in 1913. Company F participated in the Mexican Expedition, World War I, World War II, the Korean War, the Vietnam War, and the Gulf War. The building was used for a variety of community events in addition to activities for the Iowa National Guard. It was used as the gymnasium for the local high school until 1959. Ownership of the building was transferred from the Villisca Armory Corporation to the State of Iowa in 1973, and in 2000 it was transferred to the Villisca Community School District. During the 2000–2001 school year it was used for classroom space when the present high school building was under construction. Subsequently, the building has been used for storage and various athletic functions. It was listed on the National Register of Historic Places in 2015.
