= Studebaker Showroom =

- U.S. National Register of Historic Places
- U.S. Historic district – Contributing property
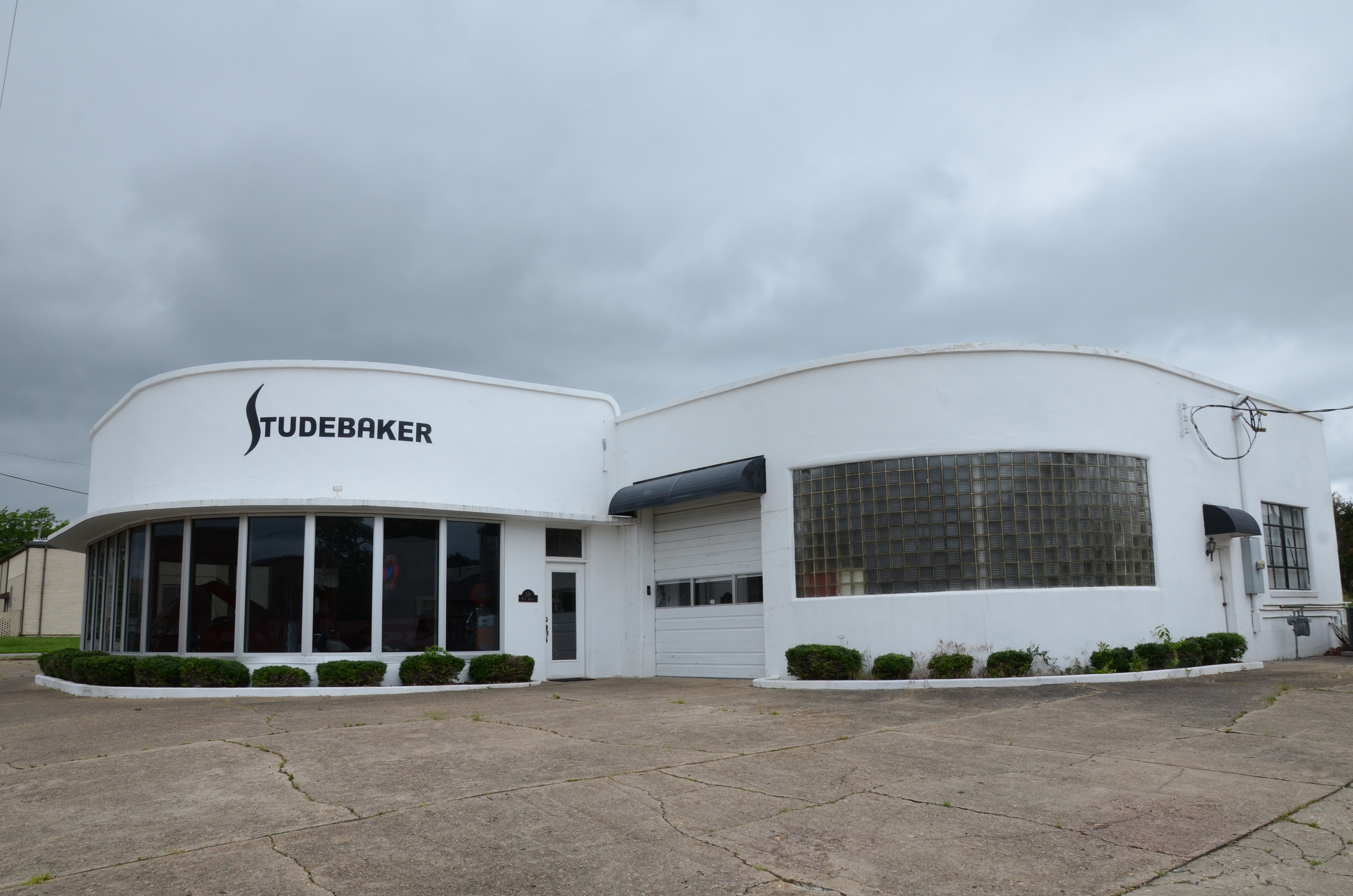

- Location within Arkansas Location within the United States
- Location: 519 Port Arthur, Mena, Arkansas
- Coordinates: 34°35′2″N 94°14′12″W
- Area: less than one acre
- Built: 1948
- Architectural style: Moderne
- Part of: Mena Commercial Historic District (ID09000321)
- MPS: Arkansas Highway History and Architecture MPS
- NRHP reference No.: 00000636

Significant dates
- Added to NRHP: June 9, 2000
- Designated CP: July 23, 2009

The Studebaker Showroom is a historic commercial building at 519 Port Arthur Avenue (corner of De Queen) in downtown Mena, Arkansas. It is a single-story stuccoed concrete block structure with a flat roof. Built in 1948, it is a distinctive local example of the Moderne style, with rounded corners on the corners of the front part of the building. This includes a projecting showroom section and the corners of the main service and sales area behind, which are decorated with banks of glass blocks, another Moderne hallmark.

The building was listed on the National Register of Historic Places in 2000.

== See also ==
- National Register of Historic Places listings in Polk County, Arkansas
