= St. Agnes Catholic Church (Mena, Arkansas) =

Historic church in Mena, Arkansas, United States

- U.S. National Register of Historic Places
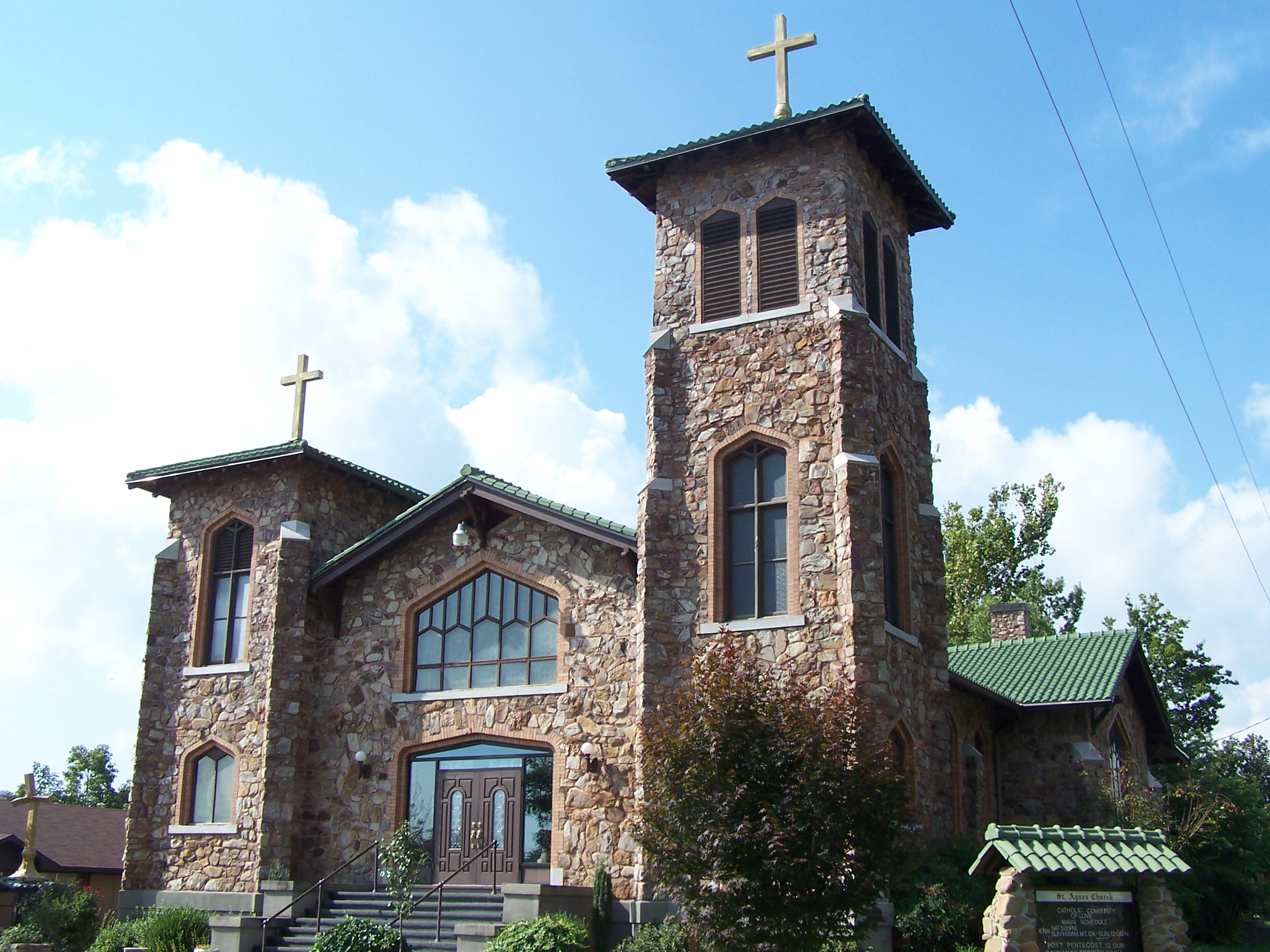

- Location within Arkansas Location within the United States
- Location: Jct. of 8th and Walnut Sts., Mena, Arkansas
- Coordinates: 34°35′11″N 94°14′33″W
- Area: less than one acre
- Architect: Rev. A.P. Gallagher
- Architectural style: Mission/Spanish Revival, Spanish Mission
- NRHP reference No.: 91000696
- Added to NRHP: June 5, 1991

St. Agnes Catholic Church is a Roman Catholic church at 203 Eighth Street in Mena, Arkansas. The parish, established not long after Mena's founding in 1896, meets in a stone Spanish Mission Revival built in 1921–22 to a design by Rev. A. P. Gallagher, who oversaw the parish for more than 50 years. It is one of Polk County's most significant architectural statements, merging the common use of local fieldstone with more sophistical Mission style elements. The church was listed on the National Register of Historic Places in 1991.

== See also ==
- National Register of Historic Places listings in Polk County, Arkansas
