= Kansas City Southern Railway Locomotive No. 73D and Caboose No. 385 =

- Kansas City Southern Railway Locomotive #73D and Caboose #385
- U.S. National Register of Historic Places
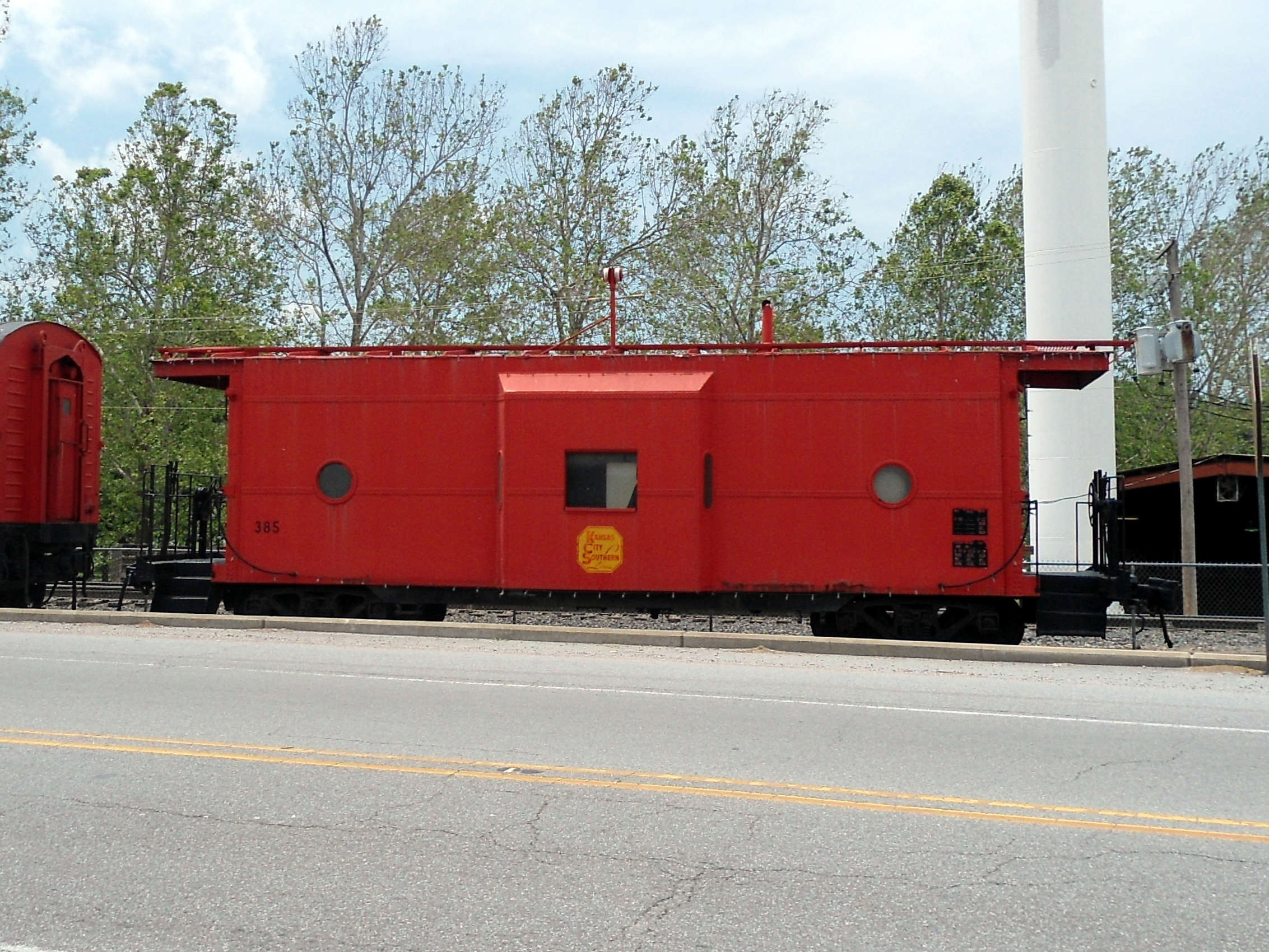
- The caboose

- Location within Arkansas Location within the United States
- Location: AR 59 S of Church Ave., Decatur, Arkansas
- Coordinates: 36°20′13″N 94°27′40″W
- Area: Less than 1 acre (0.40 ha)
- Built: 1950
- Architect: Electro-Motive Division of GM; Kansas City Southern Railway
- NRHP reference No.: 06000072
- Added to NRHP: February 21, 2006

The Kansas City Southern Railway Locomotive No. 73D and Caboose No. 385 are historic railroad equipment located near Arkansas Highway 59 and Church Street in Decatur, Arkansas. The locomotive is an EMD F7A built in 1950, and used in service by the Kansas City Southern Railway until 1991, although it was converted to a slug unit sometime in the 1970s and the body was filled with concrete and old wheels. The caboose was built in 1952 by the Louisiana and Arkansas Railroad, a division of Kansas City Southern, and used in service until 1991. Both were purchased in 1991 by Peterson Farms, restored, and placed on display near the former Kansas City Southern depot in Decatur.

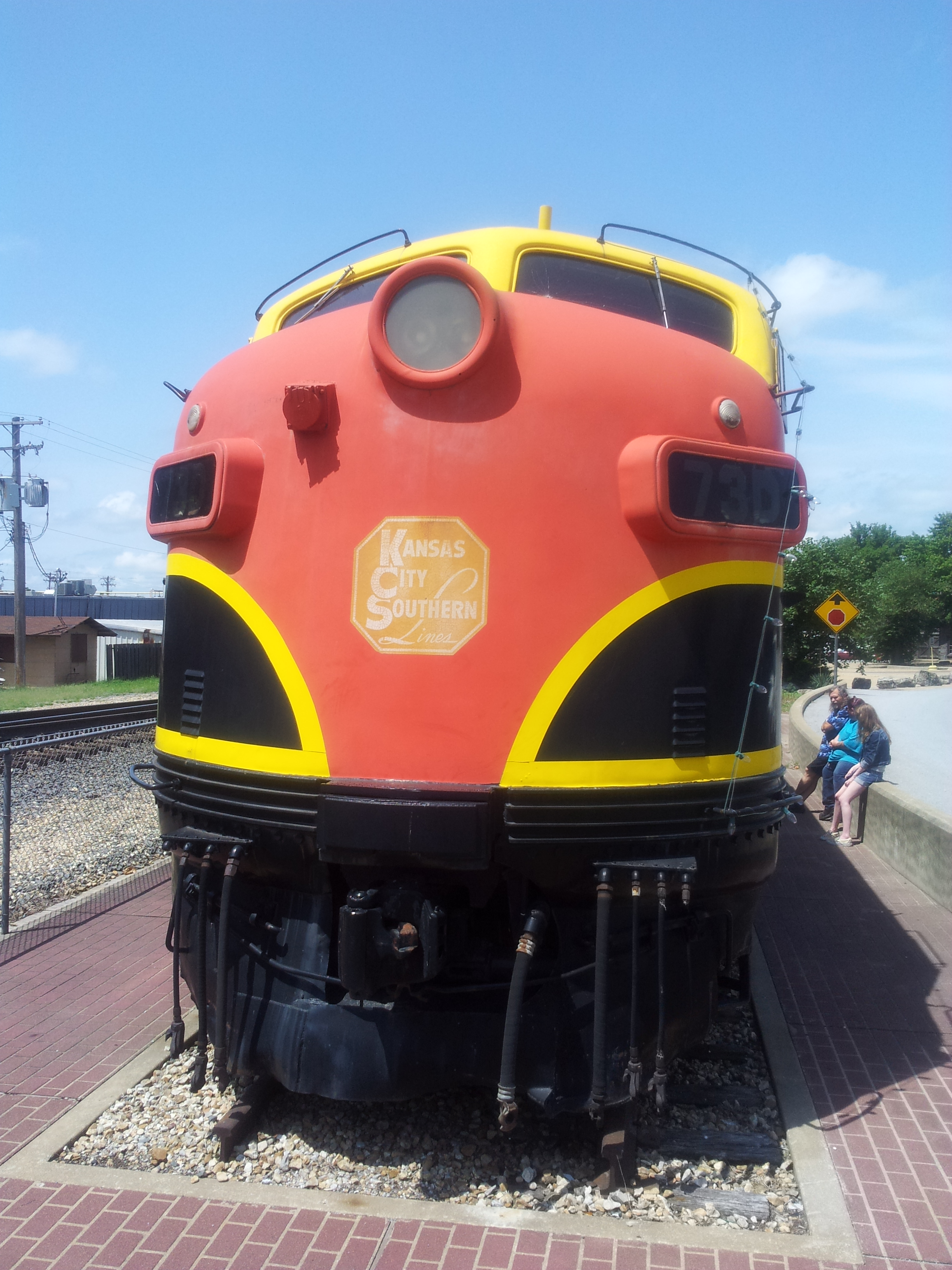
Kansas City Southern #73D, currently on display at the depot on Arkansas highway 59 in Decatur, AR.

The locomotive and caboose were listed on the National Register of Historic Places in 2006.

== See also ==
- National Register of Historic Places listings in Benton County, Arkansas
- Kansas City Southern Railway Caboose No. 383
