= Mena City Hall =

- Old Post Office
- U.S. National Register of Historic Places
- U.S. Historic district – Contributing property
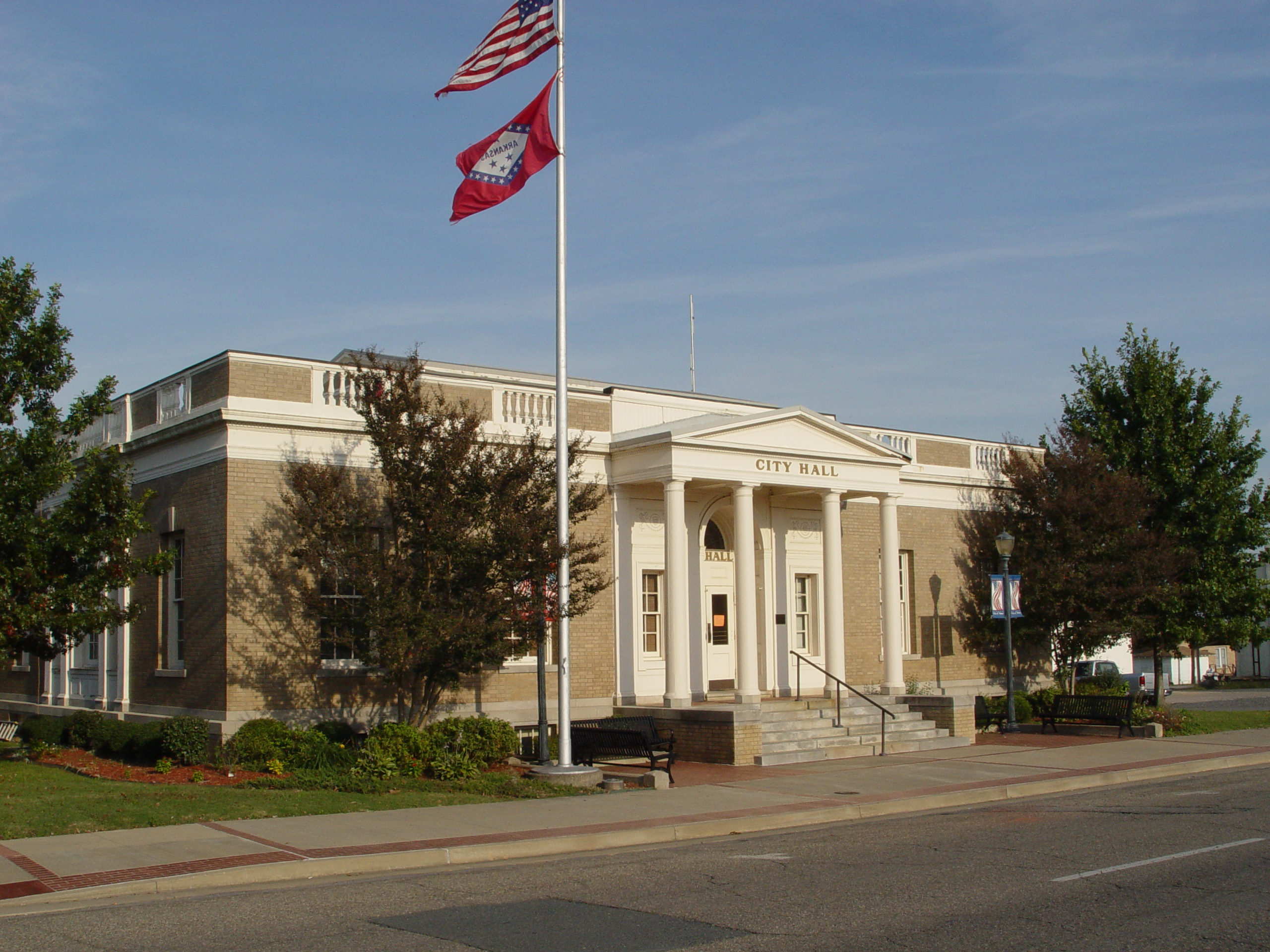

- Location within Arkansas Location within the United States
- Location: 520 N. Mena St., Mena, Arkansas
- Coordinates: 34°35′3″N 94°14′17″W
- Area: less than one acre
- Built: 1917
- Architect: Office of the Supervising Architect under James Wetmore
- Architectural style: Colonial Revival, Classical Revival
- Part of: Mena Commercial Historic District (ID09000321)
- NRHP reference No.: 91000686

Significant dates
- Added to NRHP: June 5, 1991
- Designated CP: July 23, 2009

Mena City Hall, also known as the Old Post Office, is the city hall of Mena, Arkansas, located at 520 North Mena Street. It is a two-story brick building with Classical Revival and Colonial Revival features, designed by Treasury architect James Wetmore and built in 1917. Its elaborate lobby decorations are still visible despite the building's conversion for use as city hall. Its exterior features a Classical pedimented portico, and an entrance topped by a Colonial Revival fanlight.

The building was listed on the National Register of Historic Places in 1991.

== See also ==
- National Register of Historic Places listings in Polk County, Arkansas
- List of United States post offices
