= Shady Lake Recreation Area =

- Shady Lake Bathhouse
- U.S. National Register of Historic Places
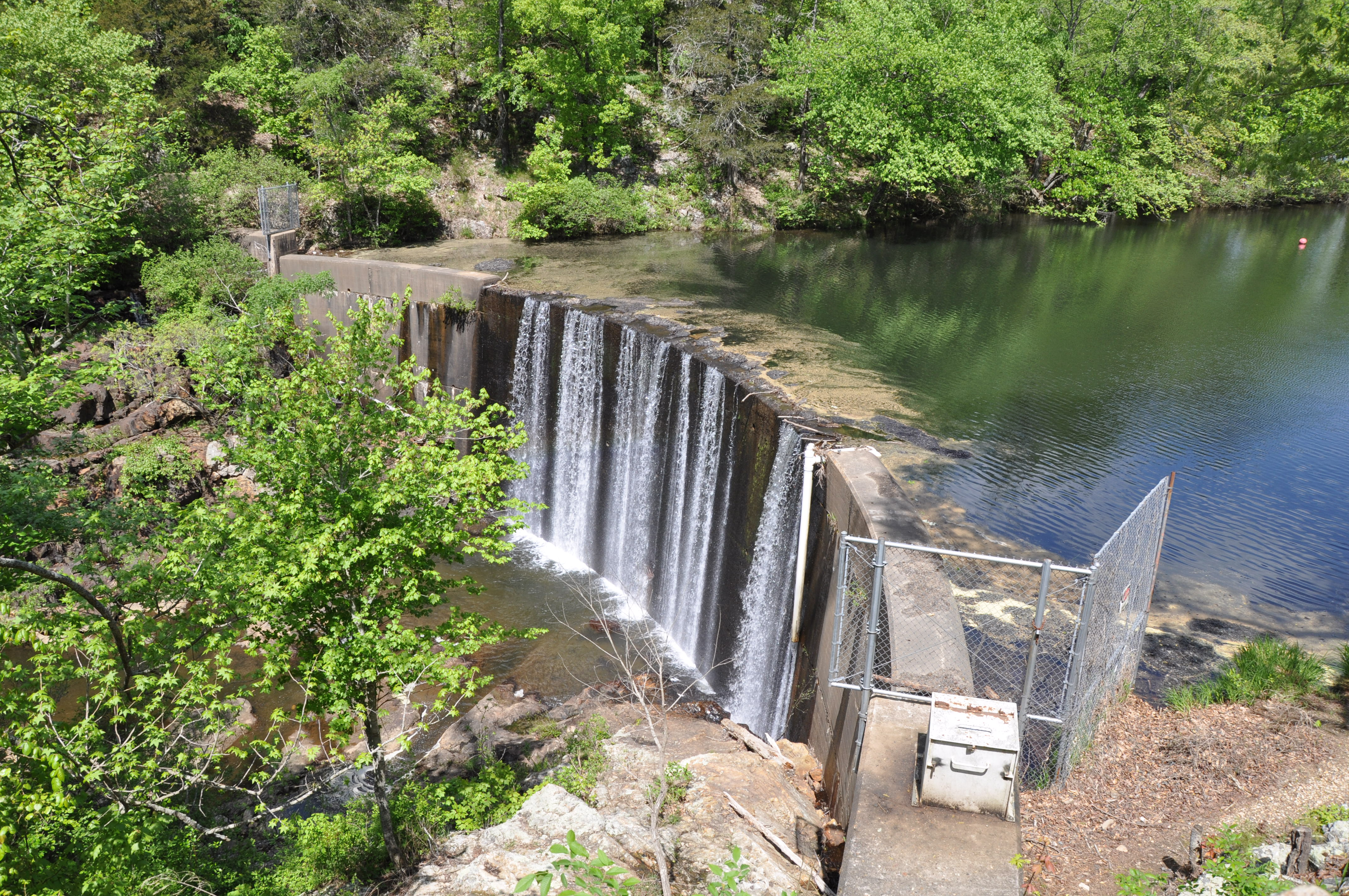
- Shady Lake Dam

- Location within Arkansas Location within the United States
- Nearest city: Athens, Arkansas
- Coordinates: 34°21′41″N 94°1′51″W
- Area: less than one acre
- Built: 1940
- Built by: Civilian Conservation Corps
- Architectural style: Rustic
- MPS: Facilities Constructed by the CCC in Arkansas MPS
- NRHP reference No.: 93001097
- Added to NRHP: October 20, 1993

Shady Lake Recreation Area is a campground and public recreation area in southwestern Ouachita National Forest, southeast of Mena, Arkansas and west of Glenwood, Arkansas. The area is oriented around Shady Lake, a body of water on the South Fork Saline River impounded by a dam built c. 1940 by the Civilian Conservation Corps (CCC). The area is administered by the United States Forest Service (USFS).

== Description ==
Shady Lake is located in central western Arkansas, on the southern fringe of Ouachita National Forest, about 30 miles (48 km) west of Glenwood. The lake itself is roughly crescent-shaped and was created in 1935 with the assistance of enrollees from the CCC, particularly by members from Company 742 stationed at Camp F-4 (situated within the community of Shady). The dam measures 130 feet (40 m) long and 40 feet (12 m) high across the Saline River. The dam, along with seven other CCC-built structures, is listed on the National Register of Historic Places.

The developed facilities are located on the north side of the lake, and include four camping loops, an swimming area, fishing pier, amphitheater, and other recreational facilities. Comfort facilities consist of 50 camping units including 19 units with water and electricity and one with full hookups, bathroom facilities with warm-water showers, and flush toilets. A central feature of the beach area is its CCC-built bathhouse, a rustic log structure with novelty siding, which includes changing areas at the ends and an open picnic area in the middle. A second CCC-built picnic shelter is located north of the dock.

Other CCC-built structures in the recreation area include the diving platform, amphitheater, caretaker's house, and two stone bridges. The first bridge crosses the South Fork on the forest road east of the lake, and is a stone arch structure built over a metal culvert. The second bridge carries part of the campground loop road across East Fork, just north of the lake.

== See also ==
- National Register of Historic Places listings in Polk County, Arkansas
