= Mena Commercial Historic District =

Historic district in Arkansas, United States

- U.S. National Register of Historic Places
- U.S. Historic district
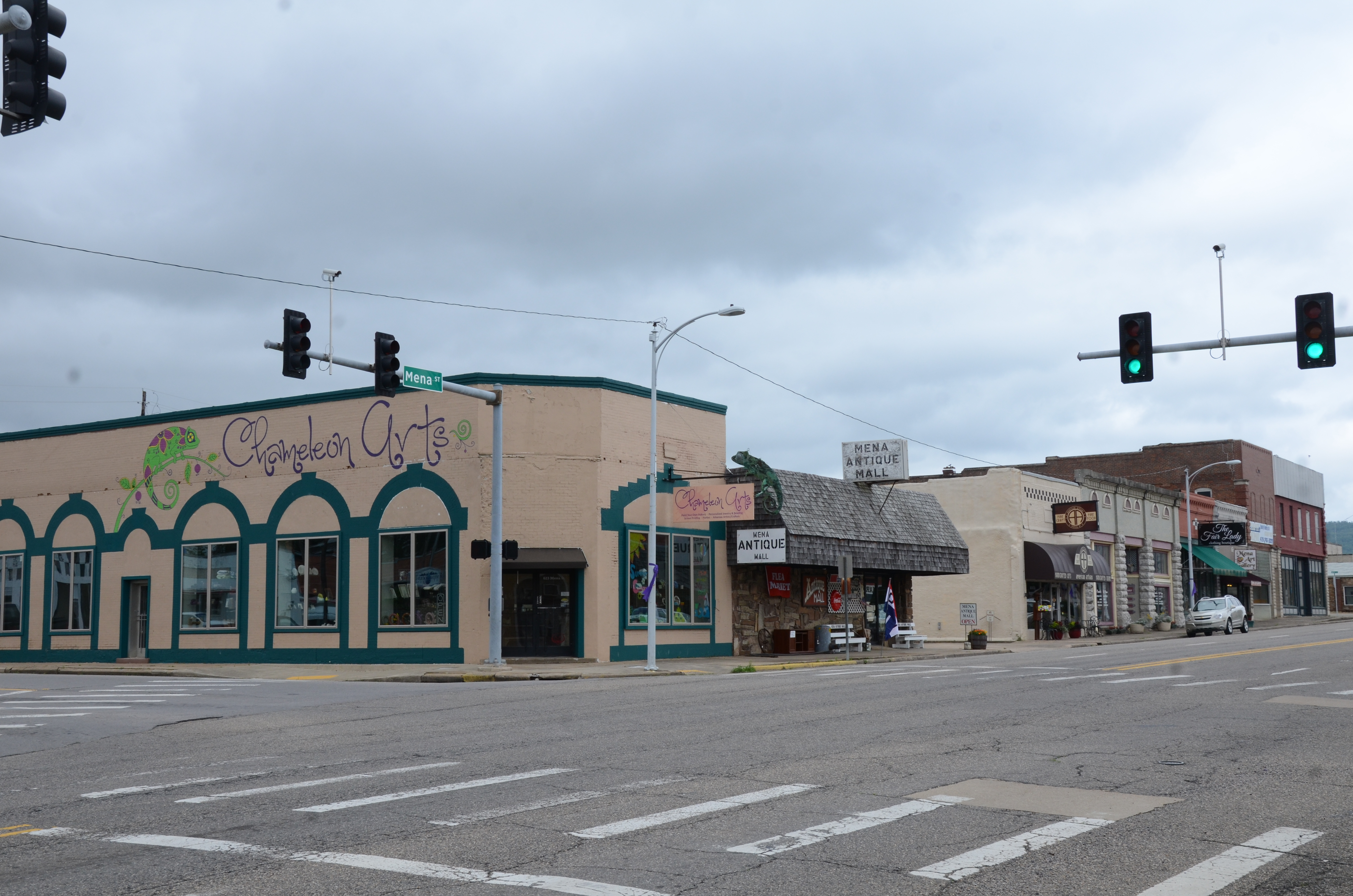

- Location within Arkansas Location within the United States
- Location: Mena St. between Port Arthur and Gillham Ave., Sherwood Ave. between Mena and DeQueen St., and US 71 S. between Mena, Mena, Arkansas
- Area: 39 acres (16 ha)
- Built: 1896
- Architectural style: Early Commercial, Late 19th And 20th Century Revivals
- NRHP reference No.: 09000321
- Added to NRHP: July 23, 2009

The Mena Commercial Historic District encompasses the historic downtown area of Mena, Arkansas, the county seat of Polk County in western Arkansas. The district extends along Mena Street between Port Arthur and Gillham Avenues, extending a short way to the south on Sherwood Avenue, opposite the railroad tracks for which the town's existence is responsible. Mena was founded as a major railroad service town for the Kansas City, Pittsburg and Gulf Railroad, as its site was located midway between Port Arthur, Texas and Kansas City, Missouri. The railroad located a major service yard here, and the town grew up around it. Most of its commercial center was developed between 1896 and 1940, with a variety of one and two-story commercial brick buildings in typical early 20th-century styles. The district, listed on the National Register of Historic Places in 2009, includes four properties previously listed separately: the railroad station, Mena City Hall (a repurposed 1917 post office building), the former Elks Lodge, and the former Studebaker Showroom.

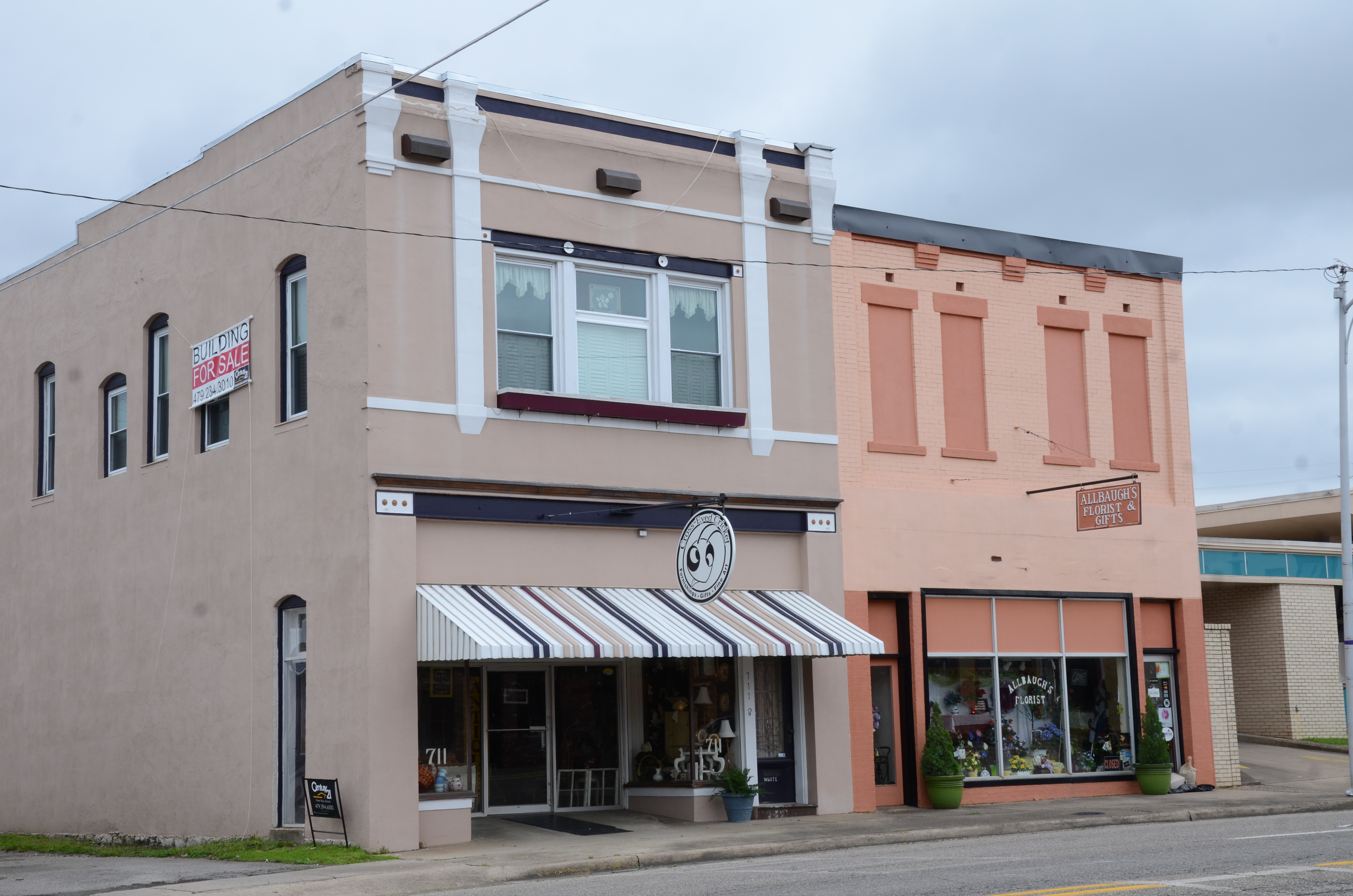
Historic buildings in Mena

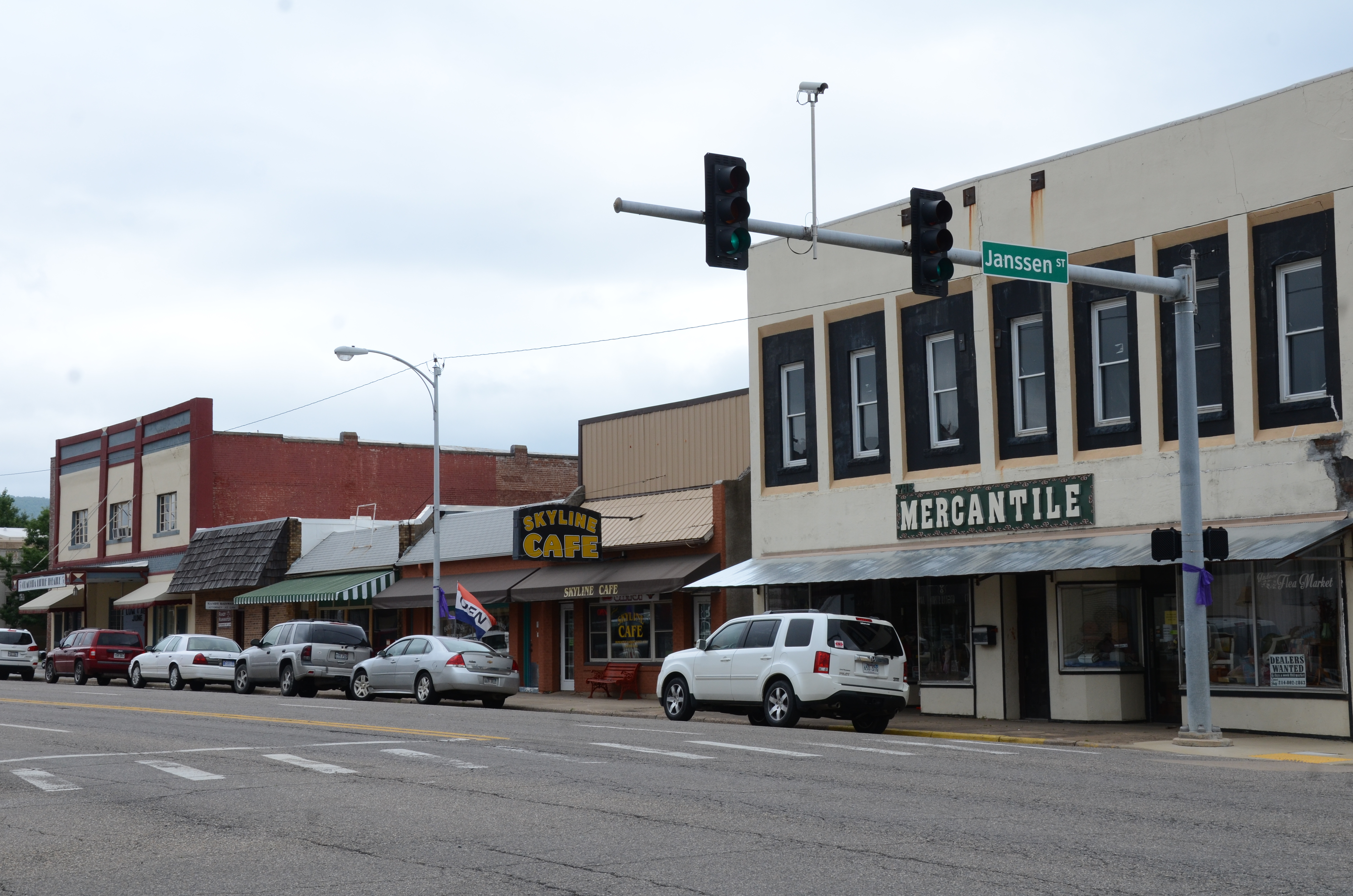
Historic buildings in Mena

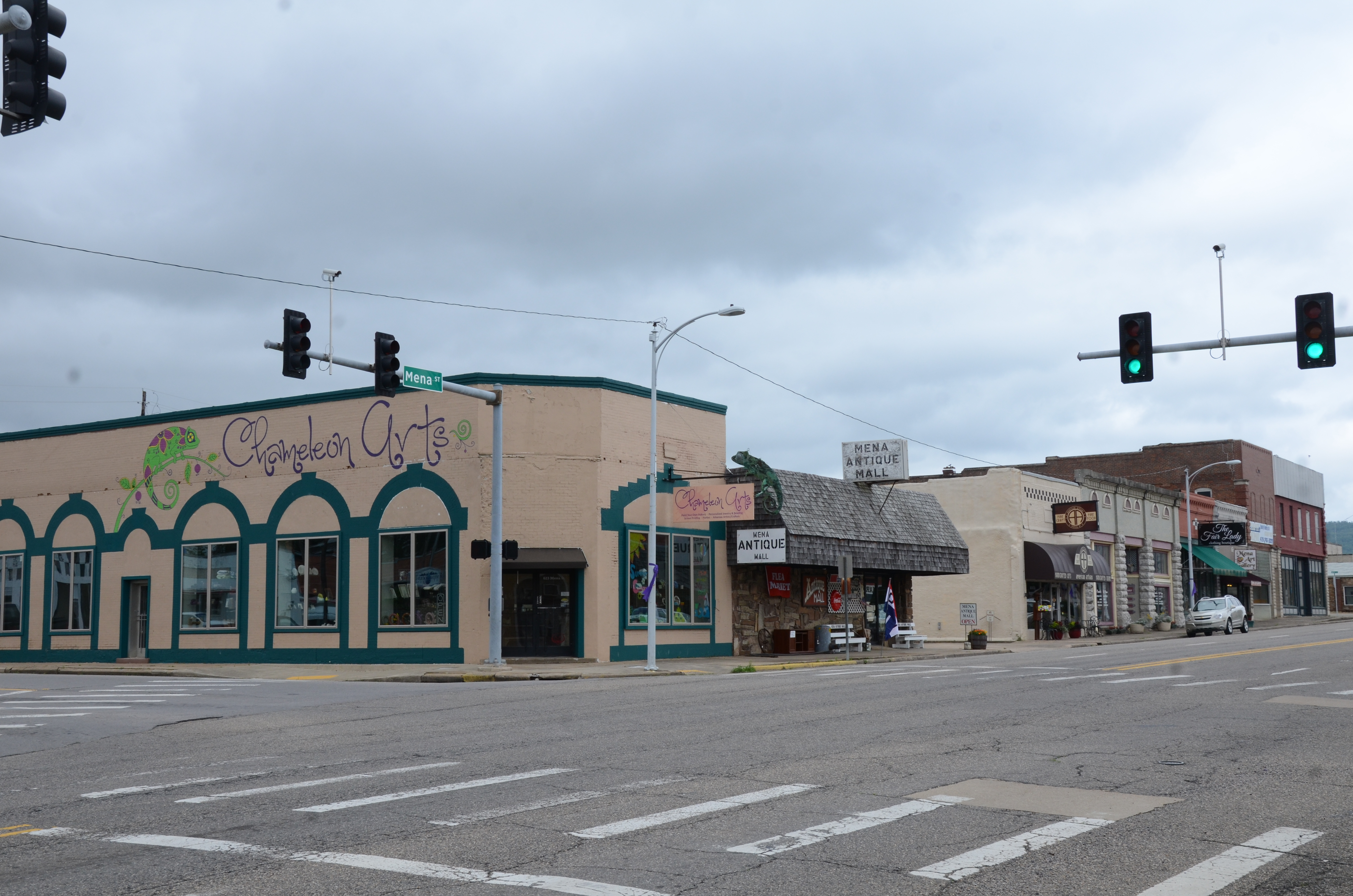
Historic buildings in Mena

== See also ==
- National Register of Historic Places listings in Polk County, Arkansas
