= Elks Lodge (Mena, Arkansas) =

- U.S. National Register of Historic Places
- U.S. Historic district – Contributing property
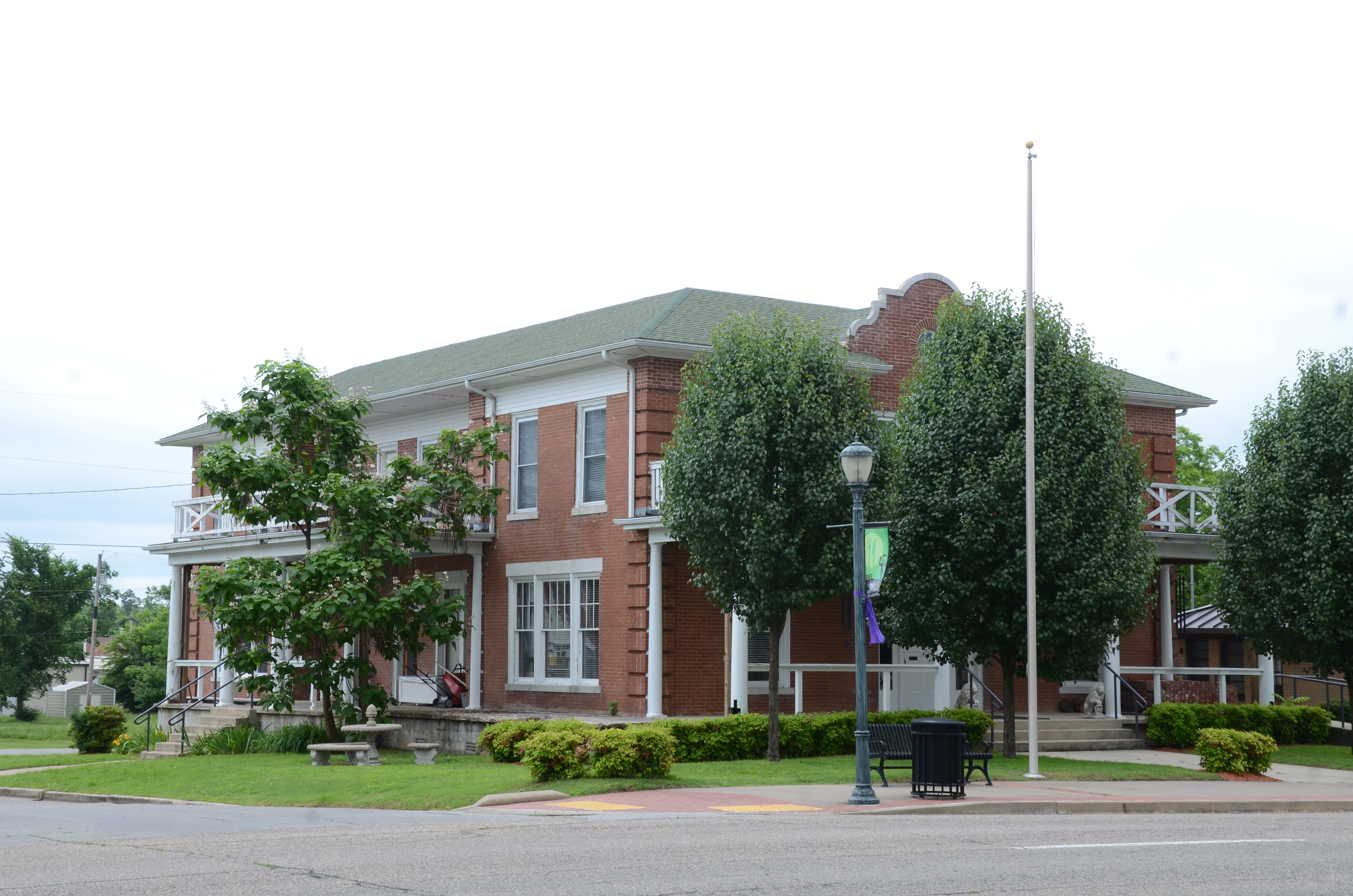

- Location within Arkansas Location within the United States
- Location: 500 Mena St., Mena, Arkansas
- Coordinates: 34°35′9″N 94°14′16″W
- Area: less than one acre
- Built: 1908
- Architectural style: Mission/Spanish Revival, Classical Revival
- Part of: Mena Commercial Historic District (ID09000321)
- NRHP reference No.: 98000616

Significant dates
- Added to NRHP: June 4, 1998
- Designated CP: July 23, 2009

The Elks Lodge is a historic clubhouse at 500 Mena Street in Mena, Arkansas. It is a two-story brick building, with a hip roof, marble trim, and a granite foundation. Its Colonial Revival styling includes corner quoining, porches along the front and side with square supporting posts, and a diamond-pattern balcony balustrade above. It was built in 1908 by the local chapter of the Elks fraternal organization and has long been a local social venue. Between 1935 and 1951 it housed the local hospital, after which it returned to the Elks. It is also one of the community's finest examples of commercial Colonial Revival architecture.

The building was listed on the National Register of Historic Places in 1998.

== See also ==
- National Register of Historic Places listings in Polk County, Arkansas
