= Bard Springs Dam No. 1 =

- U.S. National Register of Historic Places
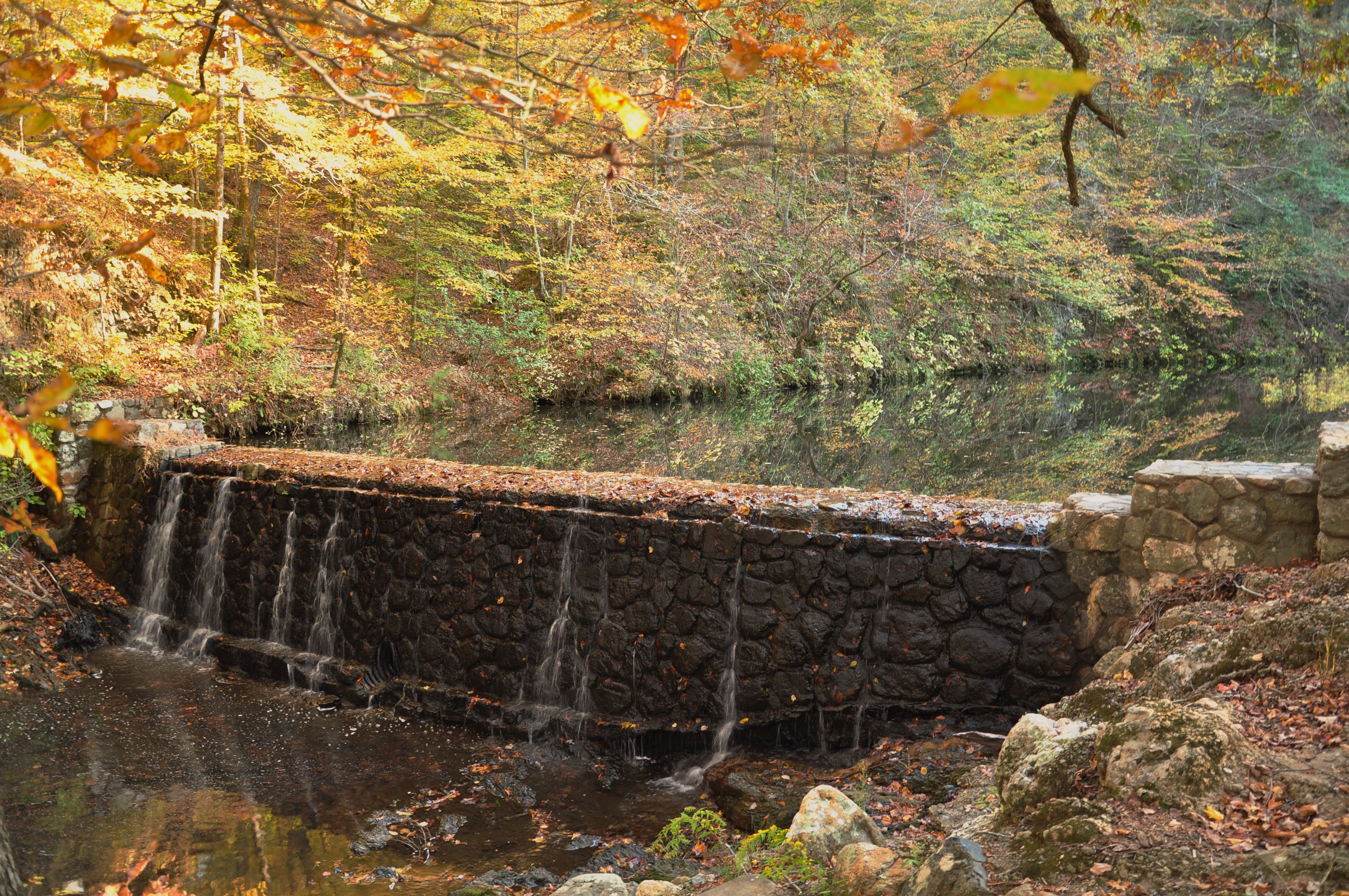

- Location within Arkansas Location within the United States
- Nearest city: Athens, Arkansas
- Coordinates: 34°23′27″N 94°0′41″W
- Area: less than one acre
- Built: 1936
- Built by: Civilian Conservation Corps
- Architectural style: Rustic
- MPS: Facilities Constructed by the CCC in Arkansas MPS
- NRHP reference No.: 93001074
- Added to NRHP: October 21, 1993

The Bard Springs Dam No. 1 is a historic recreational support facility in Ouachita National Forest. It is located at the Bard Springs recreation site, southeast of Mena and north of Athens in Polk County, off County Road 82 and Forest Road 106 on the banks of Blaylock Creek. This dam is located at the western end of the recreation area, and is about 65 feet (20 m) long and 8 feet (2.4 m) high at its center. It is made of fieldstone, and has a series of chutes and steps across its top. It was built in 1936 by a crew of the Civilian Conservation Corps, and is one of four surviving CCC structures (the others are a second dam, bathhouse, and a picnic shelter) in the immediate area.

The dam was listed on the National Register of Historic Places in 1993.

== See also ==
- Bard Springs Dam No. 2
- National Register of Historic Places listings in Polk County, Arkansas
