= Kansas City Southern Railway Caboose No. 383 =

- U.S. National Register of Historic Places
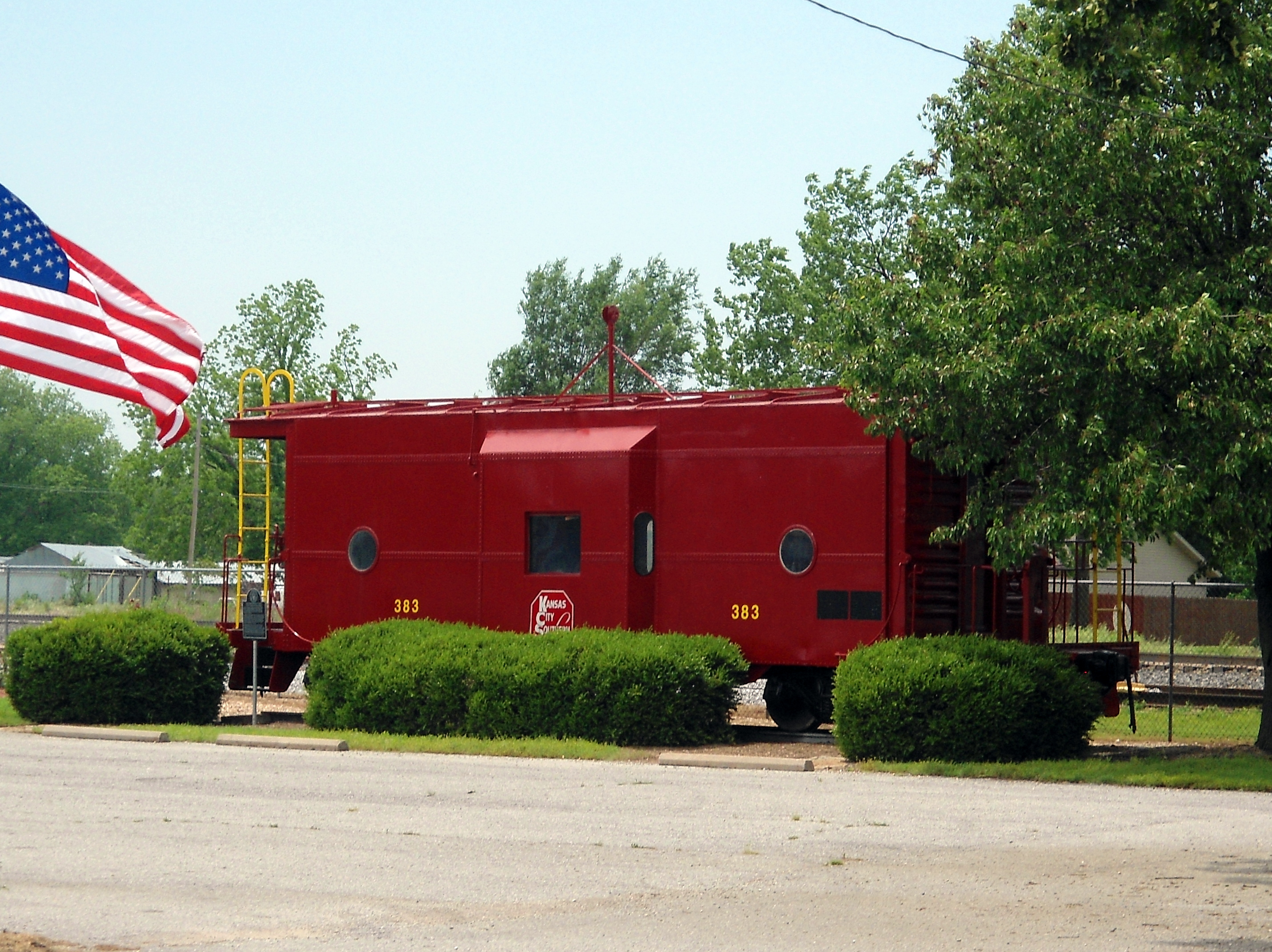
- The caboose

- Location within Arkansas Location within the United States
- Location: Northwest of the Arkansas Highway 72 and Arkansas Highway 59 intersection, Gravette, Arkansas
- Coordinates: 36°25′17″N 94°27′12″W
- Built: 1952
- Architect: Kansas City Southern Railway
- NRHP reference No.: 10000782
- Added to NRHP: September 23, 2010

The Kansas City Southern Railway Caboose No. 383 is a historic railroad caboose in Centennial Park near Arkansas Highways 59 and 72 in Gravette, Arkansas. It was built in 1952 by the Louisiana and Arkansas Railroad, a division of the Kansas City Southern Railway, and served the latter until 1990. It was given to the city of Gravette in 1991, which had the vehicle restored and placed in the park. The caboose illustrates advances in caboose design, because it was built with bay windows rather than a cupola for observing the train, a change necessitated by increasing large loads being carried.

The caboose was listed on the National Register of Historic Places in 2010.

== See also ==
- National Register of Historic Places listings in Benton County, Arkansas
- Kansas City Southern Railway Caboose No. 385
