= Decatur, Arkansas =

- City
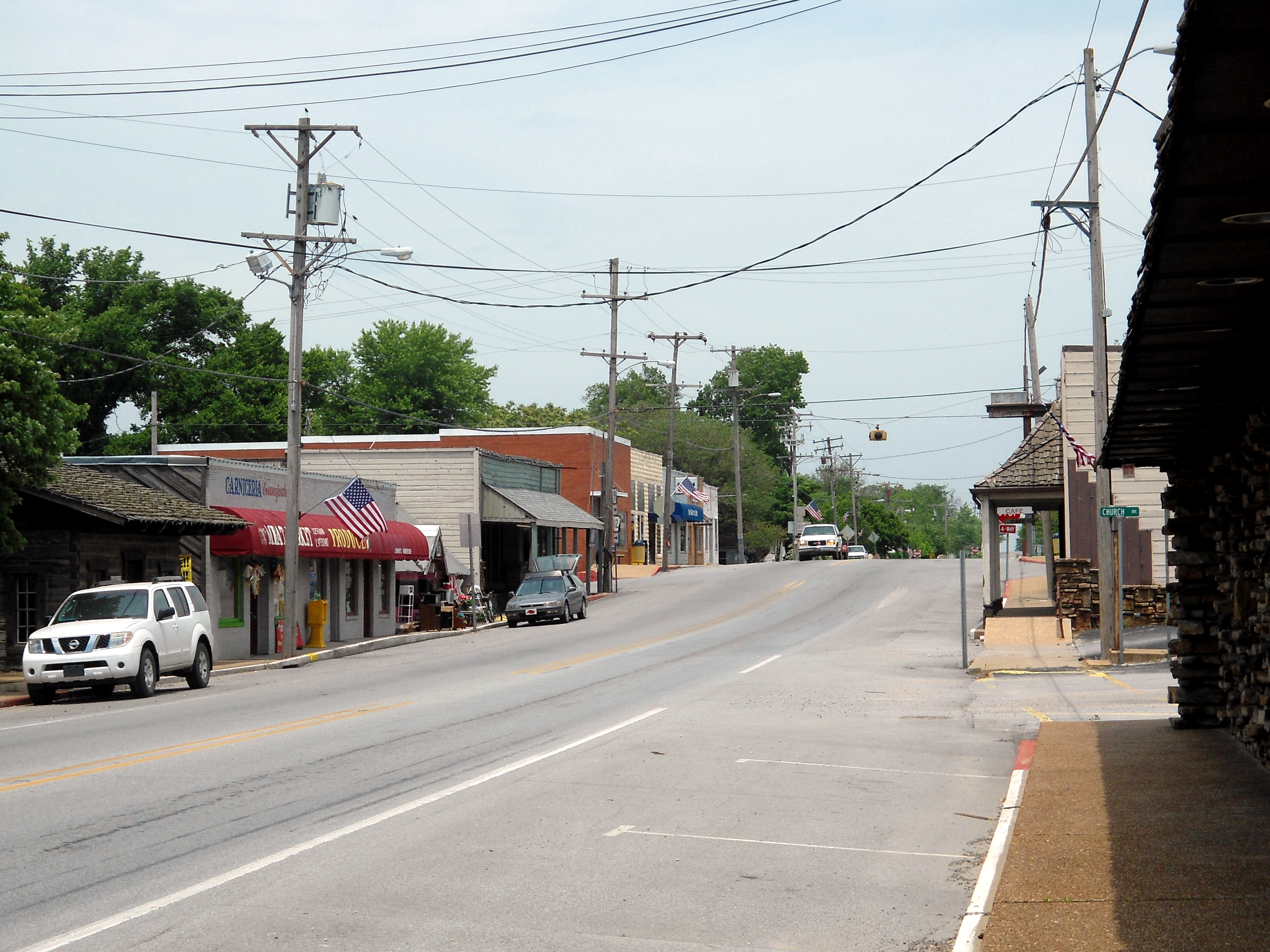
- Downtown Decatur

- Logo

- Location of Decatur in Benton County, Arkansas
- Coordinates: 36°20′25″N 94°27′28″W
- Country: United States
- State: Arkansas
- County: Benton

Area
  - Total: 4.53 sq mi (11.72 km^{2})
  - Land: 4.47 sq mi (11.58 km^{2})
  - Water: 0.054 sq mi (0.14 km^{2})
- Elevation: 1,204 ft (367 m)

Population (2020)
  - Total: 1,773
  - Estimate (2025): 1,893 ▲
  - Density: 396.6/sq mi (153.11/km^{2})
- Time zone: UTC-6 (Central (CST))
  - Summer (DST): UTC-5 (CDT)
- ZIP code: 72722
- Area code: 479
- FIPS code: 05-17740
- GNIS feature ID: 2404207
- Website: decaturarkansas.com

Decatur is a city, in Benton County, Arkansas, United States. The population was 1,773 at the 2020 census. It is part of the Northwest Arkansas region. This town is named after Commodore Stephen Decatur, Jr.

== Geography ==
Decatur is located in western Benton County at 36°20′15″N 94°27′24″W (36.337541, -94.456721). Arkansas Highway 59 passes through the city, leading north 6 miles (10 km) to Gravette and 13 miles (21 km) to the Missouri border, and south 13 miles (21 km) to Siloam Springs. Arkansas Highway 102 leads east 16 miles (26 km) to Bentonville and west 10 miles (16 km) to the Oklahoma border.

According to the United States Census Bureau, Decatur has a total area of 4.5 square miles (11.7 km^{2}), of which 4.4 square miles (11.5 km^{2}) is land and 0.039 square miles (0.1 km^{2}), or 1.21%, is water.

== Natural disaster ==
On May 26, 2024, a tornado that was reportedly the widest in the history of the state of Arkansas, at 1.82 miles wide, ravaged the west side of the community.

== Buildings ==
The Blessed Stanley Rother Mission Church is the first Catholic church in the world dedicated to Blessed Stanley Rother.

== Demographics ==
Historical population
Census	Pop.	Note	%±
1910	246		—
1920	424		72.4%
1930	413		−2.6%
1940	358		−13.3%
1950	350		−2.2%
1960	415		18.6%
1970	847		104.1%
1980	1,013		19.6%
1990	918		−9.4%
2000	1,314		43.1%
2010	1,699		29.3%
2020	1,773		4.4%
2025 (est.)	1,893	▲	6.8%
U.S. Decennial Census; 2015 Estimate

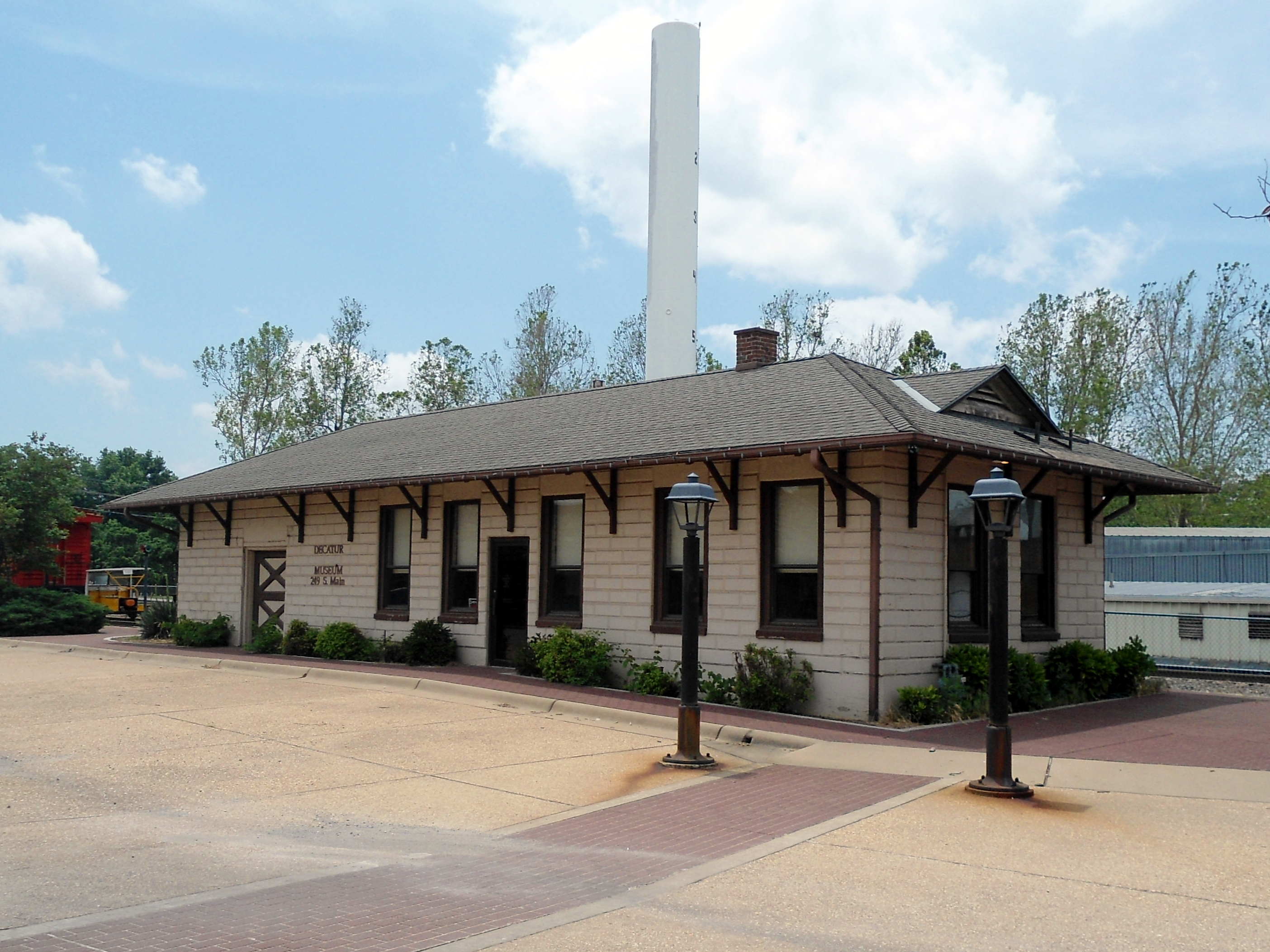
The historic Kansas City-Southern Depot was built in 1920 and added to the National Register of Historic Places (NRHP) in 1992.

=== 2020 census ===
As of the 2020 census, Decatur had a population of 1,773. The median age was 30.2 years. 31.1% of residents were under the age of 18 and 9.5% of residents were 65 years of age or older. For every 100 females there were 102.6 males, and for every 100 females age 18 and over there were 101.7 males age 18 and over. There were 419 families residing in the city.

0.0% of residents lived in urban areas, while 100.0% lived in rural areas.

There were 614 households in Decatur, of which 41.5% had children under the age of 18 living in them. Of all households, 42.8% were married-couple households, 20.5% were households with a male householder and no spouse or partner present, and 26.7% were households with a female householder and no spouse or partner present. About 25.7% of all households were made up of individuals and 7.5% had someone living alone who was 65 years of age or older.

There were 685 housing units, of which 10.4% were vacant. The homeowner vacancy rate was 2.6% and the rental vacancy rate was 6.1%.

Decatur racial composition
Race	Number	Percentage
White (non-Hispanic)	882	49.75%
Black or African American (non-Hispanic)	11	0.62%
Native American	61	3.44%
Asian	19	1.07%
Pacific Islander	39	2.2%
Other/mixed	170	9.59%
Hispanic or Latino	591	33.33%

=== 2010 census ===
As of the 2010 census Decatur had a population of 1,699. The racial and ethnic makeup of the population was 62.4% non-Hispanic white, 0.5% non-Hispanic black, 4.3% Native American, 0.9% Asian, 5.2% from two or more races and 28.4% Hispanic or Latino.

=== 2000 census ===
As of the census of 2000, there were 1,314 people, 465 households, and 346 families residing in the city. The population density was 573.0 inhabitants per square mile (221.2/km^{2}). There were 535 housing units at an average density of 233.3 per square mile (90.1/km^{2}). The racial makeup of the city was 80.97% White, 5.48% Native American, 0.46% Asian, 10.12% from other races, and 2.97% from two or more races. 16.51% of the population were Hispanic or Latino of any race.

There were 465 households, out of which 44.7% had children under the age of 18 living with them, 52.3% were married couples living together, 15.7% had a female householder with no husband present, and 25.4% were non-families. 21.9% of all households were made up of individuals, and 9.5% had someone living alone who was 65 years of age or older. The average household size was 2.83 and the average family size was 3.23.

In the city, the population was spread out, with 32.0% under the age of 18, 9.8% from 18 to 24, 33.3% from 25 to 44, 16.1% from 45 to 64, and 8.8% who were 65 years of age or older. The median age was 29 years. For every 100 females, there were 111.6 males. For every 100 females age 18 and over, there were 103.0 males.

The median income for a household in the city was $29,844, and the median income for a family was $33,333. Males had a median income of $22,115 versus $19,125 for females. The per capita income for the city was $11,618. About 16.3% of families and 18.3% of the population were below the poverty line, including 23.2% of those under age 18 and 22.1% of those age 65 or over.

== Education ==
Public education for elementary and secondary school students is provided by the Decatur School District, leading to graduation from Decatur High School.

== See also ==
- Cooks Venture, defunct poultry company based in Decatur
