= Bard Springs Picnic Shelter =

- U.S. National Register of Historic Places
- Location within Arkansas Location within the United States
- Nearest city: Athens, Arkansas
- Coordinates: 34°23′27″N 94°0′34″W
- Area: less than one acre
- Built: 1936
- Built by: Civilian Conservation Corps
- Architectural style: Rustic
- MPS: Facilities Constructed by the CCC in Arkansas MPS
- NRHP reference No.: 93001076
- Added to NRHP: October 20, 1993

The Bard Springs Picnic Shelter is a historic recreational support facility in Ouachita National Forest. It is located at the Bard Springs recreation site, southeast of Mena and north of Athens in Polk County, off County Road 82 and Forest Road 106 on the banks of Blaylock Creek. It is a square open-air structure, with four rustic stone columns supporting a gabled roof. The foundation is stone, with the support columns set in concrete blocks. It was built in 1936 by a crew of the Civilian Conservation Corps, and is one of four surviving CCC structures (the others are two dams and a bathhouse) in the immediate area.

The shelter was listed on the National Register of Historic Places in 1993.

== See also ==
- National Register of Historic Places listings in Polk County, Arkansas
