= Athens, Arkansas =

Unincorporated community in Arkansas, US

Coordinates: 34°18′52″N 93°58′37″W

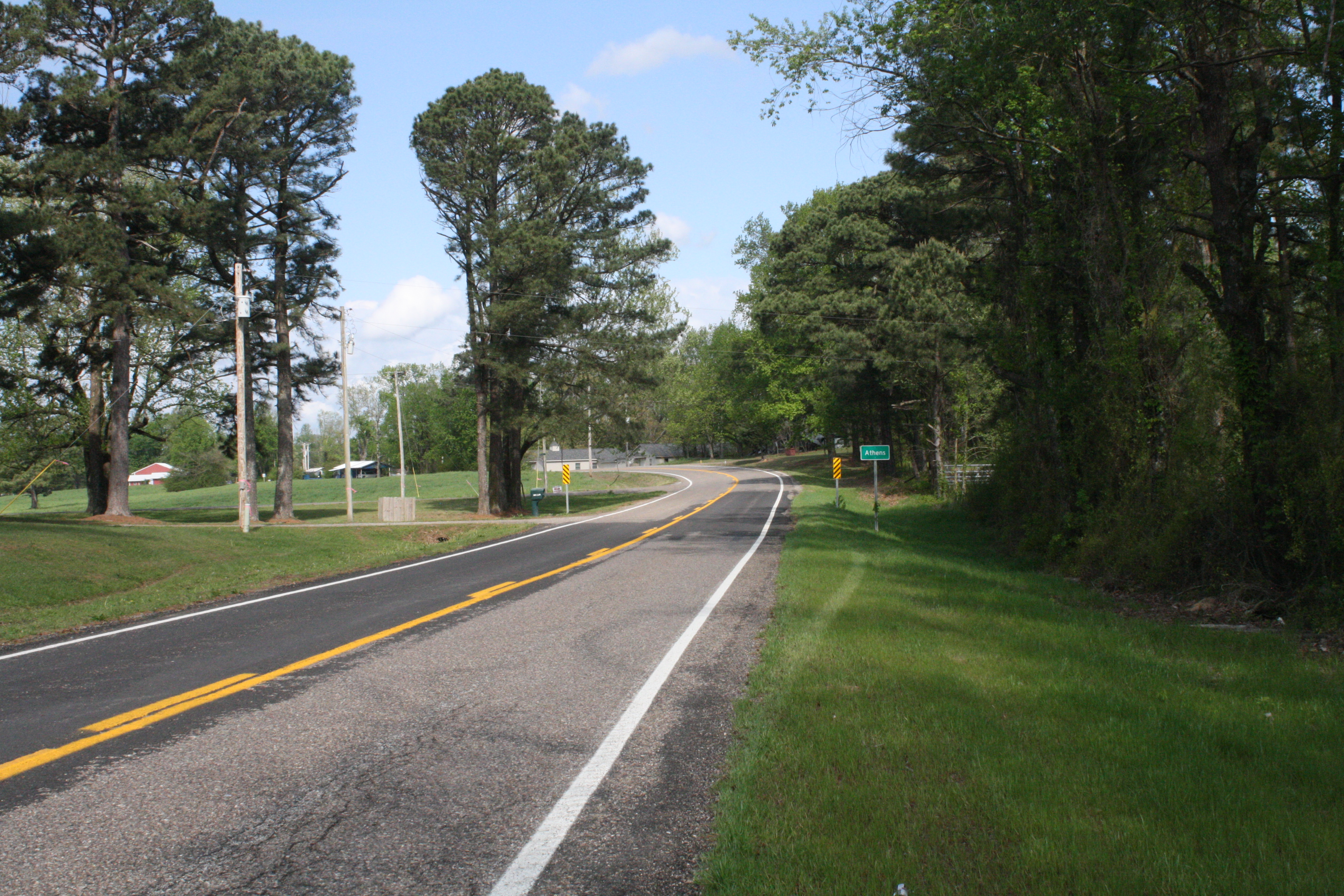
Sign for Athens along AR 84

Athens is an unincorporated community in the northeastern corner of Howard County, Arkansas, United States. It is located at the junction of Arkansas Highways 84 and 246.

== Historic sites ==
Athens includes (or is the nearest community to) a number of historic places, including the following ones which are all listed on the National Register of Historic Places:

- Bard Springs Bathhouse, FS Rd. 106 NW of Athens, Caney Cr. Wildlife Management Area, Ouachita NF
- Bard Springs Dam No. 1, FS Rd. 106 NW of Athens, Caney Cr. Wildlife Management Area, Ouachita NF
- Bard Springs Dam No. 2, FS Rd. 106 NW of Athens, Caney Cr. Wildlife Management Area, Ouachita NF
- Bard Springs Picnic Shelter, FS Rd. 106 NW of Athens, Caney Cr. Wildlife Management Area, Ouachita NF
- Buckeye Vista Overlook, Forest Service Rd. 38
- Shady Lake Bathhouse, Co. Rd. 64, Caney Cr. Wildlife Management Area, Ouachita NF
- Shady Lake Caretaker's House, FS Rd. 38, Caney Cr. Wildlife Management Area, Ouachita NF
- Shady Lake Dam, Co. Rd. 64, Caney Cr. Wildlife Management Area, Ouachita NF
- Shady Lake Picnic Pavilion, FS Rd. 38, Caney Cr. Wildlife Management Area, Ouachita NF
- Sugar Creek Vista Overlook, Forest Service Rd. 38
- Tall Peak Fire Tower, FS Rd. 38A NW of Athens, Caney Cr. Wildlife Management Area, Ouachita NF
