= Tall Peak Fire Tower =

- U.S. National Register of Historic Places
- Location within Arkansas Location within the United States
- Nearest city: Athens, Arkansas
- Coordinates: 34°23′11″N 94°2′33″W
- Area: less than one acre
- Built: 1938
- Built by: Civilian Conservation Corps
- Architectural style: Rustic
- MPS: Facilities Constructed by the CCC in Arkansas MPS
- NRHP reference No.: 93001077
- Added to NRHP: October 20, 1993

The Tall Peak Fire Tower is a historic fire tower in Ouachita National Forest. It is located at the top of Tall Peak in the southwestern part of the national forest in Polk County, Arkansas. It is a fieldstone structure, built about 1938 by a crew of the Civilian Conservation Corps (CCC), and features the distinctive flared corners that typify CCC architecture. It is accessible via a forest service road off Polk County 64 (also known as Forest Service Road 38).

The tower was listed on the National Register of Historic Places in 1993.
