= National Guard Armory (Mena, Arkansas) =

- U.S. National Register of Historic Places
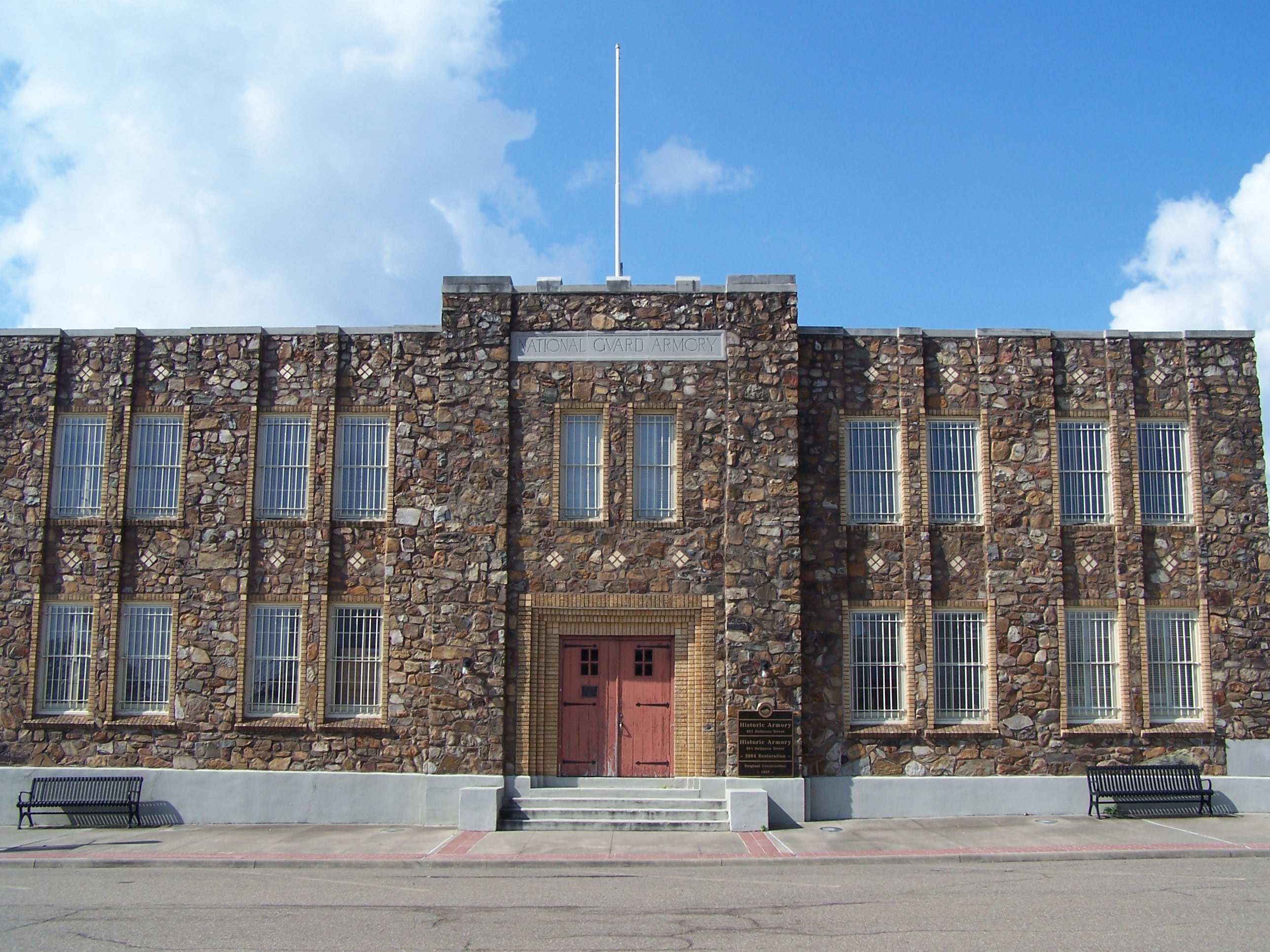

- Location within Arkansas Location within the United States
- Location: Jct. of DeQueen and Maple Sts., Mena, Arkansas
- Coordinates: 34°35′3″N 94°14′17″W
- Built: 1931
- Architect: Kyle, Derwood F.
- Architectural style: Art Deco, Rustic fieldstone
- NRHP reference No.: 91000682
- Added to NRHP: June 5, 1991

The National Guard Armory is a historic armory building at DeQueen and Maple Streets in Mena, Arkansas. It is a large single-story Art Deco building, fashioned out of fieldstone and concrete in 1931. It is the best example in Mena of a stone building style typically found in the more mountainous surrounding areas. It was designed by Derwood F. Kyle of Pine Bluff. The building currently serves as a community meeting space, as it was originally designed to include.

The building was listed on the National Register of Historic Places in 1991.

== See also ==
- National Register of Historic Places listings in Polk County, Arkansas
