= Bard Springs Bathhouse =

- U.S. National Register of Historic Places
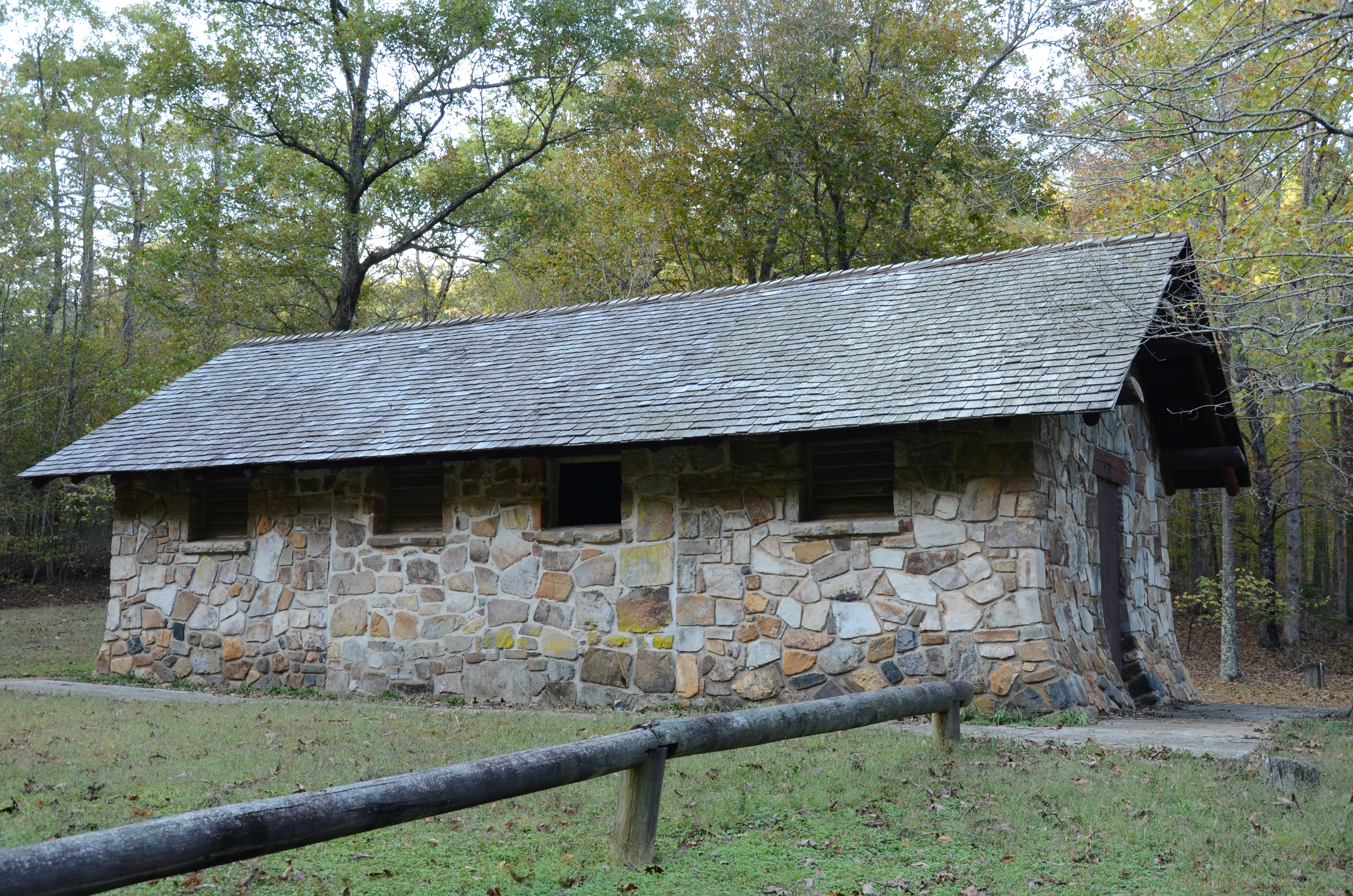

- Location within Arkansas Location within the United States
- Nearest city: Athens, Arkansas
- Coordinates: 34°23′26″N 94°0′38″W
- Area: less than one acre
- Built: 1936
- Built by: Civilian Conservation Corps
- Architectural style: Rustic
- MPS: Facilities Constructed by the CCC in Arkansas MPS
- NRHP reference No.: 93001073
- Added to NRHP: October 20, 1993

The Bard Springs Bathhouse is a historic recreational support facility in Ouachita National Forest. It is located at the Bard Springs recreation site, southeast of Mena and north of Athens in Polk County, off County Road 82 and Forest Road 106 on the banks of Blaylock Creek. It is a single story rustic stone structure, with entrances at either end into open areas for changing. The interior is lit by skylights in the roof. It was built in 1936 by a crew of the Civilian Conservation Corps, and is one of four surviving CCC structures (the others are two dams and a picnic shelter) in the immediate area.

The bathhouse was listed on the National Register of Historic Places in 1993.

== See also ==
- National Register of Historic Places listings in Polk County, Arkansas
