= National Guard Armory-Pine Bluff =

- National Guard Armory at Pine Bluff
- U.S. National Register of Historic Places
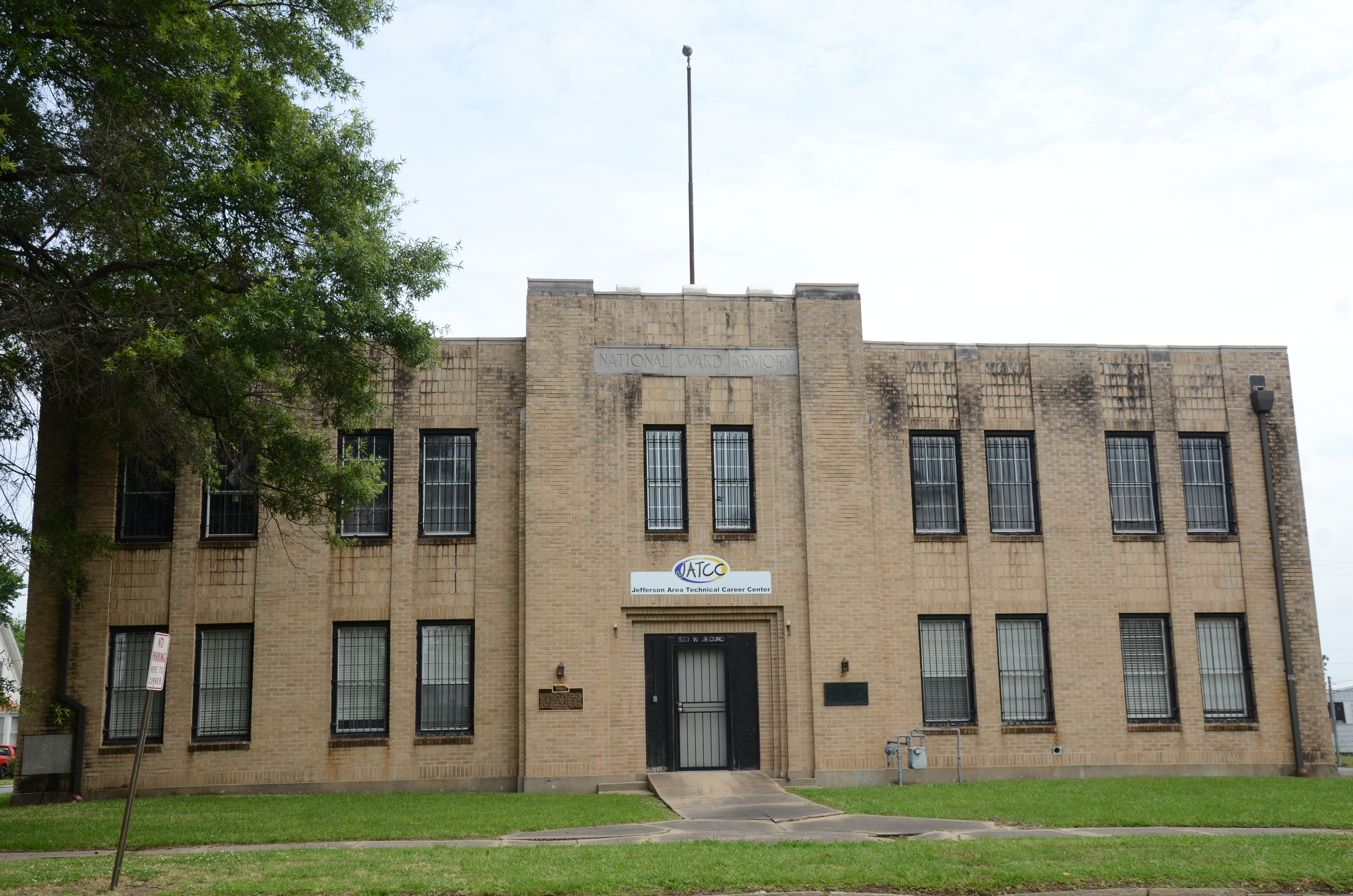
- Main façade of the National Guard Armory

- Location within Arkansas
- Location: 623 W. 2nd Avenue, Pine Bluff, Arkansas
- Coordinates: 34°13′44″N 92°0′32″W
- Area: less than one acre
- Built: 1931
- Architect: Durward F. Kyle, Quinn & Quinn
- Architectural style: Art Deco
- NRHP reference No.: 01000112
- Added to NRHP: February 16, 2001

The National Guard Armory at Pine Bluff is a former National Guard armory at 623 West 2nd Avenue in Pine Bluff, Arkansas. It is a two-story masonry structure, built out of concrete and buff brick with Art Deco styling, included a castellated parapet. It was built in 1931, and was the first state-owned militia building in Jefferson County. It served as a state armory until 1974, housing the 39th Tank Company.

The building was listed on the National Register of Historic Places in 2001.

== See also ==
- National Register of Historic Places listings in Jefferson County, Arkansas
