= Cove, Arkansas =

- Town
- Location of Cove in Polk County, Arkansas.
- Coordinates: 34°26′12″N 94°24′58″W
- Country: United States
- State: Arkansas
- County: Polk

Area
  - Total: 1.62 sq mi (4.20 km^{2})
  - Land: 1.60 sq mi (4.14 km^{2})
  - Water: 0.023 sq mi (0.06 km^{2})
- Elevation: 1,102 ft (336 m)

Population (2020)
  - Total: 319
  - Estimate (2025): 329 ▲
  - Density: 199.6/sq mi (77.07/km^{2})
- Time zone: UTC-6 (Central (CST))
  - Summer (DST): UTC-5 (CDT)
- ZIP code: 71937
- Area code: 870
- FIPS code: 05-15700
- GNIS feature ID: 2406326

Cove is a town in Polk County, Arkansas, United States. The population was 319 at the 2020 census.

== Geography ==
According to the United States Census Bureau, the town has a total area of 4.5 km^{2} (1.7 sq mi), all land.

== Demographics ==
Historical population
Census	Pop.	Note	%±
1930	482		—
1940	381		−21.0%
1950	405		6.3%
1960	320		−21.0%
1970	334		4.4%
1980	391		17.1%
1990	346		−11.5%
2000	383		10.7%
2010	382		−0.3%
2020	319		−16.5%
2025 (est.)	329	▲	3.1%
U.S. Decennial Census

As of the census of 2000, there were 383 people, 150 households, and 102 families residing in the town. The population density was 85.5 people/km^{2} (221 people/mi^{2}). There were 181 housing units at an average density of 40.4 units/km^{2} (105 units/mi^{2}). The racial makeup of the town was 94.78% White, 3.92% Native American, 0.26% from other races, and 1.04% from two or more races. 1.04% of the population were Hispanic or Latino of any race.

There were 150 households, out of which 38.0% had children under the age of 18 living with them, 53.3% were married couples living together, 9.3% had a female householder with no husband present, and 32.0% were non-families. 28.7% of all households were made up of individuals, and 14.0% had someone living alone who was 65 years of age or older. The average household size was 2.55 and the average family size was 3.17.

In the town, the population was spread out, with 29.8% under the age of 18, 10.7% from 18 to 24, 29.2% from 25 to 44, 16.7% from 45 to 64, and 13.6% who were 65 years of age or older. The median age was 32 years. For every 100 females, there were 112.8 males. For every 100 females age 18 and over, there were 100.7 males.

The median income for a household in the town was $17,368, and the median income for a family was $21,875. Males had a median income of $16,964 versus $17,500 for females. The per capita income for the town was $8,310. About 25.0% of families and 28.8% of the population were below the poverty line, including 35.0% of those under age 18 and 16.9% of those age 65 or over.

== Business and commerce ==
The town contains two franchised chain stores, Dollar General and Sunoco. Cove hardware is a feed store, lumber and hardware store.

== Education ==
Public education for early childhood, elementary and secondary school students is available from the Cossatot River School District, which includes Vandervoort (Van-Cove) Elementary School in Vandervoort, and Cossatot River High School. The high school formed in 2013, with the merger of Wickes High School and Van-Cove High School. The school's mascot is the Eagles and black and silver serve as the school colors.

On July 1, 2010, the former Van-Cove School District consolidated with the Wickes School District into the Cossatot River School District.

The city also is home to the Cove Library which adjacent to the Cove Town Hall on US-59. The library is part of the Polk County Library branch system.

== Transportation ==
While there is no transit service in Cove, intercity bus service is provided by Jefferson Lines in nearby Mena.
