= Vandervoort, Arkansas =

- Town
- Location of Vandervoort in Polk County, Arkansas.
- Coordinates: 34°22′47″N 94°21′53″W
- Country: United States
- State: Arkansas
- County: Polk

Area
  - Total: 0.29 sq mi (0.76 km^{2})
  - Land: 0.29 sq mi (0.75 km^{2})
  - Water: 0.0039 sq mi (0.01 km^{2})
- Elevation: 1,083 ft (330 m)

Population (2020)
  - Total: 115
  - Estimate (2025): 117 ▲
  - Density: 399.6/sq mi (154.29/km^{2})
- Time zone: UTC-6 (Central (CST))
  - Summer (DST): UTC-5 (CDT)
- ZIP code: 71972
- Area code: 870
- FIPS code: 05-71510
- GNIS feature ID: 2406791

Vandervoort is a town in Polk County, Arkansas, United States. As of the 2020 census, Vandervoort had a population of 115.

The place is named in honor of the mother of an important early-20th-century railway financier, Jan de Goeijen. Her maiden name was Van der Voort.

== Geography ==
Vandervoort is located at 34°22′47″N 94°21′53″W (34.379737, -94.364666).

According to the United States Census Bureau, the town has a total area of 0.7 km^{2} (0.3 mi^{2}), all land.

== Demographics ==
Historical population
Census	Pop.	Note	%±
1970	108		—
1980	98		−9.3%
1990	111		13.3%
2000	120		8.1%
2010	87		−27.5%
2020	115		32.2%
2025 (est.)	117	▲	1.7%
U.S. Decennial Census

As of the census of 2000, there were 120 people, 42 households, and 30 families residing in the town. The population density was 165.5/km^{2} (428.2/mi^{2}). There were 48 housing units at an average density of 66.2/km^{2} (171.3/mi^{2}). The racial makeup of the town was 87.50% White, 5.00% Black or African American, 1.67% Native American, 4.17% from other races, and 1.67% from two or more races. Hispanic or Latino of any race were 5.00% of the population.

There were 42 households, out of which 52.4% had children under the age of 18 living with them, 54.8% were married couples living together, 16.7% had a female householder with no husband present, and 26.2% were non-families. 21.4% of all households were made up of individuals, and 14.3% had someone living alone who was 65 years of age or older. The average household size was 2.86 and the average family size was 3.39.

In the town, the population was spread out, with 37.5% under the age of 18, 10.0% from 18 to 24, 25.0% from 25 to 44, 19.2% from 45 to 64, and 8.3% who were 65 years of age or older. The median age was 27 years. For every 100 females, there were 71.4 males. For every 100 females age 18 and over, there were 74.4 males.

The median income for a household in the town was $21,042, and the median income for a family was $28,750. Males had a median income of $21,875 versus $15,250 for females. The per capita income for the town was $8,135. There were 13.9% of families and 17.7% of the population living below the poverty line, including 13.2% of under eighteens and 14.3% of those over 64.

== Education ==
Public education for early childhood, elementary and secondary school students is available from the Cossatot River School District, which includes Vandervoort (Van-Cove) Elementary School in Vandervoort, and Cossatot River High School. The high school formed in 2013, with the merger of Wickes High School and Van-Cove High School.

On July 1, 2010, the former Van-Cove School District consolidated with the Wickes School District into the Cossatot River School District.

== Transportation ==
While there is no transit service in Vandervoort, intercity bus service is provided by Jefferson Lines in nearby Mena.
