= Wickes, Arkansas =

- City
- Location of Wickes in Polk County, Arkansas.
- Coordinates: 34°17′56″N 94°20′0″W
- Country: United States
- State: Arkansas
- County: Polk

Area
  - Total: 2.34 sq mi (6.06 km^{2})
  - Land: 2.32 sq mi (6.02 km^{2})
  - Water: 0.019 sq mi (0.05 km^{2})
- Elevation: 1,024 ft (312 m)

Population (2020)
  - Total: 637
  - Estimate (2025): 655 ▲
  - Density: 274.3/sq mi (105.89/km^{2})
- Time zone: UTC-6 (Central (CST))
  - Summer (DST): UTC-5 (CDT)
- ZIP code: 71973
- Area code: 870
- FIPS code: 05-75500
- GNIS feature ID: 2406884
- Website: wickes.gov

Wickes is a city in Polk County, Arkansas, United States. The population was 637 at the 2020 census.

Near Wickes is the Boggs Springs Youth Encampment of the American Baptist Association, a retreat of Missionary Baptist churches.

Wickes has historic places such as the 100-year-old City Hall, and the Lighthouse Drive-in.

Wickes is home to the Lawrence M. Magdovitz Memorial Library, a former U.S. Post Office that was donated to the Town of Wickes by the owner of the building in return for naming it after him.

== Geography ==
According to the United States Census Bureau, the town has a total area of 6.0 km^{2} (2.3 mi^{2}), of which 6.0 km^{2} (2.3 mi^{2}) is land and 0.43% is water.

Wickes is home of the western terminus of U.S. Route 278.

== Demographics ==
Historical population
Census	Pop.	Note	%±
1930	182		—
1940	121		−33.5%
1950	401		231.4%
1960	368		−8.2%
1970	409		11.1%
1980	464		13.4%
1990	570		22.8%
2000	675		18.4%
2010	754		11.7%
2020	637		−15.5%
2025 (est.)	655	▲	2.8%
U.S. Decennial Census

=== 2020 census ===
Wickes racial composition
Race	Number	Percentage
White (non-Hispanic)	246	38.62%
Black or African American (non-Hispanic)	2	0.31%
Native American	6	0.94%
Other/Mixed	32	5.02%
Hispanic or Latino	351	55.1%

As of the 2020 United States census, there were 637 people, 302 households, and 250 families residing in the town.

=== 2010 census ===
As of the 2010 census Wickes had a population of 754. The ethnic and racial composition of the population was 52.1% Hispanic or Latino, 44.3% non-Hispanic white, 0.4% African-American, 2.1% Native American and 2.4% reporting two or more races.

=== 2000 census ===
As of the census of 2000, there were 675 people, 222 households, and 174 families residing in the town. The population density was 112.3/km^{2} (290.6/mi^{2}). There were 256 housing units at an average density of 42.6/km^{2} (110.2/mi^{2}). The racial makeup of the town was 73.78% White, 3.26% Native American, 19.70% from other races, and 3.26% from two or more races. 31.70% of the population were Hispanic or Latino of any race.

There were 222 households, out of which 48.6% had children under the age of 18 living with them, 57.7% were married couples living together, 13.5% had a female householder with no husband present, and 21.6% were non-families. 19.8% of all households were made up of individuals, and 8.1% had someone living alone who was 65 years of age or older. The average household size was 3.04 and the average family size was 3.48.

In the town, the population was spread out, with 37.5% under the age of 18, 10.7% from 18 to 24, 29.5% from 25 to 44, 14.8% from 45 to 64, and 7.6% who were 65 years of age or older. The median age was 26 years. For every 100 females, there were 100.9 males. For every 100 females age 18 and over, there were 100.0 males.

The median income for a household in the town was $20,515, and the median income for a family was $22,292. Males had a median income of $19,659 versus $17,045 for females. The per capita income for the town was $7,572. About 27.6% of families and 37.1% of the population were below the poverty line, including 45.4% of those under age 18 and 10.6% of those age 65 or over.

== Education ==
Public education is provided for early childhood, elementary and secondary school students from the Cossatot River School District, which includes Wickes Elementary School, and Cossatot River High School. The high school formed in 2013, with the merger of Wickes High School and Van-Cove High School.

It was previously a part of the Wickes School District. On July 1, 2010, that district consolidated with the Van Cove School District into the Cossatot River School District.
