= CRHS =

CRHS is a four-letter acronym that may refer to a high school, health care system, or humane society:

- Canyon Ridge High School in Twin Falls, Idaho, United States
- Centennial Regional High School in Greenfield Park, Quebec, Canada
- Central Regional High School in Berkeley Township, New Jersey, United States
- Charlottetown Rural High School in Charlottetown, Prince Edward Island, Canada
- Cinco Ranch High School in Katy, Texas, United States
- Cedar Ridge High school in Round Rock, Texas, United States
- Coginchaug Regional High School in Durham, Connecticut, United States
- Columbia River High School in Vancouver, Washington, United States
- Coon Rapids High School in Coon Rapids, Minnesota, United States
- Coral Reef High School in Richmond Heights, Florida, United States
- Cossatot River High School in Polk County, Arkansas
- Coulee Region Humane Society, Inc in La Crosse County, Wisconsin, United States
- Crystal River High School in Crystal River, Florida, United States
- Cumberland Regional High School in Cumberland County, New Jersey, United States
- Columbus Regional Healthcare System in Muscogee County, Georgia, United States
- Cypress Ridge High School in Cypress, Texas, United States
- Cypress Ranch High School in Cypress, Texas, United States
