= Oden, Arkansas =

- Town
- Location in Montgomery County, Arkansas
- Coordinates: 34°37′25″N 93°47′26″W
- Country: United States
- State: Arkansas
- County: Montgomery

Area
  - Total: 0.84 sq mi (2.17 km^{2})
  - Land: 0.81 sq mi (2.11 km^{2})
  - Water: 0.023 sq mi (0.06 km^{2})
- Elevation: 827 ft (252 m)

Population (2020)
  - Total: 180
  - Estimate (2025): 183 ▲
  - Density: 221.0/sq mi (85.33/km^{2})
- Time zone: UTC-6 (Central (CST))
  - Summer (DST): UTC-5 (CDT)
- ZIP codes: 71961, 71966
- Area code: 870
- FIPS code: 05-51290
- GNIS feature ID: 2407035

Oden is a town in Montgomery County, Arkansas, United States. As of the 2020 census, its population was 180, down from 232 in 2010.

== Geography ==
Arkansas Highway 88 (Broadway Avenue) is the main road through the town, leading east 2.5 miles (4.0 km) to Pencil Bluff and west 28 miles (45 km) to Mena. Mount Ida, the Montgomery county seat, is 11 miles (18 km) southeast of Oden via AR 88 and US 270.

According to the United States Census Bureau, Oden has a total area of 0.84 square miles (2.2 km^{2}), of which 0.02 square miles (0.05 km^{2}), or 2.75%, are water. The Ouachita River flows past the south side of the town, outside the town limits.

== Demographics ==
Historical population
| Census | Pop. | Note | %± |
|---|---|---|---|
| 1940 | 102 | | — |
| 1950 | 133 | | 30.4% |
| 1960 | 90 | | −32.3% |
| 1970 | 141 | | 56.7% |
| 1980 | 186 | | 31.9% |
| 1990 | 126 | | −32.3% |
| 2000 | 220 | | 74.6% |
| 2010 | 232 | | 5.5% |
| 2020 | 180 | | −22.4% |
| 2025 (est.) | 183 | ▲ | 1.7% |
U.S. Decennial Census

As of the census of 2000, there were 220 people, 79 households, and 65 families residing in the town. The population density was 99.9/km^{2} (258.2/mi^{2}). There were 93 housing units at an average density of 42.2/km^{2} (109.1/mi^{2}). The racial makeup of the town was 96.4% White, 1.8% Native American, 0.9% Asian, 0.5% Pacific Islander, and 0.5% from two or more races.

There were 79 households, out of which 38.0% had children under the age of 18 living with them, 74.7% were married couples living together, 6.3% had a female householder with no husband present, and 17.7% were non-families. 16.5% of all households were made up of individuals, and 10.1% had someone living alone who was 65 years of age or older. The average household size was 2.78 and the average family size was 3.14.

In the town, the population was spread out, with 27.7% under the age of 18, 9.5% from 18 to 24, 25.0% from 25 to 44, 18.2% from 45 to 64, and 19.5% who were 65 years of age or older. The median age was 34 years. For every 100 females, there were 89.7 males. For every 100 females age 18 and over, there were 91.6 males.

The median income for a household in the town was $33,750, and the median income for a family was $36,563. Males had a median income of $21,944 versus $17,292 for females. The per capita income for the town was $12,610. About 7.6% of families and 12.8% of the population were below the poverty line, including 16.1% of those under the age of eighteen and 15.2% of those 65 or over.

== Education ==
Public education for elementary and secondary school students is provided by the Ouachita River School District, which includes Ode Maddox Elementary School and Oden High School. The Ouachita River School District was established by the merger of the Oden School District and the Acorn School District July 1, 2004.

Some nearby unincorporated areas are zoned to:

- Mount Ida School District, which leads to graduation from Mount Ida High School.
