= Acorn High School =

Location
- 143 Polk 96; Mena, Arkansas 71953; United States; 34°38′14″N 94°12′26″W

Information
- Founded: 1916 (110 years ago)
- School district: Ouachita River School District (since 2004)
- CEEB code: 041650
- NCES School ID: 050007300002
- Principal: Dewayne Taylor
- Teaching staff: 53.30 (FTE)
- Grades: 7-12
- Enrollment: 267 (2023-2024)
- Student to teacher ratio: 5.01
- Colors: Blue and gold
- Mascot: Tiger
- Team name: Acorn Tigers
- Website: www.ouachitariversd.org

Acorn High School is a public high school serving students in grades 7 through 12 and is located in Acorn, an unincorporated area in Polk County, Arkansas, United States, near Mena.

Acorn High School is one of four public high schools located in Polk County and one of two high schools administered by the Ouachita River School District. In 2012, Acorn High School was nationally recognized as a U.S. Department of Education Green Ribbon School (ED-GRS). The school's athletic teams have won ten state championships.

In addition to Acorn, the school serves a small section of the City of Mena.

== History ==
Since 1876, several schools have existed in the area near the modern school, first known as "Goardneck" (or "Gourdneck") due to the shape of the valley in which it sat. In subsequent years, various buildings were erected to serve as the school building for the local community renamed as "Acorn" assumed to be named so due to the abundance of oak trees. The first graduating class of Acorn High School was in 1916 with two students.

The school was initially a part of the Acorn School District. The Ouachita River district was established by the merger of the Oden School District and the Acorn School District on July 1, 2004.

== Academics ==
The assumed course of study that students complete is the Smart Core curriculum developed by the Arkansas Department of Education (ADE), which requires students to complete 22 units prior to graduation. Students complete regular (core and career focus) courses and exams and may select Advanced Placement (AP) coursework and exams that provide an opportunity to receive college credit. The school is accredited by the ADE.

In 2012, Acorn High School was nationally recognized as a selectee in the first-ever U.S. Department of Education Green Ribbon School (ED-GRS) recognition award program. The school campus includes a 15 acres (6.1 ha) outdoor classroom that includes a vegetable garden and a greenhouse, and students established a protection program for an endangered Ozark Chinquapin tree discovered near the campus. Acorn High School science teacher Kathy Rusert was honored as the 2012 Rural Teacher of the Year Award by the Arkansas Rural Education Association and was one of five educators in the nation named a 2012 National Project Learning Tree Outstanding Teacher.

== Extracurricular activities ==
The Acorn High School mascot is the tiger with blue and gold serving as the school colors.

The Acorn Tigers participate in the 1A Classification, the state’s smallest classification. The Tigers compete in golf (boys/girls), bowling (boys/girls), cross country (boys/girls), basketball (boys/girls), cheer, tennis (boys/girls), baseball, softball, and track and field (boys/girls).

- Cross country: The boys teams have won four state championships (1997, 1998, 2000, 2001). The girls team won consecutive state championships in 2011 and 2012.
- Tennis: The boys tennis team won a state championship in 2007.
- Track and field: The boys track and field team won consecutive state championships in 2007 and 2008. The girls team won consecutive state championships in 2011 and 2012.
