= Hatfield, Arkansas =

- Town
- Location of Hatfield in Polk County, Arkansas.
- Coordinates: 34°29′13″N 94°22′42″W
- Country: United States
- State: Arkansas
- County: Polk

Area
  - Total: 1.36 sq mi (3.51 km^{2})
  - Land: 1.34 sq mi (3.46 km^{2})
  - Water: 0.023 sq mi (0.06 km^{2})
- Elevation: 978 ft (298 m)

Population (2020)
  - Total: 345
  - Estimate (2025): 348 ▲
  - Density: 258.5/sq mi (99.82/km^{2})
- Time zone: UTC-6 (Central (CST))
  - Summer (DST): UTC-5 (CDT)
- ZIP code: 71945
- Area code: 870
- FIPS code: 05-30700
- GNIS feature ID: 2406653

Hatfield is a town in western Polk County, Arkansas, United States. As of the 2020 census, Hatfield had a population of 345.

== Geography ==
Hatfield is located at 34°29′13″N 94°22′42″W (34.486997, -94.378304).

According to the United States Census Bureau, the town has a total area of 3.5 km^{2} (1.4 sq mi), all land.

== Demographics ==
Historical population
Census	Pop.	Note	%±
1920	335		—
1930	382		14.0%
1940	437		14.4%
1950	364		−16.7%
1960	337		−7.4%
1970	377		11.9%
1980	410		8.8%
1990	414		1.0%
2000	402		−2.9%
2010	413		2.7%
2020	345		−16.5%
2025 (est.)	348	▲	0.9%
U.S. Decennial Census

As of the census of 2000, there were 402 people, 163 households, and 106 families residing in the town. The population density was 114.1 people /km^{2} (296 people/mi^{2}). There were 185 housing units at an average density of 52.5 units /km^{2} (136 units/mi^{2}). The racial makeup of the town was 95.52% White, 0.50% Black or African American, 1.49% Native American, and 2.49% from two or more races. 1.24% of the population were Hispanic or Latino of any race.

There were 163 households, out of which 28.8% had children under the age of 18 living with them, 52.8% were married couples living together, 10.4% had a female householder with no husband present, and 34.4% were non-families. 31.9% of all households were made up of individuals, and 19.0% had someone living alone who was 65 years of age or older. The average household size was 2.47 and the average family size was 3.07.

In the town, the population was spread out, with 25.4% under the age of 18, 8.7% from 18 to 24, 21.9% from 25 to 44, 25.4% from 45 to 64, and 18.7% who were 65 years of age or older. The median age was 39 years. For every 100 females, there were 90.5 males. For every 100 females age 18 and over, there were 89.9 males.

The median income for a household in the town was $19,412, and the median income for a family was $23,750. Males had a median income of $18,438 versus $16,875 for females. The per capita income for the town was $10,447. About 22.6% of families and 25.6% of the population were below the poverty line, including 44.7% of those under age 18 and 16.7% of those age 65 or over.

== Climate ==
The climate in this area is characterized by hot, humid summers and generally mild to cool winters. According to the Köppen Climate Classification system, Hatfield has a humid subtropical climate, abbreviated "Cfa" on climate maps.

== Education ==
Residents are assigned to schools in the Mena School District.

On July 1, 2004, the Hatfield School District was consolidated into the Mena School District.

== Transportation ==
While there is no transit service in Hatfield, intercity bus service is provided by Jefferson Lines in nearby Mena.

== Other ==
The headquarters of the Christian Motorcyclists Association is located in Hatfield.
