= Cossatot River High School =

Location
- 6330 US-71; Cove, Polk County, Arkansas 71937; United States
- Coordinates: 34°23′00″N 94°23′13″W

Information
- School district: Cossatot River School District
- Teaching staff: 44.50 (FTE)
- Grades: 7-12
- Enrollment: 385 (2023-2024)
- Student to teacher ratio: 8.65
- Communities served: Vandervoort, Cove, Wickes
- Website: sites.google.com/cossatot.us/crhs

Cossatot River High School (CRHS) is a public high school in unincorporated Polk County, Arkansas, near Vandervoort and Cove. It is a part of the Cossatot River School District and serves Vandervoot, Cove, and Wickes.

The school, on a 2.25-acre (0.91 ha) plot of land opened in 2013. The building had a cost of $15 million. It was formed as a consolidation of Wickes High School and Van-Cove High School.
