= Acorn, Arkansas =

Coordinates: 34°38′34″N 94°12′04″W

- Census-designated place
- Location within Arkansas Location within the United States
- Country: United States
- State: Arkansas
- County: Polk
- Elevation: 1,076 ft (328 m)

Population (2020)
  - Total: 376
- Time zone: UTC-6 (Central (CST))
  - Summer (DST): UTC-5 (CDT)
- GNIS feature ID: 2805613

Acorn, Arkansas is an unincorporated community and census-designated place (CDP) in Polk County, Arkansas, United States, approximately 6 miles north of Mena. The town is located at the junction of U.S. Route 59, U.S. Route 71 and U.S. Route 270 in the northern part of the county. Though Acorn is only a three-way junction, it marks the end of three separate U.S. highway concurrencies: U.S. 59 & 71 from Texarkana, U.S. 59 & 270 from Heavener, Oklahoma, and U.S. 71 & 270 from "Y" City.

It was first listed as a CDP in the 2020 census with a population of 376.

== Education ==
It is home to the Acorn branch of the Ouachita River School District, including Acorn Elementary School and Acorn High School.

The Ouachita River district was established by the merger of the Acorn School District and the Oden School District on July 1, 2004.

== Demographics ==
Historical population
Census	Pop.	Note	%±
2020	376		—
U.S. Decennial Census; 2020

Acorn first appeared as a census designated place in the 2020 U.S. census.

=== 2020 census ===
Acorn CDP, Arkansas – Racial and ethnic composition Note: the U.S. census treats Hispanic/Latino as an ethnic category. This table excludes Latinos from the racial categories and assigns them to a separate category. Hispanics/Latinos may be of any race.
Race / Ethnicity (NH = Non-Hispanic)	Pop 2020	% 2020
White alone (NH)	320	85.11%
Black or African American alone (NH)	1	0.27%
Native American or Alaska Native alone (NH)	9	2.39%
Asian alone (NH)	0	0.00%
Pacific Islander alone (NH)	0	0.00%
Some Other Race alone (NH)	0	0.00%
Mixed Race or Multi-Racial (NH)	33	8.78%
Hispanic or Latino (any race)	13	3.46%
Total	376	100.00%

== Transportation ==
While there is no transit service in Acorn, intercity bus service is provided by Jefferson Lines in nearby Mena.
