= Dallas, Arkansas =

Dallas, Polk County, Arkansas
- Unincorporated community
- Dallas' position in Arkansas. Dallas, Polk County, Arkansas (the United States)
- Coordinates: 34°32′09″N 94°13′09″W
- Country: United States
- State: Arkansas
- County: Polk
- Elevation: 1,099 ft (335 m)
- Time zone: UTC-6 (Central (CST))
  - Summer (DST): UTC-5 (CDT)
- GNIS feature ID: 76742

Dallas is an unincorporated community in Polk County, Arkansas, United States. The community is approximately three miles south of Mena.

== History ==
Pioneers arrived in Polk County around 1830, mainly from Tennessee, Illinois and Kentucky. They settled near Dallas, surviving off the area's abundant wild game, and building shelters from its rich timber resources.

Polk County was created by the state's General Assembly in 1844, with Dallas as its county seat. The village was named for Vice-President George M. Dallas.

The first Polk County courthouse was located in Dallas, but was destroyed by fire. In 1869 a second courthouse was built, which was also destroyed by fire, in 1883.

Dallas became a regional center due to its location along Long's Trail, a stagecoach route which connected to the Butterfield Overland Mail Trail to the north, and passed west into what is now Oklahoma. At one time, Dallas had three mills, livery stables, boarding houses, two churches, several stores, and a weekly newspaper.

Arthur Edward Stilwell built the Kansas City, Pittsburg and Gulf Railroad (now the Kansas City Southern) from Kansas City, Missouri to Port Arthur, Texas during the 1890s. Nearby Mena was selected as the site for his railway stop, and train service to Mena began in 1896.

A special election was held in 1898, and residents voted to move the county seat to Mena.

Dallas Creek flows through the village, and Dallas Cemetery is located east of the community.
