= Umpire School District =

Defunct school district in Arkansas, United States

The Umpire School District or Umpire Public Schools was a school district headquartered in Umpire, Arkansas.

It operated Umpire Public School, divided into Umpire Elementary School and Umpire High School.

On July 1, 2004, the district was consolidated into the Wickes School District. On July 1, 2010, that district consolidated into the Cossatot River School District.

In the 26-27 academic year, Act 919 of 2025 made Umpire break away from Cossatot River to become its own Independent School District. In 2023 Cossatot River tried to vote to close the Umpire K-12 Campus, but it failed, opening on August 11, 2026. Umpire is one of the four isolated school districts to break away.
