= Ouachita River School District =

School district in Arkansas, United States

Location
- 143 Polk Road 96; Mena, Arkansas 71953 United States

District information
- Grades: PK–12
- Superintendent: Jerry Strasner
- Accreditation: Arkansas Department of Education
- Schools: 4
- NCES District ID: 0500073

Students and staff
- Students: 774
- Teachers: 64.54 (on FTE basis)
- Staff: 140.54 (on FTE basis)
- Student–teacher ratio: 11.99
- Athletic conference: 1A Region 7
- District mascot: Tigers (Acorn); Timberwolves (Oden)
- Colors: Acorn: Blue Gold; Oden: Black Orange

Other information
- Website: www.ouachitariversd.org

Ouachita River School District (ORSD) is a public school district located along the Ouachita River and is headquartered in Acorn, an unincorporated area in Polk County, Arkansas, United States, near Mena.

The Oauchita River School District provides early childhood, elementary, and secondary education to students in pre-kindergarten to twelfth grade at its four facilities and serving 351.08 acres (142.08 ha) of land in Polk County, Scott County and Montgomery County.

The service area includes Acorn, Oden, a small portion of Mena, Sims, and Pencil Bluff.

Ouachita River School District is accredited by the Arkansas Department of Education (ADE) and AdvancED.

Acorn Schools are located on U.S. Highway 71 north of Mena in Polk County.

Oden Schools are located on Arkansas Highway 88 between Pencil Bluff and Pine Ridge in Montgomery County.

== History ==
The district was established by the merger of the Acorn School District and the Oden School District on July 1, 2004.

== Schools ==
Secondary schools:

- Acorn High School— serving more than 300 students in grades 7 to 12.
- Oden High School— serving more than 100 students in grades 7 to 12.

Elementary schools:

- Acorn Elementary School— serving more than 275 students in pre-kindergarten to grade 6.
- Ode Maddox Elementary School— serving more than 125 students in pre-kindergarten to grade 6.
