= Oden High School =

Location
- 135 School Drive; Oden, Arkansas 71961; United States
- Coordinates: 34°37′12″N 93°46′48″W

Information
- Type: Public secondary education
- School district: Ouachita River School District (2004-); Oden School District (-2004)
- CEEB code: 041880
- NCES School ID: 050007301642
- Principal: William Edwards
- Teaching staff: 27.88 (on FTE basis)
- Grades: nursery–12th
- Enrollment: 148 (2023–2024)
- Student to teacher ratio: 5.31
- Color(s): Black and orange
- Mascot: Gray wolf
- Team name: Oden Timberwolves
- Newspaper: Wolf Tracks
- Website: www.ouachitariversd.org

Oden High School is a public six-year high school located along Arkansas Highway 88 in Oden, Arkansas, United States. Oden is one of three public high schools in Montgomery County and one of two high schools of the Ouachita River School District. For 2010–11, the school enrollment was 256 students occupying grades 7 through 12.

The school was initially a part of the Oden School District. The Ouachita River district was established by the merger of the Acorn School District and the Oden School District on July 1, 2004.

== Academics ==
The assumed course of study follows the Smart Core curriculum developed by the Arkansas Department of Education (ADE). Students complete regular (core and career focus) courses and exams and may select Advanced Placement (AP) coursework and exams that provide an opportunity for college credit. The school is accredited by the ADE.

== Athletics ==
The Oden High School mascot and athletic emblem are the Timberwolves with black and orange serving as the school colors.

For 2012–14, the Oden Timberwolves participate in the 1A Classification from the 1A 7 North Conference, as administered by the Arkansas Activities Association. The Timberwolves compete golf (boys), basketball (boys/girls), baseball, softball.
