= Board Camp, Arkansas =

- Census-designated place
- Location within Arkansas Location within the United States
- Coordinates: 34°32′13″N 94°05′20″W
- Country: United States
- State: Arkansas
- County: Polk
- Elevation: 968 ft (295 m)

Population (2020)
  - Total: 87
- Time zone: UTC-6 (Central (CST))
  - Summer (DST): UTC-5 (CDT)
- ZIP code: 71932
- Area code: 479
- GNIS feature ID: 2805625

Board Camp is an unincorporated community and census-designated place (CDP) in Polk County, Arkansas, United States. Board Camp is located on Arkansas Highway 8, 8.5 miles (13.7 km) east-southeast of Mena. Board Camp has a post office with ZIP code 71932.

It was first listed as a CDP in the 2020 census with a population of 87.

== Demographics ==
Historical population
Census	Pop.	Note	%±
2020	87		—
U.S. Decennial Census; 2020

Board Camp first appeared as a census designated place in the 2020 U.S. census.

=== 2020 census ===
Board Camp CDP, Arkansas – Racial and ethnic composition Note: the U.S. census treats Hispanic/Latino as an ethnic category. This table excludes Latinos from the racial categories and assigns them to a separate category. Hispanics/Latinos may be of any race.
Race / Ethnicity (NH = Non-Hispanic)	Pop 2020	% 2020
White alone (NH)	79	90.80%
Black or African American alone (NH)	0	0.00%
Native American or Alaska Native alone (NH)	0	0.00%
Asian alone (NH)	0	0.00%
Pacific Islander alone (NH)	0	0.00%
Some Other Race alone (NH)	3	3.45%
Mixed Race or Multi-Racial (NH)	1	1.15%
Hispanic or Latino (any race)	4	4.60%
Total	87	100.00%

== Transportation ==
While there is no transit service in Board Camp, intercity bus service is provided by Jefferson Lines in nearby Mena.
