= Cossatot River School District =

School district in Arkansas, United States

Location
- 130 School Drive; Wickes, Arkansas 71973 United States

District information
- Grades: PK–12
- Accreditation: Arkansas Department of Education
- Schools: 6
- NCES District ID: 0500405

Students and staff
- Students: 1,154
- Teachers: 90.31 (on FTE basis)
- Staff: 194.31 (on FTE basis)
- Student–teacher ratio: 13.13
- Athletic conference: 1A 7 West (2012–14)
- District mascot: Wildcat (Umpire); Eagles (CRHS)
- Colors: Umpire Wildcats: Blue; White; CRHS Eagles: Black; Silver

Other information
- Website: www.cossatot.us

Cossatot River School District is a public school district located along the Cossatot River and is based in Wickes, Arkansas, United States. The Cossatot River School District provides early childhood, elementary and secondary education for more than 1,150 prekindergarten through grade 12 students at its six facilities.

The school district was formed by the merger of the former Wickes School District and Van–Cove School District on July 1, 2010; together the Cossatot River School District encompasses 475.60 square miles (1,231.8 km^{2}) of land, in Polk, Sevier, and Howard counties.

The district serves the communities of Cove, Vandervoot, Wickes, Grannis, and Umpire.

Cossatot River School District and its schools are accredited by the Arkansas Department of Education (ADE). All high schools participate in the 1A 7 West Conference as sanctioned by the Arkansas Activities Association.

== Schools ==
Secondary schools:

- Umpire High School (Umpire, Howard County)—serving more than 50 students in grades 7 through 12.
- Cossatot River High School (Unincorporated, Polk County)—serving more than 400 students in grades 7 through 12.
  - Opened in 2013

Elementary schools:

- Van–Cove Elementary School (Vandervoort, Polk County)—serving more than 250 students in prekindergarten through grade 6.
- Wickes Elementary School (Wickes, Polk County)—serving more than 325 students in prekindergarten through grade 6.
- Umpire Elementary School (Umpire)

The ADE recognized Van–Cove as a 2011 High Progress Exemplary School.

Former schools:

- Wickes High School and Van-Cove High School.
