= Van–Cove High School =

Location
- 110 South 5th Street; Cove, Polk County, Arkansas 71937; United States
- Coordinates: 34°25′56″N 94°24′57″W

Information
- School type: Public comprehensive
- Status: Closed
- School district: Van-Cove School District (-2010); Cossatot River School District (2010-2013)
- CEEB code: 040525
- NCES School ID: 050040501105
- Teaching staff: 16.99 (on FTE basis)
- Grades: 7–12
- Enrollment: 197 (2010–11)
  - Grade 7: 34
  - Grade 8: 36
  - Grade 9: 31
  - Grade 10: 35
  - Grade 11: 30
  - Grade 12: 31
- Student to teacher ratio: 11.60
- Education system: ADE Smart Core
- Classes offered: Regular, Advanced Placement (AP)
- Campus type: Rural
- Colors: Red and white
- Athletics: Bowling, golf, basketball, track, cheer
- Athletics conference: 1A Region 7 West (2012–14)
- Mascot: Hornet
- Team name: Van–Cove Hornets
- Accreditation: ADE
- Communities served: Vandervoort, Cove
- Feeder schools: Van–Cove Ełementary School
- Affiliation: Arkansas Activities Association
- Federal funding: Title I

Van–Cove High School was a comprehensive public high school located in Cove, Arkansas, United States. The school provided secondary education in grades 7 through 12 serving rural, distant communities of Polk County, Arkansas, primarily Vandervoort and Cove, hence Van–Cove. At the time of closure it was a part of the Cossatot River School District.

Prior to July 1, 2010, Van–Cove High School was part of the former Van–Cove School District; on that day the Van-Cove district merged into the Cossatot River district. The Cossatot River School District merged Van–Cove High School with Wickes High School into the Cossatot River High School, which opened in 2013.

== Academics ==
The assumed course of study followed the Smart Core curriculum developed by the Arkansas Department of Education (ADE), which requires students complete at least 22 units prior to graduation. Students complete regular coursework and exams and may take Advanced Placement (AP) courses and exam with the opportunity to receive college credit. Van–Cove High School is accredited by the ADE.

== Extracurricular activities ==
The Van–Cove High School mascot and athletic emblem was the Hornet with red and white serving as the school colors.

=== Athletics ===
The Van–Cove Hornets competed in interscholastic activities within the 1A Classification, the state's smallest classification administered by the Arkansas Activities Association. The Hornets played within the 1A Region 7 West Conference. The Hornets participated in golf (boys/girls), bowling (boys/girls), basketball (boys/girls), cheer, and track (boys/girls).

- Basketball: The girls basketball teams won consecutive basketball state championships in 1996 and 1997.
