= Umpire, Arkansas =

- Unincorporated community
- Location within Arkansas Location within the United States
- Coordinates: 34°16′44″N 94°03′03″W
- Country: United States
- State: Arkansas
- County: Howard
- Elevation: 846 ft (258 m)
- Time zone: UTC-6 (Central (CST))
  - Summer (DST): UTC-5 (CDT)
- ZIP code: 71971
- GNIS feature ID: 78611

Umpire (also Busby) is an unincorporated community in Howard County, Arkansas, United States. It has frequently been noted on lists of unusual place names. This was the boyhood home of the American Business man Dave Pinson. He attended Umpire School from K-12th grade

== History ==
In the early 1890s a new gristmill opened in the area. There was a celebratory baseball game after which a schoolteacher addressed the crowd and suggested the name Umpire for the new post office. That is because the umpire did an outstanding job overseeing the game.

On April 24, 2011, an EF1 tornado causing some damage, traveled from Umpire to Mineola parallel to Arkansas State Route 84. On April 13, 2018, an EF2 tornado caused some damage travelled from Kirby Road north crossing Battle Hill Road, then Highway 278 to Shady Lake in the Ouachita National Forest.

== Education ==
Public education for early childhood, elementary and secondary school students is available from the Cossatot River School District, which includes the Umpire Schools: Umpire Elementary School and Umpire High School. The school's mascot is the Wildcats and blue and white serve as the school colors. There is also a small Seventh-day Adventist School in Umpire.

On July 1, 2004, the former Umpire School District was consolidated into the Wickes School District. On July 1, 2010, that district consolidated into the Cossatot River district.
