= Janssen Park =

- U.S. National Register of Historic Places
- U.S. Historic district
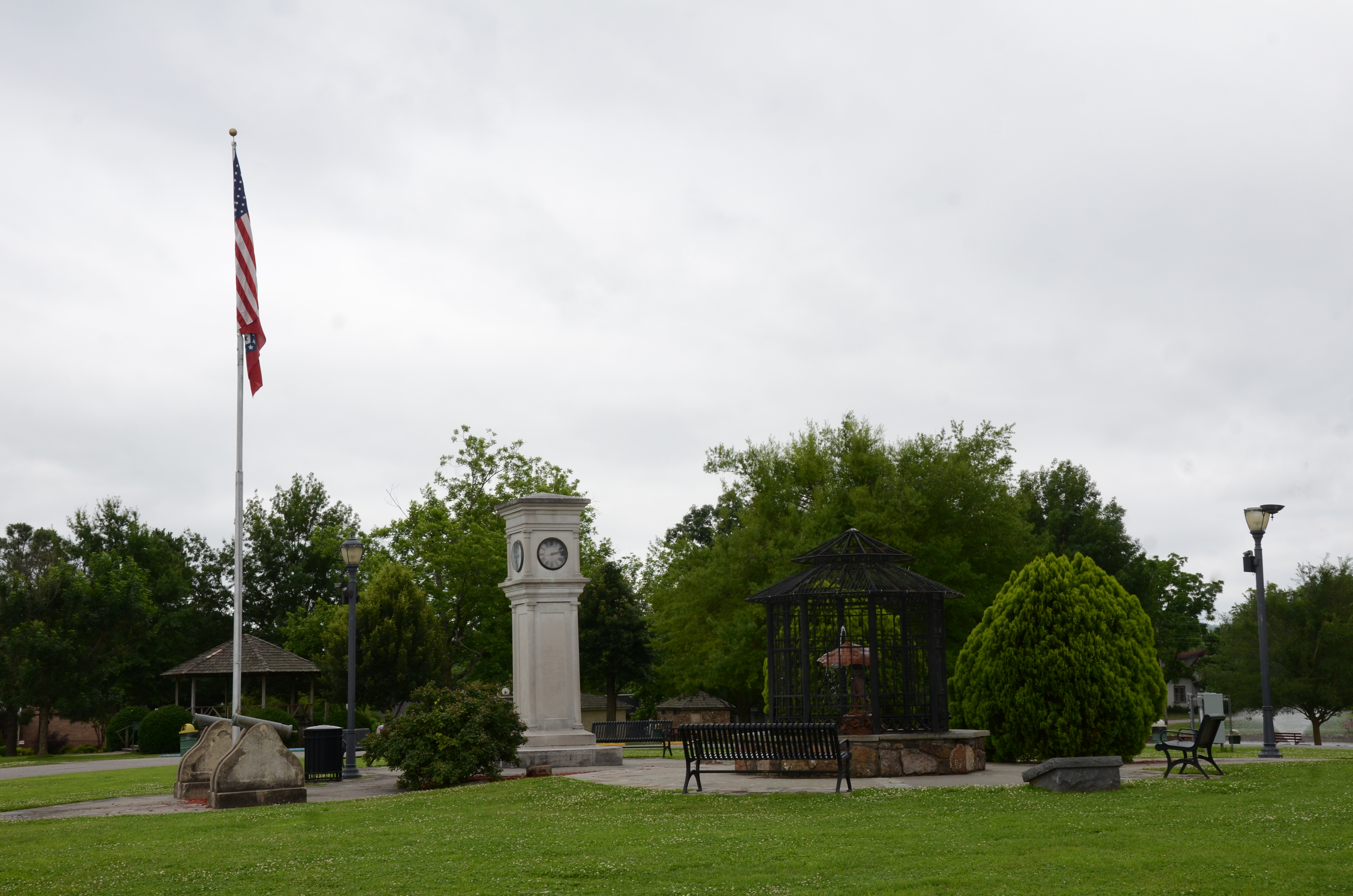

- Location within Arkansas Location within the United States
- Location: Off AR 8, Mena, Arkansas
- Area: 11 acres (4.5 ha)
- Built: 1851
- Built by: William Shelton
- NRHP reference No.: 79000448
- Added to NRHP: December 13, 1979

Janssen Park is a municipal park in the heart of the city of Mena, Arkansas. It is bounded by Janssen and Port Arthur Avenues, and 9th and 7th Streets. The park is a large grassy expanse with occasional mature trees, and features walkways radiating from a central drive, which circles around Mena's oldest building, the c. 1850s Shelton log cabin. A pair of ponds are located in the park's southern quadrant, and there is a clocktower within the circle near the cabin. The park was laid out in 1896, the year of the city's founding, but was not properly developed until ten years later. The park was listed on the National Register of Historic Places in 1979.

== Gallery ==
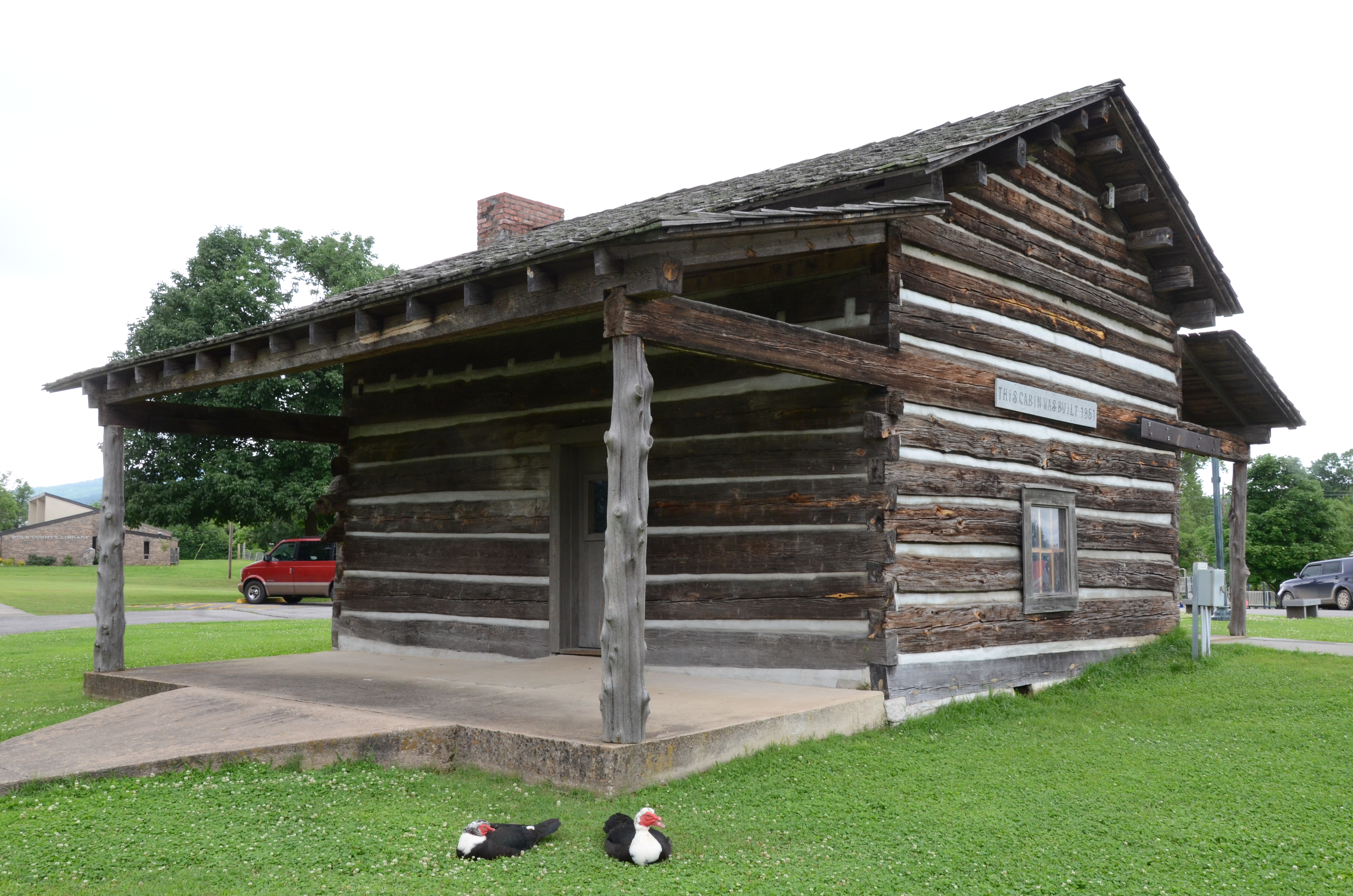
Wooden hut

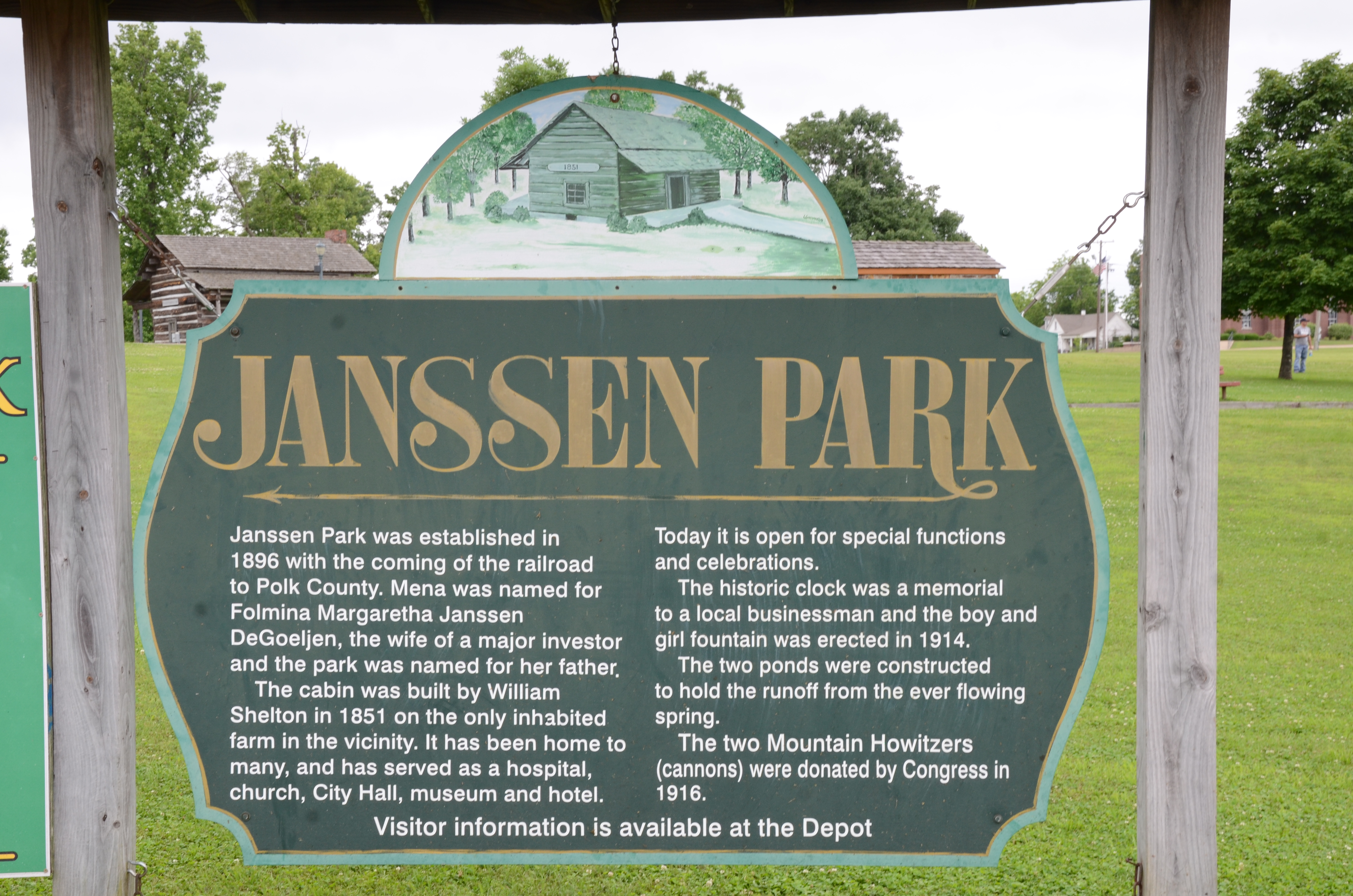
Entrance sign

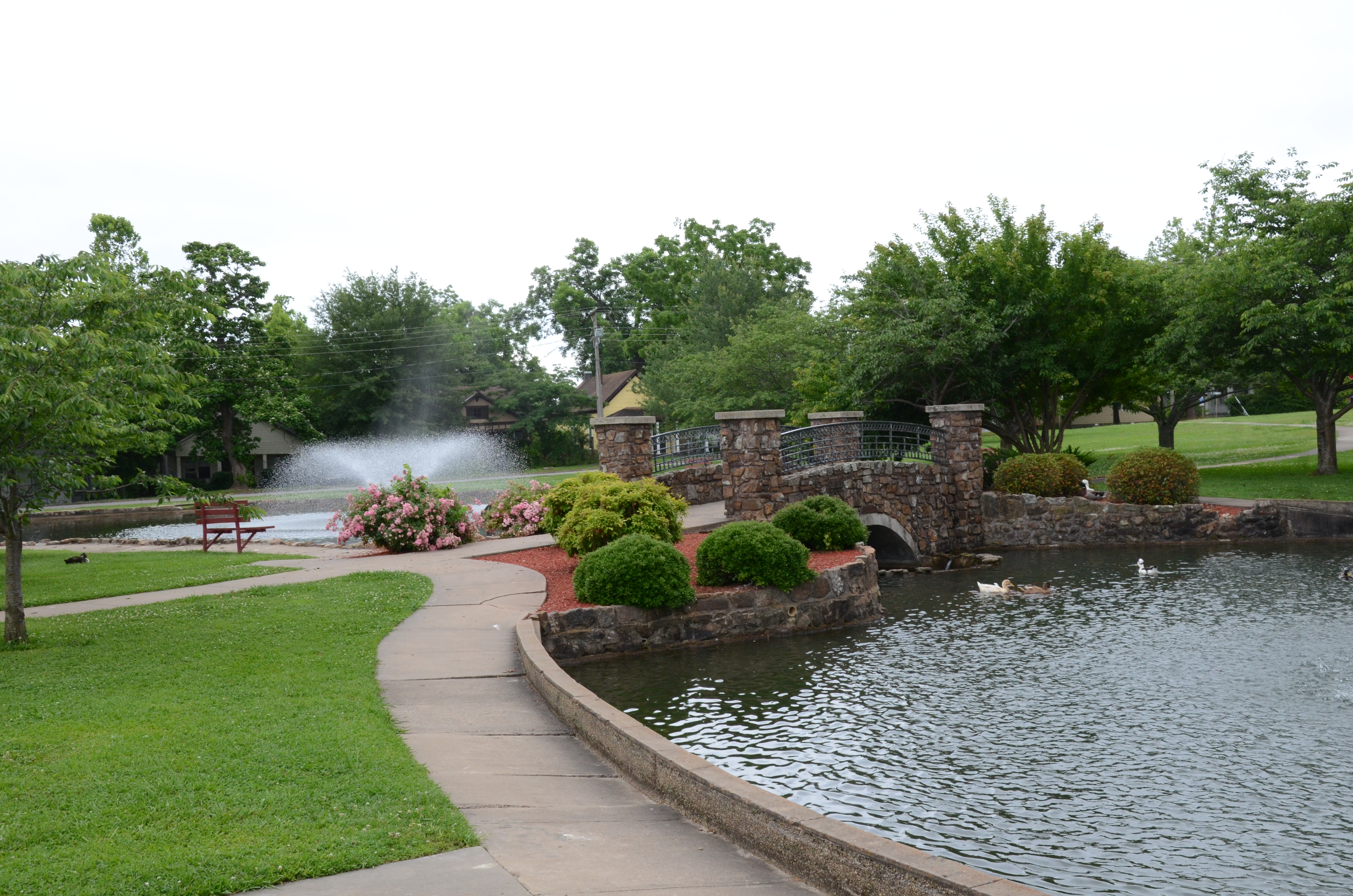
Bridge over lake and water fountain

== See also ==
- National Register of Historic Places listings in Polk County, Arkansas
