= Mena School District =

School district in Arkansas, United States

Address
- 501 Hickory Avenue Mena, Arkansas, 71953; United States

District information
- Type: Public
- Grades: PreK–12
- NCES District ID: 0509750

Students and staff
- Students: 1,734
- Teachers: 148.68
- Staff: 114.01
- Student–teacher ratio: 11.66

Other information
- Website: www.menaschools.org

Mena School District is a school district in Polk County, Arkansas.

On July 1, 2004, the Hatfield School District was consolidated into the Mena School District.

== Schools ==
The District includes:

- Holly Harshman Elementary School
- Louise Durham Elementary School
- Mena Middle School
- Mena High School

KJBS-LP
- Mena, Arkansas; United States
- Frequency: 101.1 MHz

Programming
- Format: Variety

Ownership
- Owner: Mena Public School Board

History
- First air date: February 2004
- Former call signs: KRMN-LP (2002–2017)

Technical information
- Licensing authority: FCC
- Facility ID: 134109
- Class: L1
- ERP: 100 watts
- HAAT: 7 meters (23 feet)
- Transmitter coordinates: 34°36′42″N 94°13′44″W

Links
- Public license information: LMS

== Radio station ==
The Mena School District operates KJBS-LP (101.1 FM), a low powered radio station licensed to serve Mena, Arkansas. It airs a Variety format.

KJBS was formerly KRMN-LP and was assigned in 2002, and owned by Rich Mountain Community College. It was transferred to the Mena School District in 2008, and changed its call letters to KJBS in 2017. The college made this move as they had an application for a full-power station before the Commission and, per FCC rules, a licensee of a low-power station cannot also be the licensee of a full-power station.
