= Christian Motorcyclists Association =

International non-profit organization

- Founded: 1975
- Founder: Herb Shreve
- Type: Evangelical Non-governmental organization
- Purpose: Proselytizing/evangelizing the Christian faith
- Location: Hatfield, Arkansas
- Members: Over 125,000
- Website: www.cmainternational.org

The Christian Motorcyclists Association (CMA) is an international Christian non-profit organization established in 1975. Its purpose is evangelizing to the motorcycling community.

== History ==
CMA was started by Herb Shreve, an Arkansas pastor who purchased a motorcycle to close the generation gap with his rebellious son. He began evangelizing motorcycle rallies, and in 1975, he resigned from his church to start CMA.

The organization grew to over 125,000 members and over 1200 chapters in all 50 states, and then gained chapters in 31 foreign countries, through the CMA International Ministry. René Changuion started CMA South Africa in 1980 and was the first country to be in the CMA International Coalition, now called CMA International. The UK organization was formed in 1983 when members of the Christian Bikers Association, established in the UK in 1979, approached the CMA in the USA and South Africa.

== Organization ==
CMA is not a club but a ministry. This distinguishes CMA from other biker motorcycle clubs that associate due to manufacturer brand loyalty or riding style. CMA's ministry team program is designed to "make ministers of their members." This implies a breakdown of the traditional distinction between clergy and laity that exist in most Christian ministries. Members are associated with the national organization and then independently may become members of local chapters.

CMA operates under a Board of Directors working in conjunction with six regional evangelists, a Lead evangelist, and Special Projects Evangelist, in order to support the goals and objectives of the organization. The current Chairman is John Ogden, Sr. This leadership team oversees CMA from a national level by appointing other state, area, and local leaders across the country. The headquarters is in Hatfield, Arkansas.

CMA publishes a monthly magazine, Heartbeat. The CMA is a member of Evangelical Council for Financial Accountability (ECFA) and Evangelical Press Association (EPA).

CMA (UK), which has an estimated 1,000 members, has an outreach arm called Holy Joe's whose members provide a cafe and helmet park at motorcycling shows and events. Proceeds from these and HJ's annual bike show are donated to charities such as emergency medical motorcycle couriers Freewheelers EVS.
