= Mineola, Arkansas =

- Unincorporated community
- Location within Arkansas Location within the United States
- Coordinates: 34°18′48″N 94°01′51″W
- Country: United States
- State: Arkansas
- County: Howard
- Elevation: 988 ft (301 m)
- Time zone: UTC-6 (Central (CST))
  - Summer (DST): UTC-5 (CDT)
- GNIS feature ID: 72690

Mineola (also Minieola) is an unincorporated community in Howard County, Arkansas, United States.

== 2011 tornado ==
On April 24, 2011, an EF1 tornado traveled from Umpire to Mineola parallel to Arkansas Highway 84, damaging a few structures. The tornado was on the back end of a period of heightened tornado activity that led directly into the 2011 Super Outbreak that began on April 25.
