= Hatfield School District =

Defunct school district in Arkansas, United States

The Hatfield School District or Hatfield Public Schools was a school district headquartered in Hatfield, Arkansas.

It operated Hatfield Elementary School and Hatfield High School.

On July 1, 2004, the district was consolidated into the Mena School District.
