= Acorn School District =

Defunct school district in Arkansas, United States

Acorn School District or Acorn Public Schools was a school district headquartered in Acorn, an unincorporated area in Polk County, Arkansas, United States, about 5 miles (8.0 km) from Mena. Schools included Acorn Elementary School and Acorn High School.

In addition to Acorn, it served a small section of Mena.

The Ouachita River School District was established by the merger of the Acorn School District and the Oden School District on July 1, 2004.
