= Van-Cove School District =

School district in Arkansas, United States

Van-Cove School District or Van-Cove Public Schools was a school district headquartered in Cove, Arkansas. It served Cove and Vandervoort.

It operated Van-Cove Elementary School in Vandevoort, and Van-Cove High School in Cove.

On July 1, 2010, that district consolidated with the Wickes School District into the Cossatot River School District.
