= Umpire High School =

Location
- 142 School Drive; Umpire, Howard, Arkansas 71971; United States; 34°16′39″N 94°3′7″W

Information
- School type: Public
- Status: Open
- School district: Umpire School District
- Superintendent: Dr. Mary Lowrey
- CEEB code: 042490
- NCES School ID: 050040500778
- Principal: Dr. Mary Lowrey
- Grades: 7–12
- Enrollment: 46 (2026-27)
  - Grade 7: 8
  - Grade 8: 9
  - Grade 9: 9
  - Grade 10: 2
  - Grade 11: 11
  - Grade 12: 7
- Student to teacher ratio: 5.79:1
- Education system: ADE Smart Core
- Classes offered: Regular, AP, Concurrent Credit
- Campus type: Rural
- Colors: Blue and white
- Athletics: Basketball (Boys/Girls), Track and Field, Cross Country
- Athletics conference: 1A Region 7 West
- Mascot: Wildcat
- Team name: Umpire Wildcats
- Accreditation: ADE
- Communities served: Umpire
- Feeder schools: Umpire Ełementary School
- Affiliation: Arkansas Activities Association
- Website: www.umpirewildcats.org

Umpire High School is a public high school located in Umpire, Arkansas, United States. The school provides secondary education in grades 7 through 12 serving rural, distant communities of Howard County, Arkansas. It is one of four public high schools in Howard County.

It was initially a part of the Umpire School District. On July 1, 2004, the former Umpire district was consolidated into the Wickes School District. On July 1, 2010, that district consolidated into the Cossatot River School District. Act 919 of 2025 allowed Umpire to return to its own independent school district, beginning in the 2026-27 academic year.

== Academics ==
The assumed course of study follows the Smart Core curriculum developed by the Arkansas Department of Education (ADE), which requires students complete at least 22 units prior to graduation. Students complete regular coursework and exams, and have access to AP (Advanced Placement) and dual-enrollment/concurrent credit college courses. Umpire High School is accredited by the ADE.

== Athletics ==
The Umpire High School mascot and athletic emblem is the Wildcat, with blue and white serving as the school colors.

The Umpire Wildcats compete in interscholastic activities within the 1A Classification, the state's smallest classification administered by the Arkansas Activities Association. The Wildcats play within the 1A Region 7 West Conference.

The Wildcats participate in basketball (boys/girls), track and field, and cross country.

== Organizations/Clubs ==
Umpire High School has an FCCLA, FFA, and Student Council. The school once again formed a trap shooting team in the 2025-26 academic year. As of the 2024-25 school year, Umpire High School formed a Jr. and Sr. Beta Club. In 2026-27, a drama club was formed.
