= Wickes School District =

Former school district in Arkansas

Wickes School District was a school district headquartered in Wickes, Arkansas.

It occupied territory in Polk, Sevier, and Howard County, Arkansas counties.

It served Wickes, Grannis, and Umpire.

At the end of its existence it had three schools: Wickes Elementary School, Wickes High School, and Umpire School.

On July 1, 2004, the Umpire School District consolidated into the Wickes School District. On July 1, 2010, that district consolidated with the Van Cove School District into the Cossatot River School District.
