= Grannis, Arkansas =

- City
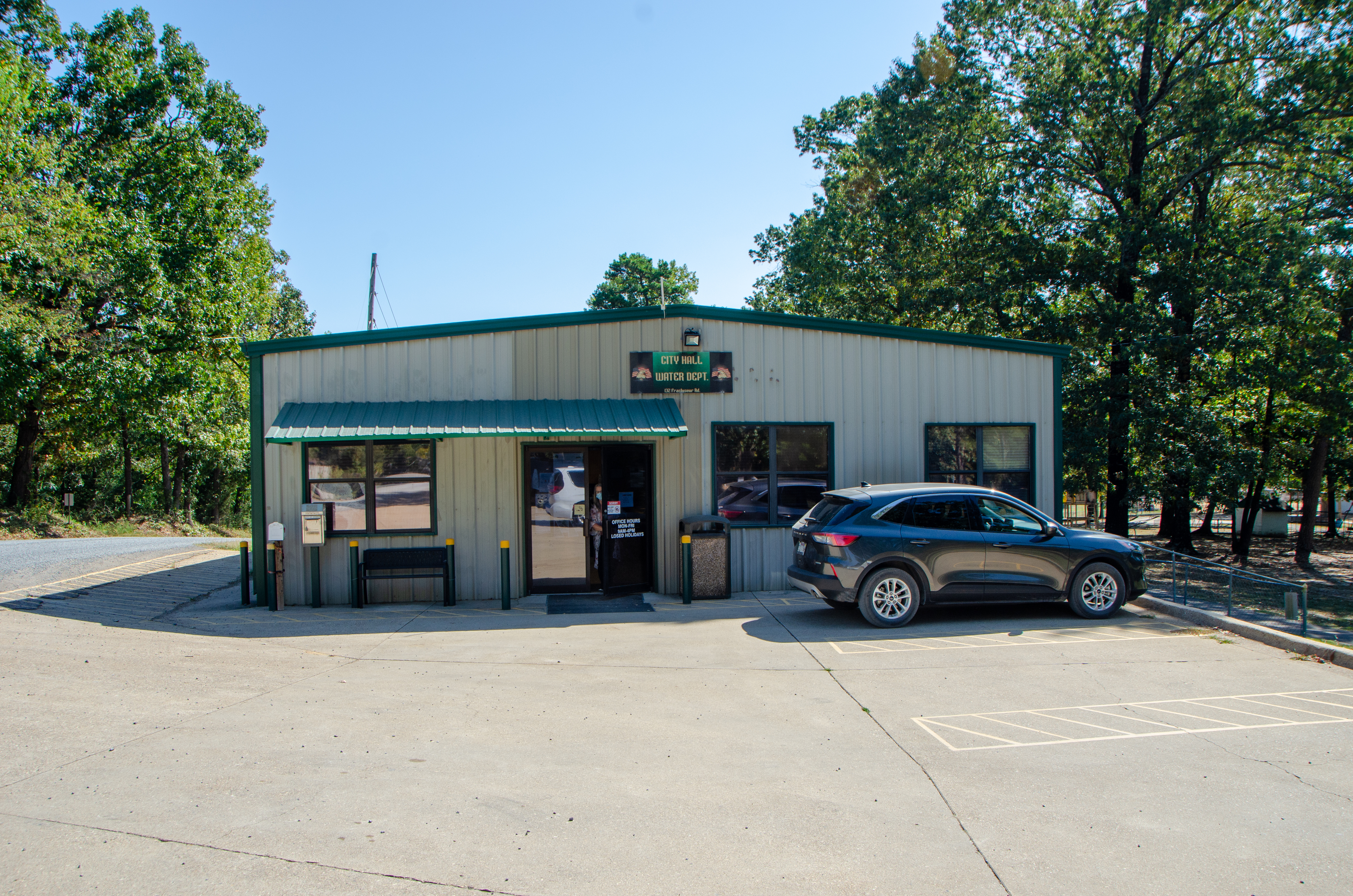
- City Hall

- Location of Grannis in Polk County, Arkansas.
- Coordinates: 34°14′20″N 94°19′42″W
- Country: United States
- State: Arkansas
- County: Polk

Area
  - Total: 7.98 sq mi (20.66 km^{2})
  - Land: 7.93 sq mi (20.54 km^{2})
  - Water: 0.046 sq mi (0.12 km^{2})
- Elevation: 912 ft (278 m)

Population (2020)
  - Total: 496
  - Estimate (2025): 498 ▲
  - Density: 62.5/sq mi (24.15/km^{2})
- Time zone: UTC-6 (Central (CST))
  - Summer (DST): UTC-5 (CDT)
- ZIP code: 71944
- Area code: 870
- FIPS code: 05-27970
- GNIS feature ID: 2403726
- Website: grannis.gov

Grannis is a city in Polk County, Arkansas, United States. As of the 2020 census, Grannis had a population of 496.

Near Grannis is the Boggs Springs Youth Encampment of the American Baptist Association, a retreat of Missionary Baptist churches.

== Geography ==
Grannis is located at 34°14′20″N 94°19′42″W (34.238884, -94.328404).

According to the United States Census Bureau, the city has a total area of 8.6 square miles (22 km^{2}), all land.

== Demographics ==
=== 2020 census ===
Grannis racial composition
Race	Number	Percentage
White (non-Hispanic)	292	58.87%
Native American	8	1.61%
Other/Mixed	28	5.65%
Hispanic or Latino	168	33.87%

As of the 2020 United States census, there were 496 people, 259 households, and 184 families residing in the city.

=== 2000 census ===
Historical population
Census	Pop.	Note	%±
1940	225		—
1950	193		−14.2%
1960	185		−4.1%
1970	177		−4.3%
1980	349		97.2%
1990	507		45.3%
2000	575		13.4%
2010	554		−3.7%
2020	496		−10.5%
2025 (est.)	498	▲	0.4%
U.S. Decennial Census

As of the census of 2000, there were 575 people, 210 households, and 164 families residing in the city. The population density was 66.6 inhabitants per square mile (25.7/km^{2}). There were 254 housing units at an average density of 29.4 per square mile (11.4/km^{2}). The racial makeup of the city was 78.78% White, 0.52% Black or African American, 4.35% Native American, 0.17% Pacific Islander, 14.09% from other races, and 2.09% from two or more races. 16.52% of the population were Hispanic or Latino of any race.

There were 210 households, out of which 37.6% had children under the age of 18 living with them, 68.1% were married couples living together, 7.6% had a female householder with no husband present, and 21.9% were non-families. 18.1% of all households were made up of individuals, and 4.8% had someone living alone who was 65 years of age or older. The average household size was 2.74 and the average family size was 3.10.

In the city, the population was spread out, with 26.6% under the age of 18, 11.5% from 18 to 24, 26.1% from 25 to 44, 24.2% from 45 to 64, and 11.7% who were 65 years of age or older. The median age was 32 years. For every 100 females, there were 101.0 males. For every 100 females age 18 and over, there were 103.9 males.

The median income for a household in the city was $29,083, and the median income for a family was $30,893. Males had a median income of $22,500 versus $17,000 for females. The per capita income for the city was $14,642. About 15.1% of families and 15.8% of the population were below the poverty line, including 22.7% of those under age 18 and 19.4% of those age 65 or over.

== Education ==
It is in the Cossatot River School District.

Grannis, in the 1950s, was assigned to Gillham(?) schools in Sevier County. At a later point it was in the Wickes School District, which consolidated into the Cossatot River district on July 1, 2010.
