= Wickes High School =

Location
- 110 South 5th Street; Wickes, Arkansas 71973; United States
- Coordinates: 34°16′39″N 94°3′7″W

Information
- School type: Public comprehensive
- Status: Closed
- School district: Wickes School District (-2010); Cossatot River School District (2010-2013)
- CEEB code: 042640
- NCES School ID: 050040501158
- Teaching staff: 19.08 (on FTE basis)
- Grades: 7–12
- Enrollment: 262 (2010–11)
  - Grade 7: 45
  - Grade 8: 47
  - Grade 9: 45
  - Grade 10: 40
  - Grade 11: 42
  - Grade 12: 39
- Student to teacher ratio: 13.73
- Education system: ADE Smart Core
- Classes offered: Regular, Advanced Placement (AP)
- Campus type: Rural
- Colors: Blue and white
- Athletics: Basketball, soccer, softball
- Athletics conference: 1A Region 7 West (2012–14)
- Mascot: Warrior
- Team name: Wickes Warriors
- Accreditation: ADE
- Affiliation: Arkansas Activities Association
- Federal funding: Title I

Wickes High School was a comprehensive public high school located in Wickes, Arkansas, United States. The school provided secondary education for students in grades 7 through 12 serving rural, distant communities of Polk County, Arkansas, primarily Wickes and Grannis. It was one of five public high schools in Polk County and one of three high schools administered by the Cossatot River School District.

Prior to July 1, 2010, Wickes High School was part of the former Wickes School District; on that date, the Wickes School District merged with the Van Cove School District to form the Cossatot River School District.

== Academics ==
The course of study follows the Smart Core curriculum developed by the Arkansas Department of Education (ADE), which requires students complete at least 22 units prior to graduation. Students complete coursework and exams and may take Advanced Placement (AP) courses and exam with the opportunity to receive college credit. Wickes High School is accredited by the ADE.

== Athletics ==
The Wickes High School mascot and athletic emblem is the Warrior with blue and white serving as the school colors.

The Wickes Warriors compete in interscholastic activities within the 1A Classification, the state's smallest classification administered by the Arkansas Activities Association. The Warriors play within the 1A Region 7 West Conference. The Warriors participate in golf (boys/girls), bowling (boys/girls), basketball (boys/girls), cheer, and track (boys/girls).
