= Mena, Arkansas =

- City
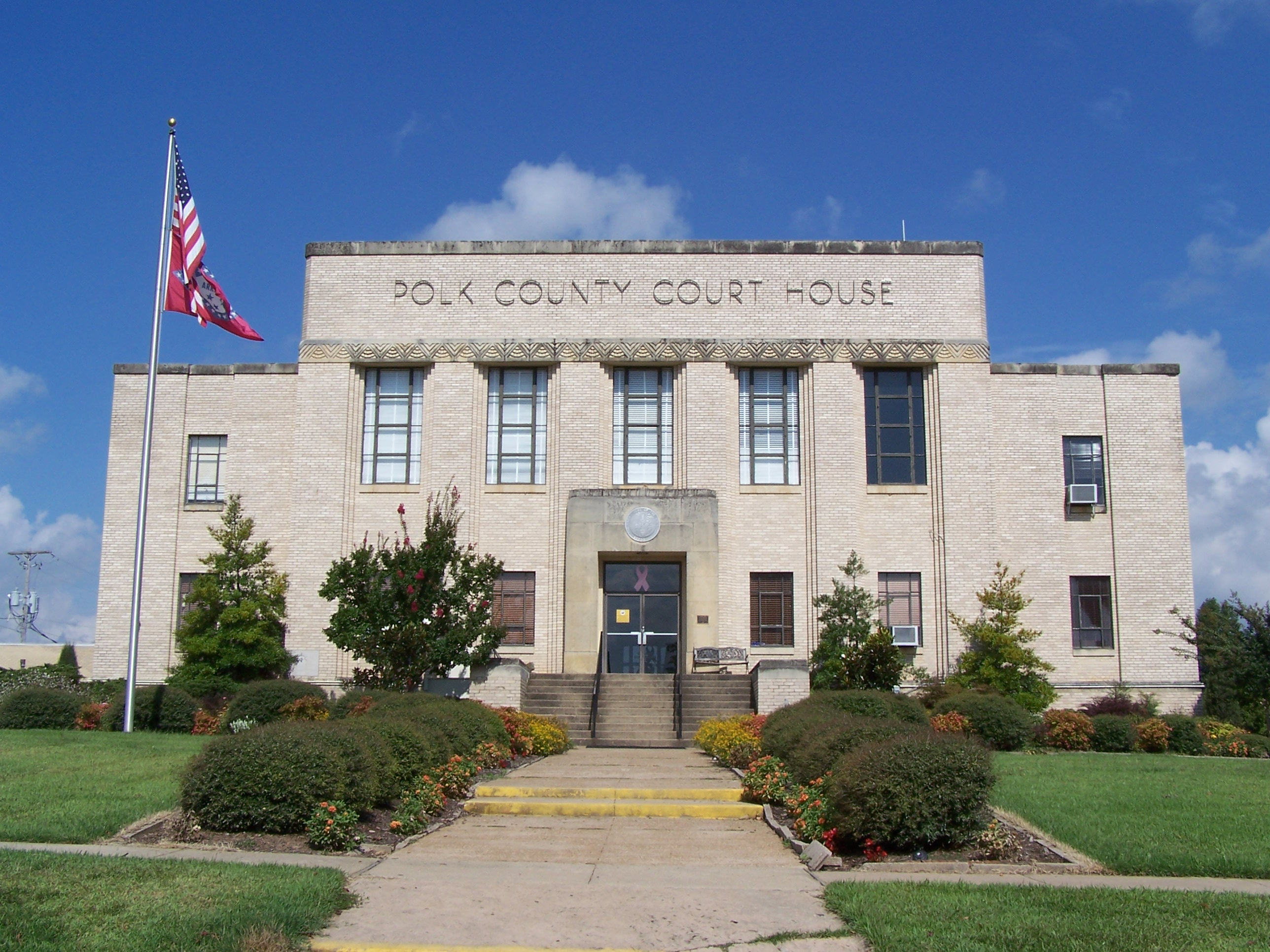
- Polk County Courthouse in Mena
- Motto: "Where good things happen!"
- Location of Mena in Polk County, Arkansas
- Coordinates: 34°35′10″N 94°14′23″W
- Country: United States
- State: Arkansas
- County: Polk

Government
  - Mayor: Seth Smith

Area
  - Total: 6.93 sq mi (17.96 km^{2})
  - Land: 6.89 sq mi (17.84 km^{2})
  - Water: 0.042 sq mi (0.11 km^{2})
- Elevation: 1,171 ft (357 m)

Population (2020)
  - Total: 5,589
  - Estimate (2025): 5,607 ▲
  - Density: 811.3/sq mi (313.26/km^{2})
- Time zone: UTC−06:00 (Central (CST))
  - Summer (DST): UTC−05:00 (CDT)
- ZIP Code: 71953
- Area code: 479
- FIPS code: 05-45170
- Website: City of Mena Arkansas

Mena (/ˈmiːnə/ MEE-nə) is a city in and the county seat of Polk County, Arkansas, United States. The population was 5,589 as of the 2020 census. Mena is located in the U.S. Interior Highlands. Surrounded by the Ouachita National Forest, Mena is a gateway to some of the most visited tourist attractions in Arkansas.

== History ==
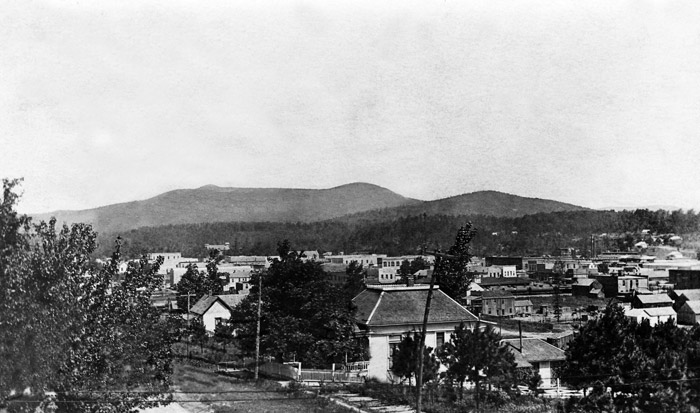
Mena, 1907

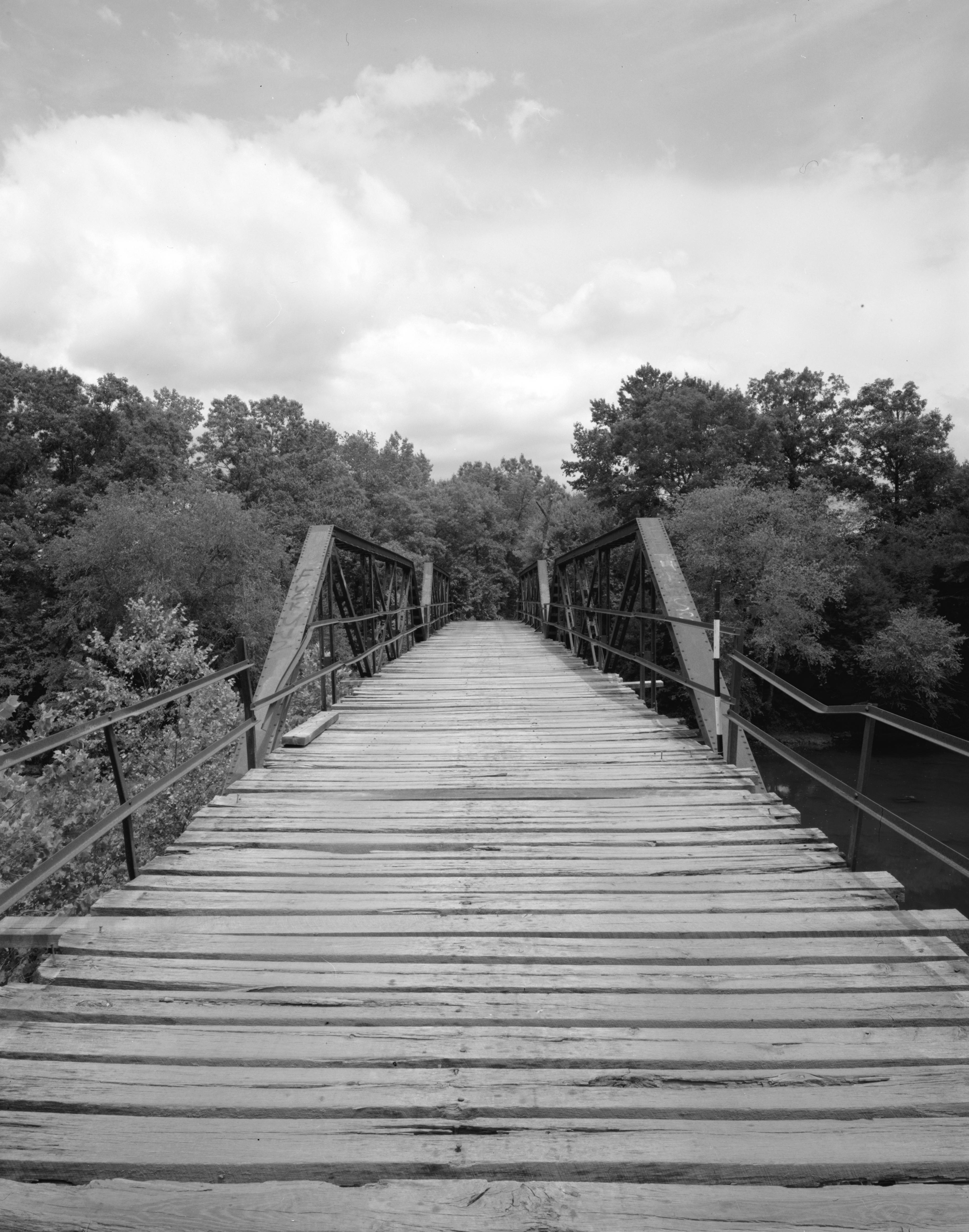
The Mountain Fork Bridge, eleven miles southwest of Mena, is listed on the National Register of Historic Places.

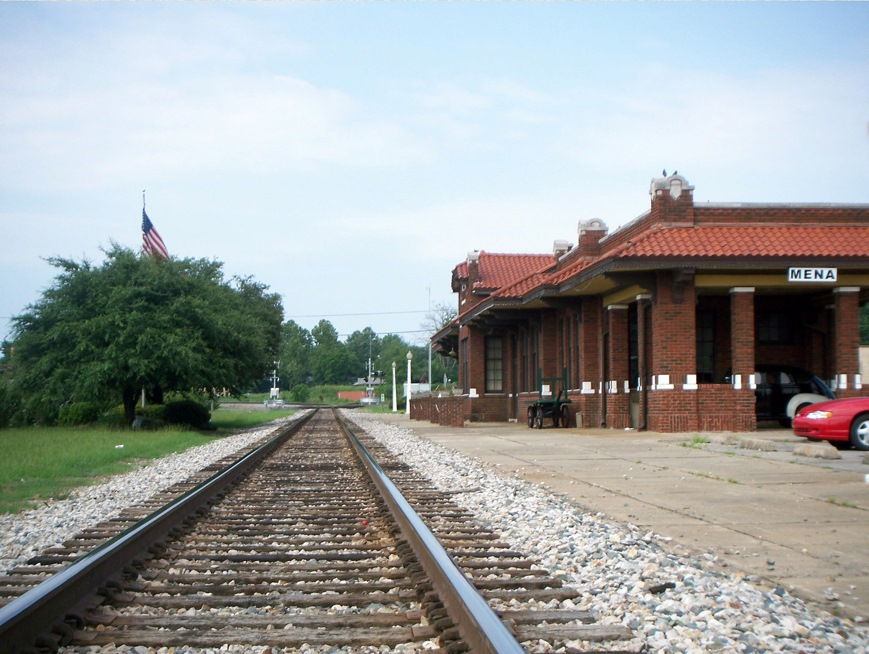
Depot in Mena

Mena was founded by Arthur Edward Stilwell during the building of the Kansas City, Pittsburg and Gulf Railroad (now the Kansas City Southern), which stretched from Kansas City, Missouri, to Port Arthur, Texas. Train service to Mena began in 1896.

Stilwell named the town in honor of Folmina Margaretha Janssen-De Goeijen, the wife of his friend and financier Jan De Goeijen, whom Mr. De Goeijen affectionately called Mena. Janssen Park in the center of Mena is also named for her.

Mena was settled in 1896 and incorporated on September 18 of that year. In 1897, the Bank of Mena was founded. The following year, the county seat was moved from nearby Dallas to Mena. Mena's population had grown to 3,423 by 1900. The main industries of the area were timber, agriculture and mineral extraction, though it was advertised as a spa city located within a healthy environment. Stilwell donated land to the city in 1906, and a park and campground were constructed. In 1910, the railroad moved its shop facilities from Mena to Heavener, Oklahoma. This created a loss of eight hundred jobs. A private school in Mena, Hendrix Academy, closed in 1905.

There were attempts to intimidate early Black settlers into leaving between 1896 and 1898. In 1901, an African-American man accused of kicking a White girl, was removed from the jail, beaten, and hanged. Local citizens posted a reward for the murderers; there were no arrests. In the mid-1920s, the town advertised that it had no Negroes. In the early 1900s, the Black population declined, and Mena became known as a sundown town. In 1920, the Mena Star advertised the city as 100 percent White.

In 1911, a damaging tornado struck the town.

=== Recent history ===
In the 1950s, a government program to stockpile manganese led to the reopening of local mines closed since the 1890s. The program ended in 1959, and the mines again closed.

During the 1980s, drug smuggler Barry Seal moved his operations to the Mena Intermountain Municipal Airport, where he owned and operated many planes and helicopters, as well as advanced radar equipment. Seal also flew gun and drug smuggling missions between Mena and Nicaragua as part of a CIA scheme to support the Contras. Local law enforcement claimed that attempts to investigate the operation were blocked by the White House.

On April 9, 2009, a large and violent tornado devastated the town, killing three and injuring thirty. Many homes and businesses were damaged or destroyed. The Arkansas National Guard was deployed to the affected area. The tornado was rated as a high-end EF3, with winds near 165 mph (266 km/h), and damages estimated at $25 million.

Mena is the eastern end of the Talimena Scenic Drive, a route that extends to Talihina, Oklahoma.

== Geography ==
According to the United States Census Bureau, the city has a total area of 6.8 square miles (18 km^{2}), of which 6.7 square miles (17 km^{2}) is land, and 0.04 square miles (0.10 km^{2}) (0.44%) is water.

=== Climate ===
Mena's climate is characterized by hot, humid summers and generally mild to cool winters, with precipitation occurring in all seasons. The Köppen Climate Classification subtype for this climate is "Cfa" (Humid Subtropical Climate).

Climate data for Mena, Arkansas (1991–2020 normals, extremes 1891–present)
| Month | Jan | Feb | Mar | Apr | May | Jun | Jul | Aug | Sep | Oct | Nov | Dec | Year |
|---|---|---|---|---|---|---|---|---|---|---|---|---|---|
| Record high °F (°C) | 82 (28) | 84 (29) | 90 (32) | 92 (33) | 99 (37) | 105 (41) | 110 (43) | 112 (44) | 107 (42) | 100 (38) | 85 (29) | 80 (27) | 112 (44) |
| Mean daily maximum °F (°C) | 49.4 (9.7) | 54.0 (12.2) | 61.9 (16.6) | 70.4 (21.3) | 77.3 (25.2) | 85.0 (29.4) | 89.7 (32.1) | 89.7 (32.1) | 83.2 (28.4) | 72.6 (22.6) | 60.8 (16.0) | 51.7 (10.9) | 70.5 (21.4) |
| Daily mean °F (°C) | 38.6 (3.7) | 42.4 (5.8) | 50.0 (10.0) | 58.3 (14.6) | 66.7 (19.3) | 74.8 (23.8) | 78.7 (25.9) | 78.0 (25.6) | 71.3 (21.8) | 60.4 (15.8) | 49.3 (9.6) | 41.1 (5.1) | 59.1 (15.1) |
| Mean daily minimum °F (°C) | 27.7 (−2.4) | 30.9 (−0.6) | 38.2 (3.4) | 46.2 (7.9) | 56.1 (13.4) | 64.5 (18.1) | 67.8 (19.9) | 66.3 (19.1) | 59.3 (15.2) | 48.1 (8.9) | 37.9 (3.3) | 30.4 (−0.9) | 47.8 (8.8) |
| Record low °F (°C) | −10 (−23) | −15 (−26) | 6 (−14) | 21 (−6) | 31 (−1) | 44 (7) | 48 (9) | 47 (8) | 34 (1) | 20 (−7) | 13 (−11) | −7 (−22) | −15 (−26) |
| Average precipitation inches (mm) | 3.99 (101) | 4.08 (104) | 5.51 (140) | 6.20 (157) | 7.22 (183) | 4.48 (114) | 4.96 (126) | 4.05 (103) | 4.71 (120) | 5.29 (134) | 5.58 (142) | 5.36 (136) | 61.43 (1,560) |
| Average snowfall inches (cm) | 0.8 (2.0) | 1.8 (4.6) | 0.8 (2.0) | 0.0 (0.0) | 0.0 (0.0) | 0.0 (0.0) | 0.0 (0.0) | 0.0 (0.0) | 0.0 (0.0) | 0.0 (0.0) | 0.0 (0.0) | 0.6 (1.5) | 4.0 (10) |
| Average precipitation days (≥ 0.01 in) | 10.2 | 10.1 | 11.0 | 10.1 | 11.3 | 9.8 | 9.8 | 8.4 | 8.2 | 8.8 | 9.5 | 10.1 | 117.3 |
| Average snowy days (≥ 0.1 in) | 0.6 | 0.7 | 0.3 | 0.0 | 0.0 | 0.0 | 0.0 | 0.0 | 0.0 | 0.0 | 0.0 | 0.5 | 2.1 |
Source: NOAA

== Demographics ==
Historical population
| Census | Pop. | Note | %± |
|---|---|---|---|
| 1900 | 3,423 | | — |
| 1910 | 3,953 | | 15.5% |
| 1920 | 3,441 | | −13.0% |
| 1930 | 3,118 | | −9.4% |
| 1940 | 3,510 | | 12.6% |
| 1950 | 4,445 | | 26.6% |
| 1960 | 4,388 | | −1.3% |
| 1970 | 4,530 | | 3.2% |
| 1980 | 5,154 | | 13.8% |
| 1990 | 5,475 | | 6.2% |
| 2000 | 5,637 | | 3.0% |
| 2010 | 5,737 | | 1.8% |
| 2020 | 5,589 | | −2.6% |
| 2025 (est.) | 5,607 | ▲ | 0.3% |
U.S. Decennial Census

=== 2020 census ===
As of the 2020 census, Mena had a population of 5,589. The median age was 41.2 years. 23.7% of residents were under the age of 18 and 23.8% were 65 years of age or older. For every 100 females, there were 89.9 males, and for every 100 females age 18 and over, there were 86.9 males age 18 and over.

96.4% of residents lived in urban areas, while 3.6% lived in rural areas.

There were 2,372 households in Mena, including 1,420 families, and 27.0% had children under the age of 18 living in them. Of all households, 41.3% were married-couple households, 20.0% were households with a male householder and no spouse or partner present, and 32.6% were households with a female householder and no spouse or partner present. About 35.9% of all households were made up of individuals, and 19.2% had someone living alone who was 65 years of age or older.

There were 2,793 housing units, of which 15.1% were vacant. The homeowner vacancy rate was 4.7%, and the rental vacancy rate was 12.0%.

Mena racial composition
| Race | Number | Percentage |
|---|---|---|
| White (non-Hispanic) | 4,692 | 83.95% |
| Black or African American (non-Hispanic) | 14 | 0.25% |
| Native American | 95 | 1.7% |
| Asian | 62 | 1.11% |
| Pacific Islander | 4 | 0.07% |
| Other/mixed | 423 | 7.57% |
| Hispanic or Latino | 299 | 5.35% |

=== 2000 census ===
As of the census of 2000, there were 5,637 people, 2,431 households, and 1,546 families residing in the city. The population density was 836.4 inhabitants per square mile (322.9/km^{2}). There were 2,771 housing units at an average density of 411.2 units per square mile (158.8 units/km^{2}). The racial makeup of the city was 96.91% White, 0.20% Black or African American, 0.87% Native American, 0.27% Asian, 0.05% Pacific Islander, 0.50% from other races, and 1.21% from two or more races. About 2.18% of the population were Hispanic or Latino of any race.

There were 2,431 households, out of which 27.5% had children under the age of 18 living with them, 49.7% were married couples living together, 10.9% had a female householder with no husband present, and 36.4% were non-families. Of all households 33.7% were made up of individuals, and 18.9% had someone living alone who was 65 years of age or older. The average household size was 2.24, and the average family size was 2.85.

In the city, the population was spread out, with 23.1% under the age of 18, 7.7% from 18 to 24, 23.8% from 25 to 44, 20.9% from 45 to 64, and 24.5% who were 65 years of age or older. The median age was 41 years. For every 100 females, there were 84.1 males. For every 100 females, age 18 and over, there were 79.9 males.

The median income for a household in the city was $22,671, and the median income for a family was $30,164. Males had a median income of $23,665 versus $18,472 for females. The per capita income for the city was $14,710. About 12.1% of families and 17.6% of the population were below the poverty line, including 22.8% of those under age 18 and 16.8% of those age 65 or over.

== Culture ==
A portion of American Made is set in Mena, Arkansas. The film focuses on the exploits of Barry Seal, a drug runner for the Medellín Cartel who operated out of Mena Intermountain Municipal Airport.

== Infrastructure ==
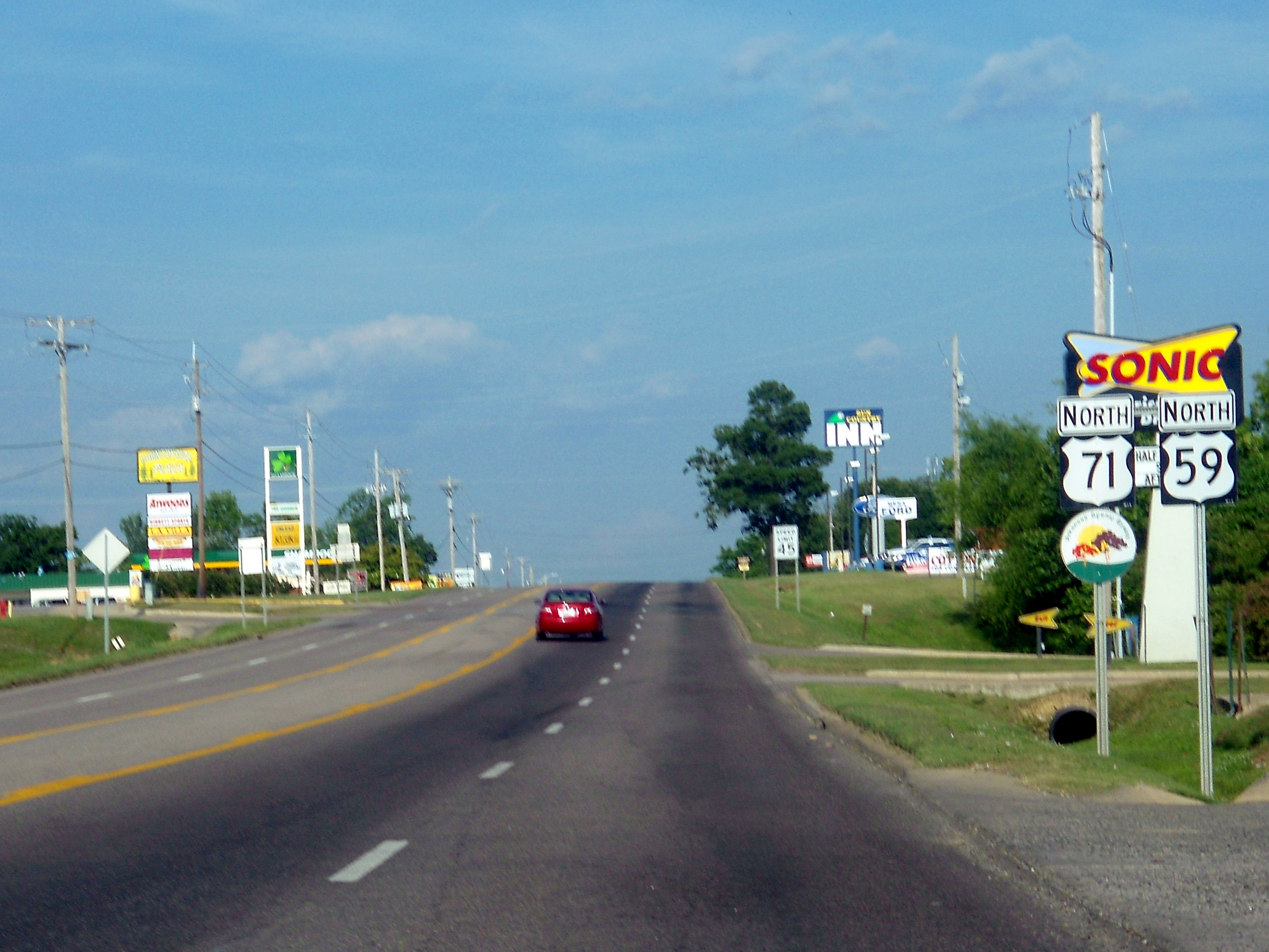
Highway in Mena

=== Transportation ===
The city is served by Mena Intermountain Municipal Airport. Intercity bus service is provided by Jefferson Lines. Mena is served by US 71 and US 59. They are both concurrent throughout Mena. Interstate 49 is planned to bypass Mena on the eastside.

=== Utilities ===
- Rich Mountain Electric Cooperative is a non-profit rural electric utility cooperative headquartered in Mena.
- Within the city limits, electricity is provided by the Southwestern Electric Power Company (SWEPCO).

=== Health care ===
- The city is served by Mena Regional Health System.

== Education ==
=== Elementary and secondary education ===
Public education for elementary and secondary school students is available from two school districts:

- Mena School District, which includes Mena High School
- Ouachita River School District, which includes Acorn High School in Acorn; it was recognized as a 2012 U.S. Department of Education Green Ribbon School.
  - Previously that section of Mena was in the Acorn School District. The Ouachita River School District was established by the merger of the Acorn School District and the Oden School District on July 1, 2004.

=== Post-secondary education ===
- Commonwealth College was once located at the base of Rich Mountain and was known for its ties to socialism, as well as for being the one-time college of Orval Faubus, former governor of Arkansas.
- Rich Mountain Community College is located in Mena. In 2015, RMCC was accepted into the University of Arkansas network. The two-year post-secondary institution is now known as UA Rich Mountain.

== Media ==
The local newspaper is the weekly The Mena Star. The Southwest Times Record, based in Fort Smith, is also sold in Mena and covers both the news of the state and the Arkansas River Valley. A statewide daily, the Arkansas Democrat-Gazette, based in Little Rock, is distributed there too.

The big four television stations in Mena are KFSM (CBS), KHBS (ABC), KNWA (NBC) and KFTA (Fox). KARK (NBC, Little Rock) is also available on cable, dating from the times when KNWA's signal did not reach Mena. KNWA is available over-the-air via a digital sub-channel and on satellite.

KXI97 (sometimes referred to as "Mena All Hazards") is a NOAA Weather Radio station that serves Mena.

Mena now has a tabloid circular, The Polk County Pulse, owned by KENA Radio. This is distributed free of charge in Mena, coming out each Wednesday.

A monthly historical journal is also published in Mena, Looking Glass Ouachita Magazine. The monthly is distributed digitally as well as via special editions at local gift shops and restaurants.

== Notable people ==
- Nate Bell, former member of Arkansas House of Representatives
- Edwin L. Cox, businessman and philanthropist
- Norris "Tuffy" Goff, comedian and radio actor, played Abner Peabody in the Lum and Abner radio and television programs (born in Cove, Arkansas, raised in Mena)
- Chester Lauck, half of the Lum and Abner comedy pair; played Columbus "Lum" Edwards
- Herbert A. Littleton, Medal of Honor recipient for his actions during the Korean War
- Dennis L. Montgomery, software designer who sold millions of dollars of useless software to the US government
- Marcus Richmond, Republican member of the Arkansas House of Representatives for District 21 in multi-county region; born in Mena in 1956
- Barry Seal, pilot, businessman and drug smuggler
- Dorothy Shaver, first female president of a major Fifth Avenue store
- Mike Simpson, NFL player
- Olin E. Teague, longtime Texas's 6th congressional district representative; born in Oklahoma, but reared in Mena
- T. Texas Tyler, country singer ("The Deck of Cards")

== See also ==
- List of sundown towns in the United States
