= Oden School District =

Defunct school district in Arkansas, United States

Oden School District or Oden Public Schools was a school district headquartered in Oden, Arkansas, United States.

Its schools included Oden Elementary School and Oden High School.

The Ouachita River School District was established by the merger of the Acorn School District and the Oden School District on July 1, 2004.
