= Polk County, Arkansas =

County in Arkansas, United States

- County
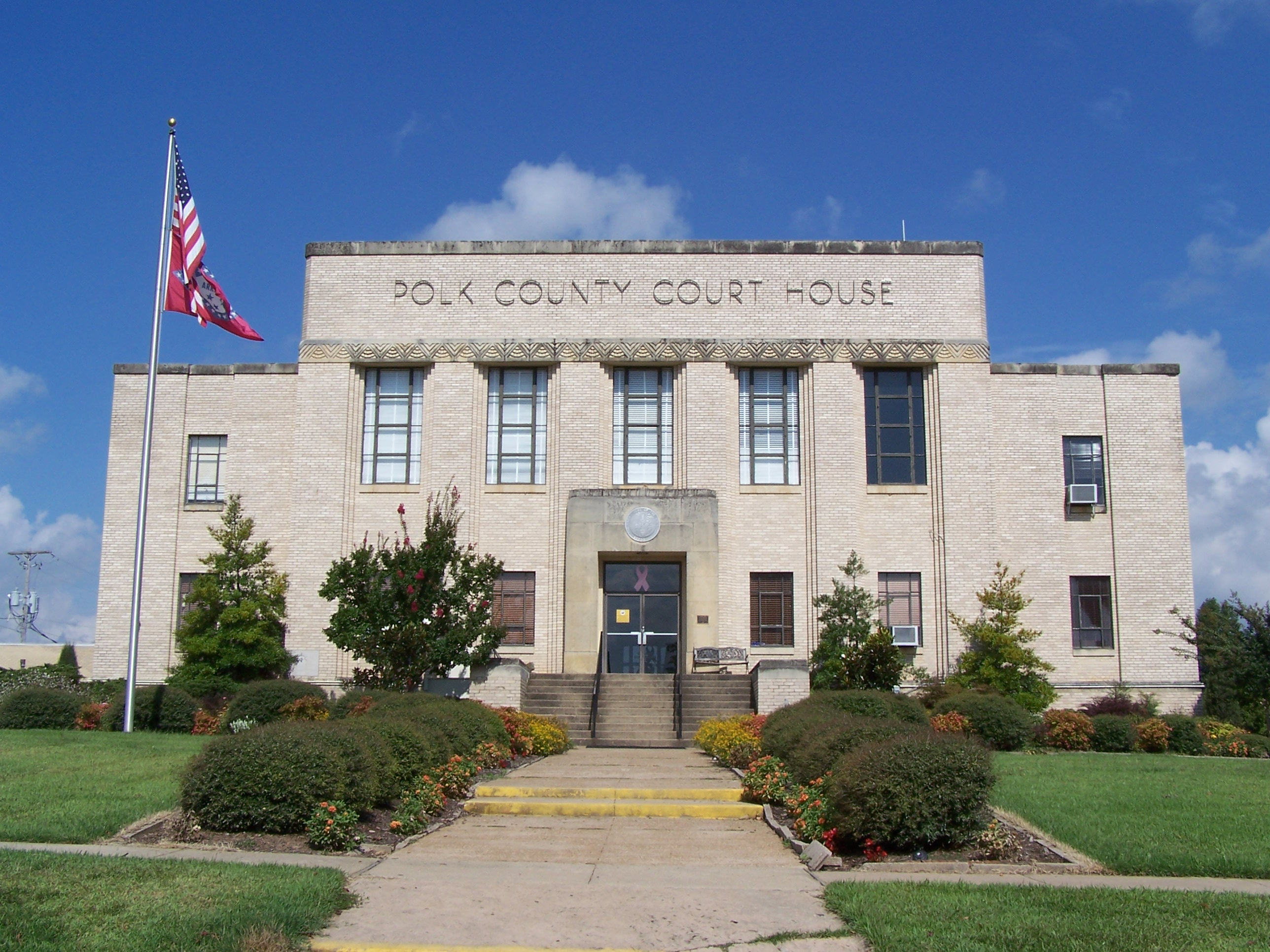
- Polk County Courthouse in Mena

- Location within the U.S. state of Arkansas
- Coordinates: 34°30′07″N 94°14′27″W
- Country: United States
- State: Arkansas
- Founded: November 30, 1844
- Named for: James K. Polk
- Seat: Mena
- Largest city: Mena

Area
  - Total: 862 sq mi (2,230 km^{2})
  - Land: 858 sq mi (2,220 km^{2})
  - Water: 4.8 sq mi (12 km^{2}) 0.6%

Population (2020)
  - Total: 19,221
  - Estimate (2025): 19,486 ▲
  - Density: 22.4/sq mi (8.65/km^{2})
- Time zone: UTC−6 (Central)
  - Summer (DST): UTC−5 (CDT)
- Congressional district: 4th

Polk County is a county located in the U.S. state of Arkansas. As of the 2020 census, the population was 19,221. The county seat is Mena. Polk County is Arkansas's 48th county, formed on November 30, 1844; it was named for James K. Polk, 11th President of the United States.

== Wet county ==
Pol County was formerly under an alcohol prohibition as a dry county. However, following a historic mid-term election in 2022, Polk County is now a wet county.

== Geography ==
According to the U.S. Census Bureau, the county has a total area of 862 square miles (2,230 km^{2}), of which 858 square miles (2,220 km^{2}) is land and 4.8 square miles (12 km^{2}) (0.6%) is water.

=== Major highways ===
- Future Interstate 49
- U.S. Highway 59
- U.S. Highway 71
- U.S. Highway 270
- U.S. Highway 278
- Highway 4
- Highway 8
- Highway 84
- Highway 88
- Highway 246
- Highway 272
- Highway 370
- Highway 375
- Highway 980

=== Transit ===
- Jefferson Lines

=== Adjacent counties ===
- Scott County (north)
- Montgomery County (east)
- Pike County (southeast)
- Howard County (southeast)
- Sevier County (south)
- McCurtain County, Oklahoma (southwest)
- Le Flore County, Oklahoma (northwest)

=== National protected area ===
- Ouachita National Forest (part)

== Demographics ==
Historical population
Census	Pop.	Note	%±
1850	1,263		—
1860	4,262		237.5%
1870	3,376		−20.8%
1880	5,857		73.5%
1890	9,283		58.5%
1900	18,352		97.7%
1910	17,216		−6.2%
1920	16,412		−4.7%
1930	14,857		−9.5%
1940	15,832		6.6%
1950	14,182		−10.4%
1960	11,981		−15.5%
1970	13,297		11.0%
1980	17,007		27.9%
1990	17,347		2.0%
2000	20,229		16.6%
2010	20,662		2.1%
2020	19,221		−7.0%
2025 (est.)	19,486	▲	1.4%
U.S. Decennial Census; 1790–1960 1900–1990; 1990–2000 2010

=== 2020 census ===
As of the 2020 census, the county had a population of 19,221. The median age was 45.2 years. 22.4% of residents were under the age of 18 and 23.4% of residents were 65 years of age or older. For every 100 females there were 96.3 males, and for every 100 females age 18 and over there were 95.3 males age 18 and over.

The racial makeup of the county was 85.5% White, 0.2% Black or African American, 1.9% American Indian and Alaska Native, 0.5% Asian, <0.1% Native Hawaiian and Pacific Islander, 3.2% from some other race, and 8.6% from two or more races. Hispanic or Latino residents of any race comprised 6.6% of the population.

28.8% of residents lived in urban areas, while 71.2% lived in rural areas.

There were 7,992 households in the county, of which 27.0% had children under the age of 18 living in them. Of all households, 50.0% were married-couple households, 19.1% were households with a male householder and no spouse or partner present, and 25.9% were households with a female householder and no spouse or partner present. About 29.6% of all households were made up of individuals and 15.9% had someone living alone who was 65 years of age or older.

There were 9,612 housing units, of which 16.9% were vacant. Among occupied housing units, 77.0% were owner-occupied and 23.0% were renter-occupied. The homeowner vacancy rate was 2.8% and the rental vacancy rate was 12.7%.

=== 2000 census ===
As of the 2000 census, there were 20,229 people, 8,047 households, and 5,793 families residing in the county. The population density was 24 people per square mile (9.3 people/km^{2}). There were 9,236 housing units at an average density of 11 per square mile (4.2/km^{2}). The racial makeup of the county was 94.69% White, 0.16% Black or African American, 1.49% Native American, 0.21% Asian, 0.06% Pacific Islander, 1.72% from other races, and 1.67% from two or more races. 3.50% of the population were Hispanic or Latino of any race.

There were 8,047 households, out of which 31.90% had children under the age of 18 living with them, 60.40% were married couples living together, 8.40% had a female householder with no husband present, and 28.00% were non-families. 25.00% of all households were made up of individuals, and 12.30% had someone living alone who was 65 years of age or older. The average household size was 2.49 and the average family size was 2.97.

In the county, the population was spread out, with 25.60% under the age of 18, 7.90% from 18 to 24, 25.00% from 25 to 44, 24.50% from 45 to 64, and 17.00% who were 65 years of age or older. The median age was 39 years. For every 100 females there were 97.00 males. For every 100 females age 18 and over, there were 94.00 males.

The median income for a household in the county was $25,180, and the median income for a family was $31,379. Males had a median income of $23,397 versus $17,294 for females. The per capita income for the county was $14,063. 18.20% of the population and 14.00% of families were below the poverty line. Out of the total people living in poverty, 23.50% were under the age of 18 and 16.20% were 65 or older.

As of 2010 Polk County had a population of 20,662. Of this population 89.77% were non-Hispanic whites, 0.31% were blacks, 1.76% Native Americans, 0.45% Asians, 2.03% non-Hispanics reporting one or more race and 5.76% Hispanic or Latino.

== Government ==
=== Government ===
The county government is a constitutional body granted specific powers by the Constitution of Arkansas and the Arkansas Code. The quorum court is the legislative branch of the county government and controls all spending and revenue collection. Representatives are called justices of the peace and are elected from county districts every even-numbered year. The number of districts in a county vary from nine to fifteen, and district boundaries are drawn by the county election commission. The Polk County Quorum Court has nine members. Presiding over quorum court meetings is the county judge, who serves as the chief operating officer of the county. The county judge is elected at-large and does not vote in quorum court business, although capable of vetoing quorum court decisions.

Polk County, Arkansas elected countywide officials
Position	Officeholder	Party
County Judge	Brandon Ellison	Republican
County Clerk	Lisa Standridge	Republican
Circuit Clerk	Michelle Heath Schnell	Republican
Sheriff/Collector	Scott Sawyer	Republican
Treasurer	Tanya Fretz	Republican
Assessor	Jovan Thomas	Independent
Coroner	Brian Bowser	Republican

The composition of the Quorum Court following the 2024 elections is 7 Republicans and 2 Independents. Justices of the Peace (members) of the Quorum Court following the elections are:

- District 1: Chris Daniel (I)
- District 2: Jeremy Jones (R)
- District 3: Levi Ellison (R)
- District 4: James P. Looney (R)
- District 5: Troy Lunsford (R)
- District 6: Tommy Floyd (R)
- District 7: Tawana L. Gilbert (R)
- District 8: Terry Scott (I)
- District 9: Mitchell Ray Tidwell (R)

Additionally, the townships of Polk County are entitled to elect their own respective constables, as set forth by the Constitution of Arkansas. Constables are largely of historical significance as they were used to keep the peace in rural areas when travel was more difficult. The township constables as of the 2024 elections are:

- Gap Springs: John Deming (R)
- Mountain: Donald D. Davis (R)
- Potter: Eddie Price (R)

=== Politics ===
Since 1952, Polk County has been heavily Republican, only voting for the Democratic nominee for president three times since then. It last voted for the Democratic nominee for president in 1992, when it gave Arkansas governor Bill Clinton 43.8 percent of the vote. After this, the county trended rapidly towards Republicans, with the Republican margin of victory increasing in every subsequent election. In 2020, the county gave Republican presidential nominee Donald Trump 82.9 percent of the vote, the highest ever vote share for a Republican presidential candidate in the county, and Democratic nominee Joe Biden 14.7 percent of the vote, the lowest ever vote share for a Democratic presidential candidate in the county.

United States presidential election results for Polk County, Arkansas
Year	Republican		Democratic		Third party(ies)	
Year	No.	%	No.	%	No.	%
1896	51	4.78%	1,004	94.10%	12	1.12%
1900	411	29.63%	922	66.47%	54	3.89%
1904	476	40.44%	528	44.86%	173	14.70%
1908	628	37.88%	824	49.70%	206	12.42%
1912	162	11.08%	694	47.47%	606	41.45%
1916	448	26.51%	1,242	73.49%	0	0.00%
1920	1,173	46.27%	1,208	47.65%	154	6.07%
1924	502	31.49%	863	54.14%	229	14.37%
1928	1,022	53.34%	870	45.41%	24	1.25%
1932	223	11.90%	1,568	83.67%	83	4.43%
1936	537	30.95%	1,170	67.44%	28	1.61%
1940	585	31.49%	1,255	67.55%	18	0.97%
1944	764	43.09%	999	56.35%	10	0.56%
1948	554	25.89%	1,417	66.21%	169	7.90%
1952	1,756	55.91%	1,379	43.90%	6	0.19%
1956	1,832	58.29%	1,287	40.95%	24	0.76%
1960	1,882	51.82%	1,635	45.02%	115	3.17%
1964	2,022	43.88%	2,575	55.88%	11	0.24%
1968	2,094	40.30%	1,290	24.83%	1,812	34.87%
1972	3,609	74.83%	1,120	23.22%	94	1.95%
1976	2,432	40.76%	3,505	58.75%	29	0.49%
1980	3,993	58.51%	2,617	38.35%	214	3.14%
1984	5,181	70.15%	2,101	28.45%	104	1.41%
1988	4,099	62.15%	2,390	36.24%	106	1.61%
1992	2,757	38.20%	3,162	43.81%	1,298	17.99%
1996	2,852	42.70%	2,824	42.28%	1,003	15.02%
2000	4,600	63.95%	2,315	32.18%	278	3.86%
2004	5,192	66.57%	2,473	31.71%	134	1.72%
2008	5,473	71.25%	1,957	25.48%	251	3.27%
2012	5,955	77.08%	1,556	20.14%	215	2.78%
2016	6,618	80.40%	1,212	14.72%	401	4.87%
2020	7,035	82.86%	1,246	14.68%	209	2.46%
2024	6,987	84.30%	1,145	13.82%	156	1.88%

== Popular culture ==
Polk County is the setting for Stephen Hunter's fictional Bob Lee Swagger series, the most notable being Black Light, as well as the place where Joel B Reed's fictional character, Jazz Phillips, of the Jazz Phillips mystery series, grew up.

== Communities ==
=== Cities ===
- Mena (county seat)
- Wickes

=== Towns ===
- Cove
- Grannis
- Hatfield
- Vandervoort

=== Census-designated places ===
- Acorn
- Board Camp

=== Other unincorporated communities ===
- Ink

=== Townships ===
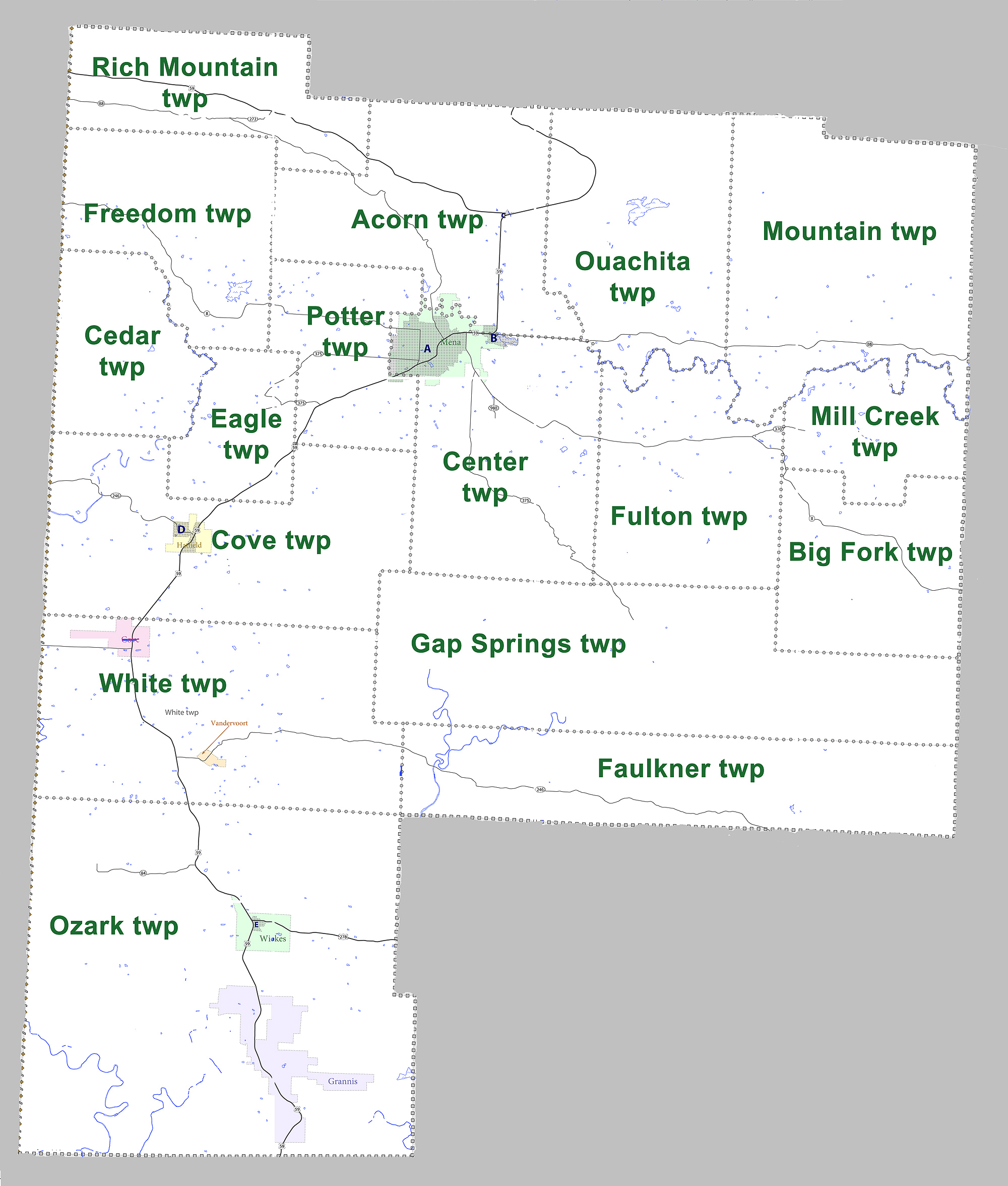
Townships in Polk County, Arkansas as of 2010

Townships in Arkansas are the divisions of a county. Each township includes unincorporated areas; some may have incorporated cities or towns within part of their boundaries. Arkansas townships have limited purposes in modern times. However, the United States census does list Arkansas population based on townships (sometimes referred to as "county subdivisions" or "minor civil divisions"). Townships are also of value for historical purposes in terms of genealogical research. Each town or city is within one or more townships in an Arkansas county based on census maps and publications. The townships of Polk County are listed below; listed in parentheses are the cities, towns, and/or census-designated places that are fully or partially inside the township.

- Acorn (small part of Mena)
- Big Fork
- Cedar
- Center (most of Mena)
- Cove (Hatfield)
- Eagle
- Faulkner
- Freedom
- Fulton
- Gap Springs
- Mill Creek
- Mountain
- Ouachita
- Ozark (Grannis, Wickes)
- Potter (small part of Mena)
- Rich Mountain
- White (Cove, Vandervoort)

== See also ==
- List of lakes in Polk County, Arkansas
- National Register of Historic Places listings in Polk County, Arkansas
- Osro Cobb
