= List of United States tornadoes in April 2009 =

This is a list of all tornadoes that were confirmed by local offices of the National Weather Service in the United States in April 2009.

== United States yearly total ==
Confirmed tornadoes by Enhanced Fujita rating
EFU	EF0	EF1	EF2	EF3	EF4	EF5	Total
0	695	348	82	20	2	0	1159

== April ==
Confirmed tornadoes by Enhanced Fujita rating
EFU	EF0	EF1	EF2	EF3	EF4	EF5	Total
0	114	80	20	9	1	0	226

Note: 2 tornadoes were confirmed in the final totals, but do not have a listed rating.

=== April 1 event ===
List of reported tornadoes - Wednesday, April 1, 2009
EF#	Location	County	Coord.	Time (UTC)	Path length	Damage
Florida
EF0	ESE of Snow Hill	Seminole	28.68°N 81.05°W	2022	unknown	Brief tornado spotted with no damage.
Sources: NCDC Storm Data

=== April 2 event ===
List of reported tornadoes - Thursday, April 2, 2009
EF#	Location	County/Parish	Coord.	Time (UTC)	Path length	Damage
Louisiana
EF0	Watson	Livingston	30.56°N 90.95°W	1713	unknown	Brief tornado snapped a few trees.
Mississippi
EF0	E of McComb	Pike	31.28°N 90.33°W	1740	unknown	Brief tornado with no damage.
EF0	ENE of Pearlington	Hancock	30.25°N 89.59°W	1850	1.5 miles (2.4 km)	Several trees were snapped, but no structures were impacted.
EF0	SSW of Bay St. Louis	Hancock	30.30°N 89.33°W	1905	unknown	Brief tornado reported along the beachfront.
EF0	Ocean Springs	Jackson	30.42°N 88.82°W	1945	0.5 miles (0.80 km)	Minor damage to 14 homes, including 2 roofs lifted off.
EF0	WNW of Houston	Chickasaw	33.94°N 89.09°W	2342	0.6 miles (0.97 km)	Intermittent tornado damaged some trees and power lines.
EF1	WNW of Amory	Monroe	34.03°N 88.61°W	0023	3 miles (4.8 km)	A house lost parts of its roof and many trees and power lines were knocked down.
Alabama
EF0	Hightogy area	Lamar	33.69°N 88.09°W	2015	0.1 miles (0.16 km)	Brief touchdown with no known damage.
EF1	NW of Samantha	Tuscaloosa	33.44°N 87.64°W	2043	0.6 miles (0.97 km)	Damage limited to hardwood and softwood trees being snapped and/or uprooted.
EF1	S of Leighton	Colbert	34.62°N 87.53°W	2046	0.3 miles (0.48 km)	Damage to the roof of one church and to numerous trees.
EF0	SW of Tanner	Limestone	34.70°N 86.98°W	2135	1.8 miles (2.9 km)	Damage to three homes, a barn and a metal shed. Numerous trees were snapped.
EF1	Lacey's Spring area	Morgan	34.53°N 86.60°W	2226	1.2 miles (1.9 km)	Mostly minor damage to several residences including manufactured homes although some homes sustained heavier damage due to fallen trees. A shed was destroyed.
EF0	W of Huntsville	Madison	34.73°N 86.62°W	0109	0.7 miles (1.1 km)	Damage limited to trees though one of the fallen trees landed on top of a home.
Tennessee
EF1	East Nashville	Davidson	36.17°N 86.78°W	2100	2 miles (3.2 km)	Tornado touched down near Nashville International Airport at the corner of Briley Parkway and Murfreesboro Pike, roughly following Elm Hill Pike. Several businesses were damaged - some of them heavily. Minor damage to homes and numerous trees were downed. One person was injured.
Florida
EF0	SW of River Junction	Gadsden	30.62°N 84.90°W	2225	unknown	Small tornado reported along Interstate 10 with no damage.
Sources: SPC Storm Reports for 04/02/09, NWS Huntsville, NWS Nashville, NWS New Orleans, NWS Birmingham, NCDC Storm Data

=== April 5 event ===
List of reported tornadoes - Sunday, April 5, 2009
EF#	Location	County	Coord.	Time (UTC)	Path length	Damage
Kentucky
EF1	E of Liberty	Casey		0120	0.25 miles (0.40 km)	One house lost its roof and two barns were destroyed
Sources: NWS Louisville

=== April 6 event ===
List of reported tornadoes - Monday, April 6, 2009
EF#	Location	County	Coord.	Time (UTC)	Path length	Damage
North Carolina
EF2	SE of Clarkton	Bladen	34.44°N 78.59°W	1440	1.5 miles (2.4 km)	Damage to four houses including one that was shifted from its foundation and large shed was destroyed. Significant tree damage in the area.
EF0	SSE of Sunbury	Gates	36.44°N 76.61°W	1535	0.25 miles (0.40 km)	Brief tornado touchdown with damage limited to tree tops.
EF1	W of Longwood	Brunswick	34.00°N 78.56°W	1545	2.2 miles (3.5 km)	Minor damage to two houses. Dozens of trees were heavily damaged.
Sources: NWS Wilmington, NC, NWS Wilmington, NC (LSR), NWS Wakefield (LSR), WVEC, NCDC Storm Data

=== April 8 event ===
List of reported tornadoes - Wednesday, April 8, 2009
EF#	Location	County	Coord.	Time (UTC)	Path length	Damage
Idaho
EF0	SW of Burley	Cassia	42.50°N 113.82°W	1900	unknown	Tornado was on the ground for 5 minutes with no damage.
Sources: NCDC Storm Data

=== April 9 event ===
List of reported tornadoes – Thursday, April 9, 2009
EF#	Location	County/Parish	Coord.	Time (UTC)	Path length	Damage
Oklahoma
EF0	E of Vinita	Craig	36.64°N 95.08°W	2303	2.4 miles (3.9 km)	Roofs were torn off several homes and a barn. Damage to two power poles.
EF0	SE of Wilburton	Latimer	34.82°N 95.30°W	2318	4.3 miles (6.9 km)	Several houses and a gas compressor station were damaged.
EF1	ENE of Nashoba	Pushmataha	34.50°N 95.12°W	2342	7.7 miles (12.4 km)	Many trees were damaged, including snapped trunks.
EF1	N of Wister	Le Flore	35.00°N 94.82°W	2355	7.5 miles (12.1 km)	Several homes were damaged and several barns were destroyed.
EF2	E of Big Cedar	Le Flore, Polk (AR)	34.62°N 94.57°W	0026	9.2 miles (14.8 km)	Several mobile homes and a permanent home were heavily damaged or destroyed. Four people were injured, one of whom sustained broken bones.
EF3	Eagletown to Dierks, AR	McCurtain, Sevier (AR), Howard (AR), Pike (AR)	34.01°N 94.48°W	0101	29 miles (47 km)	Long-track tornado with significant damage, particularly in De Queen, Arkansas. At least 10 mobile homes were destroyed, with seven people injured in the park. An Army Corps of Engineers office and another reinforced concrete building were also heavily damaged in the Dierks Lake area. Howard and Sevier Counties were later declared a disaster area.
Texas
EF1	NW of Hughes Springs	Morris, Cass	33.07°N 94.66°W	0052	6 miles (9.7 km)	Damage to trees and power lines along the path.
EF2	NW of Linden	Cass	33.05°N 94.49°W	0105	16 miles (26 km)	Many trees were knocked down, crushing houses and vehicles. A two-story house was severely damaged, and a portable building was blown away.
EF0	NE of Bivins	Cass	33.05°N 94.12°W	0141	2.4 miles (3.9 km)	Numerous trees were knocked down along its path.
EF1	NW of Hallsville	Harrison	32.61°N 94.64°W	0213	3.1 miles (5.0 km)	Several houses damaged by falling trees and windows blown out. A large shed was ripped from its foundation.
EF2	Waskom to Bossier City, LA	Harrison, Caddo (LA), Bossier (LA)	32.54°N 94.14°W	0248	38.5 miles (62.0 km)	Continuous long-track tornado with many houses and businesses damaged along its path, some of which were nearly destroyed. Tornado tracked near Cross Lake and eventually into downtown Shreveport (with little damage there) before crossing the Red River into Bossier City. Damage was also reported at Barksdale Air Force Base. Two people were injured and overall damage was about $14 million.
Arkansas
EF3	SW of Mena to NE of Ink	Polk	34.58°N 94.54°W	0102–0117	14.84 miles (23.88 km)	3 deaths – See section on this tornado – 30 people were injured.
EF2	Center Point area	Howard	34.01°N 93.96°W	0134	2.5 miles (4.0 km)	Rare large anticyclonic tornado severely damaged a house and a barn. One person was injured.
EF3	N of Kiblah	Miller	33.06°N 93.99°W	0151	10 miles (16 km)	An outbuilding and a mobile home were destroyed, throwing debris half a mile (800 m) away. Major tree damage along its path.
EF1	SE of Newhope	Pike	34.20°N 93.84°W	0153	3 miles (4.8 km)	Many trees were knocked down on private timber company land.
EF2	S of Crossett	Ashley	33.10°N 91.97°W	0427	14 miles (23 km)	15 houses, including some mobile homes, were heavily damaged or destroyed and 27 others were damaged to lesser degrees. Many trees were also damaged or knocked over.
Missouri
EF0	Nixa area	Christian	37.06°N 93.32°W	0120	1.6 miles (2.6 km)	Minor damage to more than a dozen homes with additional damage to trees and fences. Several power lines were also downed by the tornado along Route 160.
Louisiana
EF0	NNE of Bolinger	Bossier	32.98°N 93.68°W	0302	0.75 miles (1.21 km)	Several trees were snapped in a heavily forested area.
EF0	NE of Heflin	Webster	32.47°N 93.27°W	0404	2.25 miles (3.62 km)	Several trees were snapped or uprooted.
EF1	NE of Litroe	Union	33.00°N 92.17°W	0421	5 miles (8.0 km)	Tornado damaged trees in the Upper Ouachita Wildlife Refuge.
EF1	S of Simsboro	Lincoln	32.48°N 92.81°W	0433	4.4 miles (7.1 km)	Many trees were snapped and a house sustained minor roof damage.
EF2	NE of Eros	Jackson, Ouachita	32.42°N 92.37°W	0505	11.7 miles (18.8 km)	Several houses were damaged, one of them heavily with its roof torn off. Many trees were damaged, with some falling onto structures.
EF1	Delhi area	Richland, Madison	32.44°N 91.53°W	0627	4.5 miles (7.2 km)	Tornado roughly paralleled Interstate 20 with some trees down and minor damage to a few houses.
Sources: SPC Storm Reports for April 9, 2009, NWS Little Rock, NWS Tulsa, NWS Springfield, NWS Jackson, NWS Shreveport, NCDC Storm Data

=== April 10 event ===
List of reported tornadoes – Friday, April 10, 2009
EF#	Location	County/Parish	Coord.	Time (UTC)	Path length	Damage
Alabama
EF0	Martling area	Marshall	34.38°N 86.17°W	1038	1.9 miles (3.1 km)	Early-morning weak tornado produced minor roof damage to a few homes, heavily damaged two sheds and peeled the roof off a barn.
EF0	SSW of Thach	Limestone	34.88°N 86.91°W	1859	unknown	Brief tornado with up to 20 trees were snapped at mile marker 359 on Interstate 65.
EF3	E of Grant	Marshall, Jackson, DeKalb	34.53°N 86.20°W	2002	33 miles (53 km)	Long track tornado with many houses heavily damaged in the area along Lake Guntersville and in subdivisions to the east, with a few destroyed. Many mobile homes and boat houses were also destroyed along its path. Five people were injured.
EF1	SW of Roxana	Tallapoosa, Lee	32.65°N 85.85°W	0012	18 miles (29 km)	Numerous barns and outbuildings were heavily damaged. Many trees were also knocked down.
EF1	Loachapoka area	Lee	32.60°N 85.59°W	0030	6 miles (9.7 km)	A church sustained moderate roof damage and many outbuildings, a few vehicles and hundreds of trees were damaged.
EF1	S of Beauregard	Lee	32.52°N 85.38°W	0051	2.25 miles (3.62 km)	Damage to several structures including a mobile home and roof damage to buildings.
EF1	Crawford area	Russell	32.46°N 85.27°W	0104	6 miles (9.7 km)	Damage limited to uprooted trees.
EF1	Phenix City	Russell	32.42°N 85.09°W	0119	1 mile (1.6 km)	Tornado touched down at the Phenix City dragstrip. The most severe damage was at a mobile home park, where two people were injured.
EF1	Notasulga area	Tallapoosa, Macon, Lee	32.58°N 85.76°W	0126	25.3 miles (40.7 km)	Several houses sustained minor damage and mobile homes sustained significant damage. Thousands of trees were snapped or uprooted.
EF1	Montgomery area	Montgomery, Macon, Bullock	32.33°N 86.21°W	0148	26.1 miles (42.0 km)	Tornado tracked across the eastern side of the Montgomery metropolitan area and continued eastward. Dozens of houses were damaged, and at least three barns and numerous outbuildings were destroyed. Thousands of trees were damaged.
EF1	Seale area	Russell	32.31°N 85.11°W	0220	0.5 miles (0.80 km)	One mobile home was destroyed injuring its occupant. Several trees were also blown down.
Tennessee
EF1	NE of Camden	Benton	36.13°N 88.03°W	1541	4.5 miles (7.2 km)	12 homes and two mobile homes suffered roof damage while several outbuildings were destroyed.
EF0	NW of Waverly	Humphreys	36.17°N 87.92°W	1550	1 mile (1.6 km)	Brief tornado touchdown in the Highlands on Kentucky Lake subdivision snapped a few trees.
EF1	N of Waverly	Humphreys, Houston	36.20°N 87.80°W	1559	12 miles (19 km)	Five houses were damaged and a mobile home and two barns were destroyed. Extensive tree damage.
EF4	N of Eagleville to NE of Murfreesboro	Rutherford	35.85°N 86.41°W	1719–1755	23.25 miles (37.42 km)	2 deaths – See article section on this tornado – 58 people were injured
EF1	SSW of Portland	Sumner	36.52°N 86.55°W	1749	0.6 miles (0.97 km)	Tornado touched down near the Johnston Crossroads community. Four houses and a mobile home lost their roofs and trees were damaged.
EF0	SE of Rucker	Rutherford	35.73°N 86.37°W	1758	0.2 miles (0.32 km)	A house was damaged from a blown tree along a short path.
EF1	Pleasant View	Rutherford	35.76°N 86.26°W	1801	3.7 miles (6.0 km)	Four houses and a barn were damaged and trees were uprooted.
EF0	W of Woodbury	Cannon	35.82°N 86.12°W	1819	0.8 miles (1.3 km)	Minimal damage, mostly to trees.
EF0	W of Hillsboro	Coffee	35.42°N 86.00°W	1918	0.25 miles (0.40 km)	Brief tornado videotaped by a storm chaser along Interstate 24 with no damage.
EF1	S of Monterey	Putnam, Cumberland	36.05°N 85.32°W	1922	12 miles (19 km)	Many trees were twisted, snapped or uprooted. Several farm buildings and many fences were also damaged.
EF2	S of Dunlap	Sequatchie	35.31°N 85.46°W	2002	5 miles (8.0 km)	Several houses and a school sustained minor to moderate damage. Severe tree damage with trunks snapped.
EF1	E of Dunlap	Sequatchie	35.36°N 85.35°W	2005	0.2 miles (0.32 km)	Brief tornado damaged a house and several trees.
EF1	ENE of Sale Creek	Hamilton	35.38°N 85.11°W	2023	0.5 miles (0.80 km)	One house was damaged and many trees were knocked down.
Kentucky
EF0	W of Almo	Calloway	36.68°N 83.43°W	1616	0.25 miles (0.40 km)	Tornado embedded in a microburst. Several houses sustained minor damage and trees damaged.
EF1	NE of Eddyville	Lyon	37.10°N 83.03°W	1645	0.33 miles (0.53 km)	A mobile home was overturned by a short-lived tornado, injuring one person. A commercial building was also damaged.
EF0	NW of Crofton	Christian	37.03°N 87.51°W	1647	1.5 miles (2.4 km)	Tornado confirmed by emergency management. Minor damage to several buildings on a farm.
EF3	Mannington area	Christian, Hopkins	37.12°N 87.49°W	1654	2 miles (3.2 km)	Tornado touched down in the community with 2 houses destroyed according to WEHT-TV. Two people inside a destroyed house were injured—one severely.
EF0	W of Eubank	Pulaski	37.27°N 84.63°W	1856	unknown	Brief tornado with debris visible but no damage.
EF1	NE of Eubank	Pulaski, Lincoln	37.28°N 84.65°W	1917	6.5 miles (10.5 km)	Several barns, a metal shed and two mobile homes were destroyed. Several other structures including homes were damaged. One conventional home was pushed off 10 feet (3.0 m) from its foundation.
Georgia
EF2	Summerville	Chattooga	34.28°N 84.65°W	2100	0.9 miles (1.4 km)	Over 30 homes and 10 businesses were damaged, with a lumber warehouse and car care center taking the most damage. One mobile home was destroyed.
EF1	NE of Jasper	Pickens	34.47°N 84.45°W	2204	3.5 miles (5.6 km)	Damage limited to trees, utility poles and power lines.
EF2	NNE of Carnesville	Franklin	34.42°N 83.27°W	2253	4.5 miles (7.2 km)	Several houses and mobile homes were heavily damaged. A chicken house was flattened and others were damaged.
EF1	SE of Dunn	Forsyth	34.20°N 84.07°W	2257	0.5 miles (0.80 km)	Brief tornado/waterspout on the shores of Lake Lanier damaged at least 100 trees – some falling on a house – and destroyed at least three boats and two boat docks.
EF1	SE of Ochille	Chattahoochee	32.35°N 84.97°W	0146	4 miles (6.4 km)	Several outbuildings and sheds were destroyed. Hundreds of trees were also damaged.
EF0	NNE of Boneville	McDuffie	33.45°N 82.43°W	0153	unknown	Brief tornado with trees down, some on vehicles.
EF1	NE of Cussetta	Chattahoochee	32.30°N 84.78°W	0200	4 miles (6.4 km)	Minor damage to two homes, one church and several sheds. A metal storage building was destroyed.
EF0	NW of Sparta	Hancock	33.30°N 83.00°W	0219	1.5 miles (2.4 km)	Damage to one mobile home.
EF0	N of Sparta	Hancock	33.29°N 82.98°W	0223	1.1 miles (1.8 km)	Damage limited to trees.
EF3	NE of Sparta	Hancock	33.28°N 82.96°W	0228	6.5 miles (10.5 km)	Two homes and a mobile home were destroyed with damage to two other homes. Numerous trees were flattened. One person was injured and a Shetland pony was killed.
EF3	Grovetown to Augusta	Columbia, Richmond	33.45°N 82.20°W	0230	18 miles (29 km)	Large wedge tornado with significant damage along a swath roughly paralleling U.S. Route 278 in the Augusta area, including to many houses, businesses and mobile homes. 12 people were injured at a nursing home which was hit and over 150 had to be evacuated.
EF0	SE of Gibson	Glascock	33.28°N 82.96°W	0256	0.6 miles (0.97 km)	A few pine trees were damaged.
EF1	NW of Seville	Sumter, Dooly, Wilcox	32.10°N 84.02°W	0300	25 miles (40 km)	Two houses sustained significant roof damage along a long track. Severe damage was also reported to several mobile homes, a radio tower and over 1,000 trees.
EF0	N of Vienna	Dooly	32.10°N 83.79°W	0320	6 miles (9.7 km)	One house sustained roof damage, a chicken house was destroyed and a tin roof was peeled from a barn.
EF3	St. Clair area	Burke	33.12°N 82.03°W	0334	26 miles (42 km)	Long track tornado with numerous houses and a church heavily damaged. A grocery store was also destroyed, as were many trees. Four people were injured, one seriously.
EF1	NE of Plains	Sumter	33.12°N 82.03°W	0340	1 mile (1.6 km)	Spotty light damage mostly to trees.
EF1	S of David	Glascock, Jefferson	33.25°N 82.50°W	0402	4 miles (6.4 km)	A church and its cemetery were heavily damaged. Many trees were knocked down.
EF1	Cobb area	Sumter, Crisp, Wilcox	31.96°N 83.99°W	0415	33 miles (53 km)	About 70 houses were damaged, some of them heavily. Heavy damage to trees and power lines.
EF0	NE of Keysville	Burke	33.25°N 82.13°W	0434	2 miles (3.2 km)	Many trees were knocked down.
South Carolina
EF0	W of Long Creek	Oconee	34.76°N 81.27°W	2230	unknown	Brief tornado with no damage.
EF1	S of Townville	Anderson	34.49°N 81.88°W	2323	3 miles (4.8 km)	Several houses were damaged due to fallen trees along Lake Hartwell, and a trailer was thrown off its blocks.
EF0	NW of Campbell	Anderson	34.49°N 81.88°W	2350	2 miles (3.2 km)	A few trees were snapped or uprooted.
EF1	NW of Watts	Abbeville	34.16°N 82.51°W	0023	2 miles (3.2 km)	Two houses were damaged, one of them by fallen trees.
EF2	Abbeville area	Abbeville	34.18°N 82.47°W	0028	7 miles (11 km)	A half-dozen homes lost their entire roof, numerous trailers were destroyed and other buildings were heavily damaged. Two people were injured.
EF1	S of Jonesville	Union	34.81°N 81.86°W	0032	4 miles (6.4 km)	At least four mobile homes were damaged with some debris landing in trees. A textile plant was also damaged.
EF1	Greenwood area	Greenwood	34.19°N 82.15°W	0041	5 miles (8.0 km)	A few houses were damaged, one of which lost its roof. Extensive and severe tree damage along the intermittent path.
EF1	N of Greenwood	Greenwood	34.21°N 82.14°W	0043	3 miles (4.8 km)	Several houses were damaged, one of which lost its roof. A train derailed after a tree fell on the track.
EF3	Beech Island area	Aiken	33.40°N 81.85°W	0257	15 miles (24 km)	Many houses and businesses were severely damaged or destroyed. 14 people were injured and one indirect death occurred due to an auto accident.
EF1	N of Averill	Allendale	33.10°N 81.48°W	0426	1.2 miles (1.9 km)	Extensive tree damage along its path but no structural damage.
EF2	NE of Martin	Allendale	33.10°N 81.48°W	0430	1.2 miles (1.9 km)	A mobile home was heavily damaged and several other houses were damaged. Extensive tree damage.
EF0	NW of Millett	Barnwell	33.15°N 81.67°W	0521	unknown	Brief tornado damaged a few trees along the Savannah River.
Sources: SPC Storm Reports for April 10, 2009, NWS Nashville, NWS Paducah, NWS Huntsville, NWS Morristown, NWS Birmingham, NWS Louisville, NWS Jackson, KY, NWS Peachtree City, NWS Charleston, SC, NWS Greenville, SC, NCDC Storm Data

=== April 11 event ===
List of reported tornadoes - Saturday, April 11, 2009
EF#	Location	County	Coord.	Time (UTC)	Path length	Damage
North Carolina
EF0	E of Washington	Beaufort	35.59°N 76.95°W	0640	400 yards (370 m)	Minor damage to several houses, one of which had roof damage. Numerous trees were knocked down.
Texas
EF0	SE of Spraberry	Glasscock	31.87°N 101.76°W	0055	0.75 miles (1.21 km)	Damage to an area of mesquite trees as well as a snapped power pole.
Sources: SPC Storm Reports for April 10, 2009, SPC Storm Reports for April 11, 2009, NWS Midland, TX, NCDC Storm Data

=== April 12 event ===
List of reported tornadoes - Sunday, April 12, 2009
EF#	Location	County	Coord.	Time (UTC)	Path length	Damage
Texas
EF0	N of Montague	Montague	33.72°N 97.72°W	0013	unknown	Brief tornado with minimal damage.
Sources: NCDC Storm Data

=== April 13 event ===
List of reported tornadoes - Monday, April 13, 2009
EF#	Location	County	Coord.	Time (UTC)	Path length	Damage
Alabama
EF0	WNW of Black	Geneva	31.00°N 85.75°W	1300	unknown	Several houses were damaged along its short path.
Georgia
EF1	Fitzgerald area	Ben Hill	31.71°N 83.25°W	1640	3 miles (4.8 km)	Several buildings were damaged, with one losing its brick facade, and many trees were also damaged. Originally determined to be due to a microburst but photographic evidence determined it was a tornado.
EF0	SW of Baxley	Appling	31.70°N 82.73°W	1840	5 miles (8.0 km)	Narrow tornado track with a house porch damaged.
EF1	SE of Townsend	McIntosh	31.51°N 81.49°W	2040	8 miles (13 km)	Minor structural damage to a church. Extensive damage to trees.
Tennessee
EF0	Manchester area	Coffee	35.52°N 85.92°W	0145	0.5 miles (0.80 km)	Roof damage to a one home and numerous trees twisted, snapped or uprooted.
Florida
EF0	SW of Crescent Beach	St. Johns	28.17°N 82.71°W	0210	unknown	Brief tornado blew part of a roof off a house and damaged a fence.
Sources: SPC Storm Reports for April 13, 2009, NWS Jacksonville, NWS Nashville (PIS), NWS Charleston, SC, NWS Tallahassee, NCDC Storm Data

=== April 14 event ===
List of reported tornadoes - Tuesday, April 14, 2009
EF#	Location	County	Coord.	Time (UTC)	Path length	Damage
Florida
EF1	Trinity area	Pinellas, Pasco	28.17°N 82.71°W	1228	2.3 miles (3.7 km)	A barn was destroyed, a green house was missing, one business had roof damage and a destroyed awning and 50 homes had light to moderate damage. Damage to fences and trees.
EF0	Wesley Chapel	Pasco	28.28°N 82.31°W	1300	0.25 miles (0.40 km)	6 homes were damaged mostly to roofs, roof decking, siding and fences. A pool cage was destroyed, trees were downed and an SUV was flipped.
EF0	Port St. John	Brevard	28.48°N 80.79°W	1501	0.2 miles (0.32 km)	Brief tornado embedded in straight-line wind damage. A flea market was damaged.
Sources: SPC Storm Reports for April 14, 2009, NWS Tampa Bay, NWS Melbourne, NCDC Storm Data

=== April 16 event ===
List of reported tornadoes - Thursday, April 16, 2009
EF#	Location	County	Coord.	Time (UTC)	Path length	Damage
Texas
EF0	N of Kress	Swisher	34.40°N 101.75°W	2044	1 mile (1.6 km)	Tornado sighted in open fields near Interstate 27 with no damage.
EF0	N of Acuff	Lubbock	33.65°N 101.60°W	2202	2 miles (3.2 km)	Tornado remained in open country with no damage.
EF0	E of Idalou	Lubbock	33.66°N 101.59°W	2203	2 miles (3.2 km)	Second tornado in a supercell with minor damage to a business.
EF0	SW of Ralls	Crosby	33.65°N 101.40°W	2345	1 mile (1.6 km)	Tornado appeared as a large dusty spin-up with no damage.
EF0	W of Justiceburg	Garza	33.02°N 101.22°W	0020	1 mile (1.6 km)	A house lost a few shingles.
EF0	W of Clairemont	Kent	33.16°N 101.01°W	0115	1 mile (1.6 km)	Brief tornado over open ranchland with no damage.
EF1	W of County Line	Lubbock, Hale	33.75°N 102.07°W	0156	8 miles (13 km)	Several mobile homes sustained roof damage and several outbuildings were destroyed. Damage also reported to power poles.
EF1	S of Knott	Martin	32.26°N 102.01°W	0220	8 miles (13 km)	Damage to power poles and a shed.
EF0	Vincent	Howard	32.48°N 101.23°W	0225	unknown	
EF1	NW of County Line	Hale	33.83°N 101.99°W	0226	2 miles (3.2 km)	Tornado knocked down power poles and a small tower.
EF0	NW of Clairemont	Kent	33.25°N 100.90°W	0238	unknown	Tumble weeds and other vegetation were thrown around.
EF2	W of Fairview	Howard	32.36°N 101.52°W	0253	11 miles (18 km)	Damage to a large tank, a radio tower, a storage shed and numerous power poles and power distribution towers including some sheared off their base.
EF1	S of Ackerly	Martin	32.26°N 102.01°W	0255	7 miles (11 km)	A large shed was destroyed and a house sustained minor roof damage.
EF0	W of Girard	Kent	33.35°N 100.73°W	0305	2 miles (3.2 km)	Tornado remained in mesquite-covered range land with no damage.
EF1	W of Acuff	Lubbock	33.59°N 101.64°W	0314	2 miles (3.2 km)	A poorly constructed barn was destroyed and a business sustained minor damage.
EF0	E of Gilpin	Dickens	33.40°N 100.55°W	0335	unknown	Brief tornado remained in open rangeland with no damage.
EF0	SW of Guthrie	King	33.48°N 100.50°W	0352	unknown	Brief tornado with a few power flashes sighted.
Sources: SPC Storm Reports for April 16, 2009, NWS Lubbock, NWS Midland/Odessa, NCDC Storm Data

=== April 17 event ===
List of reported tornadoes - Friday, April 17, 2009
EF#	Location	County	Coord.	Time (UTC)	Path length	Damage
Colorado
EF0	W of Karval	Lincoln	38.67°N 104.03°W	2149	unknown	Brief tornado spotted with no damage.
Sources: NCDC Storm Data

=== April 18 event ===
List of reported tornadoes - Saturday, April 18, 2009
EF#	Location	County/Parish	Coord.	Time (UTC)	Path length	Damage
Texas
EF0	NE of Easterly	Robertson	31.12°N 96.37°W	1430	unknown	Brief tornado tore down trees, fences and power lines.
EF0	SW of Highland Bayou	Galveston	31.12°N 96.37°W	2100	1 mile (1.6 km)	Several houses were damaged and an observing platform was destroyed.
Kansas
EF0	N of Cimarron (1st tornado)	Gray	37.88°N 100.35°W	1757	1 mile (1.6 km)	Brief spin-up landspout tornado.
EF0	N of Cimarron (2nd tornado)	Gray	37.95°N 100.34°W	1829	1 mile (1.6 km)	Tornado remained in a plowed field with no damage.
EF0	SW of Kalvesta	Finney	38.01°N 100.26°W	1902	2 miles (3.2 km)	Intermittent tornado remained in open country.
EF2	SE of Kalvesta	Finney, Hodgeman	38.04°N 100.27°W	1910	4 miles (6.4 km)	A farm was heavily damaged by a multiple-vortex tornado.
EF0	N of Kalvesta	Finney	38.08°N 100.24°W	1925	1 mile (1.6 km)	Tornado remained in open country.
Louisiana
EF0	Nuba	St. Landry	30.57°N 92.06°W	0015	unknown	Brief tornado knocked a few trees down.
EF0	E of Sambo	St. Landry	30.70°N 91.85°W	0120	unknown	Brief tornado knocked a few trees and power lines down.
EF0	N of Krotz Springs	St. Landry	30.53°N 91.77°W	0210	5 miles (8.0 km)	One house and a workshop lost their roofs. Numerous trees were knocked down.
Oklahoma
EF1	W of Langston	Logan	35.94°N 97.31°W	0105	0.5 miles (0.80 km)	Four houses damaged, along with several outbuildings, trees and power poles.
Sources: SPC Storm Reports for April 18, 2009, NWS Lake Charles, NWS Dodge City, NCDC Storm Data

=== April 19 event ===
List of reported tornadoes - Sunday, April 19, 2009
EF#	Location	County	Coord.	Time (UTC)	Path length	Damage
Alabama
EF0	Whitsitt area	Hale	32.62°N 87.59°W	2252	3.55 miles (5.71 km)	Damage to trees, a barn and an outbuilding.
EF0	S of Mount Hope	Lawrence	34.46°N 87.48°W	2303	1.3 miles (2.1 km)	Minor roof damage to two homes and several trees were snapped or uprooted. First of four tornado touchdowns from a single supercell in Lawrence and Morgan Counties.
EF1	Big Prairie Creek area	Perry	32.64°N 87.49°W	2304	3.77 miles (6.07 km)	Minor roof damage to one home and damage to softwood trees.
EF0	Alabaster area (1st tornado)	Shelby	33.26°N 86.81°W	2316	1.08 miles (1.74 km)	Numerous trees snapped or uprooted and minor roof damage to several apartment complexes.
EF1	SE of Moulton	Lawrence	34.46°N 87.27°W	2318	4.5 miles (7.2 km)	A concrete industrial facility lost its roof and suffered structural damage.
EF1	N of Marion	Perry	32.67°N 87.31°W	2328	1.25 miles (2.01 km)	One house sustained minor damage, and many trees were damaged.
EF0	E of Punkin Center	Morgan	34.47°N 87.08°W	2343	2.2 miles (3.5 km)	Trees were uprooted. One tree fell on a mobile home.
EF0	Alabaster area (2nd tornado)	Shelby	33.24°N 86.82°W	2353	1.82 miles (2.93 km)	Funnel/wall cloud was captured by ABC 33-40 skycam from the University of Montevallo and by trained weather spotter's microwave signal broadcast live on ABC 33-40 storm coverage. Trees were reported down near Alabaster at Interstate 65.
EF0	S of Priceville	Morgan	34.48°N 86.87°W	2358	0.75 miles (1.21 km)	Structural damage to a shed with the rest of the damage limited to trees.
EF0	Guest area	DeKalb	34.41°N 85.87°W	0003	1.1 miles (1.8 km)	A small barn was destroyed. Remaining damage limited to trees.
EF0	W of Gibson	Montgomery	32.08°N 86.06°W	0110	0.15 miles (0.24 km)	About ten trees were snapped or uprooted. Minor shingle damage to a home and part of a metal roof was blown off a barn.
EF1	SE of Carters Hill	Montgomery	32.12°N 86.06°W	0120	0.2 miles (0.32 km)	Brief tornado overturned three horse trailers, one of which was destroyed.
EF1	N of Hustleville	Marshall	34.37°N 86.16°W	0135	3 miles (4.8 km)	1 death - Mobile home destroyed by tornado killing one person and critically injuring another occupant. Several chickens and two cows were also killed by flying debris as a chicken house was destroyed and several others damaged. Extensive damage to barns and outbuildings.
EF0	Shopton	Bullock	32.16°N 85.93°W	0136	0.1 miles (0.16 km)	Brief tornado with minor tree damage.
EF2	Highland Lake area	Blount, St. Clair	33.86°N 86.44°W	0159	6.53 miles (10.51 km)	Seven chicken houses were destroyed killing 100,000 chickens. 18 structures were damaged or destroyed in total, including a two-story house.
EF1	Hammondville area	DeKalb	34.55°N 85.70°W	0216	5.3 miles (8.5 km)	Minor roof and structural damage to a few buildings, One tree fell into a home affected by a tornado on March 28. Many trees were damaged.
EF1	NE of Ashville	St. Clair	33.87°N 86.21°W	0221	2.92 miles (4.70 km)	About 50 trees were snapped or uprooted.
EF2	Phenix City/Columbus, GA	Russell, Muscogee (GA)	32.46°N 85.00°W	0333	4 miles (6.4 km)	Over 110 houses and businesses were damaged, some of them heavily. Some of the most significant damage was on the campus of Columbus State University, where a converted dorm was heavily damaged. Hundreds of trees also damaged.
Georgia
EF1	E of Woodstock	Cherokee	34.10°N 84.44°W	0300	1.5 miles (2.4 km)	Damage was reported to over 120 houses, of which at least 12 were heavily damaged or destroyed. Some of the destruction was caused by fallen trees. Two people were injured.
Sources: SPC Storm Reports for April 19, 2009, NWS Birmingham (PIS), NWS Huntsville, NWS Peachtree City, NCDC Storm Data

=== April 20 event ===
List of reported tornadoes - Monday, April 20, 2009
EF#	Location	County	Coord.	Time (UTC)	Path length	Damage
Virginia
EF0	Raynor area	Isle of Wight	37.00°N 76.78°W	2345	8 miles (13 km)	Numerous trees toppled and minor damage to homes and sheds.
Sources: NWS Wakefield, VA, NCDC Storm Data

=== April 25 event ===
List of reported tornadoes - Saturday, April 25, 2009
EF#	Location	County	Coord.	Time (UTC)	Path length	Damage
Kansas
EF1	W of Linwood	Leavenworth	39.00°N 95.15°W	2335	8 miles (13 km)	Several barns were damaged or destroyed. Two homes sustained significant damage.
EF0	NW of Geuda Springs	Sumner	37.14°N 97.21°W	2349	1 mile (1.6 km)	Tornado remained in an open field.
EF0	N of Winfield	Cowley	37.32°N 96.94°W	0034	1 mile (1.6 km)	Tornado remained in an open field.
EF1	NE of Douglas	Butler	37.55°N 96.95°W	0129	1 mile (1.6 km)	A house and several outbuildings were damaged.
Missouri
EF0	S of Cameron	Clinton	39.73°N 94.25°W	0217	unknown	Brief touchdown with no damage.
Oklahoma
EF2	Enid	Garfield	36.40°N 97.88°W	0310	1.5 miles (2.4 km)	Significant damage on the north side of town, with the exposition centre hard hit with numerous buildings heavily damaged. Several houses also sustained roof damage.
EF2	SE of Kremlin	Garfield	36.53°N 97.81°W	0342	1 mile (1.6 km)	One house lost its roof.
EF1	S of Hillsdale	Garfield	36.52°N 98.02°W	0550	5 miles (8.0 km)	Several barns and trees were damaged.
EF1	W of Kremlin	Garfield	36.55°N 97.85°W	0639	1 mile (1.6 km)	Large tornado reported by KWTV storm trackers. A barn was destroyed and a house lost parts of its roof.
Sources: NWS Kansas City, NWS Norman, 2009 Oklahoma tornadoes

=== April 26 event ===
List of reported tornadoes - Sunday, April 26, 2009
EF#	Location	County	Coord.	Time (UTC)	Path length	Damage
Kansas
EF0	S of Potwin	Butler	37.88°N 97.02°W	2050	unknown	Brief tornado touchdown with tree damage.
EF0	NNE of Burns	Butler	38.10°N 96.87°W	2102	1 mile (1.6 km)	Brief tornado reported by a KAKE-TV spotter with no damage.
EF1	SW of Wichita	Sedgwick	37.61°N 97.50°W	2249	3.14 miles (5.05 km)	A house lost its roof and a camper was blown apart. Two people were injured.
EF0	ENE of Wathena	Doniphan	39.75°N 94.92°W	0110	unknown	Brief tornado with no damage.
Oklahoma
EF0	S of Crawford	Roger Mills	35.80°N 99.84°W	2125	4 miles (6.4 km)	Tornado reported by media outlets with no damage.
EF2	NE of Crawford	Roger Mills, Ellis	35.83°N 99.80°W	2134	11 miles (18 km)	A mobile home was destroyed.
EF0	S of Sharon	Woodward	36.18°N 99.33°W	2228	unknown	Brief rain-wrapped tornado confirmed by storm chasers.
Iowa
EF1	NE of Lafayette	Linn, Delaware	42.14°N 91.66°W	2152	22 miles (35 km)	Several farm buildings were damaged and camping trailers were destroyed.
EF0	NE of Ellston	Ringgold	40.86°N 94.07°W	2308	1.25 miles (2.01 km)	Tornado confirmed via photographs with no damage.
Wisconsin
EF0	ENE of Tennyson	Grant	42.68°N 90.61°W	2355	unknown	Brief tornado with no damage.
Sources: SPC Storm Reports for April 26, 2009, NWS Wichita, NWS Quad Cities, NWS Norman, 2009 Wisconsin Tornadoes, NCDC Storm Data

=== April 27 event ===
List of reported tornadoes - Monday, April 27, 2009
EF#	Location	County	Coord.	Time (UTC)	Path length	Damage
Texas
EF1	S of Weir	Williamson	30.63°N 97.59°W	0910	2 miles (3.2 km)	Over 20 houses were damaged, most of which was minor. Several outbuildings and sheds were destroyed.
EF1	Corsicana area	Navarro	32.08°N 96.48°W	1330	0.4 miles (0.64 km)	Ten structures were damaged including the Lee Academy School. One person was injured at the school.
EF0	SSW of Wills Point	Van Zandt	32.67°N 96.00°W	1428	1 mile (1.6 km)	Brief tornado with no damage.
EF0	NNW of Yorktown	DeWitt	29.02°N 97.52°W	2036	unknown	Brief tornado damaged a mobile home.
EF0	NE of Bleakwood	Newton	30.70°N 93.78°W	0225	unknown	Brief tornado knocked down a few trees.
EF0	Holly Springs	Jasper	30.87°N 93.87°W	0229	unknown	Brief tornado reported by local law enforcement with no damage.
Arkansas
EF1	NE of Clarksville	Johnson	35.47°N 93.44°W	2311	3.1 miles (5.0 km)	A garden shed was destroyed while, two turkey houses, one chicken house, a farm shed and several homes had roof damage.
Sources: SPC Storm Reports for April 26, 2009, SPC Storm Reports for April 27, 2009, NWS Dallas/Fort Worth, NWS Little Rock, NWS Austin/San Antonio, NCDC Storm Data

=== April 28 event ===
List of reported tornadoes - Tuesday, April 28, 2009
EF#	Location	County	Coord.	Time (UTC)	Path length	Damage
Texas
EF0	SSE of Eaton	Robertson	30.92°N 96.32°W	2026	unknown	Brief tornado with no damage.
EF0	NW of Wedge	Brazos	30.92°N 96.30°W	2041	3 miles (4.8 km)	Narrow tornado tracked across open country.
EF0	N of North Zulch	Madison	30.93°N 96.10°W	2100	2 miles (3.2 km)	Narrow tornado tracked across open country.
EF0	SE of Mecca	Madison	30.87°N 96.05°W	2230	2 miles (3.2 km)	Tornado spotted by Texas A&M University storm chasers with no damage.
New Mexico
EF0	SE of White City	Eddy	32.05°N 104.22°W	0125	5 miles (8.0 km)	Tornado confirmed with only minor tree limb damage.
Sources: NCDC Storm Data

=== April 29 event ===
List of reported tornadoes - Wednesday, April 29, 2009
EF#	Location	County	Coord.	Time (UTC)	Path length	Damage
Oklahoma
EF1	N of Stratford	Garvin McClain	34.79°N 97.01°W	1511	7 miles (11 km)	A house lost part of its roof. Several barns and outbuildings and a greenhouse were destroyed.
EF1	W of Wewoka	Seminole	35.16°N 96.52°W	1627	2 miles (3.2 km)	A house was significantly damaged by the tornado. Scattered minor building and tree damage also occurred.
EF0	NE of Yeager	Hughes	35.16°N 96.30°W	1640	1.5 miles (2.4 km)	Damage reported to several houses and a travel trailer.
Texas
EF0	NE of Tampico	Hall	34.54°N 100.69°W	2120	3 miles (4.8 km)	Tornado reported with no damage.
EF0	N of Parnell	Hall	34.53°N 100.60°W	2125	3 miles (4.8 km)	Satellite tornado adjacent to the Tampico tornado, also with no damage.
EF2	S of Bakersfield	Terrell	30.44°N 102.05°W	2200	0.4 miles (0.64 km)	Paint and stairs were removed from an oil tank. Extensive damage to mesquite and cedar trees. Gravel and large rocks were scoured off the ground.
EF0	E of South Plains	Floyd	34.22°N 101.12°W	2213	unknown	Brief tornado with no damage.
EF1	SE of South Plains (1st tornado)	Floyd	34.15°N 101.16°W	2311	4 miles (6.4 km)	Cone tornado knocked down some trees and power poles.
EF0	SE of South Plains (2nd tornado)	Floyd	34.12°N 101.12°W	2319	1 mile (1.6 km)	Satellite tornado adjacent to the tornado also ongoing at the same time remained in open country.
EF1	SE of McBride	Carson	35.45°N 101.37°W	2330	1 mile (1.6 km)	At least 11 power poles were snapped.
EF0	NNW of Panhandle	Carson	35.37°N 101.38°W	2336	unknown	Brief tornado snapped a few power poles.
EF0	N of Dougherty	Floyd	34.07°N 101.11°W	2358	2 miles (3.2 km)	Tornado spotted by storm chasers in open rangeland.
EF0	N of Finney	King	33.78°N 100.37°W	0118	unknown	Brief tornado spotted by a local rancher with no damage.
EF0	E of Dickens	Dickens	33.62°N 100.54°W	0128	2 miles (3.2 km)	Intermittent tornado remained in open rangeland.
Arkansas
EF0	SW of Witter	Madison	35.88°N 93.76°W	2201	3 miles (4.8 km)	Damage to a mobile and a large storage building.
EF0	NE of Ozark	Franklin	35.53°N 93.78°W	2207	1 mile (1.6 km)	One barn destroyed, 6 homes damaged and several trees uprooted or damaged.
Kansas
EF0	NW of Plymell (1st tornado)	Finney	37.87°N 100.96°W	0600	1 mile (1.6 km)	Brief landspout over sand hills with no damage.
EF1	NW of Plymell (2nd tornado)	Finney	37.85°N 100.88°W	0626	2 miles (3.2 km)	Two mobile homes were destroyed and several houses lost parts of their roofs. One person was injured.
EF1	NE of Plymell	Finney	37.82°N 100.86°W	0633	4 miles (6.4 km)	Over 200 head of cattle were killed as a large dairy barn took a direct hit and was destroyed. Damage to modular homes and 15 pivot irrigation sprinklers. One person was injured.
EF1	W of Plymell	Finney	37.80°N 100.89°W	0637	1 mile (1.6 km)	Landspout tornado with three pivot sprinklers destroyed.
EF1	W of Plymell	Finney, Haskell	37.75°N 100.84°W	0644	2 miles (3.2 km)	Three pivot sprinklers and several trees were damaged.
Sources: SPC Storm Reports for April 29, 2009, NWS Tulsa, NWS Dodge City, KS, NWS Norman (PIS), NWS Midland/Odessa, 2009 Oklahoma tornadoes, NCDC Storm Data

=== April 30 event ===
List of reported tornadoes - Thursday, April 30, 2009
EF#	Location	County	Coord.	Time (UTC)	Path length	Damage
Arkansas
EF0	SE of Elmo	Independence, Jackson	35.60°N 91.36°W	2113	0.6 miles (0.97 km)	A power pole was downed.
Kentucky
EF0	S of Bell City	Graves	36.51°N 88.50°W	0011	unknown	Brief tornado touchdown with minor damage to a few trees.
EF0	SE of Murray	Calloway	36.67°N 88.25°W	0044	0.75 miles (1.21 km)	Minor siding damage to a home and several trees damaged.
Sources: NWS Little Rock, Storm Reports for April 30, 2009, NWS Paducah, NCDC Storm Data

== See also ==
- Tornadoes of 2009
- List of United States tornadoes from January to March 2009
- List of United States tornadoes in May 2009
