= Tornado outbreak of April 9–11, 2009 =

Weather event in the United States

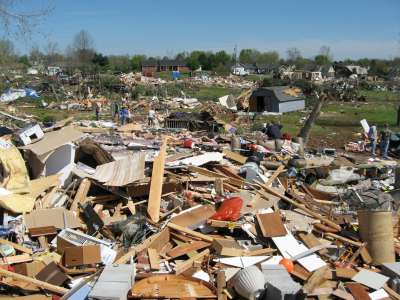
- Damage from the EF4 Murfreesboro tornado

Meteorological history
- Date: April 9–11, 2009

Tornado outbreak
- Tornadoes: 85
- Max. rating: EF4 tornado
- Duration: 31 hours, 37 minutes

Overall effects
- Casualties: 5 deaths, 143 injuries (+4 non-tornadic deaths, 62 non-tornadic injuries)
- Damage: $464 million

The tornado outbreak of April 9–11, 2009 was a tornado outbreak that affected large portions of the Southern United States on April 9–11, 2009. At least five people were killed by tornadoes including three in Mena, Arkansas and two in Murfreesboro, Tennessee just south of Nashville. A total of 85 tornadoes were confirmed over the two days. Three people were killed in Texas due to wildfires caused by strong winds stemming from the same storm system. This event is sometimes referred to as the Good Friday tornado outbreak of 2009.

== Meteorological synopsis ==
A storm system over the southern Great Plains region resulted in severe weather development during the late afternoon and evening along a dry line that stretched from southern Kansas across northeastern Oklahoma into southwestern Missouri and northwest Arkansas. As a result, a moderate risk of severe weather was issued by the Storm Prediction Center for eastern Oklahoma, southeast Kansas, southwest Missouri and western Arkansas. The system approached as the atmosphere destabilized as a result of daytime heating. Thunderstorms began developmenting along a dry line in Oklahoma between 2 and 3 pm CDT (1900 and 2000 UTC). More thunderstorms started forming as they approached into western Arkansas, and encountered a strong wind field around the incoming system. Winds began turning with height, which caused some thunderstorms to rotate and spawn tornadoes. Beginning at 6:20 CDT (2320 UTC), several tornadoes were produced in eastern sections of Oklahoma and Texas. The severe weather then moved into Arkansas, where a tornado killed three people in Mena. The thunderstorms that affected Texas then went into Louisiana, creating numerous tornadoes in the state, one of which tracked through downtown Shreveport.

At 1:00 a.m. CDT on April 9, 2009, the Storm Prediction Center outlined a Day 2 slight risk for much the southeastern United States, stretching from Kentucky to central Georgia. A 30% probability of severe weather within 25 miles (40 km) of a point was centered over portions of central Tennessee, northwestern Georgia, and northeastern Alabama, as sufficient moisture from the Gulf of Mexico, steep mid-level lapse rates, MLCAPE values of 1500–2000 J/KG, and strong wind shear were forecasted to be present.

At 1:00 a.m. on April 10, the Storm Prediction Center upgraded the Day 1 outlook to a moderate risk of severe weather, covering portions of Tennessee, western South Carolina, northern Georgia, and northeastern Alabama. A 10% probability for a tornado within 25 miles (40 km) of a point was outlined for the same area, along with a 30% probability of damaging winds and a 45% probability for large hail within 25 miles (40 km) of a point. A weakening surface low traveling eastward over the Ozarkscombined with increasing atmospheric moisture and dew points near 60 °F (16 °C), MLCAPE values around 1500–2000 J/KG, a 30–50 kn (35–58 mph; 56–93 km/h) southwesterly low-level jet, and 50–70 kn (58–81 mph; 93–130 km/h) westerly mid-level flow, contributing to strong and favorable deep-level shear. All these factors contributed to an environment primed for supercellular development capable of producing strong winds, large hail, and tornadoes.

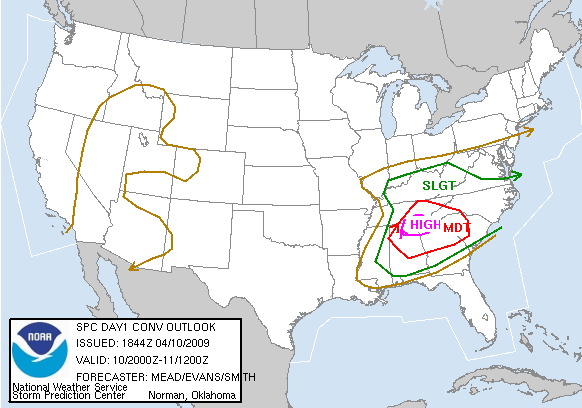
April 10, 2009 Day 1 Convective Outlook at 1844Z (1:44 PM CDT)

At 8:00 a.m., the moderate risk was expanded southward and a 15% hatched (Note: A hatched risk is a 10% or greater probability of EF2+ tornadoes within 25 miles of a point within an area.) probability for tornadoes was added over central Tennessee, northern Georgia, and northeastern Alabama, as 60–70 kn (69–81 mph; 110–130 km/h) westerly mid-level flow supported discrete and semi-discrete supercells along the cold front. At 4:00 p.m., several hours after the tornado that struck Murfreesboro had dissipated, the outlook was changed to include a high risk for severe weather over the meeting point of Georgia, Alabama, and Tennessee, along with an increase to a 30% hatched probability for tornadoes with 25 miles of a point as an outbreak of supercells was ongoing in a favorable environment for tornadic development.

The thunderstorms moved southeast across much of South Carolina, Georgia and Alabama later that afternoon and into the evening. They produced tornadoes in northeastern sections of Alabama, damaging homes in Langston and Powell. Further south, tornadoes damaged areas in central Alabama, one of which tracked through three counties and into the Montgomery metropolitan area. One area of thunderstorms that evening produced a long-tracked tornado that moved from Grovetown, Georgia, through Augusta and ended in Ellenton, South Carolina. The tornado moved across Augusta but missed the Augusta National Golf Club where the Masters Tournament was taking place during the weekend. The storm system reached the Atlantic Coast during the early morning hours of April 11, producing one tornado in North Carolina.

== Confirmed tornadoes ==
Confirmed tornadoes by Enhanced Fujita rating
EFU	EF0	EF1	EF2	EF3	EF4	EF5	Total
0	29	39	12	9	1	0	90

=== April 9 event ===
List of reported tornadoes – Thursday, April 9, 2009
EF#	Location	County/Parish	Coord.	Time (UTC)	Path length	Damage
Oklahoma
EF0	E of Vinita	Craig	36.64°N 95.08°W	2303	2.4 miles (3.9 km)	Roofs were torn off several homes and a barn. Damage to two power poles.
EF0	SE of Wilburton	Latimer	34.82°N 95.30°W	2318	4.3 miles (6.9 km)	Several houses and a gas compressor station were damaged.
EF1	ENE of Nashoba	Pushmataha	34.50°N 95.12°W	2342	7.7 miles (12.4 km)	Many trees were damaged, including snapped trunks.
EF1	N of Wister	Le Flore	35.00°N 94.82°W	2355	7.5 miles (12.1 km)	Several homes were damaged and several barns were destroyed.
EF2	E of Big Cedar	Le Flore, Polk (AR)	34.62°N 94.57°W	0026	9.2 miles (14.8 km)	Several mobile homes and a permanent home were heavily damaged or destroyed. Four people were injured, one of whom sustained broken bones.
EF3	Eagletown to Dierks, AR	McCurtain, Sevier (AR), Howard (AR), Pike (AR)	34.01°N 94.48°W	0101	29 miles (47 km)	See section on this tornado - 7 people were injured
Texas
EF1	NW of Hughes Springs	Morris, Cass	33.07°N 94.66°W	0052	6 miles (9.7 km)	Damage to trees and power lines along the path.
EF2	NW of Linden	Cass	33.05°N 94.49°W	0105	16 miles (26 km)	Many trees were knocked down, crushing houses and vehicles. A two-story house was severely damaged, and a portable building was blown away.
EF0	NE of Bivins	Cass	33.05°N 94.12°W	0141	2.4 miles (3.9 km)	Numerous trees were knocked down along its path.
EF1	NW of Hallsville	Harrison	32.61°N 94.64°W	0213	3.1 miles (5.0 km)	Several houses damaged by falling trees and windows blown out. A large shed was ripped from its foundation.
EF2	Waskom to Bossier City, LA	Harrison, Caddo (LA), Bossier (LA)	32.54°N 94.14°W	0248	38.5 miles (62.0 km)	Continuous long-track tornado with many houses and businesses damaged along its path, some of which were nearly destroyed. Tornado tracked near Cross Lake and eventually into downtown Shreveport (with little damage there) before crossing the Red River into Bossier City. Damage was also reported at Barksdale Air Force Base. Two people were injured and overall damage was about $14 million.
Arkansas
EF3	SW of Mena to NE of Ink	Polk	34.58°N 94.54°W	0102–0117	14.84 miles (23.88 km)	3 deaths – See section on this tornado – 30 people were injured.
EF2	Center Point area	Howard	34.01°N 93.96°W	0134	2.5 miles (4.0 km)	Rare large anticyclonic tornado severely damaged a house and a barn. One person was injured.
EF3	N of Kiblah	Miller	33.06°N 93.99°W	0151	10 miles (16 km)	An outbuilding and a mobile home were destroyed, throwing debris half a mile (800 m) away. Major tree damage along its path.
EF1	SE of Newhope	Pike	34.20°N 93.84°W	0153	3 miles (4.8 km)	Many trees were knocked down on private timber company land.
EF2	S of Crossett	Ashley	33.10°N 91.97°W	0427	14 miles (23 km)	15 houses, including some mobile homes, were heavily damaged or destroyed and 27 others were damaged to lesser degrees. Many trees were also damaged or knocked over.
Missouri
EF0	Nixa area	Christian	37.06°N 93.32°W	0120	1.6 miles (2.6 km)	Minor damage to more than a dozen homes with additional damage to trees and fences. Several power lines were also downed by the tornado along Route 160.
Louisiana
EF0	NNE of Bolinger	Bossier	32.98°N 93.68°W	0302	0.75 miles (1.21 km)	Several trees were snapped in a heavily forested area.
EF0	NE of Heflin	Webster	32.47°N 93.27°W	0404	2.25 miles (3.62 km)	Several trees were snapped or uprooted.
EF1	NE of Litroe	Union	33.00°N 92.17°W	0421	5 miles (8.0 km)	Tornado damaged trees in the Upper Ouachita Wildlife Refuge.
EF1	S of Simsboro	Lincoln	32.48°N 92.81°W	0433	4.4 miles (7.1 km)	Many trees were snapped and a house sustained minor roof damage.
EF2	NE of Eros	Jackson, Ouachita	32.42°N 92.37°W	0505	11.7 miles (18.8 km)	Several houses were damaged, one of them heavily with its roof torn off. Many trees were damaged, with some falling onto structures.
EF1	Delhi area	Richland, Madison	32.44°N 91.53°W	0627	4.5 miles (7.2 km)	Tornado roughly paralleled Interstate 20 with some trees down and minor damage to a few houses.
Sources: SPC Storm Reports for April 9, 2009, NWS Little Rock, NWS Tulsa, NWS Springfield, NWS Jackson, NWS Shreveport, NCDC Storm Data

=== April 10 event ===
List of reported tornadoes – Friday, April 10, 2009
EF#	Location	County/Parish	Coord.	Time (UTC)	Path length	Damage
Alabama
EF0	Martling area	Marshall	34.38°N 86.17°W	1038	1.9 miles (3.1 km)	Early-morning weak tornado produced minor roof damage to a few homes, heavily damaged two sheds and peeled the roof off a barn.
EF0	SSW of Thach	Limestone	34.88°N 86.91°W	1859	unknown	Brief tornado with up to 20 trees were snapped at mile marker 359 on Interstate 65.
EF3	E of Grant	Marshall, Jackson, DeKalb	34.53°N 86.20°W	2002	33 miles (53 km)	Long track tornado with many houses heavily damaged in the area along Lake Guntersville and in subdivisions to the east, with a few destroyed. Many mobile homes and boat houses were also destroyed along its path. Five people were injured.
EF1	SW of Roxana	Tallapoosa, Lee	32.65°N 85.85°W	0012	18 miles (29 km)	Numerous barns and outbuildings were heavily damaged. Many trees were also knocked down.
EF1	Loachapoka area	Lee	32.60°N 85.59°W	0030	6 miles (9.7 km)	A church sustained moderate roof damage and many outbuildings, a few vehicles and hundreds of trees were damaged.
EF1	S of Beauregard	Lee	32.52°N 85.38°W	0051	2.25 miles (3.62 km)	Damage to several structures including a mobile home and roof damage to buildings.
EF1	Crawford area	Russell	32.46°N 85.27°W	0104	6 miles (9.7 km)	Damage limited to uprooted trees.
EF1	Phenix City	Russell	32.42°N 85.09°W	0119	1 mile (1.6 km)	Tornado touched down at the Phenix City dragstrip. The most severe damage was at a mobile home park, where two people were injured.
EF1	Notasulga area	Tallapoosa, Macon, Lee	32.58°N 85.76°W	0126	25.3 miles (40.7 km)	Several houses sustained minor damage and mobile homes sustained significant damage. Thousands of trees were snapped or uprooted.
EF1	Montgomery area	Montgomery, Macon, Bullock	32.33°N 86.21°W	0148	26.1 miles (42.0 km)	Tornado tracked across the eastern side of the Montgomery metropolitan area and continued eastward. Dozens of houses were damaged, and at least three barns and numerous outbuildings were destroyed. Thousands of trees were damaged.
EF1	Seale area	Russell	32.31°N 85.11°W	0220	0.5 miles (0.80 km)	One mobile home was destroyed injuring its occupant. Several trees were also blown down.
Tennessee
EF1	NE of Camden	Benton	36.13°N 88.03°W	1541	4.5 miles (7.2 km)	12 homes and two mobile homes suffered roof damage while several outbuildings were destroyed.
EF0	NW of Waverly	Humphreys	36.17°N 87.92°W	1550	1 mile (1.6 km)	Brief tornado touchdown in the Highlands on Kentucky Lake subdivision snapped a few trees.
EF1	N of Waverly	Humphreys, Houston	36.20°N 87.80°W	1559	12 miles (19 km)	Five houses were damaged and a mobile home and two barns were destroyed. Extensive tree damage.
EF4	N of Eagleville to NE of Murfreesboro	Rutherford	35.85°N 86.41°W	1719–1755	23.25 miles (37.42 km)	2 deaths – See section on this tornado – 58 people were injured
EF1	SSW of Portland	Sumner	36.52°N 86.55°W	1749	0.6 miles (0.97 km)	Tornado touched down near the Johnston Crossroads community. Four houses and a mobile home lost their roofs and trees were damaged.
EF0	SE of Rucker	Rutherford	35.73°N 86.37°W	1758	0.2 miles (0.32 km)	A house was damaged from a blown tree along a short path.
EF1	Pleasant View	Rutherford	35.76°N 86.26°W	1801	3.7 miles (6.0 km)	Four houses and a barn were damaged and trees were uprooted.
EF0	W of Woodbury	Cannon	35.82°N 86.12°W	1819	0.8 miles (1.3 km)	Minimal damage, mostly to trees.
EF0	W of Hillsboro	Coffee	35.42°N 86.00°W	1918	0.25 miles (0.40 km)	Brief tornado videotaped by a storm chaser along Interstate 24 with no damage.
EF1	S of Monterey	Putnam, Cumberland	36.05°N 85.32°W	1922	12 miles (19 km)	Many trees were twisted, snapped or uprooted. Several farm buildings and many fences were also damaged.
EF2	S of Dunlap	Sequatchie	35.31°N 85.46°W	2002	5 miles (8.0 km)	Several houses and a school sustained minor to moderate damage. Severe tree damage with trunks snapped.
EF1	E of Dunlap	Sequatchie	35.36°N 85.35°W	2005	0.2 miles (0.32 km)	Brief tornado damaged a house and several trees.
EF1	ENE of Sale Creek	Hamilton	35.38°N 85.11°W	2023	0.5 miles (0.80 km)	One house was damaged and many trees were knocked down.
Kentucky
EF0	W of Almo	Calloway	36.68°N 83.43°W	1616	0.25 miles (0.40 km)	Tornado embedded in a microburst. Several houses sustained minor damage and trees damaged.
EF1	NE of Eddyville	Lyon	37.10°N 83.03°W	1645	0.33 miles (0.53 km)	A mobile home was overturned by a short-lived tornado, injuring one person. A commercial building was also damaged.
EF0	NW of Crofton	Christian	37.03°N 87.51°W	1647	1.5 miles (2.4 km)	Tornado confirmed by emergency management. Minor damage to several buildings on a farm.
EF3	Mannington area	Christian, Hopkins	37.12°N 87.49°W	1654	2 miles (3.2 km)	Tornado touched down in the community with 2 houses destroyed according to WEHT-TV. Two people inside a destroyed house were injured—one severely.
EF0	W of Eubank	Pulaski	37.27°N 84.63°W	1856	unknown	Brief tornado with debris visible but no damage.
EF1	NE of Eubank	Pulaski, Lincoln	37.28°N 84.65°W	1917	6.5 miles (10.5 km)	Several barns, a metal shed and two mobile homes were destroyed. Several other structures including homes were damaged. One conventional home was pushed off 10 feet (3.0 m) from its foundation.
Georgia
EF2	Summerville	Chattooga	34.28°N 84.65°W	2100	0.9 miles (1.4 km)	Over 30 homes and 10 businesses were damaged, with a lumber warehouse and car care center taking the most damage. One mobile home was destroyed.
EF1	NE of Jasper	Pickens	34.47°N 84.45°W	2204	3.5 miles (5.6 km)	Damage limited to trees, utility poles and power lines.
EF2	NNE of Carnesville	Franklin	34.42°N 83.27°W	2253	4.5 miles (7.2 km)	Several houses and mobile homes were heavily damaged. A chicken house was flattened and others were damaged.
EF1	SE of Dunn	Forsyth	34.20°N 84.07°W	2257	0.5 miles (0.80 km)	Brief tornado/waterspout on the shores of Lake Lanier damaged at least 100 trees – some falling on a house – and destroyed at least three boats and two boat docks.
EF1	SE of Ochille	Chattahoochee	32.35°N 84.97°W	0146	4 miles (6.4 km)	Several outbuildings and sheds were destroyed. Hundreds of trees were also damaged.
EF0	NNE of Boneville	McDuffie	33.45°N 82.43°W	0153	unknown	Brief tornado with trees down, some on vehicles.
EF1	NE of Cussetta	Chattahoochee	32.30°N 84.78°W	0200	4 miles (6.4 km)	Minor damage to two homes, one church and several sheds. A metal storage building was destroyed.
EF0	NW of Sparta	Hancock	33.30°N 83.00°W	0219	1.5 miles (2.4 km)	Damage to one mobile home.
EF0	N of Sparta	Hancock	33.29°N 82.98°W	0223	1.1 miles (1.8 km)	Damage limited to trees.
EF3	NE of Sparta	Hancock	33.28°N 82.96°W	0228	6.5 miles (10.5 km)	Two homes and a mobile home were destroyed with damage to two other homes. Numerous trees were flattened. One person was injured and a Shetland pony was killed.
EF3	Grovetown to Augusta	Columbia, Richmond	33.45°N 82.20°W	0230	18 miles (29 km)	Large wedge tornado with significant damage along a swath roughly paralleling U.S. Route 278 in the Augusta area, including to many houses, businesses and mobile homes. 12 people were injured at a nursing home which was hit and over 150 had to be evacuated.
EF0	SE of Gibson	Glascock	33.28°N 82.96°W	0256	0.6 miles (0.97 km)	A few pine trees were damaged.
EF1	NW of Seville	Sumter, Dooly, Wilcox	32.10°N 84.02°W	0300	25 miles (40 km)	Two houses sustained significant roof damage along a long track. Severe damage was also reported to several mobile homes, a radio tower and over 1,000 trees.
EF0	N of Vienna	Dooly	32.10°N 83.79°W	0320	6 miles (9.7 km)	One house sustained roof damage, a chicken house was destroyed and a tin roof was peeled from a barn.
EF3	St. Clair area	Burke	33.12°N 82.03°W	0334	26 miles (42 km)	Long track tornado with numerous houses and a church heavily damaged. A grocery store was also destroyed, as were many trees. Four people were injured, one seriously.
EF1	NE of Plains	Sumter	33.12°N 82.03°W	0340	1 mile (1.6 km)	Spotty light damage mostly to trees.
EF1	S of David	Glascock, Jefferson	33.25°N 82.50°W	0402	4 miles (6.4 km)	A church and its cemetery were heavily damaged. Many trees were knocked down.
EF1	Cobb area	Sumter, Crisp, Wilcox	31.96°N 83.99°W	0415	33 miles (53 km)	About 70 houses were damaged, some of them heavily. Heavy damage to trees and power lines.
EF0	NE of Keysville	Burke	33.25°N 82.13°W	0434	2 miles (3.2 km)	Many trees were knocked down.
South Carolina
EF0	W of Long Creek	Oconee	34.76°N 81.27°W	2230	unknown	Brief tornado with no damage.
EF1	S of Townville	Anderson	34.49°N 81.88°W	2323	3 miles (4.8 km)	Several houses were damaged due to fallen trees along Lake Hartwell, and a trailer was thrown off its blocks.
EF0	NW of Campbell	Anderson	34.49°N 81.88°W	2350	2 miles (3.2 km)	A few trees were snapped or uprooted.
EF1	NW of Watts	Abbeville	34.16°N 82.51°W	0023	2 miles (3.2 km)	Two houses were damaged, one of them by fallen trees.
EF2	Abbeville area	Abbeville	34.18°N 82.47°W	0028	7 miles (11 km)	A half-dozen homes lost their entire roof, numerous trailers were destroyed and other buildings were heavily damaged. Two people were injured.
EF1	S of Jonesville	Union	34.81°N 81.86°W	0032	4 miles (6.4 km)	At least four mobile homes were damaged with some debris landing in trees. A textile plant was also damaged.
EF1	Greenwood area	Greenwood	34.19°N 82.15°W	0041	5 miles (8.0 km)	A few houses were damaged, one of which lost its roof. Extensive and severe tree damage along the intermittent path.
EF1	N of Greenwood	Greenwood	34.21°N 82.14°W	0043	3 miles (4.8 km)	Several houses were damaged, one of which lost its roof. A train derailed after a tree fell on the track.
EF3	Beech Island area	Aiken	33.40°N 81.85°W	0257	15 miles (24 km)	Many houses and businesses were severely damaged or destroyed. 14 people were injured and one indirect death occurred due to an auto accident.
EF1	N of Averill	Allendale	33.10°N 81.48°W	0426	1.2 miles (1.9 km)	Extensive tree damage along its path but no structural damage.
EF2	NE of Martin	Allendale	33.10°N 81.48°W	0430	1.2 miles (1.9 km)	A mobile home was heavily damaged and several other houses were damaged. Extensive tree damage.
EF0	NW of Millett	Barnwell	33.15°N 81.67°W	0521	unknown	Brief tornado damaged a few trees along the Savannah River.
Sources: SPC Storm Reports for April 10, 2009, NWS Nashville, NWS Paducah, NWS Huntsville, NWS Morristown, NWS Birmingham, NWS Louisville, NWS Jackson, KY, NWS Peachtree City, NWS Charleston, SC, NWS Greenville, SC, NCDC Storm Data

=== April 11 event ===
List of reported tornadoes – Saturday, April 11, 2009
EF#	Location	County/Parish	Coord.	Time (UTC)	Path length	Damage
North Carolina
EF0	E of Washington	Beaufort	35.59°N 76.95°W	0640	400 yards (370 m)	Minor damage to several houses, one of which had roof damage. Numerous trees were knocked down.
Sources: SPC Storm Reports for April 10, 2009, NCDC Storm Data

=== Eagletown, Oklahoma/De Queen–Dierks–New Hope, Arkansas ===
Eagletown, Oklahoma/De Queen–Dierks–New Hope, Arkansas
- Tornado damage to a mobile home in De Queen

Meteorological history
- Formed: April 9, 2009 8:01 p.m. CDT (UTC-05:00)
- Dissipated: April 9. 2009 8:52 p.m. CDT (UTC-05:00)
- Duration: 51 minutes

EF3 tornado
- on the Enhanced Fujita scale
- Highest winds: 140 mph (230 km/h)

Overall effects
- Casualties: 7 injuries
- Damage: $4.551 million (2009 USD)

This long-tracked and intense EF3 tornado initially touched down in McCurtain County, Oklahoma near the Arkansas state line. The tornado would down several trees, and a couple of power lines in McCurtain County before crossing state lines into Arkansas. After crossing state lines, the tornado entered Sevier County, rapidly tracking northeastward, destroying at least 10 to 12 mobile homes north of De Queen. Numerous trees and power lines were uprooted or snapped. A total 7 people were injured in Sevier County, all of which occurring north of De Queen. The tornado continued into Howard County, resulting in significant damage in The Dierks Lake area near the county line with Sevier County. The tornado would cause significant roof damage to The Army Corps of Engineers office, with numerous roofing materials found tossed into several trees nearby. The most intense damage in Howard County would occur to the second story of a reinforced concrete building, which was completely destroyed, and its remains were scattered across the nearby road. The tornado continued into Pike County southwest of New Hope, knocking down or snapping several hundred trees at EF1 intensity before dissipating at 8:52 p.m.

Overall, the tornado had a maximum path length extending out 37.18 miles (59.84 km), and a maximum path width of 850 yards (0.48 mi).

=== Mena, Arkansas ===
Mena, Arkansas
- The nocturnal tornado approaching Mena, Arkansas

Meteorological history
- Date: April 9, 2009
- Formed: April 9, 2009; 8:01 PM CDT (UTC−05:00)
- Dissipated: April 9, 2009; 8:17 PM CDT (UTC−05:00)
- Duration: 16 minutes

EF3 tornado
- on the Enhanced Fujita scale
- Highest winds: 165 mph (266 km/h)

Overall effects
- Fatalities: 3
- Injuries: 30
- Damage: $130 million (2009 USD)

At 7:24 p.m. CDT (0024 UTC) on April 9, a tornado warning was issued for areas north of Mena in Polk County, Arkansas, and at 8:01 p.m. CDT (0101 UTC) the warning extended into the city. A tornado touched down one minute later a few miles southwest of Mena and travelled north of Highway 59/71 into the western part of town. Three people were killed, thirty people were injured, and 600 homes were either damaged or destroyed in Mena. One death was caused after the roof inside a Masonic Lodge lounge collapsed on the victim. The other two victims were killed after the tornado hit their homes. The Polk County Jail was severely damaged to the point that minor offense prisoners were released, with serious offenders taken to jails around the area. The Polk County Courthouse received damage after a radio antenna fell over onto part of the building, damaging the roof. The Mena Regional Health System also sustained damage, but continued to treat patients and ran off auxiliary power. Mena City Hall, the police station, and the fire department were all damaged as well. The high winds from the tornado threw a bus into a tree. The roof at the Mena Middle School was significantly damaged, with part of the gymnasium roof ripped off and a portable classroom was destroyed. The damage to the middle school was so severe that it had to be condemned. The tornado also heavily impacted Rich Mountain Community College and destroyed two businesses at the city's industrial park. The tornado that hit Mena was rated EF3 by the National Weather Service in Little Rock, Arkansas.

As the tornado moved northeast of town, it destroyed a tractor dealership and heavily impacted many homes and farms. The tornado continued through rural areas until lifting northeast of Ink at 8:17 p.m. CDT (0117 UTC). It travelled 14.84 miles (23.88 km) across Polk County, reaching a maximum width of 1,075 yards (983 m). In total in the county, 165 houses were destroyed, 701 more houses sustained major damage, and more than 11,000 trees were downed along the path.

=== Murfreesboro, Tennessee ===
Murfreesboro, Tennessee
- The tornado as seen from a security camera at Siegel High School

Meteorological history
- Formed: April 10, 2009, 12:19 p.m. CDT
- Dissipated: April 10, 2009, 12:55 p.m. CDT
- Duration: 36 minutes

EF4 tornado
- on the Enhanced Fujita scale
- Highest winds: 170 mph (270 km/h)

Overall effects
- Fatalities: 2
- Injuries: 58

This violent and destructive tornado first touched down at 12:19 p.m. just north of Eagleville, inflicting damage to the roof of a home and trees near the Kelly Road/US 41 Alt. intersection. The tornado then began to track northeastward, causing scattered damage to trees along Rocky Grove Road and damaging a house along Newnan Road around 2 miles (3.2 km) north of Windrow. The tornado continued to extensively damage trees and damage the roofs of several residences before crossing Patterson Road, where a brick home was completely demolished and lofted almost entirely off the foundation. The tornado then crossed Wilkinson Pike, where two homes were entirely destroyed, before crossing Highland Park Drive and destroying another two homes at low-end EF4 intensity. Out of the four homes, only one was properly anchored to its foundation. The tornado then entered Stones River Battlefield, where it damaged and blew down trees within a swath that was 0.25 miles (0.40 km) wide and 1 mile (1.6 km) long. Numerous fences were destroyed in this area, and one fallen tree damaged a cemetery wall and cannon display.

A home swept off its foundation near Battleground Drive

The tornado then crossed near the Thompson Lane/Broad Street intersection where numerous large vehicles, including several semi trucks, were tossed and piled together. In the area from Wilkinson Pike to Thompson Lane, two people were seriously injured and several homes were demolished. Additionally, various trees were uprooted and power poles were destroyed. Various businesses in the Thompson Lane/Broad Street area suffered severe damage, including a Shell convenience store and Huddleston-Steele Engineering. Nearby, several homes suffered severe damage, including some that were well built and had exterior and interior walls collapsed. The tornado then reintensified to low-end EF4 strength as it tracked across Battleground Drive between D'Ann Drive and Tomahawk Trace, where three homes were swept clean from their foundations and completely demolished, with one being unanchored and the other two being very well constructed. In this area, several trees were debarked. The tornado then passed near Cornwall Court, where three poorly anchored homes were completely destroyed and lofted off of their foundations. Continuous damage was reported from Tomahawk Trace to Compton Road. The tornado then struck a well built, two-story brick house along Bushnell Drive just north of Compton Road, with the home being mostly destroyed and only having part of a kitchen wall still standing. Shortly after, the tornado dissipated at 12:55 p.m. after being on the ground for 36 minutes.

During the tornado's 36 minute lifespan, it tracked 23.25 miles (37.42 km) miles, reached a maximum width of 750 yards (0.43 mi; 0.69 km), and impacted over 845 homes, with 117 being destroyed, 298 sustaining major damage, 175 having minor damage, and 255 others being otherwise affected. Along the tornado's path, two people were killed and 58 others were injured.

== Non-tornadic events ==
During the passage of the dry line and cold front, very strong winds in central Oklahoma and northern Texas occurred behind the severe weather. Wind gusts exceeded 60 miles per hour (97 km/h) while dew points were in the 20s °F (below -2 °C) behind the dry line with temperatures reaching into the 80s °F (upper 20s °C). The combination of hot and very dry air and very strong winds sparked numerous wildfires during the late afternoon hours. In Oklahoma, 62 people were injured by the wildfires. One hundred structures were destroyed in Oklahoma County, of which 12 homes in Midwest City and 58 homes in Choctaw were destroyed. In Texas, three people were killed in Montague County, as wildfires burned more than 150,000 acres (610 km^{2}) and destroyed two towns in the county. Officials later confirmed that one of the wildfires in Midwest City was set deliberately. In South Carolina, one man was killed in a car accident after crashing into trees that had fallen into the roadway as severe weather created poor visibility.

== Aftermath ==
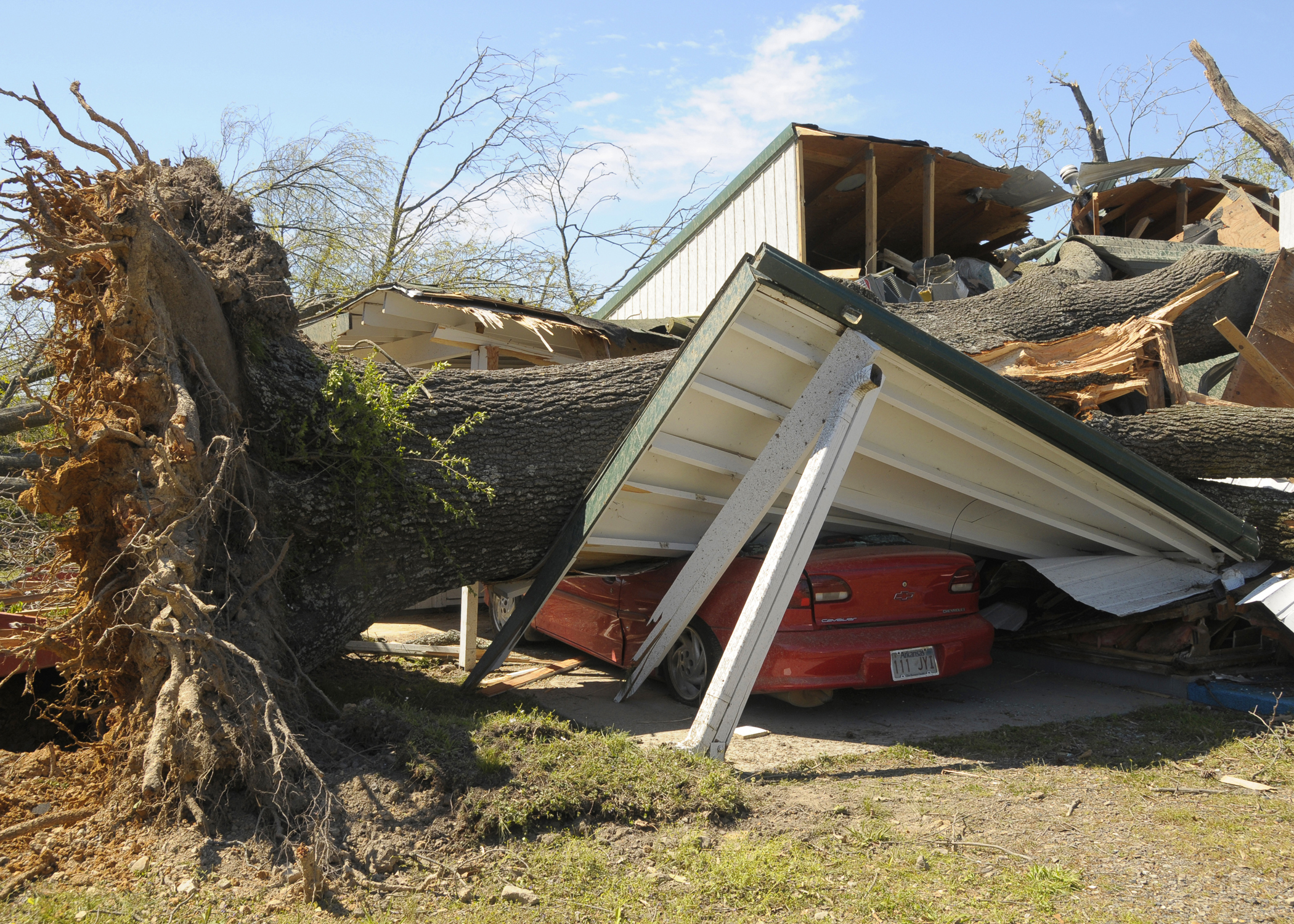
Damaged home in Mena

The Governor of Arkansas Mike Beebe declared five counties in Arkansas disaster areas after the damage caused by the severe weather. Fifty soldiers from the National Guard helped with removing debris and providing security while 60 prisoners also helped with debris removal. The local Walmart was being used as a supply center as it was the only building with power. All Red Cross supplies were sent to the store and arrived on April 10. Two people from the Red Cross assisted victims of the tornado by providing tarps donated by a Lowe's store as well as flashlights and other supplies. Twelve others were sent to conduct damage assessments in Mena. A Southern Baptist Disaster Relief group cooked meals that would be served by the Salvation Army at three different locations. A mobile feeding operation provided meals for residents in De Queen, where a trailer park was destroyed by the inclement weather. On April 14, A group of 19 student-athletes and coaches from the University of Central Arkansas helped unload equipment that was moved from Mena Middle School to a middle school in Hatfield. As many as 300 seventh and eighth-graders were sent to the middle school in Hatfield, while 165 sixth-graders went to a Baptist church to complete the school year.

The Governor of Tennessee Phil Bredesen, United States Senators Bob Corker and Lamar Alexander, United States Representative Bart Gordon and the mayors of Murfreesboro and Rutherford County each toured the tornado damage in Murfreesboro. Sixteen Nashville-area Lowe's stores served as donation sites for the Red Cross to assist people who have been affected by the tornado. Michael Waltrip Racing and Best Western aided victims by donating $7,500 and hotel rooms for those who were left homeless. Country singer Chris Young performed at Middle Tennessee State University for a tornado relief benefit. The Red Cross helped residents in Murfreesboro by serving nearly 15,000 meals and snacks, distributing nearly 4,000 cleanup and comfort kits, and provided counseling to more than 500 tornado victims and their families. The United Way set up the "United Way of Rutherford & Cannon Counties Long Term Recovery Fund" at a bank to accept donations for tornado victims. In South Carolina, Governor Mark Sanford made a visit to Aiken County to assess tornado damage. The Red Cross provided services and disaster relief to those affected in Aiken County such as tarps, food and beverages. A middle school was used as an emergency shelter, and The Salvation Army, Aiken County Emergency Management, Aiken County Sheriff's Office and Department of Social Services helped with the cleanup and removal of debris. In response to the wildfires, the Governor of Oklahoma Brad Henry declared a state of emergency for 31 counties.

== See also ==
- Weather of 2009
- List of North American tornadoes and tornado outbreaks
- List of F4 and EF4 tornadoes
  - List of F4 and EF4 tornadoes (2000–2009)
