= River Junction, Florida =

Unincorporated community in Gadsden County, FL, USA

River Junction is an unincorporated community in Gadsden County, Florida, United States. It became a municipality and raised funds for a sewer system. The arrangement was subject to legal proceedings that reached the Florida Supreme Court in 1936. It ceased to be a town in 1941.

The Apalachicola Northern railroad connected with the Louisville & Nashville railroad at River Junction. Atlantic Coast Line Railroad had a shop there.

The Florida State Road Department produced a map of the area in 1936. Pine resin was brought to the area from Aspalaga Landing by ship and transferred to the rail lines.

The River Junction Tribune was a weekly paper in the area. The great Flood of 1929 affected River Junction and Chattahoochee, Florida. Henry C. Spear was River Junction's postmaster in 1901.

Thomas Anthenlantha Lumpkin owned property in River Junction.

== See also ==
- Chattahoochee, Florida
