= Cross Lake (Shreveport, Louisiana) =

Lake in Caddo Parish, Louisiana, United States

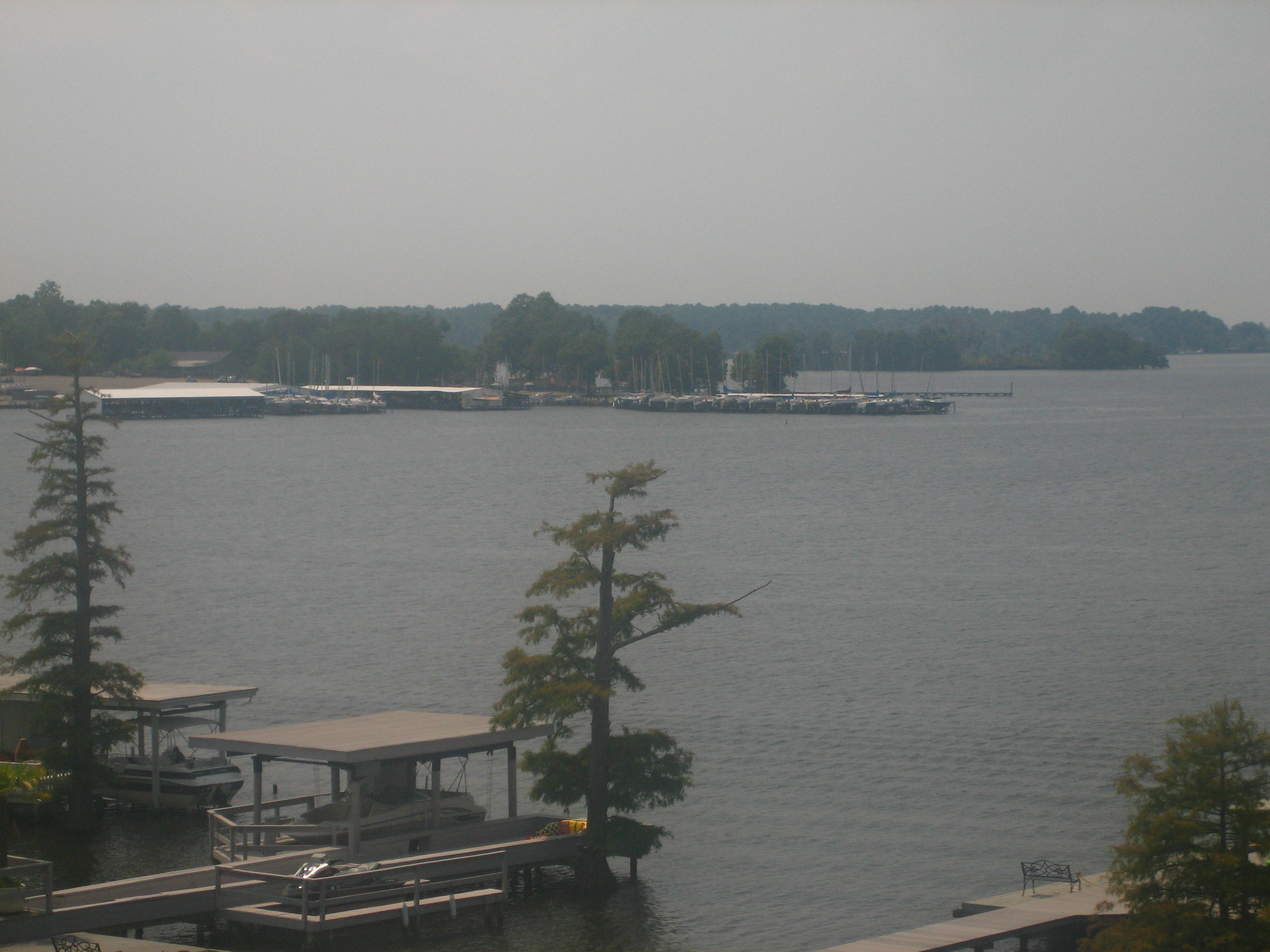

- Location within Louisiana Location within the United States
- Location: Caddo Parish, Louisiana, United States
- Coordinates: 32°30′08″N 93°50′41″W
- Basin countries: United States
- Surface area: 8,575 acres (34.70 km^{2})
- Surface elevation: 171 ft (52 m)

Cross Lake (French: Lac de la Croix) is a man-made 8,575-acre (35 km^{2}) lake located near Shreveport, Louisiana. The reservoir provides the water supply for the City of Shreveport. Moss covered cypress trees line the banks of this open lake popular for fishing and recreational boating. It supports waterfowl, alligators and an abundance of other wildlife. There are many access sites, several commercial facilities, and two public parks.

The Cross Lake land was acquired by the City of Shreveport during the administration of Mayor John H. Eastman, 1910-1914. The reservoir was constructed thereafter under the administration of Mayor Lee Emmett Thomas, 1922-1930. Under Mayor Sam Caldwell, Cross Lake was stocked with fish.

Ford Park, a recreational facility on the lake, is named for the former mayor and finance commissioner John McW. Ford (1880–1965).
