= Kremlin, Oklahoma =

- Town
- Location in Garfield County and the state of Oklahoma.
- Coordinates: 36°32′48″N 97°49′56″W
- Country: United States
- State: Oklahoma
- County: Garfield

Area
  - Total: 0.25 sq mi (0.66 km^{2})
  - Land: 0.25 sq mi (0.66 km^{2})
  - Water: 0 sq mi (0.00 km^{2})
- Elevation: 1,122 ft (342 m)

Population (2020)
  - Total: 247
  - Density: 972/sq mi (375.1/km^{2})
- Time zone: UTC-6 (Central (CST))
  - Summer (DST): UTC-5 (CDT)
- ZIP code: 73753
- Area code: 580
- FIPS code: 40-40400
- GNIS feature ID: 2412847

Kremlin is a town in Garfield County, Oklahoma, United States. As of the 2020 census, Kremlin had a population of 247.

== History ==
The community now known as Kremlin was once called Wild Horse. The Chisholm Trail passed within a quarter mile of the community. The Chicago, Rock Island and Pacific Railroad built a line through the area in 1889. The opening of the Cherokee Outlet for settlement in 1889, led to a flood of settlers. Among them were a group of farmers of German descent from Russia. They brought seeds of winter-hardy Russian wheat that became the major farm crop in this area. The town was renamed in their honor.

== Geography ==
Kremlin is 3 miles (4.8 km) south of the Grant-Garfield county line.

According to the United States Census Bureau, the town has a total area of 0.2 square miles (0.52 km^{2}), all land.

=== Climate ===
Climate data for Kremlin, Oklahoma
Month	Jan	Feb	Mar	Apr	May	Jun	Jul	Aug	Sep	Oct	Nov	Dec	Year
Mean daily maximum °F (°C)	45.4 (7.4)	51.2 (10.7)	61.7 (16.5)	72.3 (22.4)	80.4 (26.9)	89.7 (32.1)	95.2 (35.1)	93.5 (34.2)	84.8 (29.3)	74.3 (23.5)	58.9 (14.9)	47.9 (8.8)	71.3 (21.8)
Mean daily minimum °F (°C)	24.7 (−4.1)	29.0 (−1.7)	37.9 (3.3)	48.7 (9.3)	57.6 (14.2)	66.4 (19.1)	71.3 (21.8)	69.8 (21.0)	62.0 (16.7)	50.4 (10.2)	38.3 (3.5)	27.9 (−2.3)	48.7 (9.3)
Average precipitation inches (mm)	1.0 (25)	1.4 (36)	2.3 (58)	2.9 (74)	4.8 (120)	4.1 (100)	2.8 (71)	3.2 (81)	3.5 (89)	3.1 (79)	2.2 (56)	1.1 (28)	32.4 (820)
Source 1: weather.com
Source 2: Weatherbase.com

== Demographics ==
Historical population
Census	Pop.	Note	%±
1900	221		—
1910	253		14.5%
1920	169		−33.2%
1930	124		−26.6%
1940	146		17.7%
1950	143		−2.1%
1960	128		−10.5%
1970	200		56.3%
1980	301		50.5%
1990	243		−19.3%
2000	240		−1.2%
2010	255		6.3%
2020	247		−3.1%

=== 2020 census ===
As of the 2020 census, Kremlin had a population of 247. The median age was 35.1 years. 28.7% of residents were under the age of 18 and 19.0% of residents were 65 years of age or older. For every 100 females there were 96.0 males, and for every 100 females age 18 and over there were 102.3 males age 18 and over.

0.0% of residents lived in urban areas, while 100.0% lived in rural areas.

There were 93 households in Kremlin, of which 38.7% had children under the age of 18 living in them. Of all households, 54.8% were married-couple households, 19.4% were households with a male householder and no spouse or partner present, and 19.4% were households with a female householder and no spouse or partner present. About 18.3% of all households were made up of individuals and 9.7% had someone living alone who was 65 years of age or older.

There were 112 housing units, of which 17.0% were vacant. The homeowner vacancy rate was 2.5% and the rental vacancy rate was 25.0%.

Racial composition as of the 2020 census
Race	Number	Percent
White	213	86.2%
Black or African American	2	0.8%
American Indian and Alaska Native	2	0.8%
Asian	0	0.0%
Native Hawaiian and Other Pacific Islander	1	0.4%
Some other race	0	0.0%
Two or more races	29	11.7%
Hispanic or Latino (of any race)	5	2.0%

=== 2000 census ===
As of the census of 2000, there were 240 people, 98 households, and 72 families residing in the town. The population density was 949.9 inhabitants per square mile (366.8/km^{2}). There were 112 housing units at an average density of 443.3 per square mile (171.2/km^{2}). The racial makeup of the town was 95.00% White, 1.67% African American, 0.42% Native American, 0.42% Pacific Islander, and 2.50% from two or more races. Hispanic or Latino of any race were 0.42% of the population.

There were 98 households, out of which 28.6% had children under the age of 18 living with them, 62.2% were married couples living together, 7.1% had a female householder with no husband present, and 26.5% were non-families. 25.5% of all households were made up of individuals, and 11.2% had someone living alone who was 65 years of age or older. The average household size was 2.45 and the average family size was 2.96.

In the town, the population was spread out, with 25.0% under the age of 18, 8.8% from 18 to 24, 22.1% from 25 to 44, 28.3% from 45 to 64, and 15.8% who were 65 years of age or older. The median age was 41 years. For every 100 females, there were 108.7 males. For every 100 females age 18 and over, there were 102.2 males.

The median income for a household in the town was $35,417, and the median income for a family was $38,438. Males had a median income of $31,458 versus $22,000 for females. The per capita income for the town was $14,156. About 3.7% of families and 4.2% of the population were below the poverty line, including 5.8% of those under the age of eighteen and 5.1% of those sixty-five or over.

== Education ==
Its school district is Kremlin-Hillsdale Schools.
