= Mecca, Texas =

Mecca
- Unincorporated community
- Interactive map of Mecca
- Location within Texas Mecca (the United States)
- Coordinates: 30°59′3″N 96°4′1″W
- Country: United States
- State: Texas
- County: Madison County

Mecca is an unincorporated community located on Farm Road 978 in Madison County, Texas, United States.

== History ==
Mecca was initially founded in the 1850s and was located in northern Grimes County, until Madison County was approved by the Texas Legislature in 1853, in which it swallowed some portion of northern Grimes County. As a result, Mecca now stands in Madison County.

A communal post office was established in 1894. In 1896, the community had a population of approximately 30. The community also had several amenities such as a general store and a school with 2 teachers and 34 students.

During the early 1900s, the community expanded their amenities, having a drugstore, a barbershop, a millinery shop, a blacksmith shop, cotton gins, and a gristmill. In 1907, the post office closed when it was replaced by mail delivery over a route from Normangee. In 1933, the community's population increased to 50.

By 1935, the school expanded, having 3 teachers and 37 white students. The black students in the district mostly studied in Chapel Hill School. Mecca's only school was then merged into the North Zulch Independent School District.

In 1948, the population remained stagnant at 50, and a business operated there.

By 2000, the community's population slightly decreased to 48.
