= Ford Park (Shreveport, Louisiana) =

Coordinates: 32.4881°N 93.8485°W

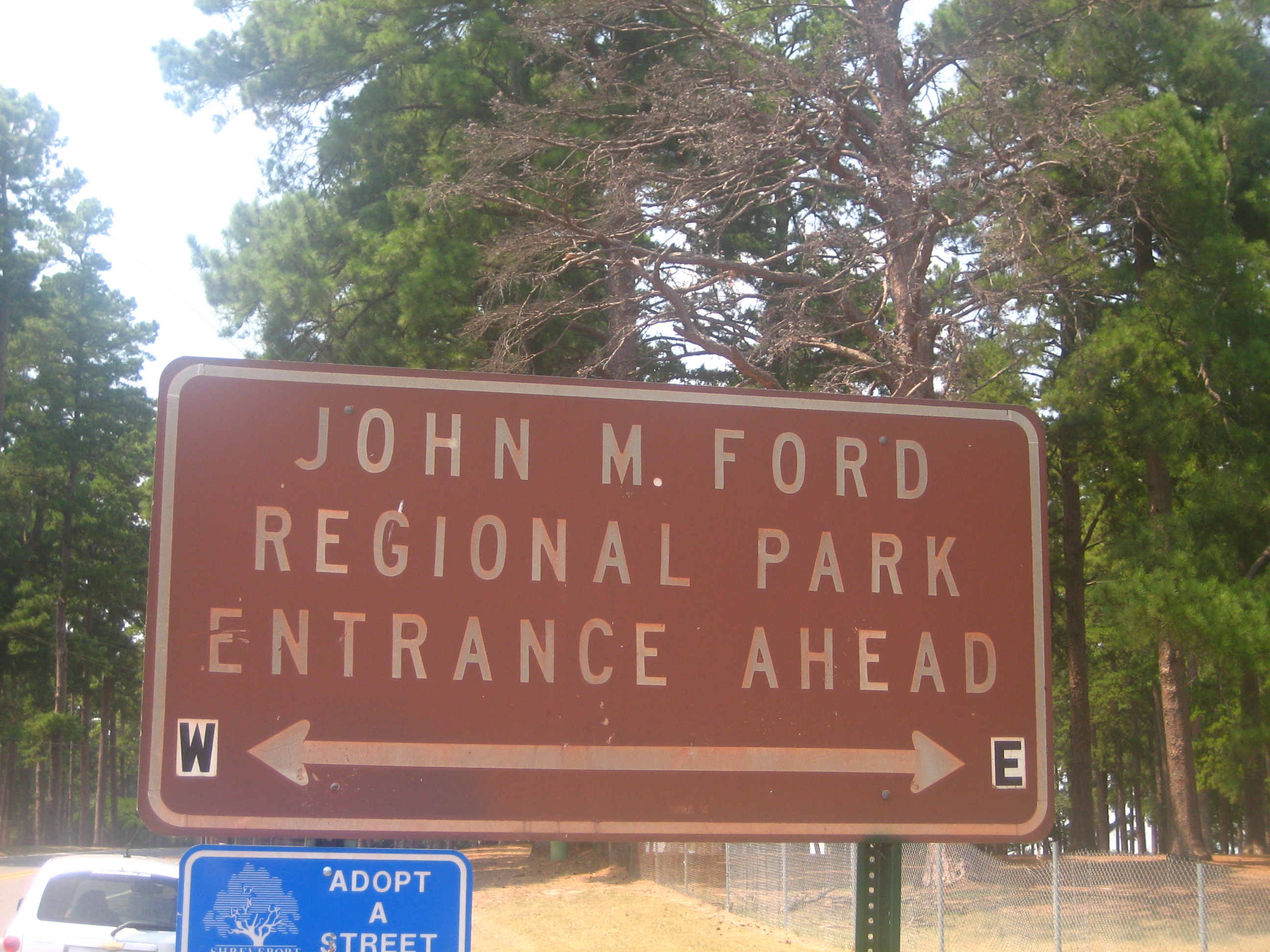
Entrance to Ford Park in Shreveport, Louisiana

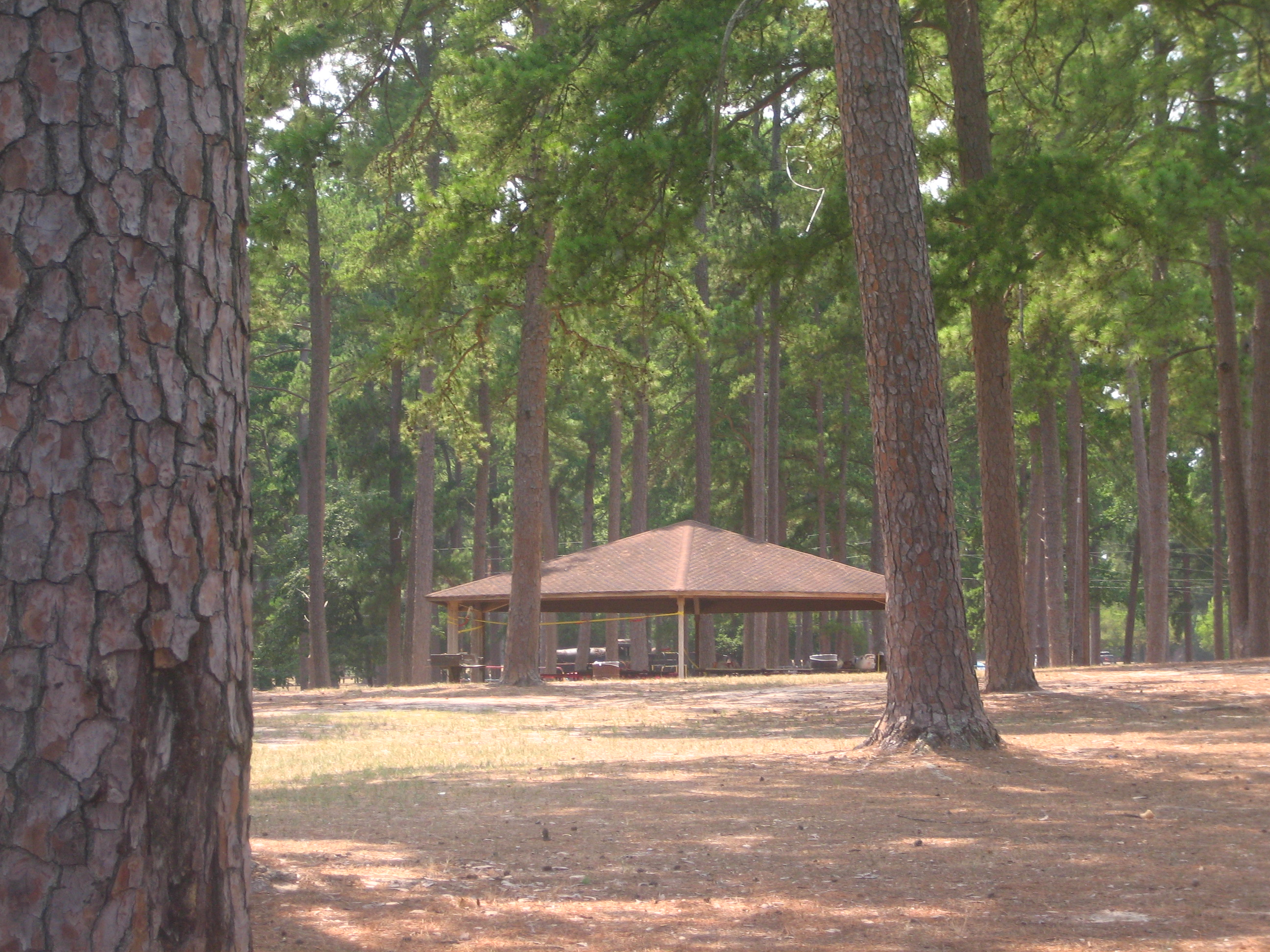
A glimpse of Ford Park

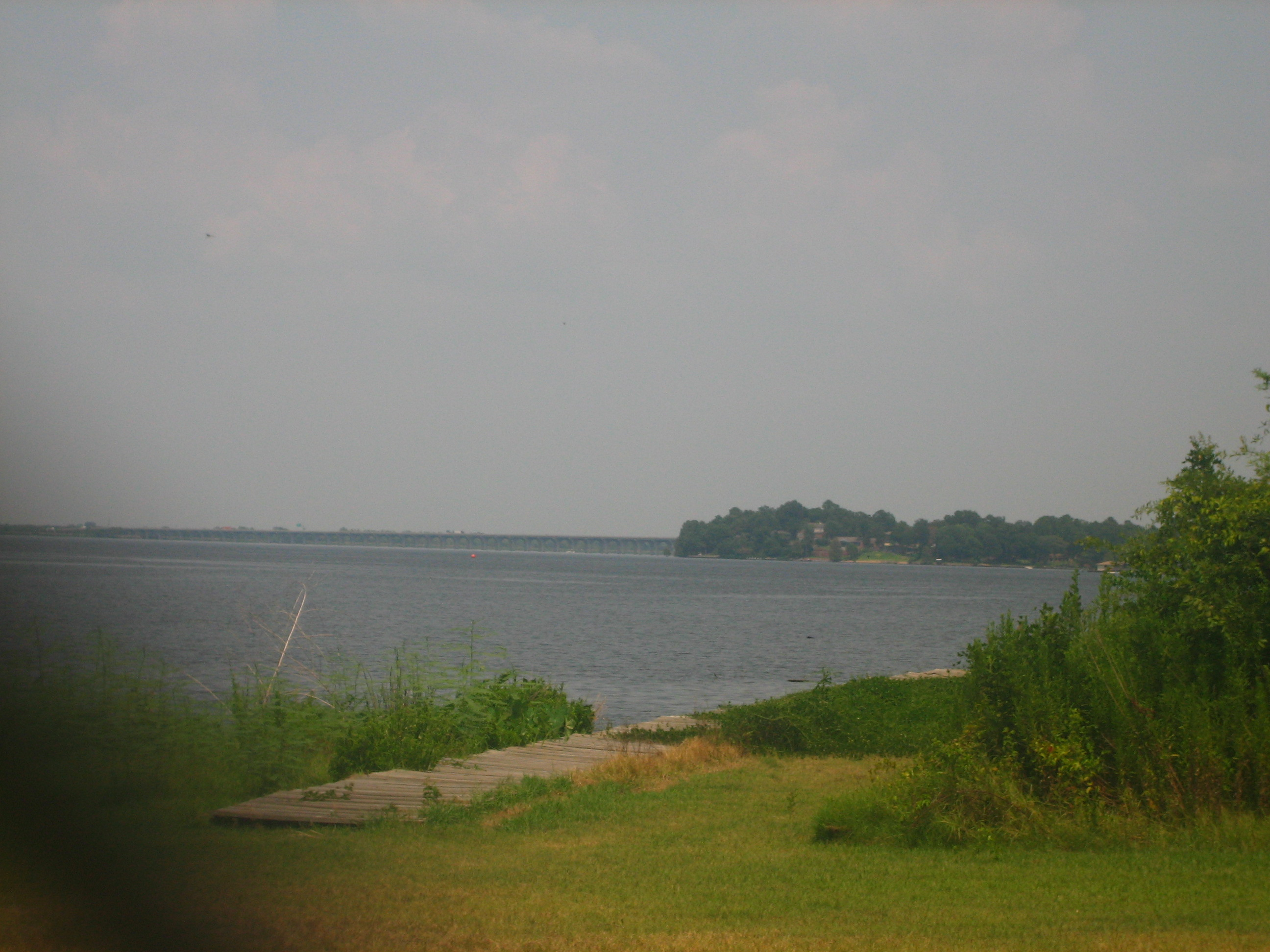
Swimming area on Cross Lake at Ford Park

Ford Park is a facility operated by the City of Shreveport, the seat of Caddo Parish in northwestern Louisiana. The 85-acre (340,000 m^{2}) park is located in north Shreveport at 5784 South Lakeshore Drive near the municipal pier and boat launch.

Lo Walker, the mayor of Bossier City, married his wife, Adele, at Ford Park in 1962.
