= Almo, Kentucky =

Unincorporated community in Kentucky, United States

- Unincorporated community
- Location within the state of Kentucky Almo (the United States)
- Coordinates: 36°41′41″N 88°16′42″W
- Country: United States
- State: Kentucky
- County: Calloway
- Elevation: 430 ft (130 m)
- Time zone: UTC-6 (Central (CST))
  - Summer (DST): UTC-5 (CST)
- ZIP codes: 42020
- Area codes: 270 & 364
- GNIS feature ID: 485892

Almo is an unincorporated community in Calloway County, Kentucky, United States. No one knows when the community was founded, but a rail center was established in the early 1890s by the Nashville, Chattanooga & St. Louis Railway. A post office was opened on February 11, 1891, and given the name Buena, Kentucky. The name of the post office was changed to Almo on November 18, 1892. The new name may have been a shortening of the name Alamo from the Texas Revolution. The post office closed on August 15, 2022.
