= Ink, Arkansas =

- Unincorporated community
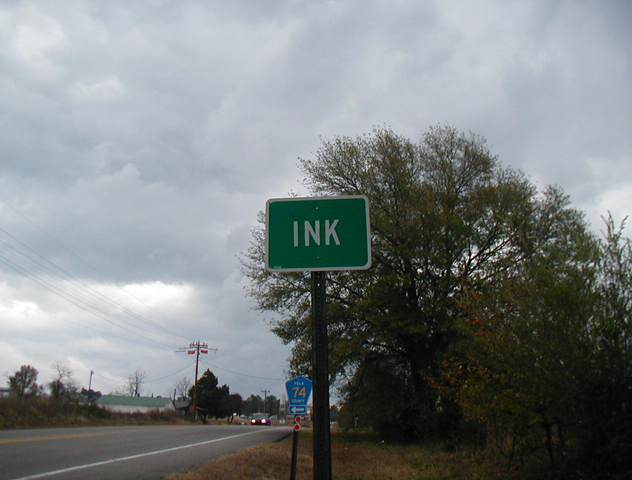
- Road marker for Ink

- Location within Arkansas Location within the United States
- Coordinates: 34°35′14″N 94°07′27″W
- Country: United States
- State: Arkansas
- County: Polk
- Elevation: 1,033 ft (315 m)
- Time zone: UTC-6 (Central (CST))
  - Summer (DST): UTC-5 (CDT)
- Area code: 479
- GNIS feature ID: 72147

Ink is an unincorporated community in Polk County, Arkansas, United States. The elevation of Ink is 1,033 feet.

A popular and apocryphal story of how the town got its name in 1887 is one based on a misunderstanding. When the townsfolk were completing the government application to establish a post office, they interpreted the instruction "Please write in ink" literally and entered the name "Ink" as the proposed town name. This was accepted as the official name.

The true story is that many towns were trying to register at the same time, and the United States Postal Service was trying very hard to limit the number of duplicate place names. Postmasters of the various post offices trying to register their towns were required to give several name alternatives. Most towns did not get their first, second, or even third choices. Ink was actually the second choice, the first being "Melon."
